= Maine (province) =

Coordinates: 48.00°N 0.20°E

- Flag Coat of arms

- Country: France
- Time zone: CET

Maine (French: [mɛːn]) is one of the traditional provinces of France. It corresponds to the former County of Maine, whose capital was also the city of Le Mans. The area, now divided into the departments of Sarthe and Mayenne, has about 857,000 inhabitants.

== History ==
=== Antiquity ===
The Gallic tribe Aulerci Cenomani lived in the region during the Iron Age and Roman period. The province of Maine was named after them, in the 6th century AD as in Cinomanico (in pago Celmanico in 765, *Cemaine, then Le Maine from the 12th century).

=== Early Middle Ages ===
In the 8th and 9th centuries, there existed a Duchy of Cénomannie (ducatus Cenomannicus), which several of the Carolingian kings used as an appanage. This duchy was a march that may have included several counties including Maine, and extended into Lower Normandy, all the way to the Seine. In 748, Pepin the Short, then Mayor of the Palace and thus the most powerful man in Francia after the king, gave this duchy to his half-brother Grifo. In 790 Charlemagne in turn gave it to his younger son, Charles the Younger. Charlemagne's grandson, the future Charles the Bald, and his son Louis the Stammerer inherited the title. The son-in-law of Charlemagne, Rorgon, was the count of Maine between 832 and 839. In the last half of the 9th century, Maine took on strategic importance because of invasions from Normandy and Brittany. Rorgon's son Gauzfrid in turn became Count of Maine. He fought against Salomon, King of Brittany and in 866 participated in the battle of Brissarthe alongside Robert the Strong, the Frankish Margrave of Neustria. When Gauzfrid died, Charles the Bald granted the title, as well as the county and the wider Neustrian march to Ragenold of Neustria, because Gauzfrid's children were too young to act in that capacity. Ragenold, who may have been the son of Renaud d'Herbauges, died in 885 fighting the Vikings who were pillaging Rouen.

King Rudolph of France is said to have given Maine to the Norse nobleman Rollo, Duke of Normandy, in 924.

Map of Maine

=== High Middle Ages ===
==== Angevin period (c. 1000–1063) ====
Bordering the county of Anjou to the south and the Duchy of Normandy to the north, Maine became a bone of contention between the rulers of these more powerful principalities. Hugh III of Maine (ruled c. 991–c. 1015) was forced to recognize Fulk III, Count of Anjou as his overlord.

Sometime between 1045 and 1047 Hugh IV married Bertha, daughter of Odo II, Count of Blois and widow of Alan III, Duke of Brittany. The Angevins did not want Maine to come under the influence of Blois, and Count Geoffrey Martel invaded Maine. But the Normans did not want Maine to return to the Angevin orbit, so were pulled into the conflict. The precise chronology is disputed, but it is clear that in 1051 Hugh IV died and the citizens of Le Mans opened their gate to the Angevins. Anjou wound up with effective control of most of the county, but the Normans did take several important strongholds on the Maine–Normandy border.

==== Norman Conquest and rule (1062–1070) ====
Hugh IV's son Herbert II fled to the Norman court (though some historians say he was under Angevin control for a few years first) and his death in 1062 precipitated a succession crisis. Herbert died childless in 1062 after declaring William the Bastard, then Duke of Normandy, his heir. His sister Marguerite was engaged to William's eldest son, Robert Curthose and Herbert had taken refuge at William's court in 1056 when Geoffrey Martel, Duke of Anjou, invaded Le Mans.

While the county was in Angevin hands, Anjou had its own succession problem. Duke William of Normandy claimed the county on their behalf of Herbert's young sister Margaret, betrothed to his son Robert Curthose. The other claimant was Herbert's aunt Biota, a sister of Hugh IV, and her husband Walter, Count of the Vexin. William invaded Maine in force in 1063 and despite stiff opposition from Fulk IV, Count of Anjou and from local barons such as Geoffrey of Mayenne and Hubert de Sainte-Suzanne, he controlled the county by the beginning of 1064. Biota and Walter were captured at the taking of Le Mans. They died sometime later in 1063, poisoned, it was rumoured, though there is no hard evidence for this. Norman control of Maine secured the southern border of Normandy against Anjou and is one factor which enabled William to launch his successful invasion of England in 1066.

In 1069 the citizens of Le Mans revolted against the Normans. Soon some of the Manceaux barons joined the revolt, the Normans were expelled in 1070, and young Hugh V was proclaimed Count of Maine.

==== Independent period (1070–1129) ====
Hugh was the son of Azzo d'Este and his wife Gersendis, the other sister of Count Hugh IV. Azzo returned to Italy, leaving Gersendis in charge. The real power, however, was one of the Manceaux barons, Geoffrey of Mayenne, who may also have been Gersendis' lover. After Norman attacks in 1073, 1088, 1098 and 1099, Elias I succeeded his cousin Hugh V, who sold Maine to him in 1092 for ten thousand shillings. His daughter married Fulk V, Count of Anjou, who took Maine over in 1110 after the death of Elias. Henri Beauclerc, agreed to recognize him as Count of Maine so long as he acknowledged the Duke of Normandy as his overlord.

==== Plantagenet period (1129–1204) ====
Fulk's son Geoffrey Plantagenet, Count of Anjou inherited Maine. When Geoffrey died in 1151, it passed to his son, King Henry II of England. Since Henry had been Duke of Normandy since 1150, Anjou, Maine, and Normandy all had the same ruler for the first time. Henry later founded the Plantagenet dynasty in England.

When Richard the Lionheart, ruler of England, Normandy, Aquitaine, Anjou, Brittany, Maine and Touraine, collectively known as the Angevin Empire, died in 1199, it sparked a war of succession that lasted until 1204. While John Lackland managed to become recognised as King of England, the Plantagenet holdings of Normandy, Touraine, Anjou and Maine were invaded and conquered by King Philip II of France. During the invasion, the French seneschal William des Roches took Touraine, Anjou and Maine on behalf of the French king.

=== Late Middle Ages ===
In 1331 the Count of Maine became a peer of the realm.

After the Battle of Verneuil in 1424, the English occupied Maine, and John of Lancaster took the title of Duke. The English held Le Mans until 1448 and Fresnay until 1449. In 1481, Charles IV, Duke of Anjou bequeathed his lands to Louis XI of France, thus returning the county to the crown.

=== French Revolution ===
Since 1791, Maine forms the biggest part of two departments : Mayenne and Sarthe

At the beginning, a part of the Maine population supported the French Revolution that took place in Paris. The extension of it and the general opposition of the other European countries provoked a war, that forced the authorities of the new founded French Republic to engage soldiers to fight against its European enemies. The growing need of soldiers had bad consequences in the Maine, the south of Normandy and the eastern part of Brittany: Young men refused to join the army and preferred to disappear and hide themselves. They organized a sort of secret army and they got the name of Chouans, from the nickname of their chief, Jean Cottereau. With such chiefs, Maine became quickly the centre of Chouan counter-revolution. They found local support everywhere among the peasants, who were shocked by the way the administration and the army treated the priests and the Roman Catholic religion.

=== Modern times ===
During the French Revolution Maine became part of the new created départements Mayenne and Sarthe, now they are incorporated together in the Pays de la Loire Region.

== Gallery ==
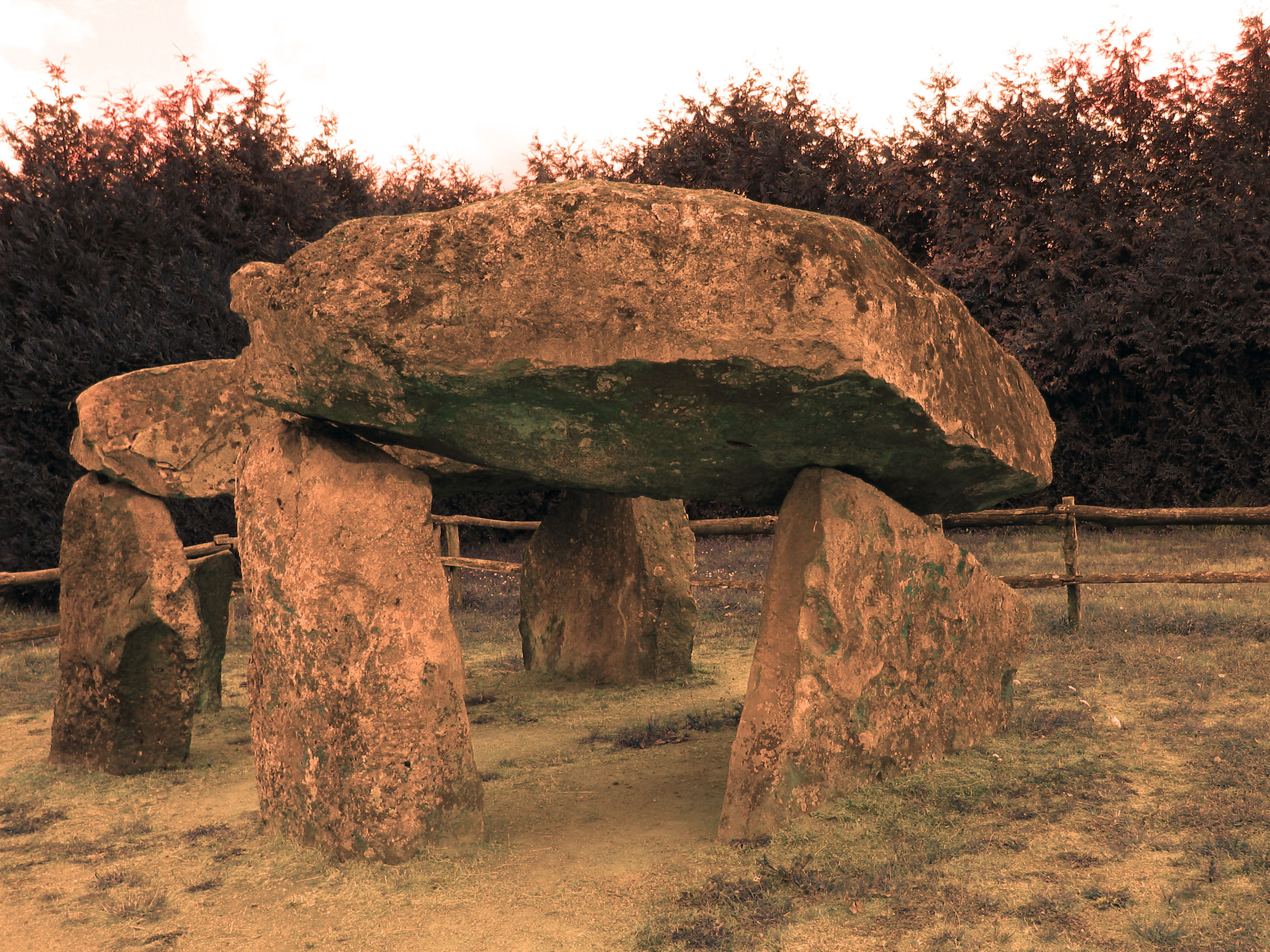
Des Erves dolmen 4000 BC

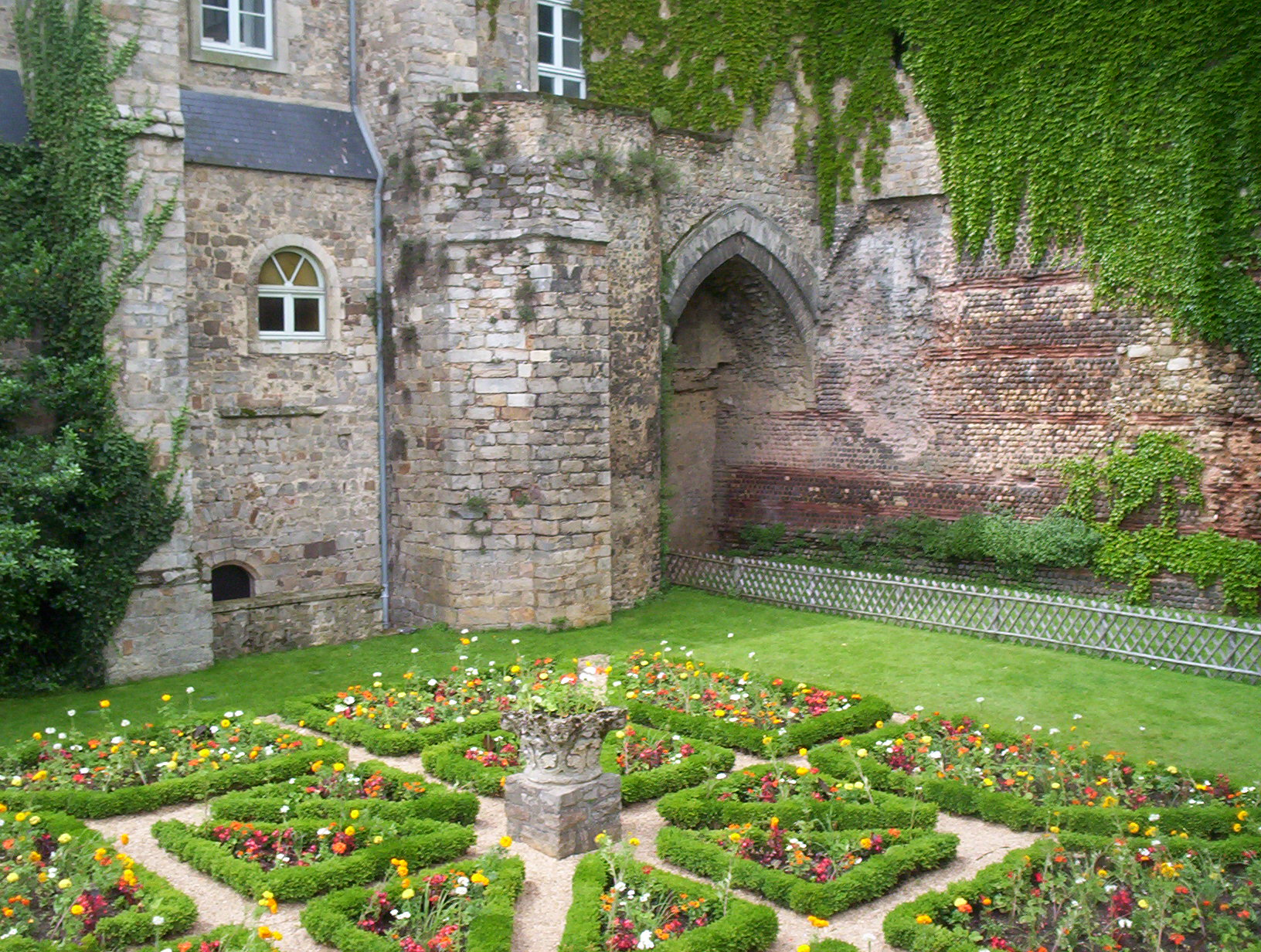
Gallo-Roman and medieval city wall in Le Mans

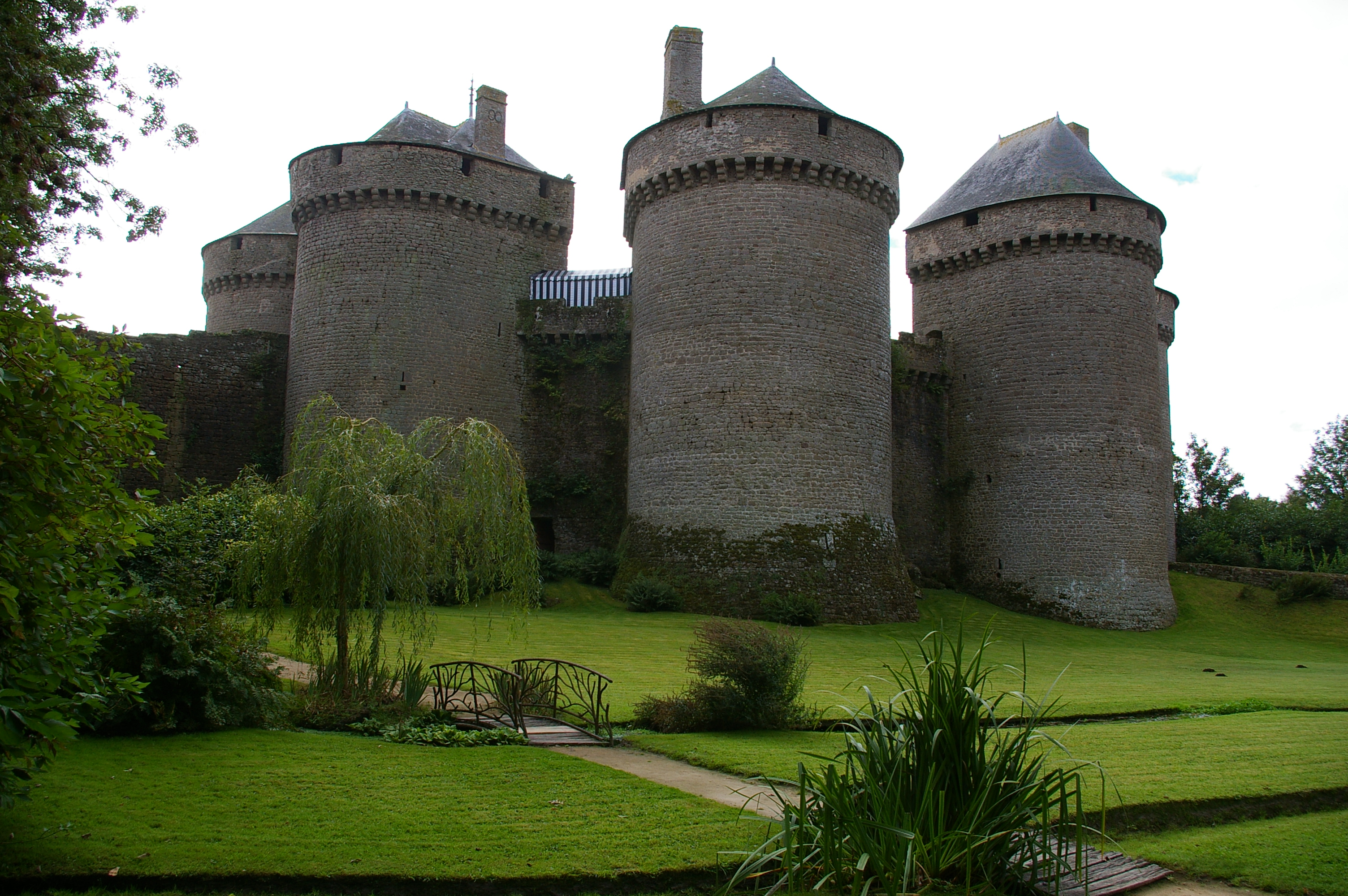
Lassay Castle 12th → 15th century

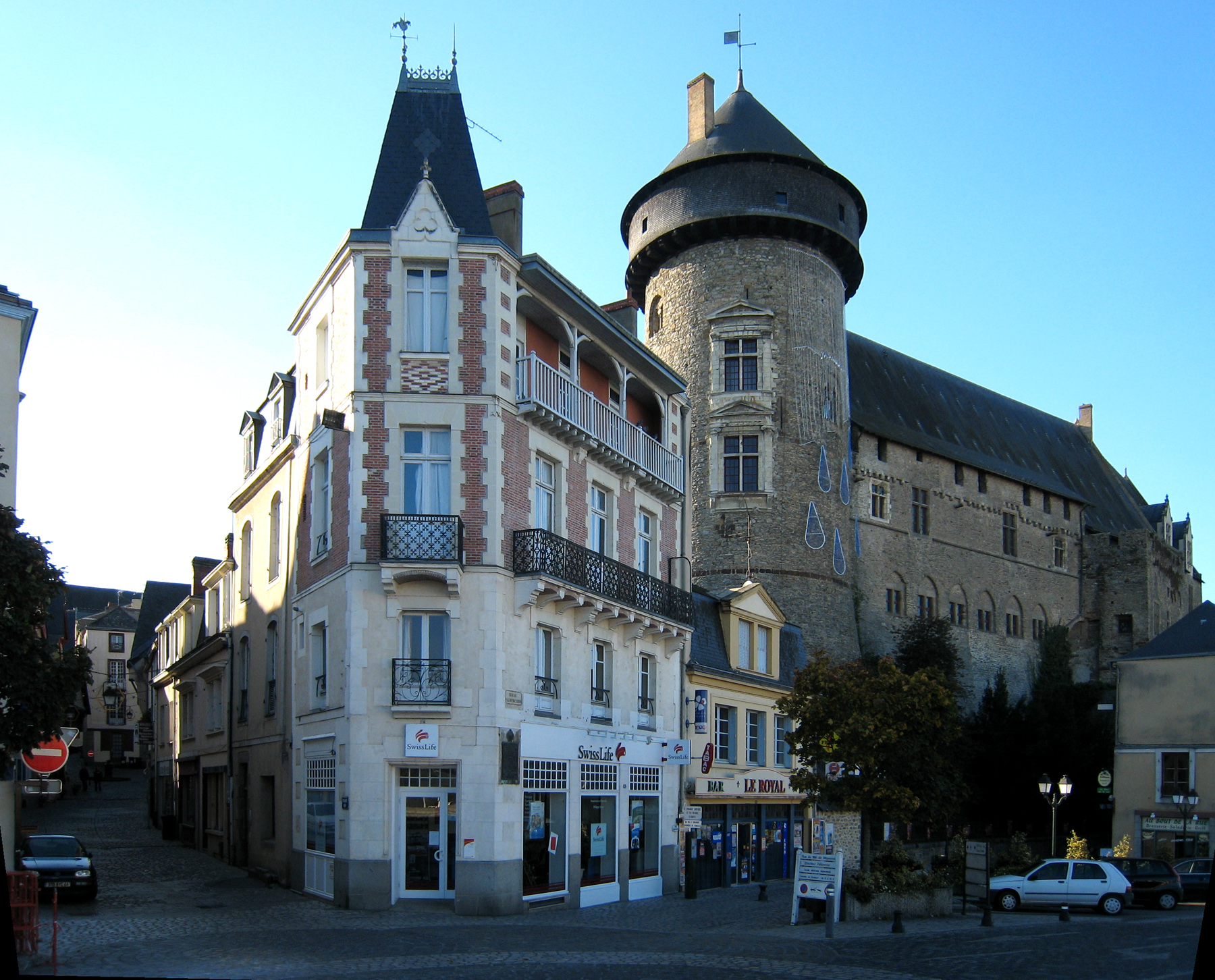
Laval Castle and Town

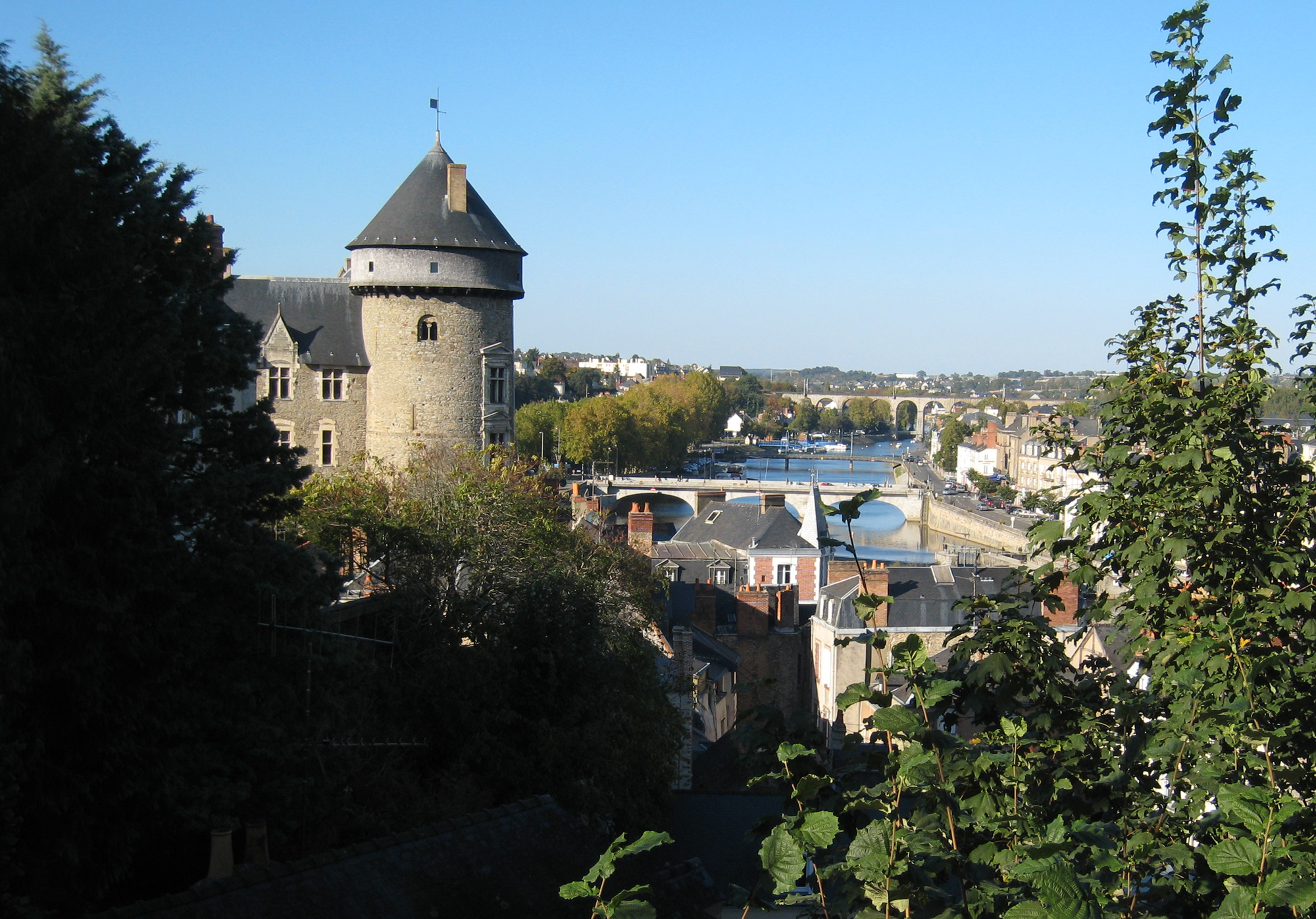
View of Laval

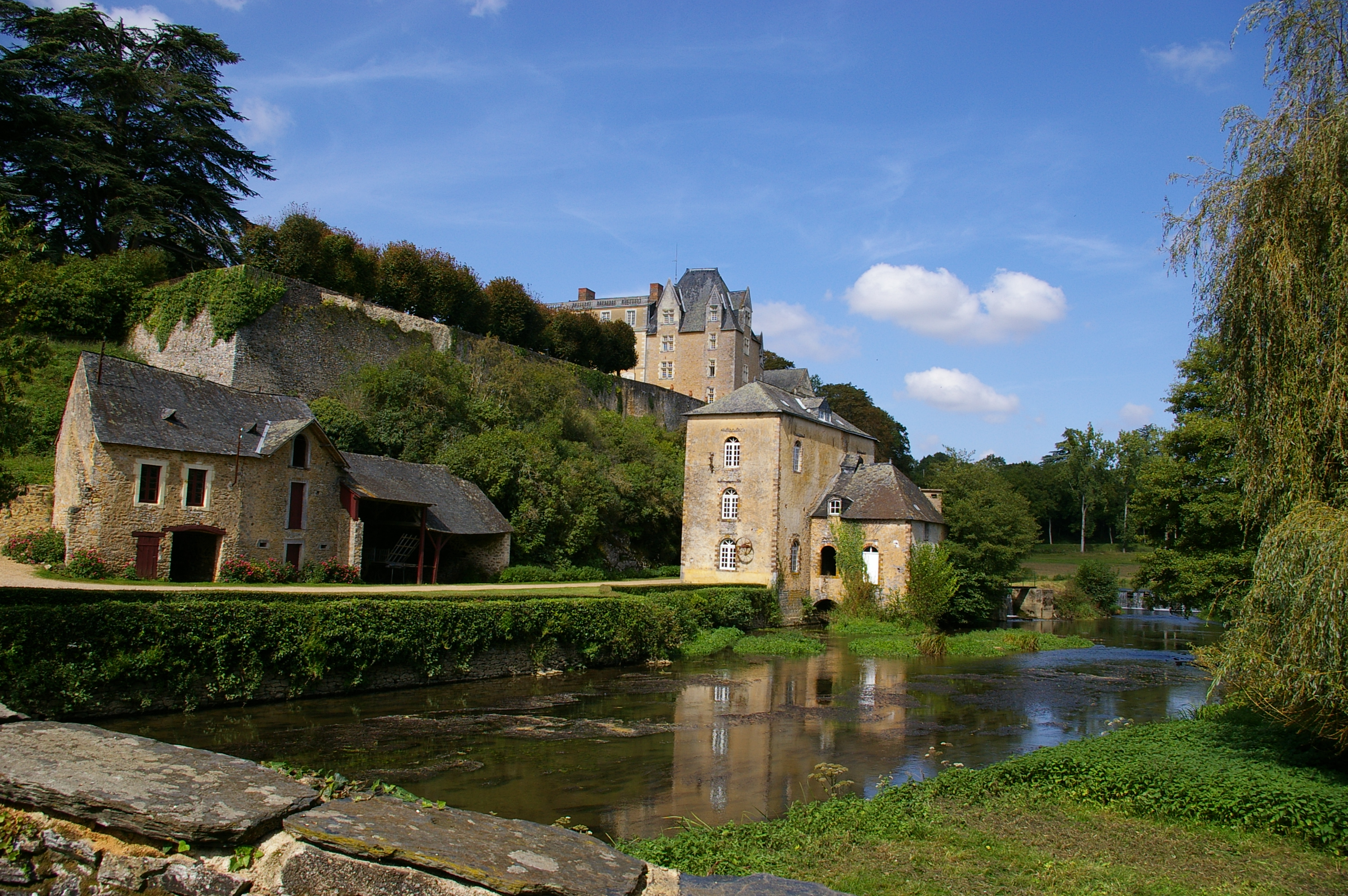
Thévalles Castle

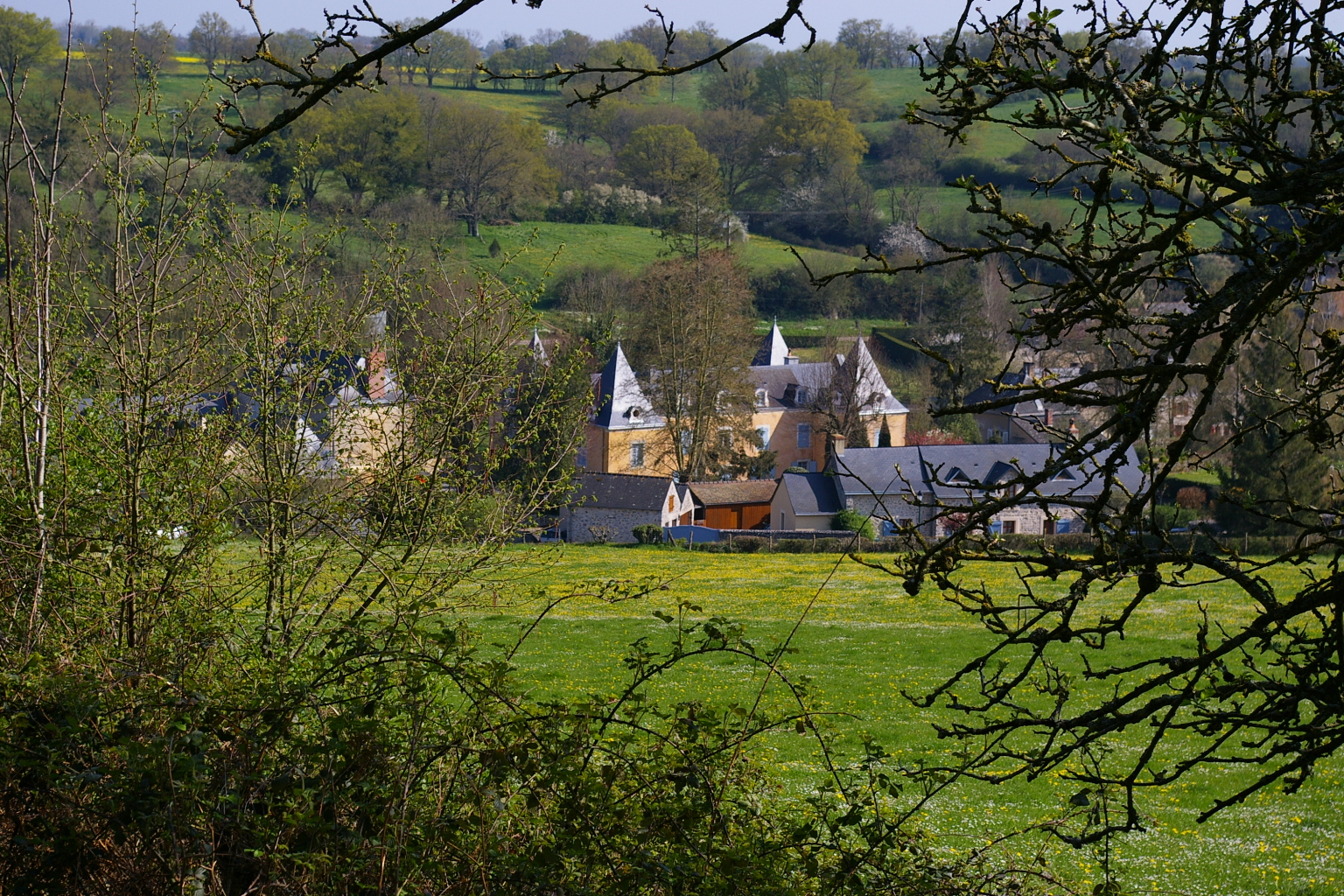
Maine Bocage-Hedgerows

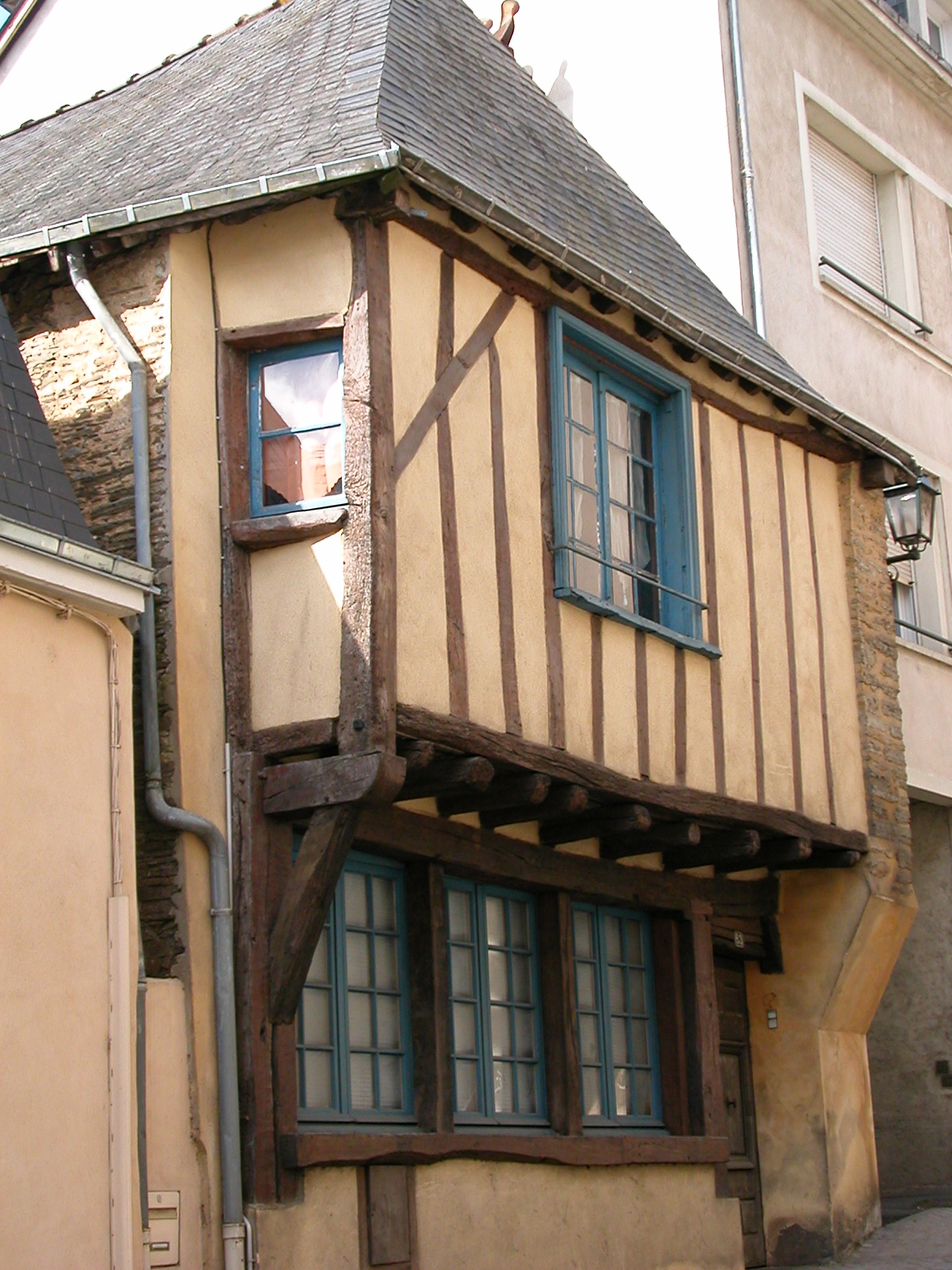
Medieval half-timbered house in Château-Gontier

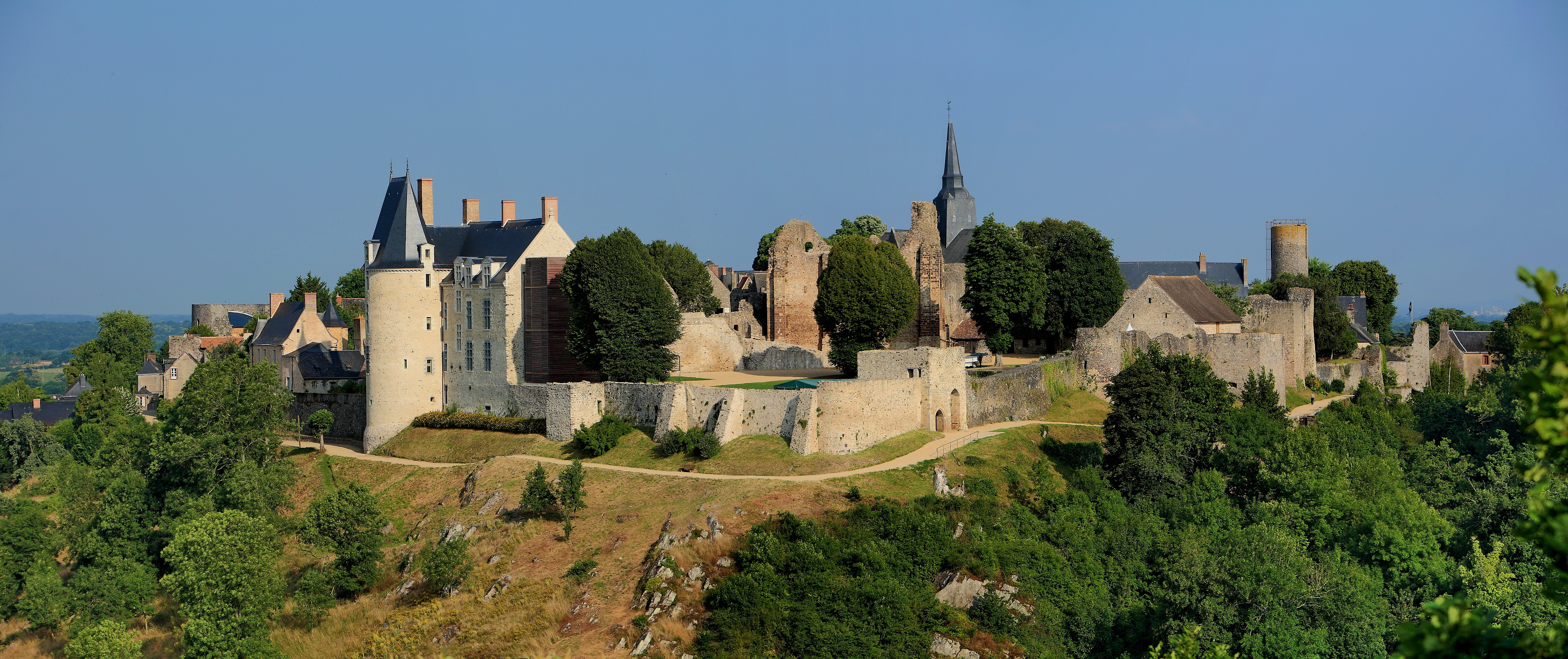
Panoramic view of Sainte-Suzanne, Mayenne

== See also ==
- Counts and Dukes of Maine

== Bibliography ==
- Patrice Morel, "Les Comtes du Maine au IX siècle", in Revue Historique et Archéologique du Maine, Le Mans, 2005, 4° série T.5, tome CLVI de la Collection, pp. 177–264 (avec Index des principaux personages; Bibliographie).
- Robert Latouche, "Les premiers comtes héréditaires du Maine", in Revue Historique et Archéologique du Maine, Le Mans, 1959, tome CXV de la Collection, pp. 37–41
- Robert Latouche, Histoire du Comté du Maine pendant le X° et XI° siècles, Bibliothèque de l'École des Hautes Études, Paris, 1910.
- Gérard Louise, "La seigneurie de Bellême Xe-XIIe siècles", dans Le Pays bas-normand, 1990, no 3 (199), pp. 161–175
- Jean-Pierre Brunterc'h, " le duché du Maine et la marche de Bretagne " dans La Neustrie. Les Pays au nord de la Loire de 650 à 850, colloque historique international publié par Hartmut Atsma, 1989, tome 1.
- François Neveux, la Normandie des ducs aux rois Xe-XIIe siècle, Rennes, Ouest-France, 1998
- Auguste Bry, Le Maine et l'Anjou, historiques, archéologiques et pittoresques. Recueil des sites et des monuments les plus remarquables sous le rapport de l'art et de l'histoire des départements de la Sarthe, de la Mayenne et de Maine-et-Loire, Nantes et Paris, 1856–1860;
- Abbé Angot, "Les vicomtes du Maine", dans Bulletin de la Commission historique et archéologique de la Mayenne, 1914, no 30, pp. 180–232, 320–342, 404–424.
