= Gauzlin =

Gauzlin (also Gozlin or Goslin) may refer to:

- Gauzlin I of Maine (died c. 820), count, founder of the Rorgonids
- Gauzlin of Paris (died 886), archchancellor, bishop of Paris
- Gauzlin II of Maine (died 914), count of Maine
- Gauzlin of Langres (died 931), bishop of Langres
- Gauzelin of Toul (died 962), bishop and saint
- Gauzlin of Fleury (died 1030), archbishop of Bourges

== See also ==
- Jocelyn
