= Gauzlin I of Maine =

9th-century Frankish noble

Gauzlin I of Maine was a lord of Maine in the beginning of the 9th century. He was the oldest known ancestor of the Rorgonid family. On onomastic considerations, he could be a descendant of the 8th-century Duke of Maine, Charivius.

He is named in a document as being in the Spanish March on 2 April 812 with Charlemagne at a meeting of the Counts.

He is also known from a charter on 1 March 839 signed by his son Rorgon sent to the Abbey of Saint-Maur de Glanfeuil. In it, Rorgon names his family there: "My father Gauzlin and my mother Adeltrudis, and my brother Gauzbert."

He married Adeltrude of Bourges, daughter of the Count of Bourges. Their children were:

- Rorgon I, Count of Maine (d. 839)
- Gauzbert, Count of Maine (d. 853)
