= Jocelyn =

- Pronunciation: /ˈdʒɒslɪn/ French: [ʒɔslɛ̃]
- Gender: Unisex
- Language: English, French

Jocelyn is a given name and surname; as a given name it is a unisex (male/female) name. Variants include Jocelin, Joceline, Jocelyne, Jocelynn, Jocelynne, Joscelin, Josceline, Joscelyn, Joscelynn, Joscelynne, Joseline, Joselyn, Joselyne, Joslin, Joslyn, Josselin, Joslynn, Josselyn, Josilyn, Josslyn, Joycelyn, and Juscelino.

The name may derive from Josselin, a locality in Brittany, France, and have been introduced to England after the Norman Conquest. It derives from the Germanic name Gauzlin.

In French, the spelling "Jocelyn" is exclusively male. The female counterpart is spelled "Jocelyne".

== Given name ==
=== Goscelin ===
- Goscelin, 11th-century hagiographer, also known as Jocelyn

=== Jocelyn ===
- Joss Ackland, British actor whose birth name is Sidney Edmond Jocelyn Ackland
- Jocelyn Angloma, French-Guadeloupean football player
- Jocelyn Barrow, British educator, community activist and politician
- Jocelyn Bell Burnell, British astronomer
- Jocelyn Benson, American politician and attorney
- Jocelyn Bioh, Ghanaian-American writer and actor
- Jocelyn Bolante, Filipino politician
- Jocelyn Brooke, British author
- Jocelyn Brown, American singer
- Jocelyn Burdick, American politician
- Jocelyn de Brakelond, 12th-century chronicler
- Jocelyn Chia, American comedian
- Jocelyn Chng, Singaporean businesswoman
- Jocelyn Desjardins (born 1970), Quebec journalist and politician
- Jocelyn Enriquez, American singer
- Jocelyn Erickson, American softball player
- Jocelyn Gill, American astronomer
- Jocelyn Godefroi, British translator
- Jocelyn Hattab, French-Tunisian television presenter
- Jocelyn Jee Esien, British comedian
- Jocelyn Lovell, Canadian cyclist
- Jocelyn Mitnaul Mallette, American lawyer and politician
- Jocelyn McCallum, Australian softball player
- Jocelyn Moorhouse, Australian film director
- Jocelyn Nuttall, New Zealand professor of education
- Jocelyn Pook, English violist
- Jocelyn Thibault, Canadian hockey player
- Jocelyn Wildenstein, Swiss-American socialite known for having a cat-like appearance due to extensive cosmetic surgery

=== Joscelin ===
- Joscelin, Bishop of Paris, 9th-century French cleric
- Joscelin I of Edessa (died 1131), Crusader lord
- Joscelin II of Edessa (died 1159), Crusader lord
- Joscelin III of Edessa (1159 – after 1190), Crusader lord
- Joscelin of Louvain, Brabantian/English nobleman

=== Josceline ===
- Josceline de Bohon, bishop of Salisbury
- Josceline Dimbleby, British cookery writer
- Josceline Percy, officer in the British Royal Navy
- Josceline Percy, English politician
- Josceline Percy, 11th Earl of Northumberland, English nobleman

=== Joscelyn ===
- Joscelyn Godwin, British composer, musicologist, and translator
- Joscelyn Roberson, American artistic gymnast
- Joss Stone, British singer whose birth name is Joscelyn Eve Stoker

=== Jocelin ===
- Jocelin (d. 1199), abbot of Melrose, and bishop of Glasgow
- Jocelin de Dijon (fl. 1200–25), trouvère
- Jocelin of Soissons (d. 1152)
- Jocelin of Wells, 13th-century bishop of Bath and Wells

=== Jocelyne ===
- Jocelyne Betty Okagua Apiafi, Nigerian politician
- Jocelyne Lanois, French-Canadian singer
- Jocelyne Villeton, French long-distance runner

=== Jocelynne ===
- Jocelynne Rainey, American nonprofit leader
- Jocelynne Scutt, Australian lawyer, writer and commentator

=== Joycelyn ===
- Joycelyn Elders, American public health administrator

=== Joselyn ===
- Joselyn Cano, American model
- Joselyn Dumas, Ghanaian television host
- Joselyn Alejandra Niño, Mexican criminal

=== Joseline ===
- Joseline Hernandez, Puerto Rican reality television personality, rapper and actress

=== Juscelino ===
- Juscelino Filho, Brazilian federal deputy and cabinet minister
- Juscelino Kubitschek, Brazilian president

== Surname ==
- Jocelyn (surname)
- John Joscelyn, English antiquarian
- Ralph Josselyn, Lord Mayor of London
- Ralph Josselin, English priest
- For the Jocelyns of Hyde Hall near Sawbridgeworth, see the Earl of Roden.

== See also ==
- Gauzlin
- Joslin
