= Eremburga of Maine =

Countess of Maine and Anjou

Eremburga (French: Erembourg; died 1126) was, in her own right, the countess of Maine and lady of Château-du-Loir from 1110 to 1126 as well as the countess of Anjou by marriage.

Eremburga was born in the early to mid-1090s. She was the sole daughter and heir of Count Elias I of Maine and Matilda, daughter and heir of Gervais II of Château-du-Loir. Before the end of the First Crusade (1096–1099), Eremburga was betrothed to Geoffrey IV, son and heir apparent of Count Fulk IV of Anjou. After Eremburga's mother died in late March 1099, Elias considered Geoffrey to be his heir in right of Eremburga. Geoffrey was killed in May 1106 while dealing with a rebellion. By 29 July 1108, Eremburga had married Fulk V, half-brother of Geoffrey and new heir apparent to the County of Anjou. Fulk IV died on 14 April 1109, leaving Anjou to Eremburga's husband. Although Elias remarried that year, he had no further children and Eremburga's claim to Maine remained uncontested. When he died on 11 July 1110, Fulk became count of Maine in her right.

Eremburga and Fulk had four children: Geoffrey, Elias, Matilda, and Sibylla. They were probably born by 1114, when Eremburga became a prominent figure in the comital government. She routinely acted together with Fulk and also adjudicated alone. Official narratives presented the couple's relationship as one of love and affection, using this image to emphasize Eremburga's central role in reinforcing Fulk's authority through active engagement in local politics. When Fulk left France to join a crusade, Eremburga ruled their counties alone–something none of the previous countesses of Anjou had done. Whereas her predecessors had involved themselves primarily with their own ancestral lands, dowry or dower territories and patronages, Eremburga acted as a partner in her husband's rule. The countess was an avid supporter of the Cistercians; in 1121, she and Fulk founded the Cistercian Abbey of Notre-Dame of Le Louroux.

Eremburga fell ill in late 1126. Fulk summoned his friend and personal physician, Abbot John of Saint-Nicholas, to attend her at the comital castle of Baugé. She died in late December 1126 (or possibly early January 1127). Fulk issued a grant to the Fontevraud Abbey fulfilling her last request. Eremburga was buried at Louroux.
