= Gauzlin II of Maine =

French noble (d. 914)

Gauzlin II (died 914) was Count of Maine from 893 to 895. He was from the Rorgonid family, the son of Gauzfrid, Count of Maine and Margrave of Neustria.

Upon his father's death in 878, he was too young to inherit his father's responsibilities, and it was a cousin, Ragenold, who became Margrave of Neustria and Count of Maine.

When Ragenold was killed by Viking raiders in 885, Henry was appointed as Margrave of Neustria and Roger became Count of Maine.

Gauzlin allied himself with the Robertians, and when Odo became King of France, he deposed Roger in 893 and appointed Gauzlin as Count of Maine. However, Gauzlin could not hold on to Maine and Roger regained control of Maine in 895.

Gauzlin continued the fight against Roger, and then against his son Hugh I. They eventually made peace and it is probable that Hugh married a daughter of Gauzlin during the peace. He died in 914.
