= Herbert I of Maine =

French noble

Herbert I, Count of Maine
- Died: 13 April 1035
- Noble family: Hugonide
- Issue Detail: Hugh IV, Count of Maine
- Father: Hugh III of Maine

Herbert I (died 13 April 1035), called Wakedog (from French Eveille-chien, Latinized as Evigilans Canis), was the count of Maine from 1017 until his death. He had a turbulent career with an early victory that may have contributed to his later decline.

== Life ==
He was the son of Hugh III and succeeded his father as count of Maine. (Note: Although Herbert was called count as early as 1016, his father was probably still alive in 1017. There is evidence to believe Herbert was probably involved in the administration of the county during his father's later years) Herbert was, at times, a nominal vassal of his neighbor Fulk III Nerra, Count of Anjou but otherwise considered himself independent and obtained his nickname "Wake-dog" for having to constantly resist the intrusions of his Angevin neighbors to the south. From the time Herbert became count in 1017, he was almost constantly at war with Avesgaud de Bellême, Bishop of Le Mans.

In 1016, a young Herbert was allied to Fulk III in a war against Odo II of Blois. On 6 July, Odo was en route to attack the fortress of Montrichard. Upon discovering this, Fulk and Herbert split their forces to block either of the two approaches. Odo ran headlong into the Angevin force under Fulk, known as the Battle of Pontlevoy. Odo’s greater force was prevailing and Fulk himself was thrown from his horse and in danger of being killed or captured, but a messenger had been sent to Herbert to come immediately.

Herbert attacked the left flank of Odo’s forces throwing them into complete confusion; Odo’s mounted force fled leaving his foot soldiers to be slaughtered. Odo was defeated and was unable to challenge Fulk again for nearly a decade. While this battle established Herbert’s reputation as a warrior it also began deteriorating the relationship between Fulk and Herbert.

Map of the County of Maine

His battles with Avesgaud, Bishop of Le Mans, were heating up again and, in 1025, Herbert made a night raid on the Bishop’s castle at Duneau causing Avesgaud to flee to the protection of his brother William Lord of Belleme. Once he was safe, the Bishop excommunicated Herbert and then continued his warring against him. Not long after the excommunication was lifted and peace was restored between them, Herbert started raiding the Bishop's estates again. This time, Herbert, with the help of Count Alan III of Rennes, attacked the Bishop at his castle at Le Ferte and reduced this castle as well.

On 7 March 1025, Fulk Nerra lured Herbert to Saintes on the promise of giving him Saintes as a benefice. Herbert was captured and imprisoned for two years until a coalition forced his release. During his captivity Fulk had taken over the government of Maine and before returning Herbert to his countship, he seized the southwestern territories of Maine including several fortresses, attaching them to Anjou. It was only after suffering complete humiliation that Herbert was allowed to go free.

Due in part to his wars with Bishop Avesguadus (an ally of Fulk Nerra) and in part with his imprisonment, the county of Maine declined under Herbert I. He built the castle of Sablé but by 1015 he had for some reason allowed it to become an independent lordship under the viscounts of Maine. Likewise, Chateau-du-Loir built in the early eleventh century also quickly came under control of independent castellans.

While plain coins with only Latin motto Gratia dei rex had been minted under comital authority throughout the tenth century at Le Mans, at some time between 1020 and 1030 coins were struck with the monogram of Count Herbert and the motto signum Dei vivi and continued with this design through the twelfth century. The coins at Le Mans were of such weight and fine quality they were among the most widely accepted in western France. Herbert died on 13 April 1035.

== Issue ==
Herbert left four children:

- Hugh IV, successor, married Bertha of Blois, daughter of Herbert's opponent Odo II of Blois.
- Gersenda, married firstly Theobald III of Blois (son of Herbert's opponent Odo II of Blois); divorced in 1048 and married secondly Albert Azzo II, Margrave of Milan. Her son by the latter would regain Maine from Norman control in 1069, as count Hugh V
- Paula (Paule or Paulæ) (Note: Marjorie Chibnall (ed.) calls her 'Paula' in The Ecclesiastical History of Orderic Vitalis, Volume II, Books III And IV (1993) pp. 304-5 note 2, while Forester's edition calls her 'Paule' in Ordericus Vitalis, Ecclesiastical History of England and Normandy, Vol II, (1854), p. 455 note 2; while earlier manuscripts call her 'Paulæ' in Orderic Vitalis, Vol. II, Book IV, p. 305.) wife of Jean de la Fleche, their son Elias would succeed his first cousin Hugh V as Count of Maine.
- Biota, married Walter III of the Vexin, and Walter briefly held Maine after the death of her nephew, Herbert II, son of Hugh IV, before both Walter and Biota died of possible poisoning and William the Conqueror seized the county.

== Sources ==
- Bachrach, Bernard S. (1993). Fulk Nerra, the Neo-Roman Consul, 987-1040. University of California Press.
- Barton, Richard (2004). Lordship in the County of Maine, C. 890-1160. The Boydell Press.
- Bradbury, Jim (2004). The Routledge Companion to Medieval Warfare. Routledge.
- Bradbury, Jim (2007). The Capetians: Kings of France, 987-1328. Hambledon Continuum.
- Bury, J.B. (1922). The Cambridge Medieval History. Vol. III. The Macmillan Company.
- Chibnall, Marjorie, ed. (1993). The Ecclesiastical History of Orderic Vitalis. Vol. II, Books III And IV. Clarendon Press.
- Fanning, Steven (1988). A Bishop and His World Before the Gregorian Reform: Hubert of Angers, 1006-1047. The American Philosophical Society.
- Freeman, Edward Augustus (1875). The History of the Norman Conquest of England, Its Causes and Its Results. Vol. III. Clarendon Press.
- Jessee, W. Scott (2000). Robert the Burgundian and the Counts of Anjou, Ca. 1025-1098. The Catholic University of America Press.
- Norgate, Kate (1887). England under the Angevin kings. Vol. 1. Macmillan & Co.

Preceded by Hugh III	Count of Maine; 1014–1036	Succeeded by Hugh IV
