= Herbert II =

Herbert II may refer to:

- Herbert II of Vermandois (884–943)
- Herbert II of Maine (died in 1062)
