= Goslin =

Goslin is the name of:

- Former name of the city of Murowana Goślina
- Bob Goslin (born 1928) was a New Zealand boxer
- Charles Goslin (1932–2007), American graphic designer and professor
- Goose Goslin (1900–1971), American baseball player
- Gregg Goslin, American politician
- Harry Goslin (1909–1943), English footballer
- Joscelin (Bishop of Paris) (died 886), Frankish bishop also known as Goslin

== See also ==
- Gauzlin (disambiguation)
