= Battle of Brissarthe =

Conflict between Frankish and joint Breton-Viking forces in 866 AD

- Part of Frankish–Viking battles and Franco-Breton wars
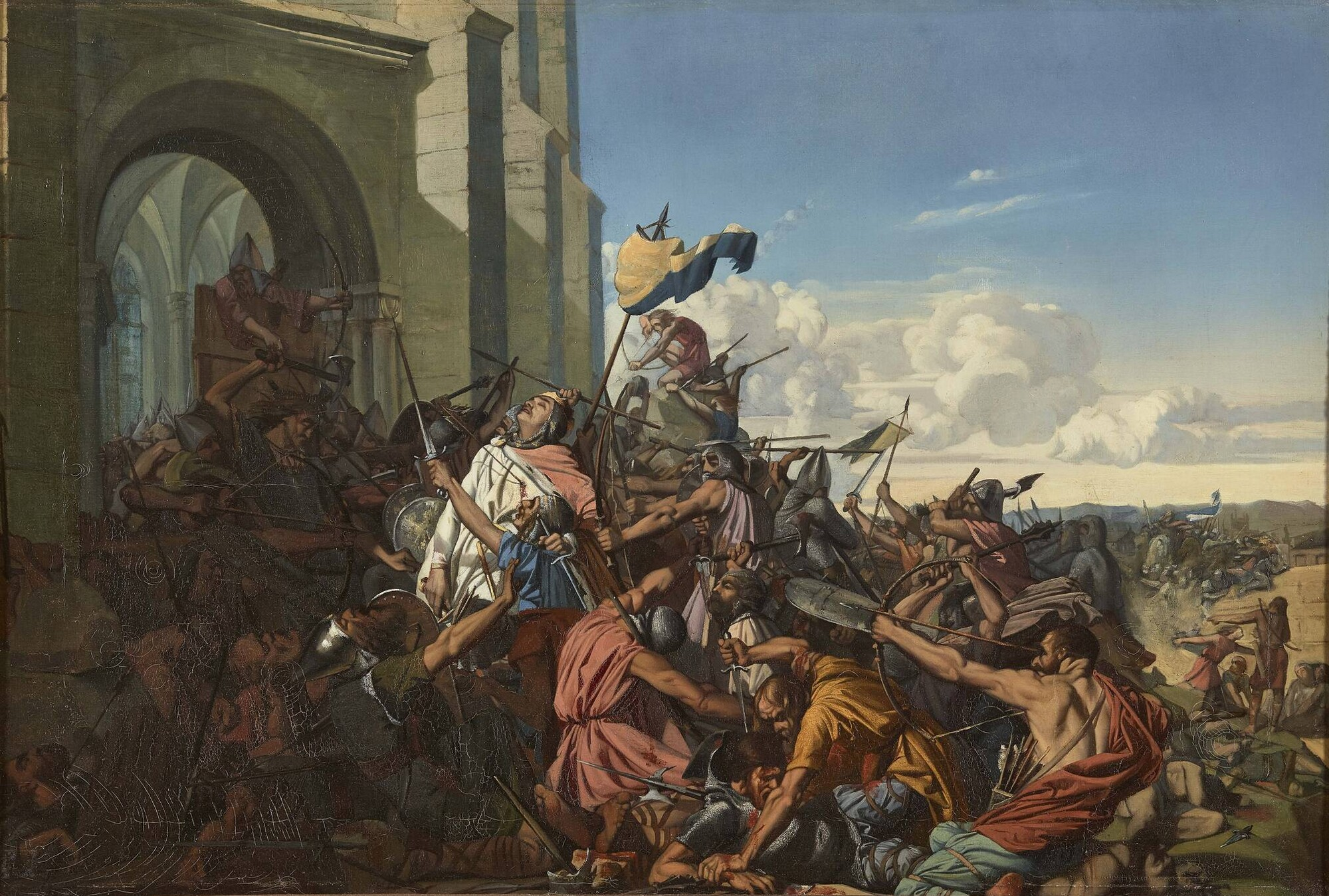
- Death of Robert the Strong at the combat of Brissarthe, 25 July 866 by Henri Lehmann, 1837
Location	Brissarthe, Neustria
Result	Breton-Viking victory
Territorial changes	Cotentin and possibly the Avranchin ceded to Brittany

Belligerents
West Francia	Kingdom of Brittany; Danish Vikings

Commanders and leaders
Robert the Strong †; Ranulf I of Aquitaine †; Gauzfrid of Maine; Hervé of Maine	Salomon; Hastein

The Battle of Brissarthe was fought on 2 July 866, between the West Franks and a joint Breton-Viking army near Brissarthe, Neustria. It was marked by the death of Robert the Strong, the Neustrian margrave, and Ranulf I, the duke of Aquitaine, and an ancestor of all the kings of France from 987 to 1848.

In 866, Salomon, Duke of Brittany, allied with Hastein (Hasting), a Danish chieftain, for an expedition into Anjou, Maine, and Touraine. In the course of the campaign, Le Mans was sacked. Robert, commander of the afflicted regions, assembled a large army to expel them. He was joined by Ranulf of the region of Poitou and by Gauzfrid and Hervé of Maine.

The Frankish army succeeded in intercepting the Danes before they reached their boats on the river Loire. The Danes attempted to take refuge in a church, but the Franks besieged them. During the night, the Danes attempted to escape. During the ensuing battle, Robert was killed, Ranulf mortally wounded by an arrow, and Hervé injured. With the loss of their leaders, the Franks had to retreat.

In 867, Charles the Bald entered negotiations with Salomon and recognised him as King of Brittany. He conceded the Cotentin and possibly the Avranchin to the Bretons. Hastein continued to ravage the Loire Valley for many more years. He and his forces attacked Bourges in 867, Orléans in 868, and Angers in 872. Charles appealed for assistance to Salomon.

== Primary sources ==
- Annales Bertiniani
