= Hugh II of Maine =

Hugh II, Count of Maine
- Born: c. 920
- Died: before 992
- Noble family: Counts of Maine
- Issue: Hugh III, Count of Maine; Fulk of Maine; Herbert of Maine
- Father: Hugh I, Count of Maine

Hugh II (920–before 992), Count of Maine, son of Hugh I, Count of Maine, and an unknown mother. He was, like his father, a vassal of his uncle Hugh the Great.

After the death of Hugh the Great, Hugh II allied with Fulk II the Good, Count of Anjou, and Theobald the Trickster, Count of Blois. Hugh later joined Theobald's son Odo against Seinfroy, Bishop of Le Mans. Hugh and Odo had to flee and seek refuge with Bouchard I, Count of Vendôme, in the areas that form the Bas-Vendômois.

In 939 he fought alongside Alan II, Duke of Brittany and Judicael Berengar against the Vikings at the Battle of Trans-la-Forêt.

Hugh and his wife had: Hugh III, Count of Maine, Fulk of Maine, (d. after 992) and Herbert “Baco” of Maine (d. after 1046), regent of Hugh IV, Count of Maine. Hugh was succeeded as Count of Maine by his son Hugh III.

== Sources ==
- Barton, Richard E. (2004). Lordship in the County of Maine, c. 890-1160. The Boydell Press.
- Cunliffe, Barry (2021). Bretons and Britons: The Fight for Identity. Oxford University Press.
- Mueller-Vollmer, Tristan; Wolf, Kirsten, eds. (2022). "Chronology". Vikings: An Encyclopedia of Conflict, Invasions, and Raids. ABC-CLIO.
