= Rorgon II of Maine =

French count

Rorgon II (c. 800 – c. 865) was the Count of Maine from 849–865.

He was the eldest son of Rorgon I. As Count, he succeeded Gauzbert (brother of Rorgon I). He died in 865 and was succeeded by his own brother, Gauzfrid.

== Sources ==
- Sheppard, Si (2022). The Viking Siege of Paris: Longships Raid the Seine, AD 885–86. Bloomsbury. ISBN 9781472845702.41
