= Joslin (surname) =

Joslin is a surname. Notable people with the surname include:

- Alfred H. Joslin (1914–1991), American judge
- Andrew Joslin (born 1989), English cricketer
- David B. Joslin (born 1936), American bishop
- Derek Joslin (born 1987), Canadian professional ice hockey defenceman
- Elliott P. Joslin (1869–1962), first doctor in the United States to specialize in the treatment of diabetes
- Graeme Joslin (born 1950), Australian rules footballer
- Jervis Joslin (1835–1899), American politician
- Joan Joslin (1923–2020), English codebreaker at Bletchley Park
- Les Joslin (born 1947), Australian cricketer
- Les Joslin (author) (born 1943), American retired naval officer, natural resource manager, educator, and author
- Margaret Joslin (1883–1956), American film actress
- Murray Joslin (1901–1981), American electrical engineer who made major contributions to nuclear power
- Peter Joslin (born 1933), British police officer, Chief Constable of Warwickshire Police and Deputy Lieutenant of Warwickshire
- Phil Joslin (footballer) (1916–1980), English professional footballer
- Phil Joslin (referee) (born 1959), English association football referee
- Raymond E. Joslin (1936–2013), American businessman and cable executive
- Rebecca Richardson Joslin (1846–1934), American author, lecturer, benefactor, clubwoman
- Samuel Joslin (born 2002), British film and television actor
- Sesyle Joslin (born 1929), American children's author
- Theodore Joslin (1890–1944), press secretary to President Herbert Hoover from 1931 to 1933
- William H. Joslin (1829–1926), American politician
