= Aaron ben Joseph of Beaugency =

Aaron ben Joseph of Beaugency was a French Bible commentator and rabbinical scholar, who flourished in the twelfth century at Beaugency, near Orléans. He was the contemporary of Rabbenu Tam (about 1110–75), with whom he maintained a scholarly correspondence.
