= Rorgonids =

Rorgonid
- Origin: Mayenne
- Founded: Eighth century
- Founder: Rorgon I, Count of Maine
- Cadet branches: House of Châteaudun

The Rorgonids were a powerful Frankish family dating from the eighth century. They are sometimes referred to as the first Mayennaise dynasty, referring to the city of Mayenne, and are the original counts of Maine. The Rorgonids were named after Rorgon I, Count of Maine, who was the progenitor of the dynasty. His son, Gauzfrid, Count of Maine, was the first to hold power in the Norman March of Neustria. The Rorgonids controlled the County of Maine throughout the ninth century. The Rorgonids and the Widonids competed for control of the Breton March through much of that time.

The first known ruler of Maine (called the Duke of Maine) was Charivius, who is conjectured by Christian Settipani to be the brother or nephew of Lambert, Count of Hesbaye. Further, Settipani identifies Charivius as a direct ancestor of the Rorgonids. Charivius was displaced as ruler of Maine by the Carolingians in 748, with his dynasty restored in 832.

The House of Châteaudun descended from Gauzfred I (or Geoffrey I) whom Count Theobald I of Blois made viscount of Châteaudun in 956. Recent research makes him a direct-line agnatic descendant of the Frankish family Rorgonides.

== Sources ==
- Barton, Richard E., Lordship in the County of Maine, c. 890-1160, Boydell Press, 2004 (available on Google Books)
- Christian Settipani. "Addendum to the Ancestors of Charlemagne" (PDF).
