= Brooklyn Org =

American nonprofit organization

- Formation: 2009
- Headquarters: Brooklyn, NY
- Executive director: Jocelynne Rainey
- Website: https://brooklyn.org/

Brooklyn Org, formerly known as The Brooklyn Community Foundation (BCF), is a public foundation dedicated to Brooklyn, NY.

== History ==
The Brooklyn Org originates out of the Independence Community Bank and the Independence Community Foundation connected to it. When the Independence Community Bank went public, money was set aside via the Independence Community Foundation to benefit the community of Brooklyn, Queens, and Staten Island. In 2006, when the bank was purchased, the money set aside via the Independence Community Foundation was evolved into the Brooklyn Community Foundation when it officially launched in 2009.

In 2021, Jocelynne Rainey was hired to lead Brooklyn Org. Rainey replaced Cecilia Clarke, who left the organization in July 2021 after holding the position since 2013 Under Rainey's leadership, Brooklyn Org has exceed $130 million in total giving while also expanding commitments to Brooklyn nonprofits focusing on community engagement and racial justice. In 2023, Rainey led a $49,000 rebranding of the Brooklyn Community Foundation, evolving the organization into Brooklyn Org.

=== Spark Prize ===
Brooklyn Org awards an annual Spark Prize that comes with a $100,000 gift.

=== Board ===
Alan Fishman stepped down in 2020 as board chair. Nicole Gueron and Harsha Marti were appointed co-chairs.

=== Brooklyn Org Volunteer Day ===
Brooklyn Org hosts a yearly borough-wide celebrations of community service with volunteer events across Brooklyn.
