= Herbert II of Maine =

Count of Maine from 1051 to 1062

Herbert II (died 9 March 1062) was Count of Maine from 1051 to 1062. He was a Hugonide, son of Hugh IV of Maine and Bertha of Blois.

On the death of Hugh IV, Geoffrey Martel, Count of Anjou occupied Maine, expelling Berthe de Blois and Gervais de Château du Loir, Bishop of Le Mans, who fled to the court of Normandy.

In 1056, Herbert escaped from Le Mans, and went to the court of William II, Duke of Normandy. There his sister Marguerite was betrothed to Robert Curthose, but died before the marriage could take place. Herbert paid homage to William for the county of Maine, was to marry, Adelida, a daughter of William, but died in 1062.

== Sources ==
- Aird, William M. (2008). Robert 'Curthose', Duke of Normandy (C. 1050-1134). The Boydell Press.
- Barlow, Frank (2000). William Rufus. Yale University Press.
- Douglas, David Charles (1966). William the Conqueror. University of California Press.
- van Houts, Elisabeth (2019). Married Life in the Middle Ages, 900-1300. Oxford University Press.
