= Geoffrey I, Viscount of Châteaudun =

Geoffrey I (Gauzfred I) (d. after 985), possibly the son of Geoffroy, Viscount of Chartres, is the first Viscount of Châteaudun and thus regarded as the founder of the House of Châteaudun, vassal of the House of Blois.

It is assumed that Geoffrey descended from Rorgon I, Count of Maine, and therefore part of the Rogonid/Rorgonid dynasty. Little is known about Geoffrey, other than he was closely associated with Hardouin, Archbishop of Tours.

Geoffrey married Ermengarde of an unknown family and had one child:

- Hugues, Viscount of Châteaudun

Geoffrey was succeeded by his son as Viscount of Châteaudun upon his death. There are differing accounts about Geoffrey and his offspring. One prominent theory is that Geoffrey and Hughes were the same person, and that Ermengarde was Geoffrey’s first wife, and Hildegard, the wife of Hughes, was his second.

== Sources ==
Boussard, Jacques, L'origine des familles seigneuriales dans la région de la Loire moyenne, Cahiers de Civilisation Médiévale 5, 1962

Phalle, Édouard de Saint, Comtes de Troyes et de Poitiers au IXe siècle: histoire d’un double échec. In Christian Settipani and Katharine S. B. Keats-Rohan, Onomastique et Parenté dans l'Occident médiéval. 2000.

Kerrebrouck, Patrick van., Nouvelle histoire généalogique de l'auguste maison de France, vol. 1: La Préhistoire des Capétiens. 1993.

Tout, Thomas Frederick, The Empire and the Papacy: 918-1273, Periods of European History, London: Rivingtons, 1928
