= Beaugency =

- Commune
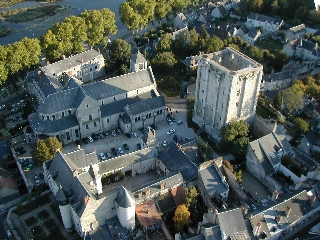
- Château de Beaugency

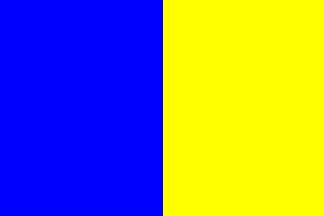
- Flag Coat of arms
- Location of Beaugency
- Location within France Location within Centre-Val de Loire
- Coordinates: 47°46′45″N 1°37′57″E
- Country: France
- Region: Centre-Val de Loire
- Department: Loiret
- Arrondissement: Orléans
- Canton: Beaugency

Government
  - Mayor (2020–2026): Jacques Mesas
- Area^{1}: 16.45 km^{2} (6.35 sq mi)
- Elevation: 98 m (322 ft)
- Highest elevation: 118 m (387 ft)
- Lowest elevation: 78 m (256 ft)
- Population (2023): 8,024
  - Density: 487.8/km^{2} (1,263/sq mi)
- Time zone: UTC+01:00 (CET)
  - Summer (DST): UTC+02:00 (CEST)
- INSEE/Postal code: 45028 /45190
- ^{1} French Land Register data, which excludes lakes, ponds, glaciers > 1 km^{2} (0.386 sq mi or 247 acres) and river estuaries.

Beaugency (French pronunciation: [boʒɑ̃si]) is a commune in the Loiret department, Centre-Val de Loire, north-central France. It is located on the Loire river, upriver (northeast) from Blois and downriver from Orléans.

== History ==
Medieval

Aaron ben Joseph of Beaugency and Eliezer of Beaugency were Bible commentators and rabbinical scholars, who flourished in the twelfth century in the city.

Lords of Beaugency

The lords of Beaugency attained considerable importance in the 11th, 12th and 13th centuries; at the end of the 13th century they sold the fiefdom to the Crown. They were responsible for building Château de Beaugency, which as originally a wooden structure, later replaced with a stone one by Lancelin I de Beaugency, the first lord of Beaugency. The massive original keep is today a ruined shell, surrounded by a mansion built later on in the 14th century.

The family that became the lords or Seigneurs of Beaugency started with Landry sore. His son Lancelin I established the family as the Seigneurs and accordingly they took the last name 'de Beaugency' (of Beaugency) which was a common practise among the nobility.

Lancelin I replaced the wooden castle with a stone one.

Jean de la Flèche, a younger son of Lancelin I de Beaugency, was born at the castle and later succeeded his father as the second lord of La Flèche. He was also granted lands in Yorkshire, England by William the Conqueror and some of his decedents settled there and became the Fletcher family. He Married Paula of Maine and they were father to Elias I, Count of Maine, grandfather to King Henry II of England.

Between 1067-1069 Lancelin II succeeds his father as the second lord of Beaugency. In 1080 he goes on a pilgrimage to Rome and his son, Ralph ruled the lordship of Beaugency in his absence.

In 1091 the third lord of Beaugency is Ralph I (1065-1130) who took part in the First Crusade as a retainer in the forces of Stephen, Count of Blois, (father of Stephen, King of England) who he was listed as 'one of his best men'. Ralph became known for his bravery in defending an important gate during the siege of Antioch in the Spring of 1098. He returned from Crusade in 1101 and marries Mathilda of Vermandois, daughter of Hugh the Great, Count of Vermandois and niece to the king of France.

Following this union, the Beaugency lords adopted a coat-of-arms similar to that of the Count of Vermandois - Chequy or and azure, a fesse gules (very similar to the de Clifford family) and 3 white Plate Roundels. This practice was also carried out by other prominent noble families linked to Vermandois, including Ralph I's brother in laws Robert de Beaumont, 1st Earl of Leicester and afterwards William de Warenne, 2nd Earl of Surrey on their marriage to his wife's younger sister, Elizabeth of Vermandois, Countess of Leicester. The Arms used by the de Warenne Earl of Surrey are quartered and are still used by their relations, the Dukes of Norfolk. The arms of the Earl's of Surrey are still used as the Flag of the English county of Surry.

11 March 1152 the council of Beaugency annulled the marriage between Eleanor of Aquitaine and Louis VII at Notre-Dame de Beaugency.

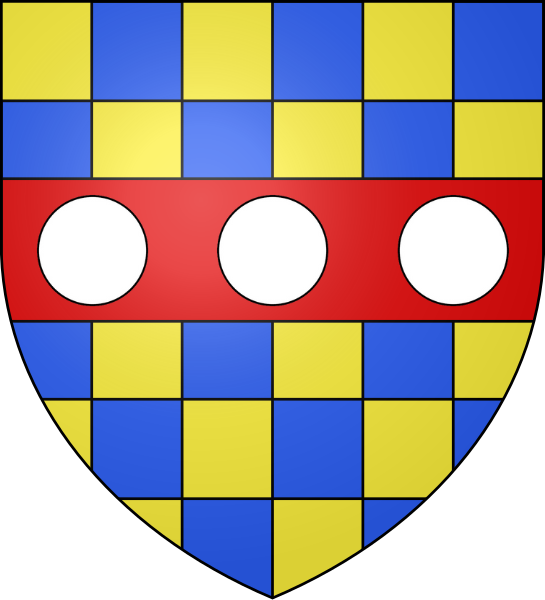
Coat of arms used by the de Beaugency family from after Ralph I

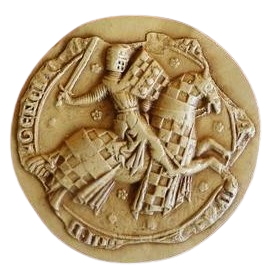
Seal used by Ralph I de Beaugency

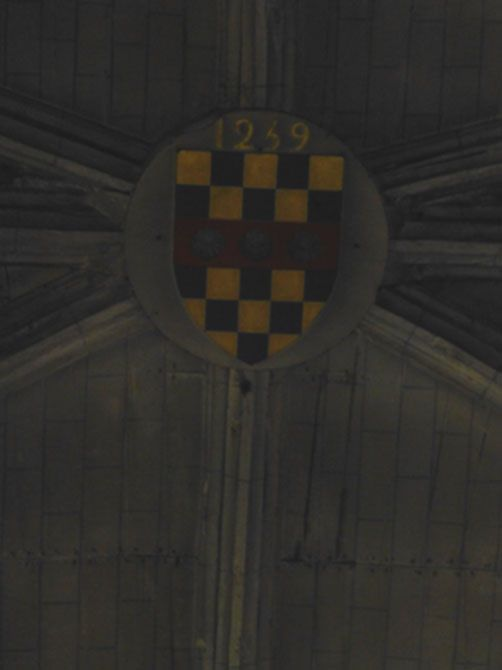
Coat of arms of the de Beaugency family Notre-Dame de Beaugency

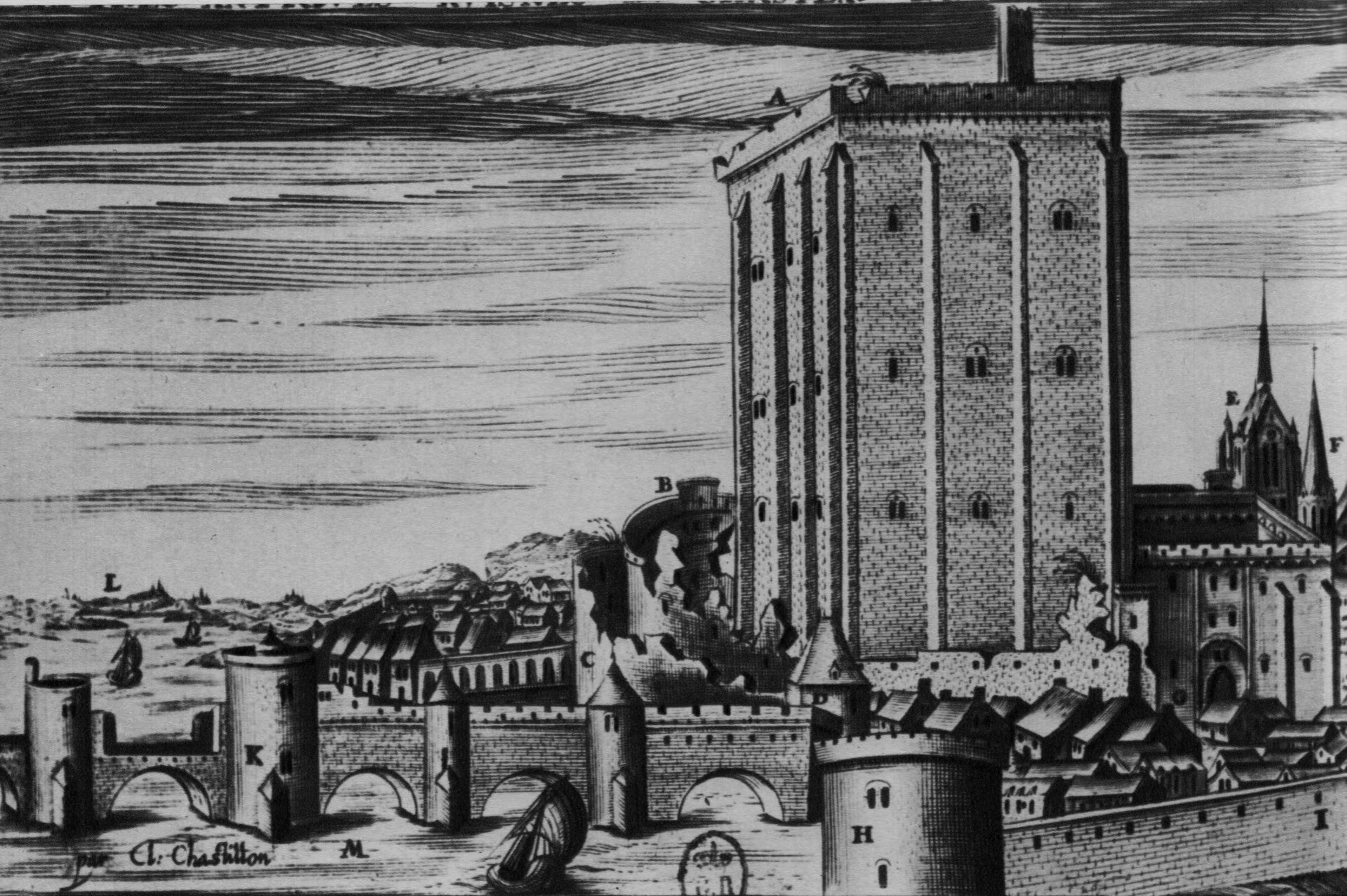
Chateau Beaugency Engraving of the XVII century by Claude de Chastillon

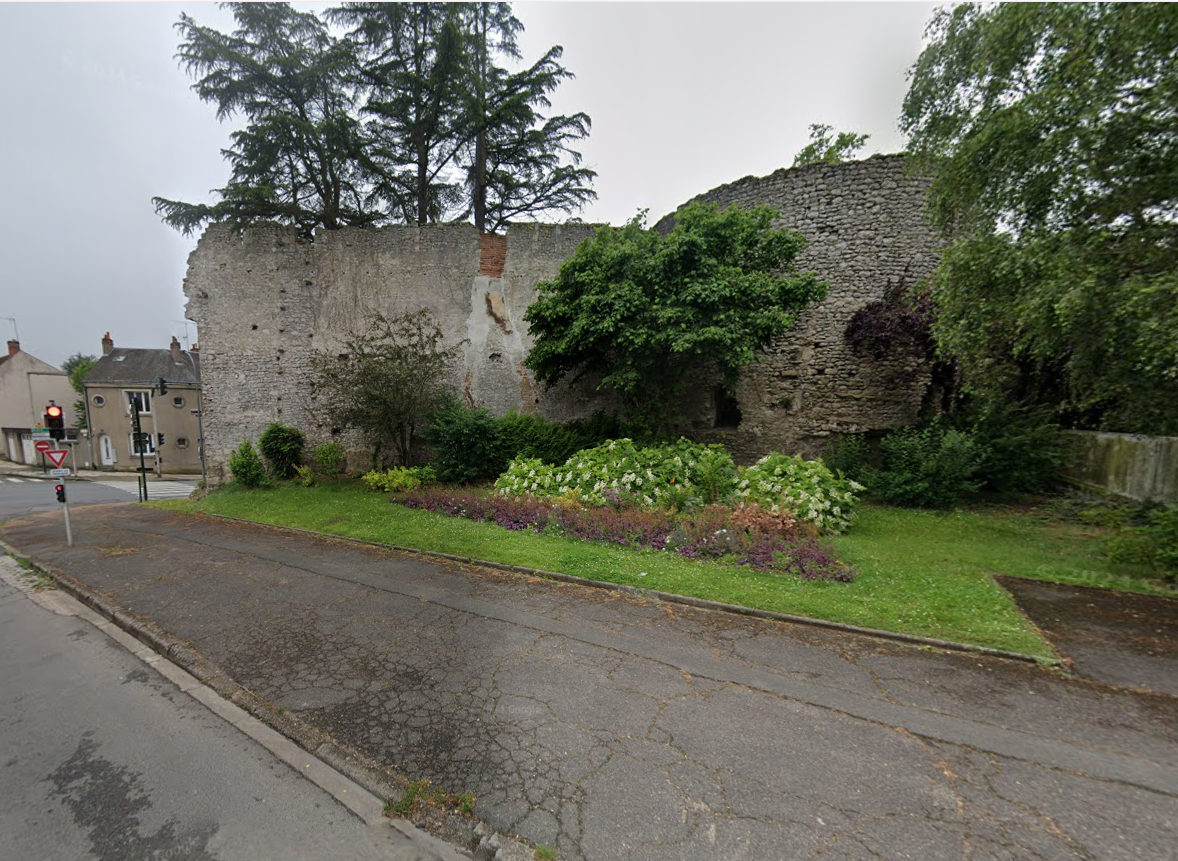
Remains of Beaugency northern outer wall defences and tower

Renaissance

Afterward it passed to the house of Orléans, then to those of Dunois and Longueville, and ultimately again to that of Orléans.

The city of Beaugency has been the site of numerous military conflicts. It was occupied on four separate occasions by the English. On 16–17 June 1429, it was the site of the famous Battle of Beaugency, when it was freed by Joan of Arc. Beaugency also played an important strategic role in the Hundred Years' War. It was burned by the Protestants in 1567 and suffered extensive damage to the walls, the castle, and the church.

Modern

On 8, 9 and 10 December 1870 the Prussian army, commanded by the grand-duke of Mecklenburg, defeated the French army of the Loire, under General Chanzy, in the second battle of Beaugency (or Villorceau-Josnes). It was fought on the right bank of the Loire to the northwest of Beaugency.

In 1940 and again in 1944, the city was bombed by Nazi Germany. On 16 September 1944, German Major General Botho Henning Elster surrendered his 18 850 men and 754 officers at the Loire bridge of Beaugency to the U.S. Army after being harassed and surrounded by the French Résistance.

== Population ==
Historical population

Year	Pop.	±% p.a.
1793	4,515	—
1800	4,842	+1.00%
1806	4,520	−1.14%
1821	4,920	+0.57%
1831	4,883	−0.08%
1836	4,849	−0.14%
1841	4,844	−0.02%
1846	4,851	+0.03%
1851	5,258	+1.62%
1856	5,072	−0.72%
1861	5,052	−0.08%
1866	5,029	−0.09%
1872	4,635	−1.35%
1876	4,466	−0.92%
1881	4,439	−0.12%
1886	4,544	+0.47%
1891	4,313	−1.04%
1896	3,994	−1.53%
1901	3,761	−1.19%

Year	Pop.	±% p.a.
1906	3,635	−0.68%
1911	3,532	−0.57%
1921	3,250	−0.83%
1926	3,292	+0.26%
1931	3,502	+1.24%
1936	3,560	+0.33%
1946	3,573	+0.04%
1954	4,052	+1.58%
1962	4,401	+1.04%
1968	5,530	+3.88%
1975	6,534	+2.41%
1982	7,190	+1.38%
1990	6,917	−0.48%
1999	7,106	+0.30%
2007	7,648	+0.92%
2012	7,501	−0.39%
2017	7,298	−0.55%
2023	8,024	+1.59%

Source: EHESS and INSEE (1968-2023)

== Economy ==
Until 1846 Beaugency was an important commercial center due to trade along the Loire. After trade moved from the river to rail traffic, the city's role changed. Beaugency became a market center for the surrounding agricultural district. Today Beaugency's economy depends largely on tourism.

== Sights ==
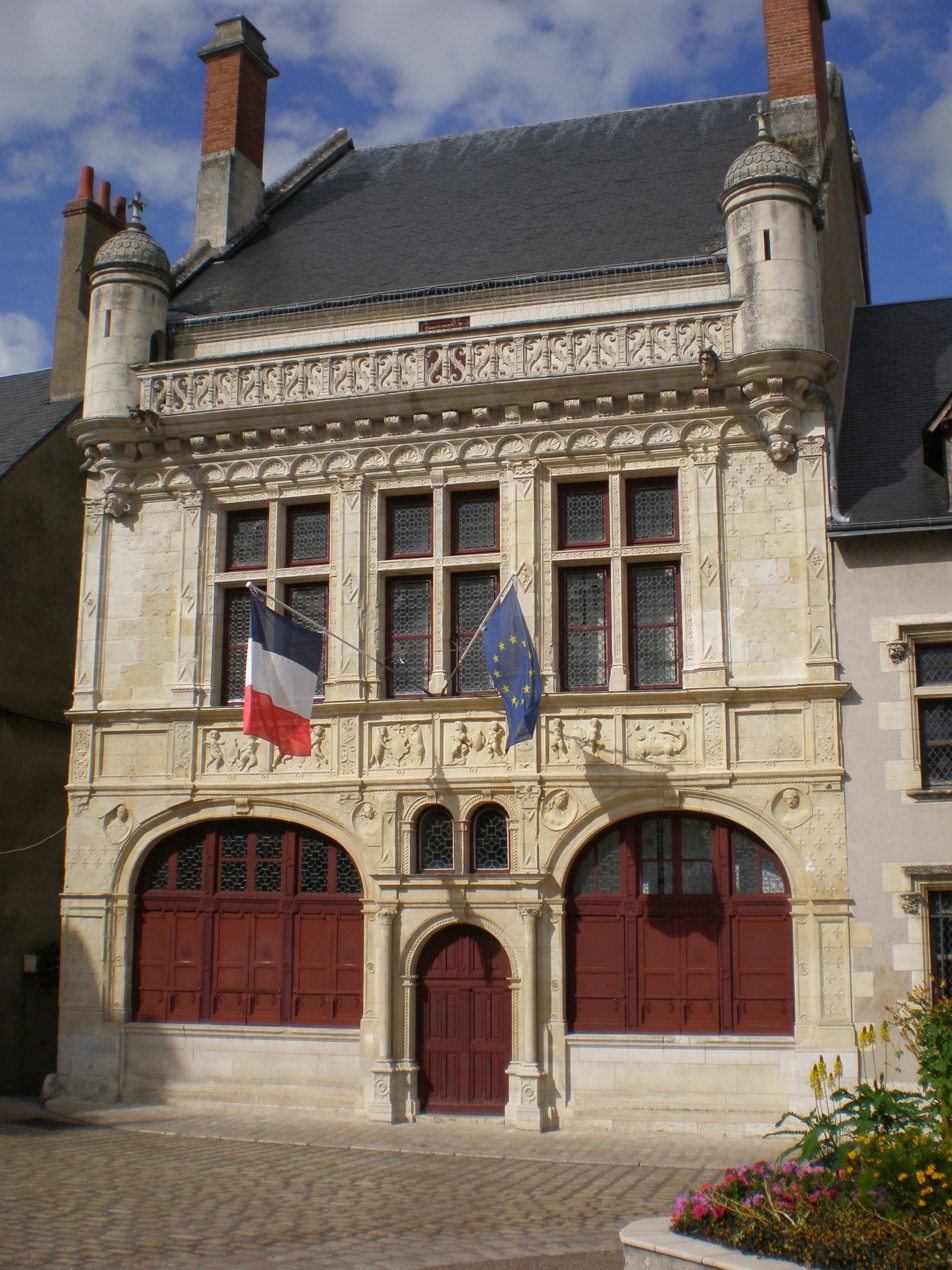
City hall

- Medieval keep (11th century) 47°46′39″N 1°37′59″E
- Lock of Dunois (14-15th century)
- Church Saint Etienne (11th century)
- Abbey church (12th century)
- City hall (16th century)
- Bridge (14th century)

== Sources ==
- Livingstone, Amy (2018). Medieval Lives c. 1000-1292: The World of the Beaugency. Routledge. ISBN 978-1138677081.
