= Gauzbert of Maine =

Gauzbert (French pronunciation: [ɡozbɛ̃ʁ]; died 853) was Count of Maine from 840 to 853. He was a member of the Rorgonide family, son of Gauzlin I of Maine, lord of Maine, and Adeltrude.

He is recorded for the first time in 839 in a charter of his brother Count Rorgon I of Maine. Rorgon died shortly afterwards, leaving very young children, and Gauzbert took over the government, organising the defense of the County of Maine against the Vikings. He also fought against Lambert II, Count of Nantes. In 852 he killed Lambert in an ambush.

In 853, Gauzbert's overlord Charles the Bald accused him of making an alliance with the Bretons, who were in revolt against him, and, according to some reports, had him executed. The execution is said to have incited other Frankish grandees to revolt and appeal for help to Charles' half-brother and rival Louis the German. However, according to the Chronique de Saint-Maixent, Gauzbert was ambushed and killed by citizens of Nantes in revenge for the death of Lambert.

It is not known whether he was married or had children. He was succeeded by his nephew Rorgon II of Maine.
