= Eliezer of Beaugency =

Eliezer of Beaugency was a Jewish Bible exegete from the northern French city of Beaugency who lived during the twelfth century.

== Biography and works ==
Eliezer was born at Beaugency, capital of a canton in the department of Loiret. A student of Rashbam, Eliezer was one of the most distinguished representatives of Rashbam's school and of the exegesis of northern France. His chief concern was to find the connection between successive verses and the sequence of thought, a method that is also characteristic of the system of interpretation employed by Rashbam as well as Joseph Kara. Not concerned with grammatical observations or daring criticisms, he reached very happy results in explaining certain figurative passages in accordance with the metaphors employed in the context. He often used French terms to express his thoughts more clearly. His interpretation is entirely free from midrashic admixture. He was particularly interested in dating the Biblical prophecies and identifying the events mentioned in them.

Of his works, the commentaries on Isaiah and Hosea were published prior to 1906. There still exists in manuscript a commentary on the prophet Ezekiel. Extracts from his commentary on Job are also extant; and he himself refers to his commentary on Genesis. His commentaries on Amos and Jonah were published in 2018. All his commentaries on the Twelve Prophets were published in Artscroll's Czuker edition of Mikraos Gedolos.
