= Jean de la Flèche =

11th-century nobleman

- Born: c. 1030
- Died: 1097
- Noble family: de La Flèche-de Baugency
- Spouse: Paula of Maine
- Issue: Elias I de la Flèche
- Father: Lancelin I de Beaugency
- Mother: Mathilde de Chateau du Loir

Jean de la Flèche, also known as Jean de Beaugency, Seigneur de la Flèche (c. 1030 – c. 1097) was an 11th-century nobleman. He was a younger son of Lancelin I de Beaugency and Adelberg de Maine and was born about 1030 in La Flèche, Sarthe. (Note: Amy Livingstone indicates Jean's mother was Paula of Maine)

Jean's father Lancelin I, was the first lord of both Beaugency and La Flèche. On his death, the older son Lancelin II was given Beaugency, while Jean became lord of La Flèche. In 1059, Jean married Paula of Maine, daughter of Herbert I, Count of Maine. Jean and Paula were the parents of Elias I, Count of Maine, who married Mathilde de Château-du-Loir. He was a great great grandfather of King Henry II.

Jean de la Fleche was given land in Yorkshire, England, and this is where the name was first recorded.

== Sources ==
- Livingstone, Amy (2018). Medieval Lives c. 1000–1292: The World of the Beaugency. Routledge. ISBN 978-1138677081.
- LoPrete, Kimberly A. (2007). Adela of Blois: Countess and Lord (c.1067-1137). Four Courts Press. ISBN 978-1-85182-563-9.
