= Graeme Joslin =

Australian rules footballer

Personal information
- Full name: Graeme Joslin
- Born: 30 June 1950 (age 76)
- Original team: University High School Old Boys
- Height: 183 cm (6 ft 0 in)
- Weight: 86 kg (190 lb)

Playing career^{1}
Years	Club	Games (Goals)
1969–71	Footscray	24 (0)
- ^{1} Playing statistics correct to the end of 1971.

Graeme Joslin a.k.a. Papa Jum (born 30 June 1950) is a former Australian rules footballer who played with Footscray in the Victorian Football League (VFL).
