= Marches of Neustria =

Collection of march fiefdoms in West Francia

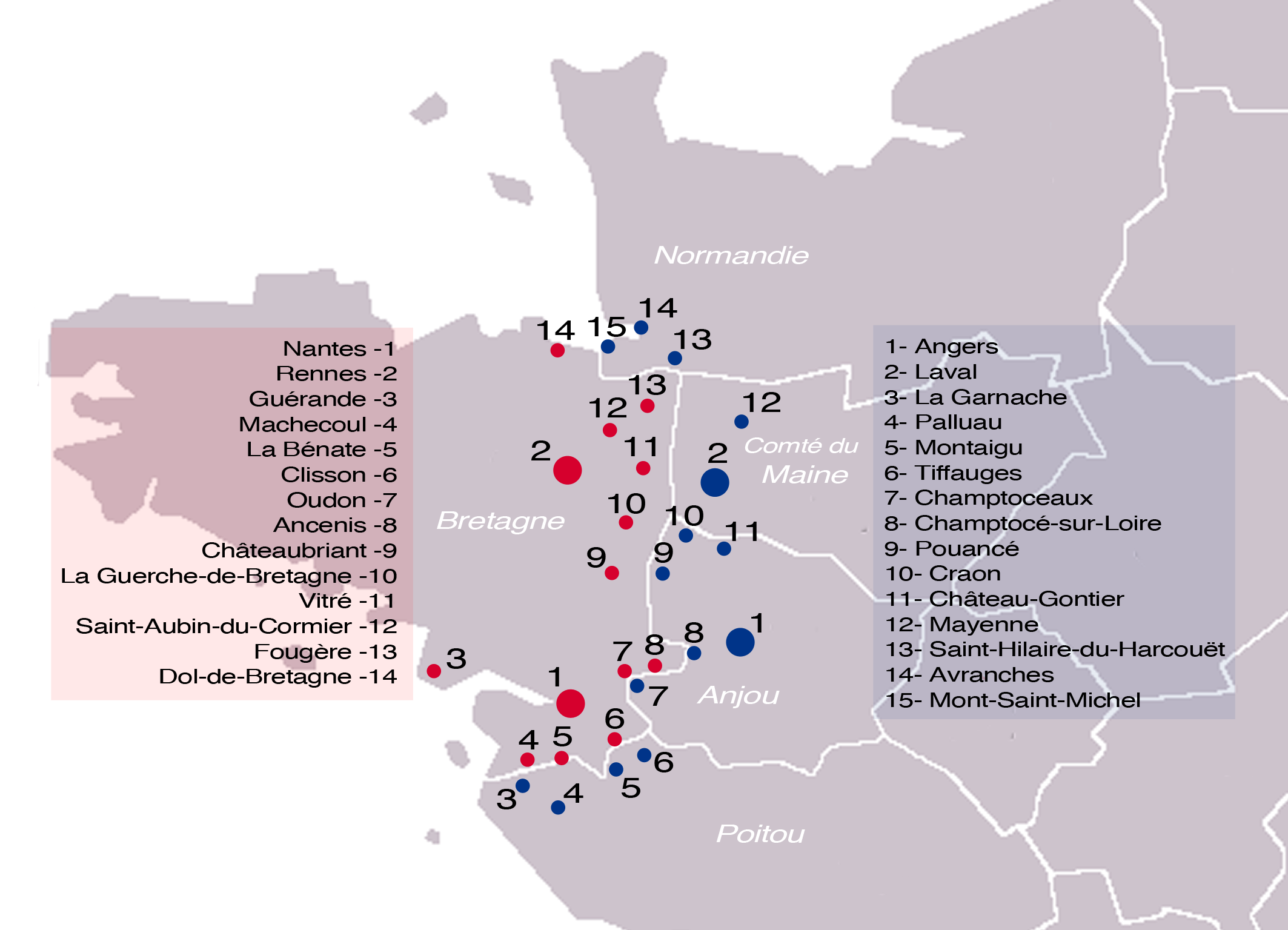
Fortresses of the Breton March.

The Marches of Neustria (French: Marches de Neustrie; Breton: Marz Neustria; Norman: Maurches de Neûtrie) were two marches created in 861 by the Carolingian king of West Francia Charles the Bald. They were ruled by officials appointed by the Monarchy of France (or the Crown), known as wardens, prefects or margraves (French: marquis). One march (the Breton March) was created as a buffer against the Bretons and the other (the Norman March) against the Norsemen.

Ultimately, for the Breton March alone, some 29 strongholds across several 'provinces' were constructed or fortified and designated to serve as fortresses of the march.

In 911, Robert I of France, the incumbent margrave of Breton March, was affirmed/appointed margrave of both marches by king Charles the Simple, and took the title demarchus. His family, the later Capetians, ruled the whole of Neustria until 987, when Hugh Capet was elected King of the Franks. The subsidiary counts of Neustria had exceeded the margrave in power by that time and the peak of Viking and Breton raiding had passed. After Hugh Capet became King of the Franks, no further margraves were appointed.

== Breton March ==
The original march of Brittany was created and militarized under the Merovingians in the late 7th or early 8th century. Although its exact extent is unknown and its boundaries do not coincide with the later Breton March; it included the Rennais and Nantais territories (French: pays), and parts of the Vannetais and Maine. Administration centered in Le Mans and the territory eventually went by the name of ducatus Cenomannicus or Duchy of Maine. One of the most famous margraves ("Britannici limitis praefectus") was Roland, who died at the Battle of Roncesvalles in 778 and gave rise to a famous series of legends as exemplified in the eponymous Chanson de Roland.

The Carolingian king of the Franks, Charles the Bald, re-created the Breton March in 861 and appointed Robert the Strong margrave. In 863, Charles negotiated the Treaty of Entrammes with Salomon, King of Brittany whereby western Anjou was recognised as a part of Brittany and the lay abbacy of Saint-Aubin in Angers was granted to Salomon, who commended himself to Charles and paid tribute.

Robert was killed fighting the Vikings in 866, revealing how the boundaries of the marches did not affect the raiders with which the marcher margraves had to deal nor prevent the two margraves from cooperating in each other's territories against the common enemies of the Franks. Hugh the Abbot succeeded to Robert's office and title. In 885, Charles the Fat succeeded to power in West Francia and after Hugh's death in 886, Charles gave the title to Robert the Strong's son, Odo. After Charles' death in 888, Odo became king of the Franks and appointed Robert I margrave of the Breton March. Odo died in 898 and was succeeded as king by Charles the Simple who confirmed Robert's titles and possessions.

== Norman March ==
Adalard the Seneschal served as warden of the Norman March from 861 to 865. His march extended over the county of Le Mans and he was immediately opposed by the Rorgonids, who controlled the city. They intrigued against him and his relatives, also powerful nobles in the region, until Charles revoked his grants to them and placed the Rorgonids at the head of the March.

Under a peace, Charles transferred the Norman March to Gauzfrid, Count of Maine, the representative of the Rorgonids. He was followed by Ragenold who was margrave between 878 and 885. In 885, Charles the Fat came to power in West Francia and named Henry of Franconia margrave of the Norman March. In 886, Henry died and Charles the Fat replaced him with Berengar II. Berengar died in 896, and it is not known who succeeded him.

== United marches ==
In 911, Charles the Simple made peace with the Viking leader Rollo in the Treaty of Saint-Clair-sur-Epte, which granted Rollo the county of Rouen.

Robert I, the margrave of the Breton March, was also granted the Norman March and the two entities became permanently united. Robert took the title of demarchus, a title which Rollo later also took. Robert I was margrave until his death in 922, and was succeeded by Hugh the Great who was margrave until 956, and was followed in turn by Hugh Capet, who became king of the Franks in 987.

Rouen was the basis of the future Duchy of Normandy. The Normans gradually expanded their territory and incorporated much of Neustria into it. When Hugh Capet became king of the Franks in 987, the history of the march came to an end, to be replaced by the history of the various comital fiefs which were to rise in power within it.

== List of margraves ==
Norman March
- 861 – 865 Adalard the Seneschal
- 861 – 865 Udo
- 861 – 865 Berengar I

Breton March
- 861 – 866 Robert I
- 865 – 878 Gauzfrid
- 878 – 885 Ragenold
- 884 – 886 Henry of Franconia
- 866 – 886 Hugh the Abbot
- 886 – 896 Berengar II
- 896 – 911 unknown
- 886 – 888 Odo
- 888 – 911 Robert, united marches
United marches
- 911 – 922 Robert
- 922 – 956 Hugh the Great
- 956 – 987 Hugh Capet

== Sources ==
- Smith, Julia M. H. Province and Empire: Brittany and the Carolingians. Cambridge University Press: 1992.
- Guillotel, Hubert. "Une autre marche de Neustrie." Onomastique et Parenté dans l'Occident médiéval. Edited Christian Settipani and Katharine S. B. Keats-Rohan. 2000.
