= Elias I of Maine =

11th- and 12th-century count of Maine

- Died: 11 July 1110
- Noble family: de La Flèche-de Beaugency
- Spouses: Matilda of Château-du-Loir; Agnes of Poitou Beatrice of Aquitaine?
- Issue: Eremburga
- Father: Jean de la Flèche
- Mother: Paula of Maine

Elias I (also Hélie or Élie) (died 11 July 1110), called de la Flèche or de Baugency, was the count of Maine, succeeding his cousin Hugh V.

He was the son of Jean de la Flèche (also known as Jean de Beaugency) and Paula, daughter of Count Herbert I of Maine. Elias succeeded his father as the third lord of La Flèche.

== Life ==
During the revolt of 1091, which installed his cousin Hugh V of Maine as count, Elias supported him, taking over the castle of Ballon, and imprisoning Hoel, bishop of Le Mans, at his castle of La Flèche. Hugh was finally unable to build a sustainable position in the county, and sold it to Elias for 10,000 shillings in 1092.

After some peaceful years, he declared for the crusade in 1096, but later decided not to go, since William Rufus let him know that he planned to retake Maine. There was a first round of conflict in February–April 1098, where Robert of Bellême played a key role as William's ally. After some initial successes against Robert, Elias was captured and imprisoned (28 April 1098). At this point, Count Fulk IV of Anjou, whose son Geoffrey was engaged to Elias's daughter Eremburga, intervened, entering Le Mans. William started campaigning again in June, obtained the surrender of the castle of Ballon but was unable to take Le Mans. An unsuccessful Angevin attack on Ballon allowed William to take many prisoners and force a peace treaty. By its terms, Elias was released, but Maine remained under William's control.

Elias was unhappy with the outcome, and there was a fallout between him and William. Elias's wife Matilda died in March 1099, and soon afterwards, he resumed the war against William, besieging Le Mans. The ensuing hostilities burned the city, but the Norman garrison resisted in the forts. A quick and strong intervention by William forced Elias's retreat, but William could not press his advantage, since he was unable to take Mayet, where Elias's troops made a stand.

After William's death in 1100, Elias and Fulk took over Le Mans and expelled the Norman garrison, which surrendered after not obtaining help either from the Duke Robert Curthose or King Henry Beauclerc. It is likely that Henry surrendered his claims to Maine in exchange for Elias's support, since from this point on Elias supported the king in almost all his regional conflicts. In the king's conflict with Robert Curthose, he led a sizable Manceaux contingent in the campaign of 1105, was present at the siege of Bayeux, and was a crucial ally at the decisive Battle of Tinchebray in 1106, where he commanded the Manceaux/Breton infantry which inflicted heavy casualties on the enemy. The only exception was his abrupt withdrawal at the siege of Falaise.

After Elias' death, the county of Maine passed to his daughter Eremburga and her husband, Fulk V of Anjou.

== Family ==
In 1090 Elias married Matilda, daughter of Gervais II, Lord of Château-du-Loir. They had a daughter, Eremburga, who married Fulk V of Anjou.

In 1109, says Orderic Vitalis, Elias remarried to Agnes, the daughter of Duke William VIII of Aquitaine and widow of King Alfonso VI of Castile. However, it seems likely that Orderic confused two different wives of Alfonso, and that it was the latter's widow, the Frenchwoman Beatrice, known to have returned to her homeland on Alfonso's death, whom Elias married. She died the following year, however.

He died on 11 July 1110 and was buried in the choir of the abbey church Notre-Dame de la Couture in Le Mans.

== Sources ==
- Barlow, Frank (1983). William Rufus. University of California Press.
- Busson, G.; Ledru, A. (1906). Nécrologe-obituaire de la cathédrale du Mans. Le Mans.
- De Salazar y Acha, Jaime (1992–1993). "Contribución al reinado de Alfonso VI de Castilla: algunas aclaraciones sobre su política matrimonial". Anales de la Real Academia Matritense de Heráldica y Genealogía (2): 301–336.
- Guillot, Olivier (1972). Le Comté d'Anjou et son Entourage au XIe siècle. Paris, Picard.
- Hollister, Charles Warren (2001). Henry I. Yale University Press.
- Latouche, Robert (1910). Histoire du Comté de Maine pendant le X et le Xie siècle. Paris, Champion.
- Martínez Diez, Gonzalo (2003). Alfonso VI: Señor del Cid, conquistador de Toledo. Temas de Hoy, S.A.
- Vitalis, Orderic (1854). The Ecclesiastical History of England and Normandy. Translated by Forester, Thomas. Henry G. Bohn, London.
