= Hugh III of Maine =

Former Count of Maine

Hugh III count of Maine
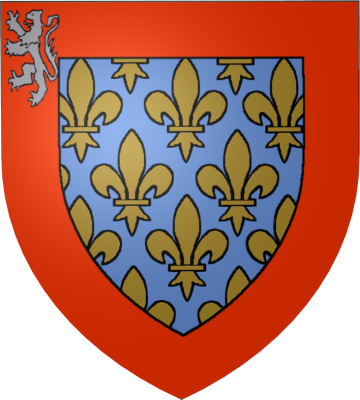
- Arms of the Counts of Maine (modern depiction)
- Born: c. 960
- Died: c. 1015
- Noble family: Hugonide; Carolingian
- Issue: Herbert I, Count of Maine
- Father: Hugh II, Count of Maine

Hugh III (c. 960 – c. 1015) became Count of Maine on his father Hugh II's death, c. 991.

== Life ==
He was the son of Hugh II, Count of Maine and succeeded his father as Count of Maine c. 991 He constructed the fortress at Sablé but by 1015 it ended up being held by the viscounts of Maine. He was a supporter of Richard II, Duke of Normandy. (Note: K.S.B. Keats-Rohan believes they were brothers-in-law, see: K.S.B. Keats-Rohan, Poppa of Bayeux And Her Family, The American Genealogist, Vol. 72 No.4, (July/October 1997), p. 194 & n. 26) Allied with Odo II, Count of Blois, he fought against the kings Hugh Capet and Robert II of France, but he was forced to acknowledge the Count of Anjou as his suzerain. During the siege of Tillières, Hugh narrowly escaped from the Norman forces pursuing him by disguising himself as a local shepherd. Throughout the tenth century the dynasty of counts of Maine, of which Hugh III, his father Hugh II, and grandfather Hugh I were all members struggled to control both the city of Le Mans and church investitures and in that effort were in near constant warfare with the Bishops of Le Mans, notably Segenfridus and Avesgaudus. Between 995 and 1015 Hugh III donated several properties including four vineyards and three mills in Le Mans to the monks of Mont Saint-Michel In Normandy. When approached by Abbot Hildebert in 1014 in requesting more land in the area of Le Mans, Hugh III generously gave the land of Voivres and personally placed the offering on the altar at Mont Saint-Michel. Hugh died c. 1014–1015.

Map of the county of Maine

== Issue ==
While the name of his wife is not known it is very probable she was a sister of Judith of Rennes wife of Richard II, Duke of Normandy. Their son was:

- Herbert I, Count of Maine who succeeded him.

== Notes ==
Preceded by Hugh II	Count of Maine c.991–c.1014	Succeeded by Herbert I
