= Charivius =

8th-century Frankish Duke of Maine

Charivius (French Hervé) was the Frankish Duke of Maine (dux Cenomannicus) in the early eighth century. His father was Chrotgar, Duke of Maine, son or grandson of Chrodbert, count Palatine of Chlothar III, and so brother of Lambert, Count of Hesbaye. In 723 he seized the revenues of the Diocese of Le Mans. On the death of the bishop Herlemund he took control of the see and its monasteries and appointed his illiterate son Gauciolenus (fr) bishop. Though the date of Charivius' death is unknown, his son retained control of the diocese and the region as bishop until 771. Charivius is postulated by Settipani to be an ancestor of the Rorgonids.
