= Jocelyn Chng =

Singaporean businesswoman

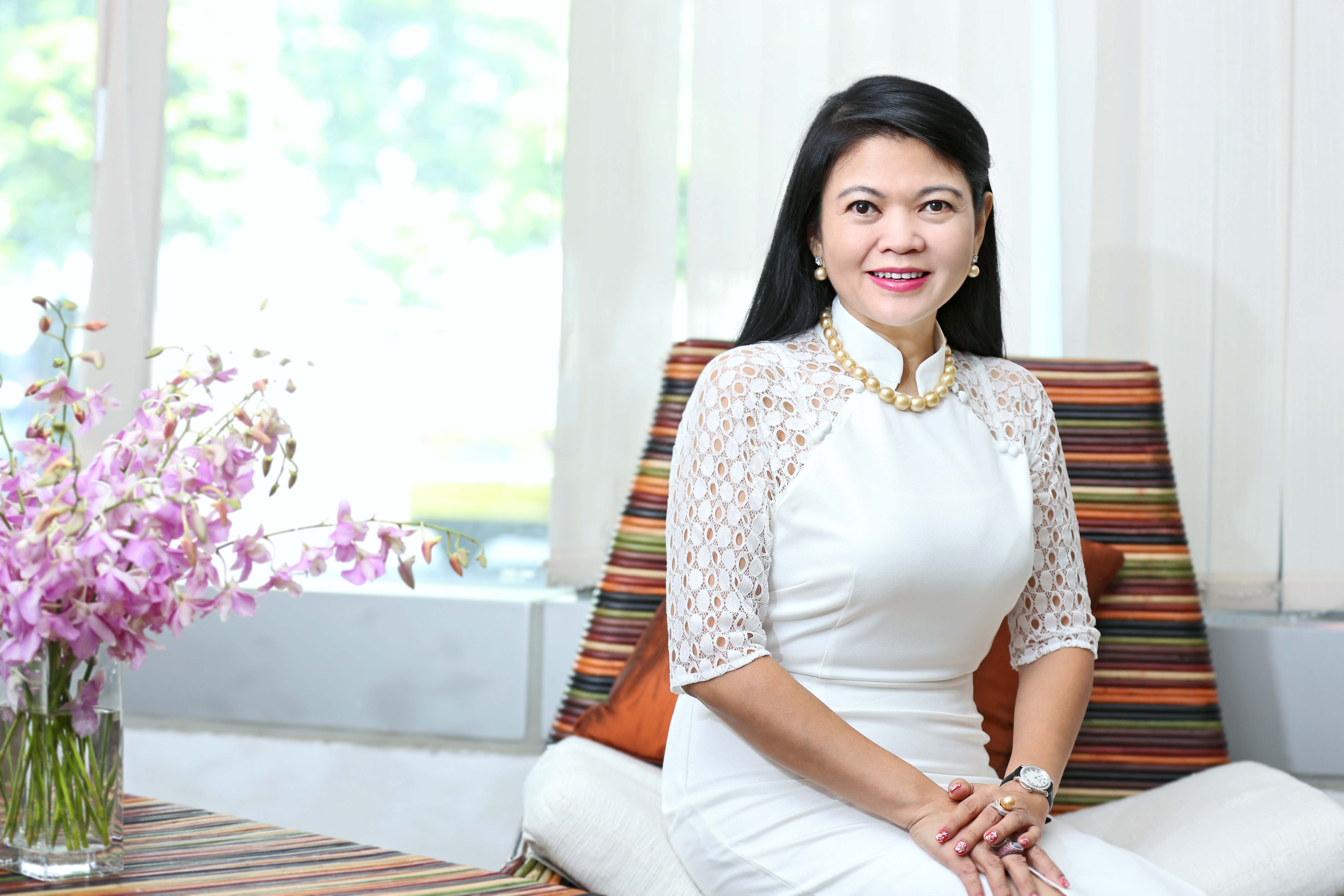
- Born: Singapore
- Other name: Chng Yee Kwang
- Education: National University of Singapore
- Occupations: Managing Director of Sin Hwa Dee, CEO and Co Founder of JR groups
- Known for: Launched the world's first Vendcafe in Singapore.
- Spouse: Richard Wong
- Children: 3
- Father: Chng Kee

Jocelyn Chng is a Singaporean businesswoman who is the managing director of Sin Hwa Dee Food Stuff industries Pte Ltd and JR Group.

== Career ==
At the age of 14, she started her own business, pairing private tutors with students to earn a commission. She also sold cosmetics in her free time and stopped only when she started working in Sin Hwa Dee.

When the business was first handed over to her in 1988, it was in debt and competitors were betting that Sin Hwa Dee would collapse in six months’ time. As the managing director of Sin Hwa Dee, she went the extra mile for her customers to prove that they can be trusted.

Working 20 hours a day, she was assisted by her mother and second sister until business slowly stabilised. By the 1990s, business not only stabilised but rapidly expanded into three instead of one factory. In 1992, after attending F&B fair in Paris, she decided that there is potential in the overseas export market. To prepare for their export strategy, they decided to move into a bigger factory to accommodate the increased production.

However, in 1995 serious financial issues arose when the sale of its old factories was delayed and the main contractor for the new building ran away with money for renovation. Pregnant with her first child, Jocelyn had to work long hours pausing only to deliver her child and then returning to work immediately. It was only in 1998 that they started exporting their sauces.

Chng's husband would often help her with the sauce business and accompany her on overseas F&B trade fairs. Through these trade fairs, he saw the potential of ready to eat meals and hot food vending machine. In 2001, together with her husband, Chng started JR Foodstuff.

In 2008, Chng turned her attention to growing JR groups. She explained, “I felt that the time was right because people’s perception of chilled and frozen food had changed. People used to buy freshly slaughtered poultry from the wet market but by then, they knew that chilled and frozen meat sold in supermarkets is safer, fresher.”

In 2016, under Chng's leadership, JR group opened the world's first Vendcafe serving hot meals in Singapore. It is an automatic and unmanned vending machine cafe.

== Community work ==
- 2002, Sponsored President’s Challenge in Soccer Mania.
- 2002, Sponsored Red Pocket Culinary Challenge.

== Personal life ==
In 1997, Chng married Richard Wong. Chng has three sons. In 2004, Chng's husband was diagnosed with lymphoma and he died two weeks afterwards.
