= Jocelynne Rainey =

American nonprofit leader

- Education: Southern Connecticut State University; Metropolitan College of New York; St. John Fisher College
- Organization: Brooklyn Org

Jocelynne Rainey is a nonprofit leader serving as president and chief executive officer of Brooklyn Org.

== Education ==
Rainey received a bachelor's degree from Southern Connecticut State University, and is on the board of the school's foundation. She earned a master’s degree in Public Administration from Metropolitan College of New York and a Doctorate of Education and Executive Leadership from St. John Fisher College. She also earned a Certificate in Non-Profit Executive Leadership from the Business School at Columbia University.

== Career ==
Rainey was president and CEO of Getting Out & Staying Out (GOSO). While at GOSO, Rainey was honored as a Manhattan Hero in City & State for her work supporting GOSO enrollees during COVID-19. Rainey also served as Executive Vice President and Chief Administrative Officer of the Brooklyn Navy Yard Development Corporation (BNYDC).

=== Brooklyn Org ===
In 2021, Rainey was hired to lead Brooklyn Org. Under Rainey's leadership, Brooklyn Org has exceed $130 million in total giving while also expanding commitments to Brooklyn nonprofits focusing on community engagement and racial justice. In 2023, Rainey led a $49,000 rebranding of the Brooklyn Community Foundation, evolving the organization into Brooklyn Org. In April 2025, Rainey joined volunteers during the second annual Brooklyn Org Volunteer Day, a yearly event where Brooklyn Org hosts borough-wide celebrations of community service across Brooklyn.

In 2023, Rainey served on New York City's volunteer Workforce Development Board.

=== Honors ===
In 2026, Metropolitan College of New York awarded Rainey an honorary Doctor of Humane Letters degree.

== Personal life ==
Rainey grew up in Brooklyn, with Jamaican heritage on her father's side.
