= Les Joslin (author) =

American naval officer and author

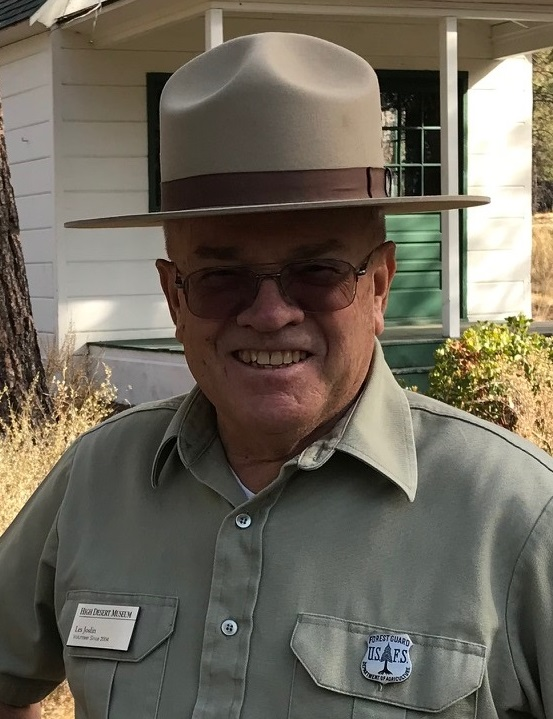
- Joslin at the High Desert Museum in 2018
- Born: April 15, 1943 (age 83); Chelsea, Massachusetts, US
- Education: San Jose State University; University of Colorado; University of London
- Occupations: Military officer and author
- Writing career
- Genre: History
- Subject: United States Forest Service
- Notable works: Toiyabe Patrol; Uncle Sam's Cabins; Legendary Locals of Bend
- Military career
- Allegiance: United States
- Branch: United States Navy
- Service years: 1967–1988
- Rank: Commander

Leslie Allen Joslin (born April 15, 1943) is an American retired naval officer, natural resource manager, educator, and author. After serving 22 years in the United States Navy, Joslin retired in Oregon where he worked for the United States Forest Service. He also taught college courses at Central Oregon Community College and Oregon State University. Joslin has written or edited 11 books, most of them related in some way to the Forest Service or the state of Oregon. He is also a well-known lecturer on forest resources and central Oregon history topics.

== Early life ==
Joslin was born on April 15, 1943, in the United States naval hospital at Chelsea, Massachusetts. His parents were Leslie H. Joslin and Emma (Mogford) Joslin. His father was a career navy officer who served in both World War II and the Korean War. Because of his father's military career, Joslin attended a number of grade schools and then four different high schools in Pennsylvania, North Carolina, and California.

Joslin attended San Jose College, graduating in 1966 with a bachelor's degree in geography and a minor in natural resources conservation. During the summers from 1962 through 1966, he worked for the United States Forest Service as a seasonal firefighter and fire prevention office assigned to the Toiyabe National Forest's Bridgeport Ranger District in eastern California and western Nevada. During his first year on the district, Joslin work from a small one-room office at the Bridgeport ranger station.

== Navy career ==
In 1967, Joslin was commissioned as a United States Navy officer after completing Aviation Officer Candidate School in Pensacola, Florida. Following additional training at Pensacola, the Navy sent him to the military's joint air intelligence officer school at Lowry Air Force Base in Denver, Colorado. After he finished his training in 1968, Joslin was assigned as an air intelligence officer in an A-6 Intruder squadron at Oceana Naval Air Station in Virginia. He was then deployed aboard the USS Saratoga.

In 1970, Joslin married Patricia King. Together, they had two daughters. In addition, Joslin earned two advanced degrees while serving in the Navy. In 1974, he received a Master of Arts in political science from the University of Colorado in Boulder. He was awarded a Master of Philosophy degree in geography from the University of London in 1984.

Joslin served as a navy intelligence officer for 22 years. Over the course of his career, his assignments included an extended tour at sea on the USS Kitty Hawk and multiple shore postings around the world. These included assignments as an intelligence analyst in Washington and an intelligence liaison officer in London. Joslin also served a tour on the faculty of the Defense Intelligence College (now the National Intelligence University) and was an intelligence officer at the Center for Naval Analyses. His duties as an intelligence analyst, especially his three-year tour in Washington, helped him develop a clear and concise writing style. Joslin retired from the navy in 1988 as a commander.

== Post-naval careers ==
After retiring from the Navy, Joslin moved to Sunriver in Central Oregon. In 1989, he began teaching geography courses at Central Oregon Community College. He later taught political science classes there as well. In 2001, he became an adjunct instructor at Oregon State University, teaching a wilderness management course on-line and at Oregon State's central Oregon campus. He left the community college faculty in 2005, but continued teaching at the university through 2011.

In 1990, Joslin resumed working with the Forest Service. He performed seasonal patrols in the Three Sisters Wilderness and worked in public information and education capacities for the Deschutes National Forest for 14 years. He then took a full-time position leading the recreation, heritage, and wilderness resources team for the forest's Bend-Fort Rock Ranger District. Joslin left the Forest Service in 2005.

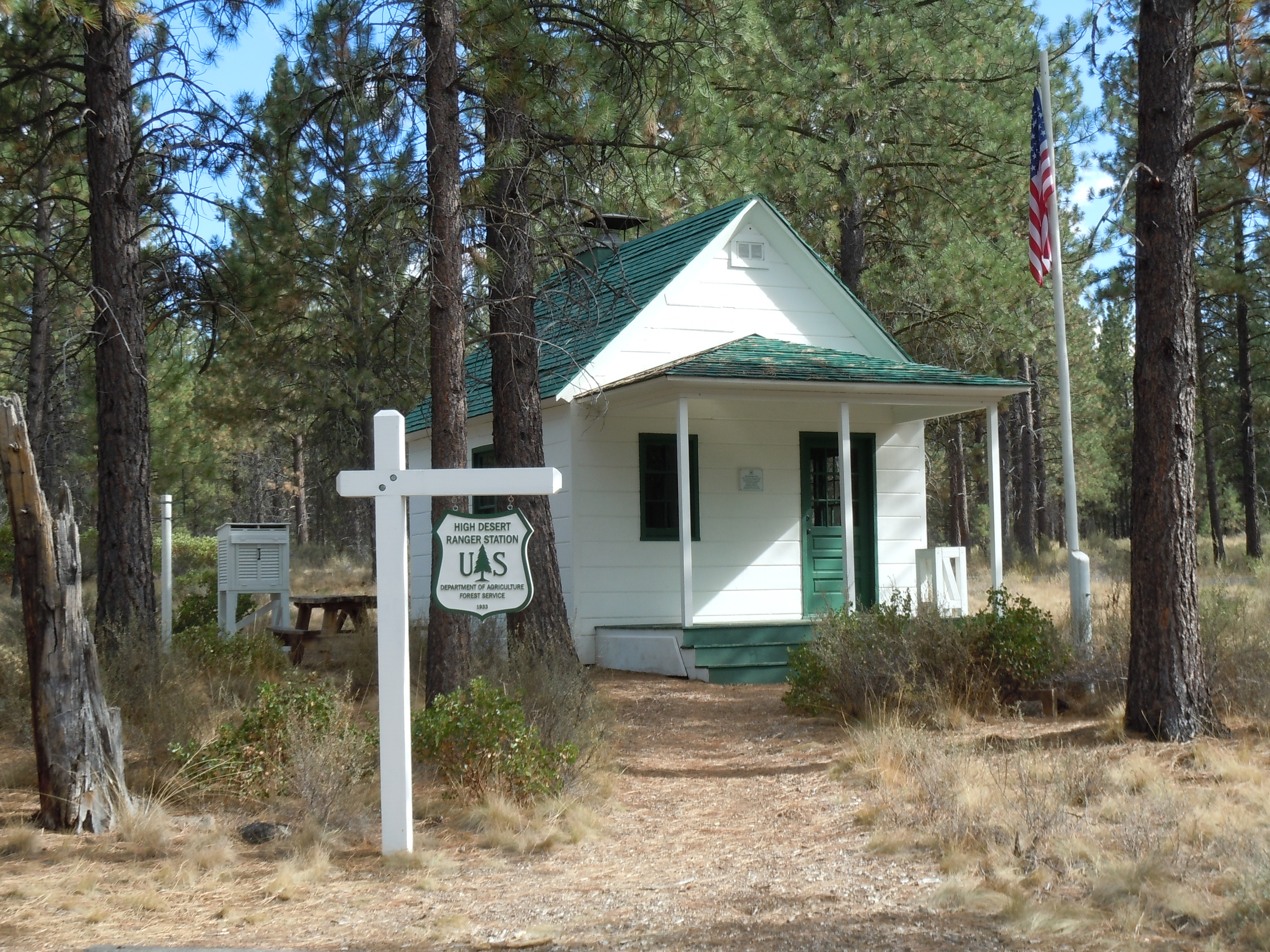
Bridgeport cabin at the High Desert Museum

Working with central Oregon's High Desert Museum, Joslin helped develop a Forest Service centennial exhibit for that museum in 2005. After that project, he worked with the museum to relocate the old one-room Bridgeport ranger station office which had been moved to Nevada and then abandoned by the Forest Service. This was the same ranger's cabin that Joslin worked from in 1962. The cabin was successfully moved to the High Desert Museum in 2008. Once the cabin was relocated, it was restored and opened to the public as a permanent exhibit in 2009. Joslin also helped restore the historic Elk Lake Guard Station located along the Cascade Lakes Scenic Byway in the Deschutes National Forest. The guard station now serves as a Forest Service visitor center and interpretive site.

After Joslin retired from teaching and the Forest Service, he focused on writing and volunteer work. He is a fellow of the High Desert Museum and has served as president of the Deschutes County Historical Society's board of directors. He has also written six articles for The Oregon Encyclopedia. In 2017, Joslin joined the board of directors for the Waterston Desert Writing Prize, an annual literary prize that recognizes excellent non-fiction writing that highlights aspects of the high desert environment. That same year, the Oregon Cultural Trust and the Deschutes Cultural Coalition recognized Joslin with the Ben Westlund Memorial Award for his work highlighting and preserving Oregon's forest resources. In 2018, Joslin completed 13 years as editor of the quarterly Old Smokeys Newsletter published by the Pacific Northwest Forest Service Association.

Today, Joslin lives with his wife in Bend, Oregon. From his home base in Bend, Joslin continues to write and remains a well-known lecturer on forest resources and local history topics.

== Author ==
As of 2018, Joslin has written or edited eleven books, almost all of them about Oregon or the Forest Service. His two most recent books, plus one other, were published by Arcadia Publishing. His autobiography was published by Xlibris Publishing. In addition, one book was published by the United States Forest Service. The rest of his books were published by Wilderness Associates, a small specialty publishing house located in Bend, Oregon.

Joslin's first book, Toiyabe Patrol: Five U.S. Forest Service Summers, was initially published in 1993. It is the story of Joslin's summers work as a Forest Service firefighter and fire prevention officer in the Toiyabe National Forest. He later revised and retitled the book. The revised edition was published in 2006 under the title Toiyabe Patrol: Five U.S. Forest Service Summers of the High Sierra in the 1960s. Joslin's second book was published in 1995. Uncle Sam's Cabins: A Visitor's Guide to Historic U.S. Forest Service Ranger Stations of the West, combines Forest Service history with architectural details about seventy-five ranger stations located across twelve western United States. A revised version of the book was published in 2012. In 1999, Joslin published his third book. It told the story of Walt Perry, an early-era forest ranger who served in Oregon and New Mexico.

Joslin's next four books explored various aspects of forestry and forest history. The Wilderness Concept and the Three Sisters Wilderness: Deschutes and Willamette National Forests, Oregon was published in 2000. A revised edition was published in 2005. Seventeen Summers at Paulina Lake Guard Station was published in 2006. It was co-authored with Dick and Dave Robins. The following year, Ponderosa Promise: A History of U.S. Forest Service Research in Central Oregon was published by the Forest Service's Pacific Northwest Research Station. Ponderosa Promise traces the history of forest research east of the Cascade Mountains in Oregon and Washington from 1897 through the founding of the Forest Service's modern silviculture laboratory and experimental forest in the mid-1990s. In 2008, Joslin prepared a new edition of a 1936 book by John Riis called Ranger Trails: The Life And Times of a Pioneer U.S. Forest Service Ranger in the West on the La Sal, Santa Barbara, Cache, and Deschutes National Forests, 1907–1913.

Bend: 100 Years of History was written by a Deschutes County Historical Society committee and published in 2005. In 2009, Joslin revised the book and it was republished under the title Images of America: Bend. The revised version retained the historical society authorship. Five years later, Joslin published an autobiography, titled Life & Duty: An American Adventure. That book records Joslin's life story including his early life, naval career, and subsequent pursuits. Joslin's next book was Legendary Locals of Bend, published in 2016. Legendary Locals highlights remarkable people associated in some way with Bend, Oregon. The book includes 120 short biographies including stories about fur trapper Peter Skene Ogden, explorer John Charles Fremont, Bend's founder Alexander M. Drake, publisher George Palmer Putnam, Olympic gold medalist Ashton Eaton, and many other interesting people. In 2017, Joslin published a book about the Deschutes National Forest. His book Deschutes National Forest documents the history of one of eastern Oregon's largest national forests.

Here is a list of books Joslin has written or edited as of 2018:

- Toiyabe Patrol: Five U.S. Forest Service Summers; Wilderness Association (1993), ISBN 9780964716704; in 2006, the book was expanded and retitled, Toiyabe Patrol: Five U.S. Forest Service Summers of the High Sierra in the 1960s, ISBN 9780964716759; a third edition with an expanded epilogue was privately published in 2018
- Uncle Sam's Cabins: A Visitor's Guide to Historic U.S. Forest Service Ranger Stations of the West; Wilderness Associates (1995), ISBN 9780964716711; a revised version was published in 2012
- Walt Perry: An Early-Day Forest Ranger in New Mexico and Oregon; Wilderness Associates (1999), ISBN 9780964716728
- The Wilderness Concept and the Three Sisters Wilderness: Deschutes and Willamette National Forests, Oregon; Wilderness Associates (2000); a revised edition was published in 2005, ISBN 9780964716742
- Seventeen Summers at Paulina Lake Guard Station; co-authored with Dick Robins and Dave Robins, Wilderness Associates (2006), ISBN 9780964716766
- Ponderosa Promise: A History of U.S. Forest Service Research in Central Oregon; United States Department of Agriculture, United States Forest Service, Pacific Northwest Research Station (2007), Government Document Number: A 13.88:PNW-GTR-711
- Ranger Trails: The Life and Times of a Pioneer U.S. Forest Service Ranger in the West on the La Sal, Santa Barbara, Cache, and Deschutes National Forests, 1907–1913; reprint of a 1936 book by John Riis with prologue and epilogue added, Wilderness Associates (2008), ISBN 9780964716773
- Images of America: Bend; revised edition of a 2005 book titled Bend: 100 Years of History authored by Deschutes County Historical Society, Arcadia Publishing (2009), ISBN 9780738571843
- Life and Duty: An American Adventure; Xlibris Publishing, (2014), ISBN 9781499007732
- Legendary Locals of Bend; Arcadia Publishing (2016), ISBN 9781467102278
- Deschutes National Forest; Arcadia Publishing (2017), ISBN 9781467124669
