= Gervais II of Château-du-Loir =

French lord (1030–1095)

Gervais II (c. 1030 – c. 1095) was the lord of Château-du-Loir. In 1067, Gervais II succeeded his uncle, Gervais de Château-du-Loir. Gervais II had a daughter, named Matilda, who married Elias I, Count of Maine in 1090.
