= Rorgon I of Maine =

French count (died c. 840)

Rorgon I or Rorico(n) I (also Rorgo or Rorich; died 16 June 839 or 840) was the first count of Maine and progenitor of the Rorgonid dynasty, which is named for him. He was count of Rennes from 819 and of Maine from 832 until his death.

== Life ==
He was a son of lord Gauzlin I of Maine and Adeltrude, both of whom are named as his parents in a charter of 839 by Rorgon I to the Abbey of Saint-Maur de Glanfeuil. Between 819 and 832 Rorgon became count of Maine and at some point, possibly at the bidding of his wife Bilechilde who may have owned the property, undertook to restore the Abbey of Glanfeuil. An Abbot Ingelbert of Saint-Maur-des-Fossés allegedly assisted Rorgon and sent monks including Rorgon's brother Gausbert. (Note: At this point the remaining details become somewhat uncertain due to being obtained from several forged charters to this institution. For more information see: Herbert Bloch, Monte Cassino, Vol. I (Parts I and II) (1986), p. 970.) Gausbert (Gauzbert) was the name of an Abbot at St. Maur.

Count Rorgon had been a retainer at the court of Charlemagne, with whose daughter Rotrude he had a sexual relationship. The couple had at least one illegitimate child, Louis, Abbot of Saint-Denis, Saint-Riquier, and Saint-Wandrille, who was also chancellor to his cousin Charles the Bald from 841.

Rorgon became the second count of Maine in 832 when his predecessor Banzleibs was made margrave of the Saxons. He remained count of Maine until his death in 840, at which time he was succeeded by his brother Gauzbert. His own son, Rorgon II, succeeded Gauzbert in 853 and upon his death in 865 his other son Gauzfrid became count.

== Marriage and issue ==
Rorgon married a lady named Bilechilde, and had three sons and two daughters:

- Rorgon II of Maine
- Gauzfrid of Neustria
- Gauzlin, Bishop of Paris
- Bilechilde, who married Bernard II, Count of Poitiers
- Adaltrude, who married Ranulf I of Aquitaine

Rorgon and Rotrude had one illegitimate son—Louis, Abbot of Saint-Denis, Saint-Riquier, and Saint-Wandrille, and Chancellor to King Charles the Bald.

== Sources ==
- McKitterick, Rosamond (2008). Charlemagne: The Formation of a European Identity. Cambridge University Press.
- Riché, Pierre. Les Carolingiens, une famille qui fit l'Europe. 1983.
- Volkmann, Jean-Charles. Bien Connaître les généalogies des rois de France. ISBN 2-87747-208-6
