= Gauzfrid of Maine =

French count (died 878)

Gauzfrid of Maine (died 878) was both Count of Maine and Margrave of the Norman March from 865 until his death. He was a son of Rorgon of Maine by his wife Bilechilde.

In 861, Charles the Bald, king of West Francia, created the March of Neustria, combining the Norman March and the Breton March. They were invested to Adalard the Seneschal and Robert the Strong, respectively. Gauzfrid and his brother Rorgon II, who was Count of Maine at the time, revolted against Robert. The two brothers allied with Salomon of Brittany in opposition to Robert the Strong.

In 865, Rorgon II died and Gauzfrid became the new Count of Maine. The same year, Charles the Bald deprived Adalard's family of their land in Neustria, and awarded it to Gauzfrid.

He had several children.

- Gauzlin II (died 914), Count of Maine
- Gauzbert (fl. 912)

Upon his death in 878, Gauzfrid's lands passed to his cousin Ragenold, because Gauzfrid's children were too young to succeed.
