= Château-du-Loir =

- Part of Montval-sur-Loir
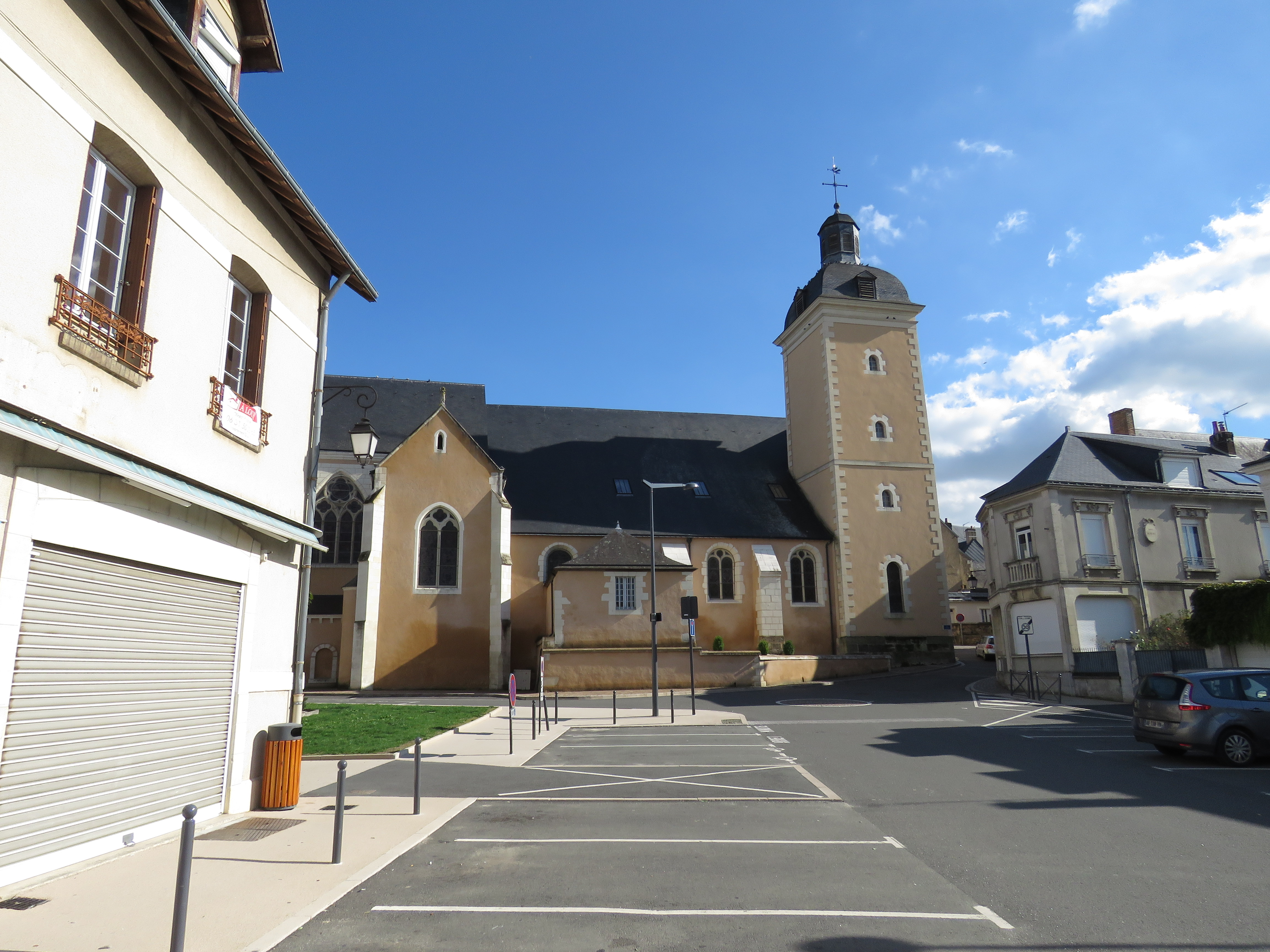
- The church of Saint-Guingalois
- Location of Château-du-Loir
- Location within France Location within Pays de la Loire
- Coordinates: 47°41′54″N 0°25′06″E
- Country: France
- Region: Pays de la Loire
- Department: Sarthe
- Arrondissement: La Flèche
- Canton: Montval-sur-Loir
- Commune: Montval-sur-Loir
- Area^{1}: 11.46 km^{2} (4.42 sq mi)
- Elevation: 101 m (331 ft)
- Highest elevation: 131 m (430 ft)
- Lowest elevation: 44 m (144 ft)
- Population (2022): 4,265
  - Density: 372.2/km^{2} (963.9/sq mi)
- Time zone: UTC+01:00 (CET)
  - Summer (DST): UTC+02:00 (CEST)
- Postal code: 72500
- Website: www.ville-chateauduloir.fr
- ^{1} French Land Register data, which excludes lakes, ponds, glaciers > 1 km^{2} (0.386 sq mi or 247 acres) and river estuaries.

Château-du-Loir (French pronunciation: [ʃɑto dy lwaʁ]; literally 'Château of the Loir') is a former commune in the Sarthe department in the region of Pays de la Loire in north-western France. On 1 October 2016, it was merged into the new commune Montval-sur-Loir. Château-du-Loir station has rail connections to Tours and Le Mans.

== Notable people ==
- Gervais II, lord of Château-du-Loir
- Cécile Didier (1888–1975), stage and film actress
- Guillaume des Roches (1165 - 1222), lord of Longué-Jumelles and Château-du-Loir, comrade in arms of Philippe Auguste
- Saint Siméon-François Berneux (1814 - 1866), one of the Korean Martyrs
- Pierre Loutrel (1916 - 1946), bandit

== See also ==
- Communes of the Sarthe department
