= Hugh IV of Maine =

11th-century Norman noble

Hugh IV, Count of Maine
- Died: 25 March 1051
- Noble family: Hugonide; Carolingian
- Spouse: Bertha of Blois
- Issue Detail: Herbert II, Count of Maine
- Father: Herbert I, Count of Maine

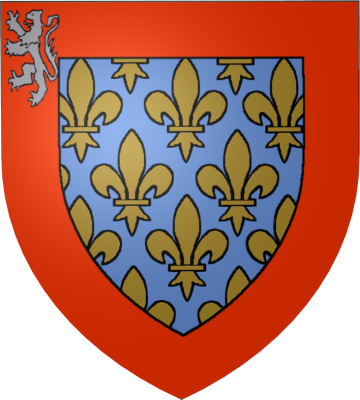
Maine coat of arms

Hugh IV (died 25 March 1051) was Count of Maine from 1036 to 1051.

Hugh was the son of Count Herbert I of Maine, one of the Hugonides. (Note: The Hugonides were descended from Count Roger († c. 890 and were so named for counts Hugh I, II, III, and IV, and were also descended from the Carolingians through Roger's wife Rothild, a daughter of Charles the Bald. See: K.S.B. Keats-Rohan, 'Two Studies in Northern French Prosopography', Journal of Medieval History 20 (1994) 3-37.) He was a minor on the death of his father (1036) so was born between 1018 and 1022. Herbert Baco, his great-uncle and a supporter of the Angevins, acted as regent.

The bishop of Le Mans, Gervais de Château-du-Loir, was a partisan of the opposing Blois family. The bishop and regent clashed, with the outcome being the expulsion of Herbert by means of a popular council. Gervais then proclaimed Hugh to have reached his majority, and arranged a marriage for him, with Berthe of Blois.

Herbert, unlike his predecessors, followed the advice of his bishop. Gervais, unlike his uncle who he succeeded, Avesgaud de Bellême (who was an adherent of the counts of Anjou) was allied to the counts of Blois. Hugh, no doubt in support of his bishop, engaged in a number of wars with Count Geoffrey Martel of Anjou in the Loir valley. Shortly after Hugh's death, 26 March 1051, Gervais sought refuge in Normandy after being driven out of Maine. Gervais' success in strengthening the Bishopric of Le Mans served to downgrade the countship of Maine, which led to the county being absorbed into the domains of Anjou and Normandy.

== Family ==
Hugh married c. 1046 Bertha of Blois, who was the widow of Alan III, Duke of Brittany, and daughter of Odo II, Count of Blois and Ermengarde of Auvergne.

Their children were:

- Herbert II, Count of Maine († 1062).
- Marguerite (c. 1045 † 1063), betrothed to Robert Curthose.

== Sources ==
- Douglas, David Charles (1966). William the Conqueror. University of California Press.
- Evergates, Theodore, ed. (1999). Aristocratic Women in Medieval France. University of Pennsylvania Press.

Preceded by Herbert I	Count of Maine; 1036–1051	Succeeded by Herbert II
