= Ragenold of Neustria =

Margrave of Neustria

Ragenold (or Raino) (killed 25 July 885) was the Count of Herbauges from 852 and Count of Maine and Margrave of Neustria (positioned against the Vikings) from 878. His family is unidentified, but he may have been a son of Reginald of Herbauges.

In 878, on the death of Gauzfrid, Charles the Bald conferred the Neustrian march and the county of Maine on Ragenold, because Gauzfrid's children were too young to succeed. On 25 July 885, the Vikings pillaged Rouen. Ragenold came up and surprised the Viking raiders, but was killed in the ensuing action.

== Sources ==
- Guillotel, Hubert. "Une autre marche de Neustrie." in Christian Settipani and Katharine S. B. Keats-Rohan, Onomastique et Parenté dans l'Occident médiéval. 2000.
