= Counts and dukes of Maine =

French title of nobility

This is a list of counts and dukes of the province of Maine prior to its annexation by France to the royal domain in the thirteenth century.

== Dukes of Maine (duces Cenomannici) ==
- Charivius (fl. 723) – appears as dux in a document of 723. Controlled twelve counties and the Diocese of Le Mans
- Grifo (748–749) – given the twelve counties of Maine by his brother, Pepin the Short, as appeasement, but rebelled the next year.
- Charles the Younger (790–811) – given the ducatus Cenomannicus to govern by his father, Charlemagne.
- Lothair I (817–831) – given the ducatus as part of a division of the realm by his father, Louis the Pious.
- Pepin I (831–838) – given the ducatus as part of a re-division of the realm by his father, Louis the Pious.
- Charles the Bald (838–851) – given the ducatus on the death of Pepin by their father, Louis the Pious.
- Robert the Strong (851/3–856) – given Maine, Anjou, and Touraine as dux and missus dominicus. Rebelled in 856.
- Louis the Stammerer (856–858) – granted the twelve counties and a court at Le Mans by his father, Charles the Bald, until chased away by Breton rebels.

== Counts of Maine ==
- Banzleibs (fl. 830s)
- Rorgon I (832–839)
- Gauzbert (839–849)
- Rorgon II (849–865)
- Gauzfrid (865–878)
- Reginald (878–885)
- Roger (886–893)
- Gauzlin II (893–895)
- Roger (restored) (895–900)
- Hugh I (900–950)
- Hugh II (950–992)
- Hugh III (992–1015)
- Herbert I Wakedog (1015–1032)
- Hugh IV (1036–1051)
- under Angevin rule (1051–1063)
  - Herbert II (1058–1062)
- Walter of Mantes (1062–1063)
  - Robert Curthose (1063–1069)
- Hugh V (1069–1093)
- Elias I (1093–1110)
- Eremburga and Fulk (1110–1126)
- Geoffrey (1126–1151)
- Elias II (1151)
- Henry II of England (1151–1189)
  - Henry the Young King (1169–1183)
- Richard the Lionheart (1189–1199)
- John Lackland (1199–1204)
  - Arthur I, Duke of Brittany pretender (1199–1203)
- annexed by France in 1204
- John Tristan (1219–1232)
- Charles I (1246–1285)
- Charles II (1285–1290)
- Charles III (1290–1314)
  - Margaret (1290–1299)
- Philip VI of France (1314–1328)
- royal domain in 1328
- John II of France (1332–1350)
- royal domain in 1350 to 1356
- Louis I (1356–1360)
- Louis II (1384–1417)
- Louis III (1417–1434)
- Charles IV (1434–1472)
- Charles V (1480–1481)
- royal domain
- Charles VI (?–1611)
- Henry (1611–1621)
- Charles VII (1621–1631)
- Ferdinand (1631–1632)
- Charles VIII (1632–?)
- royal domain

== Dukes of Maine (ducs du Maine) ==
In 1673, the title began to be used again. It was revived by Louis XIV for his first illegitimate son by his chief mistress, Françoise-Athénaïs, marquise de Montespan. He used it until his death and also founded the semi-royal house of Bourbon du Maine, named after his title.

- Louis Auguste, Duke of Maine (1673–1736)
