= Bruère Mill =

French watermill

- Moulin de la Bruère
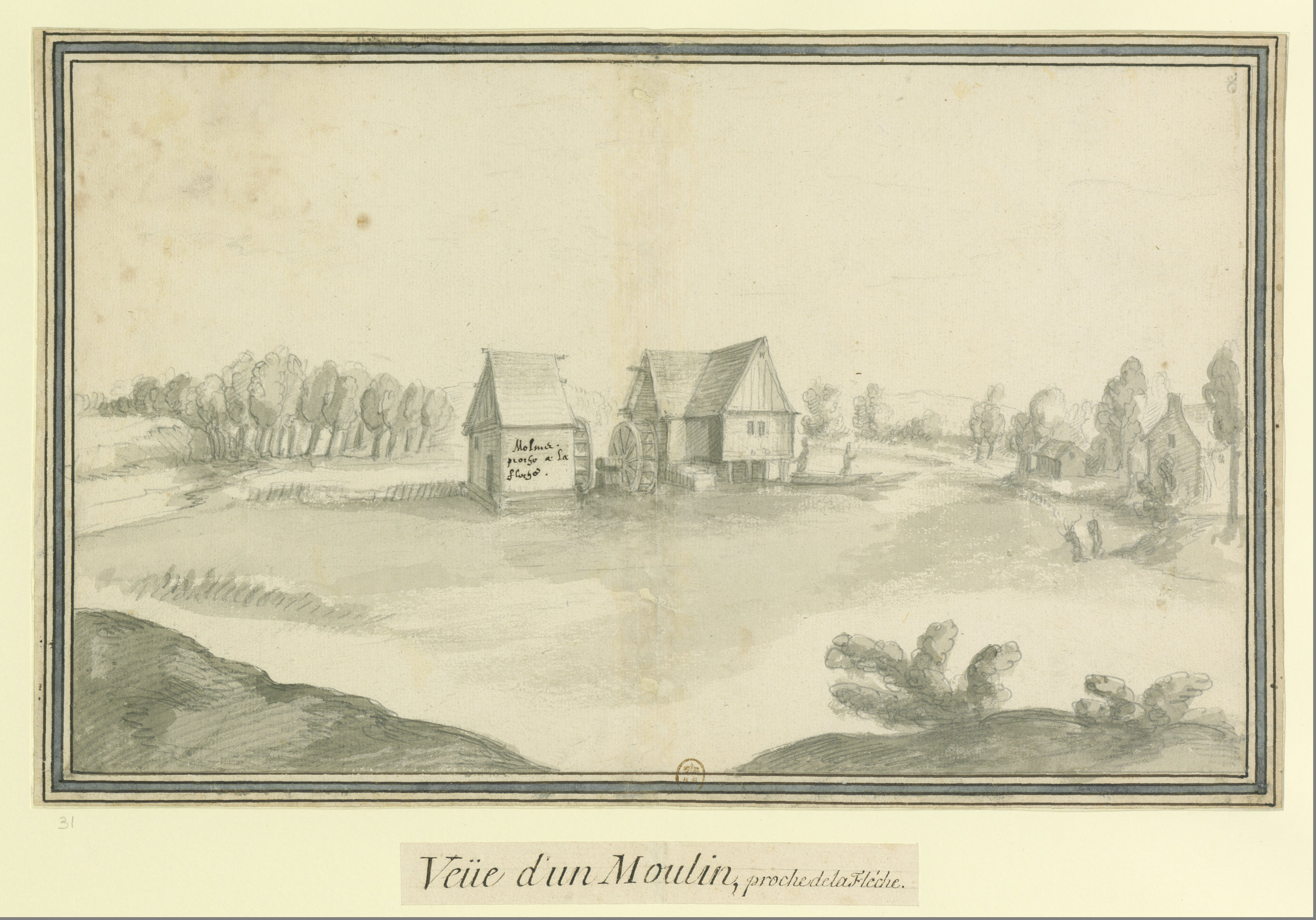
- Drawing by Étienne Martellange depicting the Moulin de la Bruère in 1612
- Interactive map of Bruère Mill
- Location: La Flèche, Sarthe, Pays de la Loire, France
- Coordinates: 47°41′25″N 0°03′11″W
- Beginning date: 14th century
- Owner: City of La Flèche

The Moulin de la Bruère is a historic watermill on the Loir near La Flèche in the Sarthe department of France. Established as early as the 14th century, it was preserved by the municipality in 1994 and is maintained by the "Friends of the Moulin de la Bruère" association. It is notable as the last mill in France, and reportedly in Europe, to produce ice blocks for cooling purposes using hydraulic power.

== History ==
The origins of the Moulin de la Bruère trace back to 1096, when Hubert des Pouliers, lord of Sainte-Colombe, a parish near La Flèche, permitted monks to build a watermill and lock on the Loir. The current mill's foundations date to the 14th century. In 1614, Guillaume Fouquet de la Varenne, lord of La Flèche, acquired the mill. By the early 19th century, three mills operated at the site, which were sold as national properties in 1813 during the post-Revolutionary period. Two mills, located on an island, were abandoned in the early 20th century, while the riverside mill was preserved.

The mill ceased operations in 1992 after its last manager left. In 1994, the municipality of La Flèche purchased the mill, and in 1995, the "Friends of the Moulin de la Bruère" association assumed responsibility for its maintenance and operation. The association has since restored the mill, modernized its hydroelectric capabilities, and opened it for public visits, preserving its historical and cultural significance.

=== Production ===
The mills at the Bruère site have historically served multiple functions. Initially designed for grinding wheat and rye flour, they later processed hemp and clover, fulled cloth, sawed wood, pressed oil, and ground tanbark for leather tanning in the 1860s. In 1832, one building was converted into a paper mill. By the early 20th century, as industrial flour mills outcompeted traditional watermills, the riverside Moulin de la Bruère shifted to producing animal feed and ice blocks.

The ice production facility, installed in 1929 and operational by 1936, marked a significant shift. It used hydraulic power to produce 10 tons of ice daily, primarily for cooling before domestic refrigerators became widespread. After a period of dormancy, ice production resumed in 1999 following restoration in 1998. Today, the mill produces approximately 6–8 tons of ice annually, sold in 20-kg blocks for €6 or as crushed ice for €6.50, primarily during the summer months. The mill's ice production, driven by its waterwheel, is a unique feature, distinguishing it as the only such mill in metropolitan France.

Since 2020, the mill has been 100% self-sufficient in electricity, thanks to a modernized hydroelectric system with a new metallic waterwheel installed in March 2020. It supplies power to La Flèche and sells surplus electricity to EDF, France's national electricity provider. This sustainable energy production aligns with France's growing interest in renewable energy from historic watermills.

== Description ==
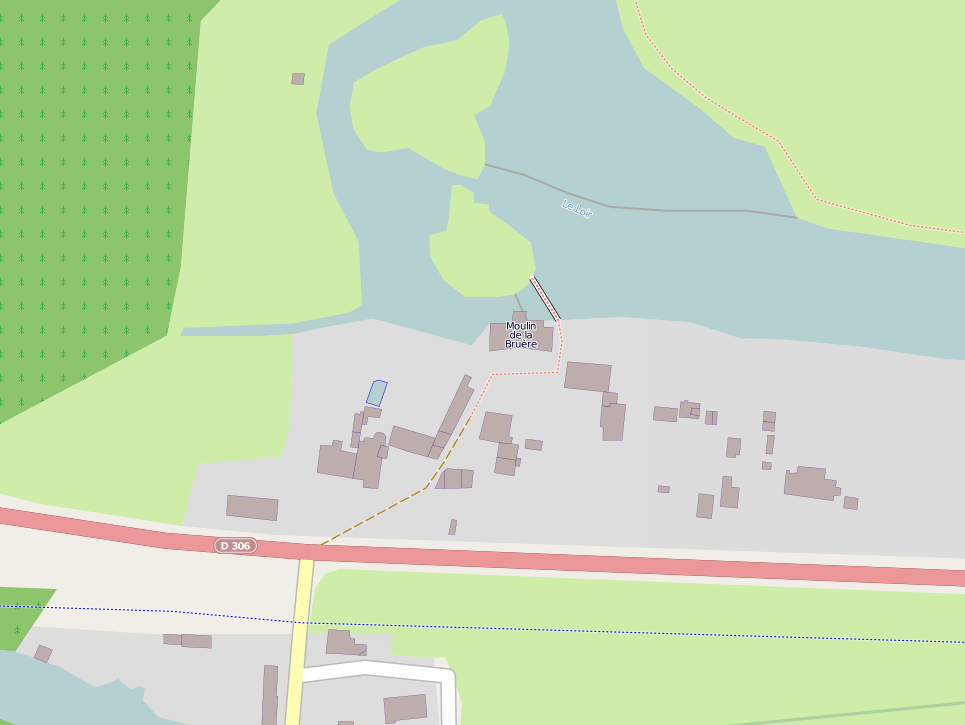
Map showing the surroundings of the Moulin de la Bruère.

The Moulin de la Bruère is situated on the left bank of the Loir, southeast of La Flèche. A 120-meter-long dam across the river creates an 80-centimeter waterfall that powers the waterwheel. The wheel, made of oak and metal, measures 6 meters in diameter, 4 meters in width, and weighs 15 tons. A 28-horsepower Ruston diesel engine serves as a backup during floods or maintenance. The mill's ice workshop, operational since 1936, uses tin trays ("mouleaux") filled with potable water submerged in a tank of non-freezing liquid cooled to −12 °C, producing 20-kg ice blocks. Restoration in 1998 enabled the resumption of ice production, with volunteers producing around 90 blocks per batch, stored in a cold room for weekly sales.

The milling workshop contains two horizontal millstones: a stationary "dormant" stone and a rotating "running" stone, used for producing coarse flour and animal feed. Two dynamos once powered the mill's lighting and the miller's residence. The mill's hydroelectric system, modernized in 2020, now generates electricity for both its operations and the local grid.

== Significance ==
The Moulin de la Bruère is a rare example of a working watermill that combines historical industrial practices with modern sustainability. Its ice production, unique in France, attracts visitors and researchers interested in the history of the ice trade and renewable energy in France. The mill hosts guided tours from April to October, organized by the association, and sells ice blocks every Saturday during the summer, preserving a tradition that predates modern refrigeration. The association also organizes cultural events, such as the annual "Saints de Glace" veillée, featuring performances and community engagement.

== See also ==
- La Flèche
- Watermill
- Loir
- Sarthe (department)
- Pays de la Loire
- Guillaume Fouquet de la Varenne
- History of paper mills
- Ice trade
- Renewable energy in France
- Biens nationaux
