= Guillaume Fouquet de la Varenne =

French chef and statesman (1560–1616)

Fouquet in or after 1607, detail of Henry IV of France with his family and Guillaume Fouquet de La Varenne

Guillaume Fouquet de la Varenne (French: [ɡijom fukɛ]; 1560 in La Flèche – 7 December 1616) was a French chef who became an important statesman in the service of Henry IV.

== Biography ==
Guillaume Fouquet was born into a bourgeois family in La Flèche (France, Loire valley). His father, Martin Fouquet, was master chef ("écuyer de cuisine") to Françoise d'Alençon, Duchess of Vendôme. Martin Fouquet served three generations of the family; following the duchess' death, he served her son, Antoine de Bourbon (1518–1562), husband of Jeanne III of Navarre (Jeanne d'Albret), and later their young son Henry of Navarre, the future Henry IV of France.

In 1578, at the age of 18, and with help from his father, Guillaume became a cook in the service of Catherine de Bourbon (1559–1604), sister of the future king. Impressed by the young man's personality and skill, in 1580 Catherine recommended him to her brother, and he subsequently became a portmanteau at the court of Henry IV.

For thirty years, until the King's assassination in 1610, Fouquet lived in the shadow of Henry IV, but nevertheless took an active part in important events of the realm. Confirming his reputation for skill and bravery and in spite of near-certain personal risk, he devoted himself completely to the causes of the king.

At the age of twenty he took part in the assault against the stronghold of Angoulême held by the League and captured the lieutenant of the city. In 1587 he distinguished himself at the battle of Coutras. He fought against the Leaguers of the Duke of Mayenne at the battle of Arques (1589) and the battle of Ivry (1590), scoring victories that opened access to Paris for the future monarch of France. Henry, who abjured his Protestant faith in 1593 and was crowned in Chartres in 1594, entrusted Fouquet with public diplomatic missions as well as confidential matters.

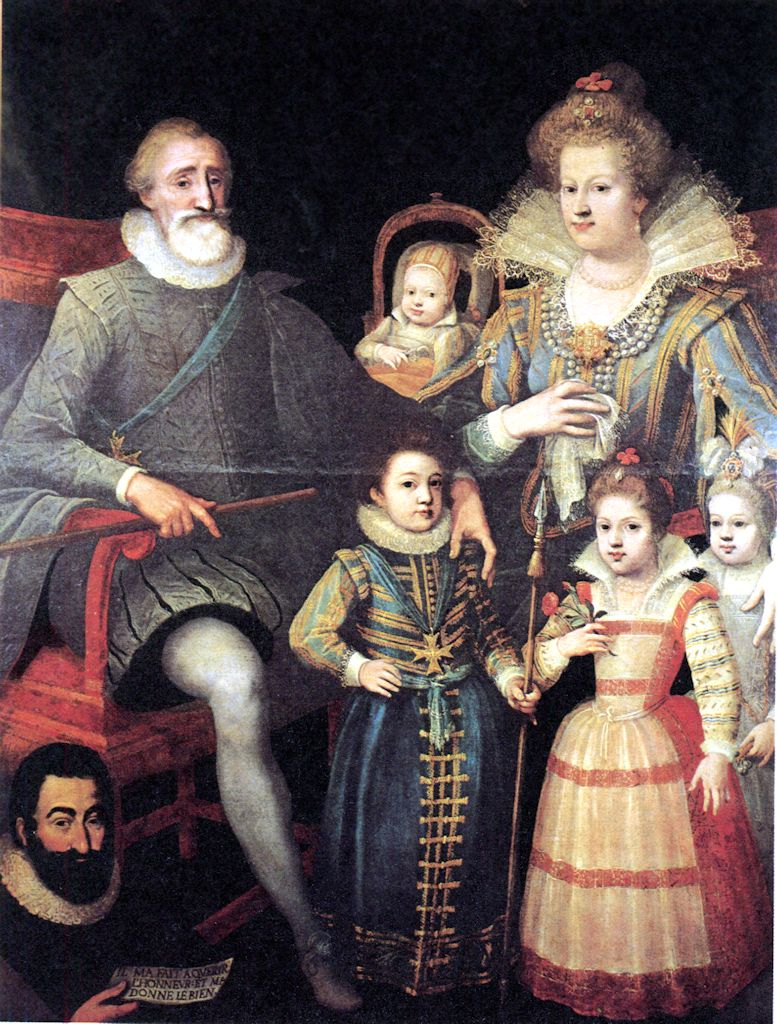
Henry IV and the royal family. Below left, Fouquet de la Varenne. Attributed to Frans Pourbus the Younger Fouquet is holding a paper on which is written: "He made me to acquire honor and gave me kindness".

In early June 1595, Fouquet saved Henry's life at the Battle of Fontaine-Française. He was appointed as Commissary of War, and later as Comptroller General of Posts, replacing Hugues Du Mas, a member of the House of Guise. He re-organized the postal network and in 1598 contributed to the creation of the modern French public postal services by opening up the royal postal service to the public, in commemoration of which a stamp bearing his likeness was issued by the French Post Office in 1946.

The King's sister, Catherine de Bourbon, Duchess of Bar and wife of Henry II, Duke of Lorraine, once said to Fouquet, whom she had known as a cook: "It seems, la Varenne, that you have earned more by carrying my brother's chickens (i.e.: his messages) than by skewering mine."

A close friendship united the king and his favorite since the first battle against the Leaguers on the battlefields of Ivry and Fontaine-Française. "Dear heart, La Varenne has found me in bed again," wrote Henry IV to Marie de Medici in 1606. On the other hand, Henry's relations with Maximilien de Béthune, Duke of Sully were not as trusting. Sully disliked the king and denounced his vain ambition. Fouquet's influence, however, increased up until the final years of Henry's reign.

During his career, Fouquet also served as a counselor to the Parliament of Paris, Master of the Requests of the King (State Councillor), Governor of the town and castle of La Flèche (1592), Governor of the town and castle of Angers (28 August 1604), and later Lieutenant General of the province of Anjou (1613). Fouquet also donated to the ecclesiastical abbeys of Ainay (near Lyon), Saint-Benoit-sur-Loire, Saint-Nicolas d'Angers, Saint-Loup de Troyes, and the Esvière priory near Angers.

His first marriage to Catherine Foussard, who died in 1605, brought him the lands of La Varenne as her dowry. Guillaume Fouquet had several sons. He was knighted in 1598 and carried the title of Baron of Sainte-Suzanne, and later, in 1616, he was made Marquis de Sainte-Suzanne and La Flèche.

The land attached to Saint-Romans in Poitou had previously been elevated into a barony for Fouquet and his second wife, Jeanne de Poix, citing "services rendered by them in acts wars, or in several other ways".

== Bibliography ==
- Baron Sébastien de la Bouillerie : généalogie de Fouquet de la Varenne in Les annales fléchoises et Revue historique et archéologique du Maine, 1905–1906
- Dr Pierre Schilte, Le château des Fouquet de la Varenne à La Flèche au XVIIe siècle, Imprimerie Martin, Le Mans
- Mme Jean de Montgascon descendante de la famille de La Varenne.
- Travaux de Pierre Schilte (La Flèche) et Gérard Morteveille (Sainte-Suzanne), 1987–1988.
- Marquis de Beauchêne in "Sainte-Suzanne, son histoire et ses fortifications" de Robert Triger, Sté Historique et archéologique du Maine, Le Mans 1907, réédité en 1996 par l'Association des Amis de Sainte-Suzanne, Editions régionales de l'Ouest, Mayenne, préface de Gérard Morteveille. ISBN 2-85554-077-1
- "Sainte-Suzanne (Mayenne), cité médiévale, Mille ans d'Histoire", de Gérard et Jean-Pierre Morteveille, Musée de l'auditoire, Sainte-Suzanne, 1988.
- "Le patrimoine des communes de la Mayenne", p. 894, Flohic Editions, Paris, 2002. ISBN 2-84234-135-X
