= Collège Henri-IV =

Jesuit educational institution

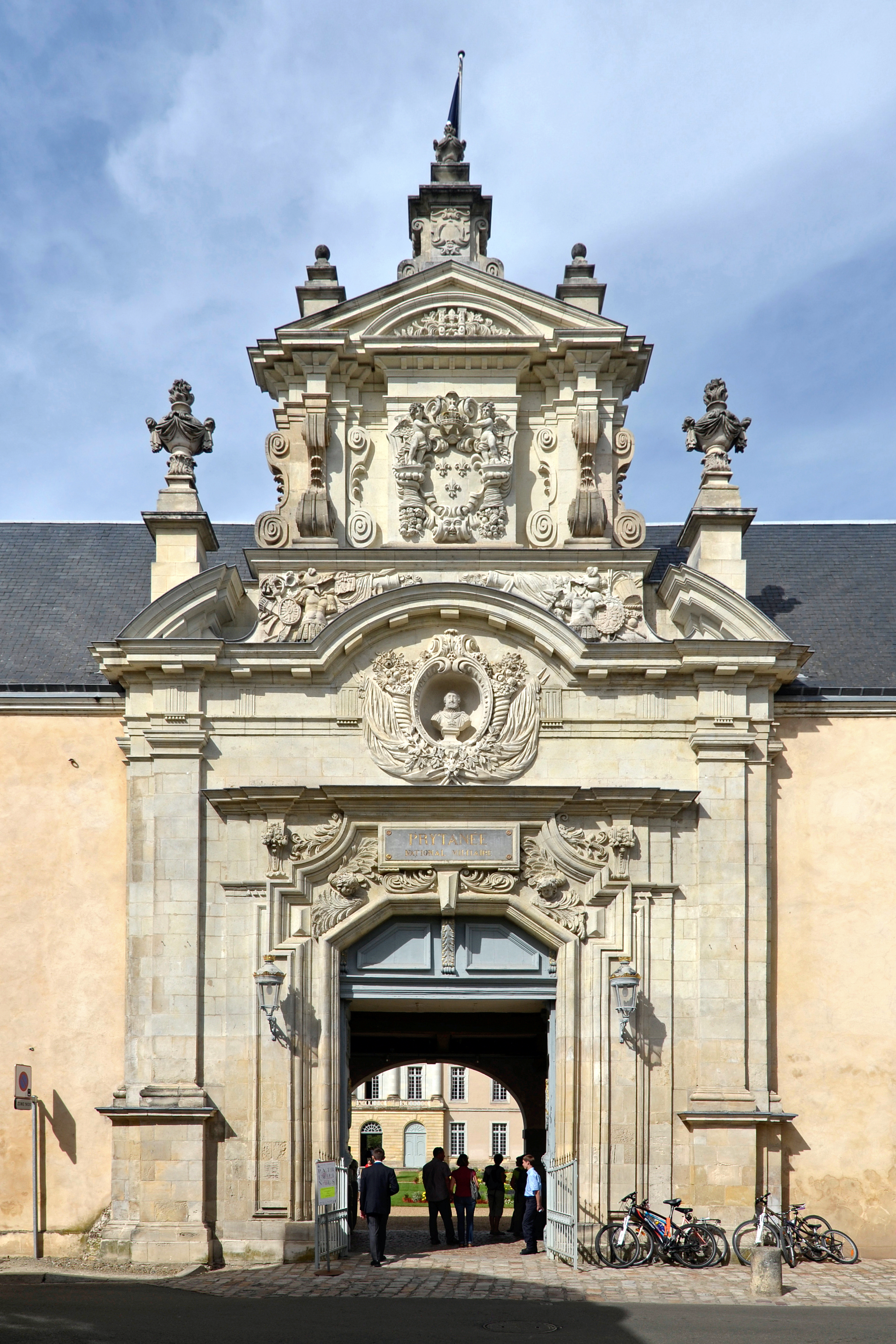
- Affiliations: Jesuit
- Location: La Flèche, France

The Collège Henri-IV (also known as the Collège royal Henri le Grand or the Jesuit College of La Flèche) was a Jesuit educational institution located in La Flèche, in the department of Sarthe, France. Founded in 1603 by Henri IV, shortly after the king had recalled the Society of Jesus to France, the college prospered, quickly reaching over 1,000 students who followed the curriculum defined in the Ratio Studiorum. Some of them went on to become famous, such as the philosophers René Descartes and David Hume. The college was the first boarding school opened by the Jesuits.

After the expulsion of the Jesuits from France in 1762, the college buildings were used by a succession of institutions. In 1808, Napoleon I finally decided to establish the Prytanée National Militaire, which has since become one of France's six defense lycées.

== History ==
=== Françoise d'Alençon's "Château-Neuf" ===
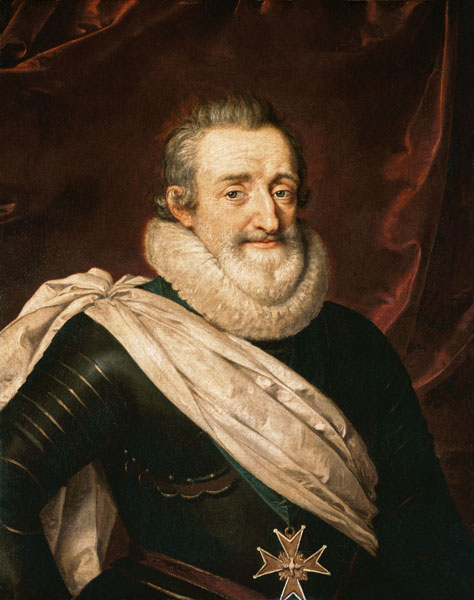
Henri IV, founder of the Collège Henri-IV.

The Angevin seigneury of La Flèche has belonged to the House of Alençon since the 15th century. Widowed in 1537, Françoise d'Alençon decided to retire to her seigneury of La Flèche, which she had received in dower from her husband Charles de Bourbon. Unable to live in the town's old feudal château, now the Château des Carmes, deemed too dilapidated and lacking in comfort, she decided to build a new residence, the "Château-Neuf". Located outside the city walls, on the site of today's Prytanée Militaire, the château was built to plans by architect Jean Delespine between 1539 and 1541.

On the death of the Duchess of Alençon, her son Antoine de Bourbon inherited her possessions. Antoine de Bourbon and his wife Jeanne d'Albret, heir to the kingdom of Navarre, stayed at their Château-Neuf in La Flèche on several occasions, in the company of their son, the future King Henri IV.

=== Recall of the Jesuits and foundation of the Collège de La Flèche ===
Guillaume Fouquet de la Varenne entered Henri IV's service in 1580 as a portmanteau. He became one of the king's most loyal advisors and was appointed to several posts, including Governor of La Flèche and Comptroller General of the Post Office. After equipping the town with a granary and a presidial court, Fouquet de la Varenne decided to found a college there, a project which King Henri IV was in favor of, but did not accelerate.

In 1603, during Henri IV's trip to Metz, Fouquet de la Varenne introduced him to the Jesuit fathers of Verdun, who were eager to ask the king to recall them. On September 3, 1603, by letters patent sent from Rouen, Henri IV authorized the return to France of the Jesuits, who had been banished by the Paris parliament in 1594 after the failed attempt on the king's life by one of their former students, Jean Châtel. The king granted the Jesuits permission to re-occupy the places where they had been established before their departure, as well as to establish themselves in other towns to found colleges, "and particularly to lodge in our house at La Flèche in Anjou". Without waiting for the edict to be verified by Parliament, Henri IV instructed Father Pierre Coton to take the necessary steps to open the college at La Flèche as soon as possible. The king's plan was not only to establish a college there but to create a full-fledged university with a novitiate attached. On the advice of Father Claudio Acquaviva, Superior General of the Jesuits, the teaching of law and medicine were eventually withdrawn, as was the establishment of a novitiate, since an establishment of this type already existed at the Jesuit college in Rouen.

The first Jesuit fathers, led by Pierre Barny, appointed rector of the college, arrived in La Flèche in early November 1603. As the château was not yet equipped to receive them, the Jesuits initially lodged in the house of Fouquet de la Varenne. Classes, taught by three professors from the Collège de Pont-à-Mousson, began in early January 1604. From the very first year, the college was a great success, with almost a thousand students. Enrolment grew steadily over the following years, reaching a peak of 1,800 students in 1626.

In May 1607, Henri IV signed the Edict of Fontainebleau, which marked the creation of the Collège de La Flèche. With this edict, he laid down the educational program for the establishment, which he wanted to turn into a "general and universal seminary ". He donated his "Château-Neuf" to the Jesuits, granting them 300,000 livres for the construction of the establishment, as well as an annual income of 20,000 pounds, drawn from the revenues of several abbeys or priories near La Flèche, such as Luché. The king also promised to build the college's church, and to bequeath his heart to it after his death, along with that of Queen Marie de Médicis.

=== Building work and the death of Henri IV ===
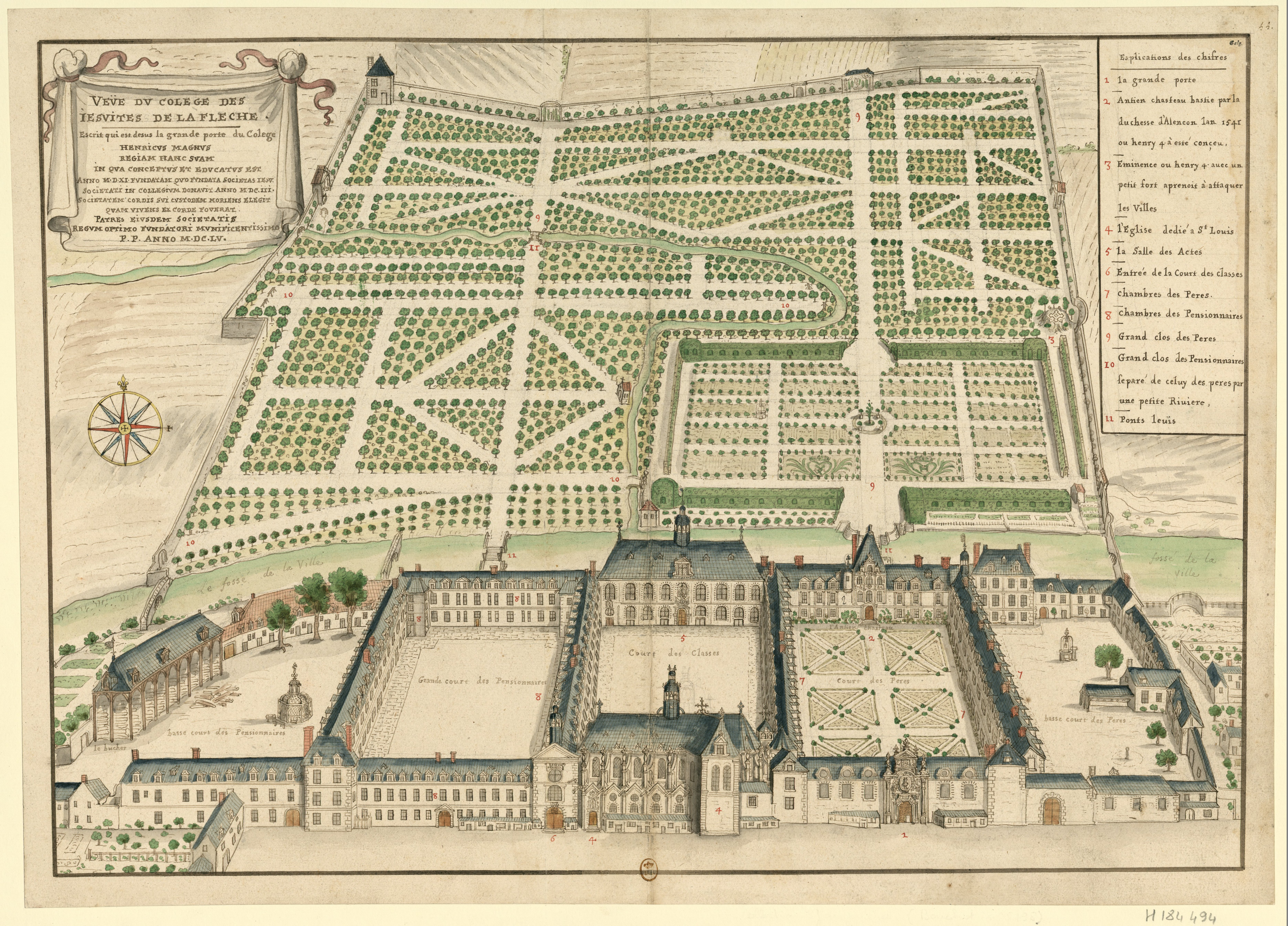
Collège Henri-IV in 1695.

Plans for the college were drawn up as soon as the first Jesuits arrived in 1604. Henri IV wanted to entrust responsibility for the project to Brother Étienne Martellange, but the provincial of Lyon, on whom the architect depended, objected to this collaboration. The plans were then drawn up by the king's architect, Louis Métezeau. Jacques le Féron de Longuemézière was awarded the contract in August 1606, and construction began the following year. The first stone of the church was laid in the crypt on June 18, 1607, in the name of the King by Jean de Beaumanoir, marshal of Lavardin, and blessed by the parish priest of Saint-Thomas de La Flèche.

The college was built on a grid plan, with five courtyards symbolizing the different functions of the establishment. In the center, the "cour des classes" is delimited by the chapel and the "salle des actes", whose hipped roofs, rising clearly above the mass of the rest of the building, mark its importance. To the east, the "cour des pères", or "cour royale", opens onto the Château-Neuf, where the monks are housed, while to the west, the "cour des pensionnaires" provides accommodation for boarding students. At either end, the "fathers' bailey" and "boarders' bailey" are reserved for the college's domestic functions. As the new building extended far beyond the original boundaries of the Château-Neuf, the Jesuits gradually acquired the surrounding houses to complete the construction work.

The day after Henri IV's assassination, Guillaume Fouquet de la Varenne reminded Queen Marie de Médicis of the king's promise to bequeath his heart to the college. The deceased's heart was then entrusted to the Jesuits and taken to La Flèche, where the procession entered on the morning of June 4, 1610, led by the Duc de Montbazon. A ceremony was held in the church of Saint-Thomas before the heart was transferred to the college.

=== The college from the 17th to the 18th century ===
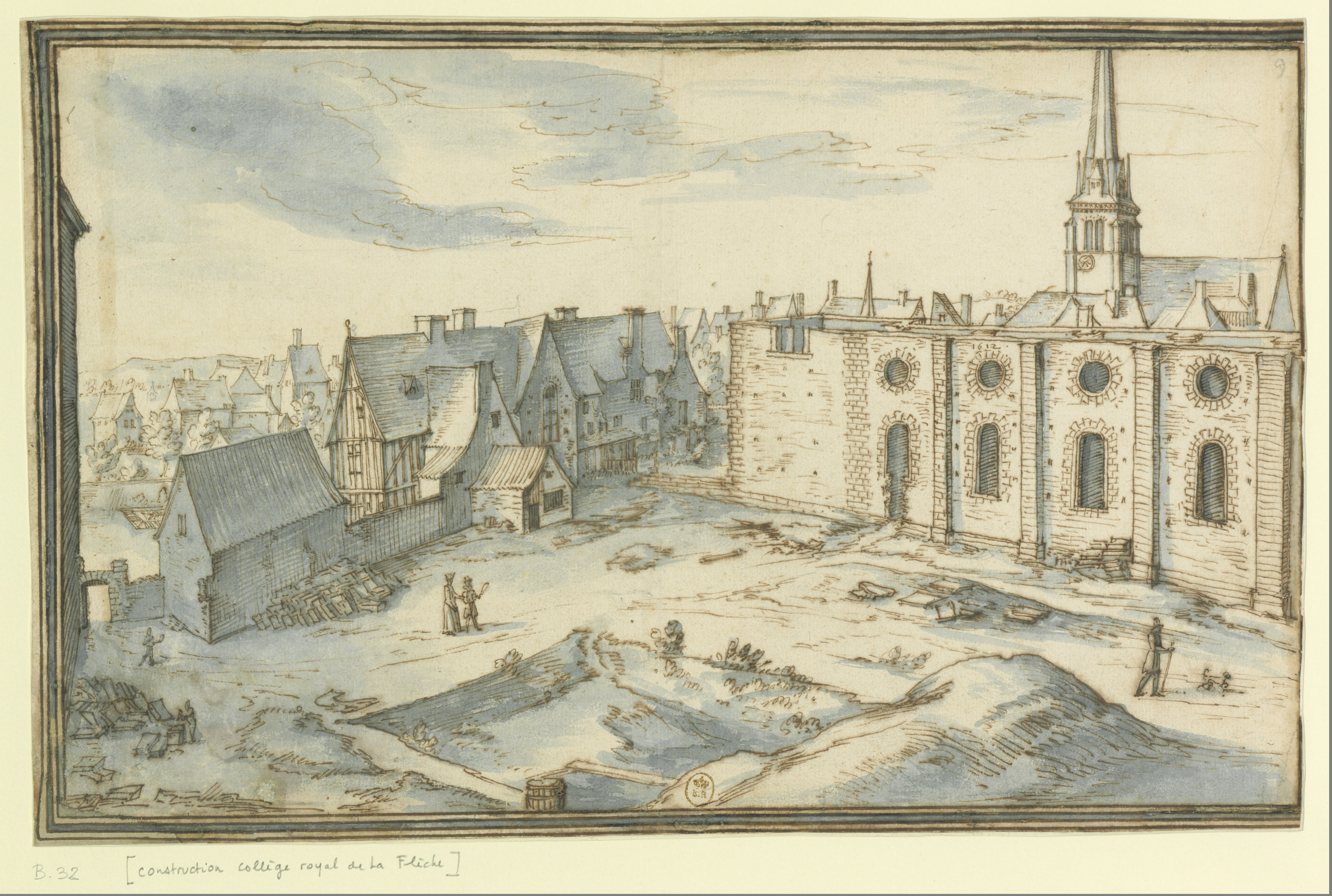
Drawing by Étienne Martellange, showing the progress of work on the college's Saint-Louis chapel in 1612.

In 1611, contractor Jacques le Féron de Longuemézière went bankrupt, was discharged from the works and the construction site was mothballed. The following year, Father Étienne Martellange was sent to La Flèche by Marie de Médicis. On his arrival, he wrote a manuscript entitled "Mémoires de quelques fautes plus remarquables faites aux bâtiments du collège royal de La Flèche", in which he made a number of criticisms of the work already carried out. Martellange stayed in La Flèche for a year, then returned in 1614 to oversee the completion of the church, the expenses for which were paid from the royal treasury. With construction already well underway, Martellange was only able to make partial modifications.

In 1616, Guillaume Fouquet de la Varenne died. He was buried in the chapel, below the heart of Henri IV, in accordance with his wishes.

The shell of the Saint-Louis chapel, the body of the "salle des actes" and the east wing of the "cour des classes" were the first buildings to be completed in 1621. The development of the "cour des pères" began in 1629 with the demolition of the outbuildings of the "Château-Neuf", and ended in 1653 with the erection of the southern body of the courtyard, opening onto the city through the "portail royal". In the chapel, opened for worship in 1622 to mark the canonization of Saint Ignatius and Saint Francis Xavier, then consecrated in 1637 under the name of Saint-Louis by the bishop of Angers, work continued on the altarpiece by Laval artist Pierre Corbineau between 1633 and 1636, followed by the installation of the organ loft between 1637 and 1640.

Relations between the Jesuits and the lords of La Flèche became strained on several occasions in the course of the 17th century. Starting in 1630, a dispute arose between the fathers and René, second Marquis de la Varenne, over René's claim to the right to fish in the Collège's moat and his refusal to pay the Jesuits the 12,000 livres left to them by his father Guillaume in his will. Faced with the Jesuits' intransigence, René and his gentlemen took up arms, closing the Collège for several days. After four years of legal wrangling, the conflict was settled by the payment of a thousand écus by the Jesuits to the Marquis, thus putting an end to an episode that had come to be known as the "Frog War".

On April 12, 1643, in accordance with Henri IV's wishes, the heart of Marie de Médicis was transferred to La Flèche to join that of her former husband in the church of Saint-Louis. In 1648, two niches were dug on either side of the choir, in the upper part of the transept arms, to house the cenotaphs containing the royal hearts.

Pupil numbers gradually declined from the end of the 17th century onwards, and by 1761 the college had just 550 students, as the number of schools in the region multiplied.

=== After the departure of the Jesuits: from the École des Cadets to the Prytanée Militaire ===
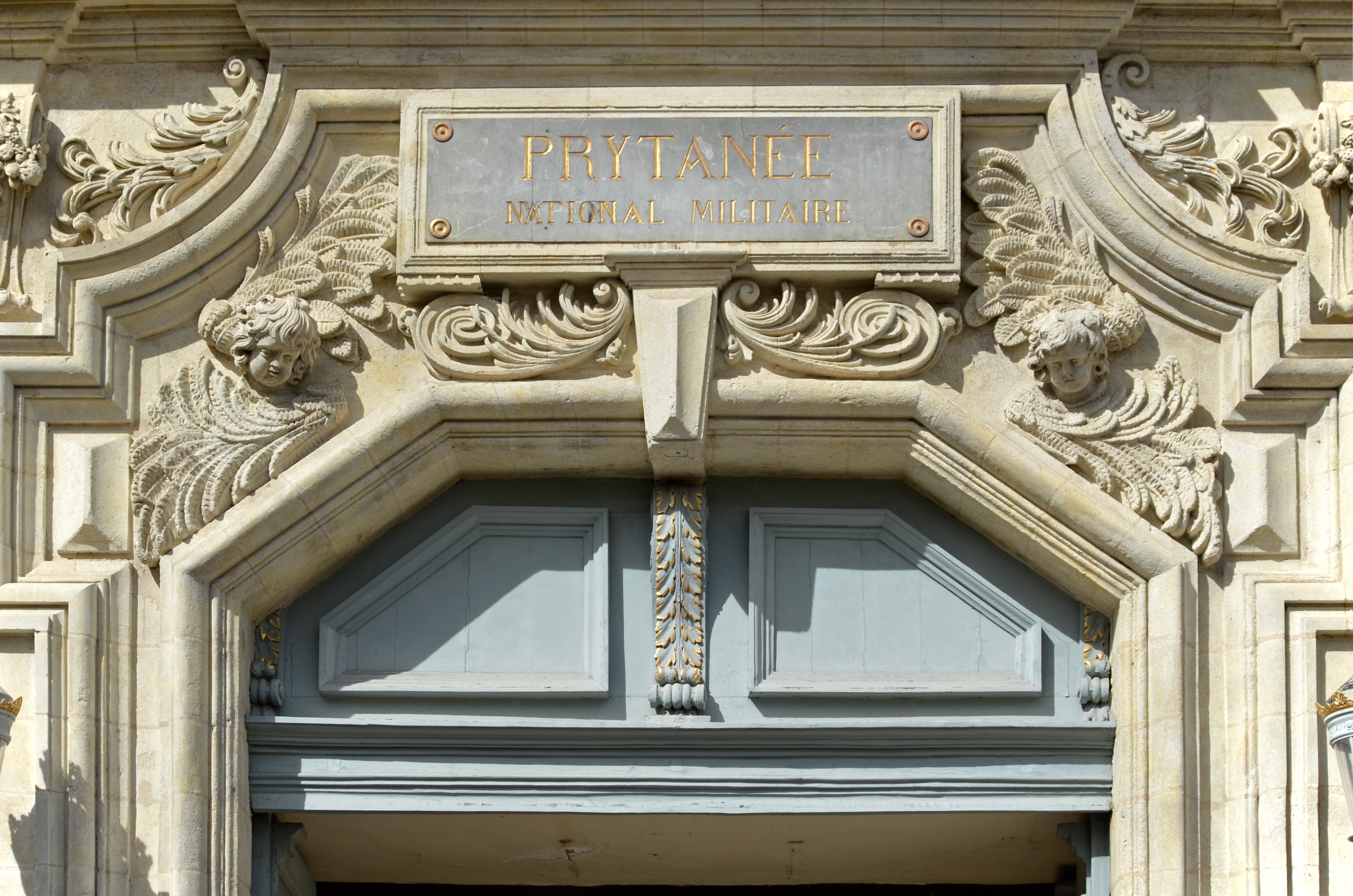
The Prytanée inscription on the portal of honor.

On August 6, 1761, a ruling by the Parliament of Paris ordered the closure of Jesuit schools. The Society of Jesus was banished from the kingdom, the fathers were secularized and their property sold. At the beginning of April 1762, the Jesuits left the college and the town of La Flèche. Appointed to fill the vacancies left by the departure of the Jesuits, the municipal administration called on former students of the school to continue classes. For two years, the college was run by Abbé Donjon, a former philosophy teacher.

In April 1764, the Duc de Choiseul transformed the college into the "École de Cadets", also known as the "École Militaire Préparatoire", designed to train students, the most deserving of whom would be sent to the École Militaire in Paris.

In 1776, Claude-Louis de Saint-Germain, Minister of War, dispersed the students to small provincial military schools. A few months later, King Louis XVI sent letters patent re-establishing the college. Henceforth, the college was entrusted to the Doctrinaires, who carried out various renovations until the Revolution.

In 1793, a law abolished the colleges: the Doctrinaires were expelled, the students dismissed, and the material assets were sold as national property. At the same time, Conventionnel representative Didier Thirion had the urns containing the hearts of Henri IV and Marie de Médicis opened and burned in the public square. A surgeon, Doctor Charles Boucher, recovered some of the ashes, which were returned by his descendants in 1814. During the French Revolution, the college buildings were put to a variety of uses, including military hospital, headquarters of the municipal administration and the district of La Flèche, and workshops. From 1797, two former teachers from the college tried to maintain a small "additional central school" in part of the buildings.

The municipality, wishing to recover its school, approached Emperor Napoleon I, who responded favorably to the request. In 1808, the Prytanée militaire was transferred from Saint-Cyr to La Flèche. A few months later, 300 students destined for a career in arms were admitted to the new establishment. Today, the Prytanée national militaire is one of six lycées de la défense.

== The curriculum ==
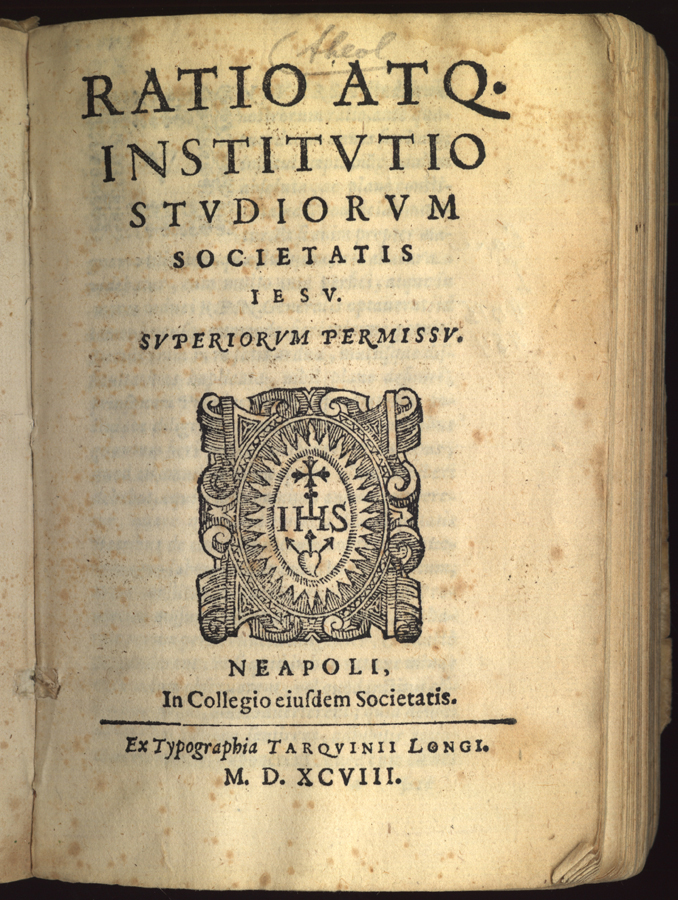
Ratio Studiorum.

Studies at the Collège de La Flèche followed the principles of the Ratio Studiorum, the Jesuit education charter promulgated in 1599. Three years of grammar, three years of humanities, and three years of philosophy. Classes were divided into thirteen levels: six devoted to Latin and Greek literature, three to philosophy and four to theology. Classes are taught in Latin or Greek, not French. As in all other Jesuit establishments, tuition is free for all. The Collège de La Flèche welcomes both boarders, housed in the "boarders' courtyard", and day students, who find their lodgings in the town's houses.

There were many Jesuits: 83 in 1611 and up to 110 in the mid-17th century. Before closing in 1762, the establishment had 88 fathers, including 34 teachers. The Collège de La Flèche gradually became the most important Jesuit college after the Collège de Clermont in Paris, and exchanges of professors between the two establishments were quite frequent. Michel Le Tellier, confessor to Louis XIV, and Georges Fournier, author of a treatise on hydrography, were among the most eminent professors to have taught at La Flèche, prompting the philosopher René Descartes, a boarder from 1607 to 1615, to write, "I was in one of the most famous schools in Europe".

== Religious and missionary influence ==
With its 100 Jesuits and 1,000 students, the college's influence quickly spread to La Flèche, a town with just over 5,000 inhabitants at the beginning of the 18th century. The college's religious influence led to the establishment of several other convents in the town, for which the Jesuits sometimes provided confessors or instructors, earning the town the nickname "Sainte-Flèche".

The intellectual center of Fléch also had a strong missionary influence, mainly in the American colonies. Jérôme Lalemant, evangelizer of the Hurons, was appointed rector of the college between 1656 and 1659. Pierre-François-Xavier de Charlevoix died in La Flèche while writing his Histoire de la Nouvelle-France, while François de Montmorency-Laval, the first bishop of Quebec, was a student at the college for several years. Joachim Bouvet and Jean de Fontaney, mathematicians who had entered the service of the Kangxi emperor and retired to La Flèche after a tour of China, also attended the college.

This influence fueled the students' enthusiasm for the new countries and led to further missionary vocations. A student at the college between 1608 and 1617, Jérôme le Royer de la Dauversière, from Fléch, was fascinated by the accounts of the fathers who had returned from New France, such as those of Énemond Massé. This teaching was a determining factor for the man who, from 1630 onwards, devoted his life to the creation of the Compagnie des Cent-Associés, which founded Ville-Marie, now Montreal.

From 1651, the missions of South America and the West Indies were directly attached to La Flèche, to be governed by the rector of the college.

== Notable people ==
=== College management ===
- Jérôme Lalemant, missionary evangelizer of the Hurons, rector of the college between 1656 and 1659.
- Jean Chastelier, rector of the college until 1630.
- Jean Bagot, theologian.
- Joseph de Jouvancy, professor of rhetoric.
- Jacques Longueval, professor of grammar and humanities.
- Étienne Noël, Catholic theologian and grammarian.
- Énemond Massé, missionary in Acadia.
- Joachim Bouvet, mathematician and missionary in China, in the service of Emperor Kangxi.
- Jean de Fontaney, missionary mathematician in China.
- Georges Fournier, geographer, hydrographer and mathematician.
- Pierre-François-Xavier de Charlevoix, missionary historian in Canada.
- Michel Le Tellier, confessor to Louis XIV.
- Antoine Girard, writer and translator.
- Jean-Baptiste Gresset, poet and playwright.
- Thomas Gouye, astronomer and linguist.
- Hyacinthe Robillard d'Avrigny, historian.
- François-Joseph Desbillons, fabulist and poet.
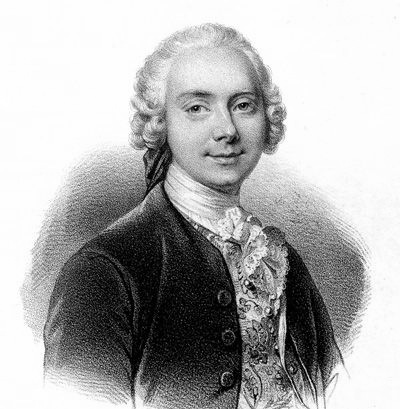
Jean-Baptiste Gresset.

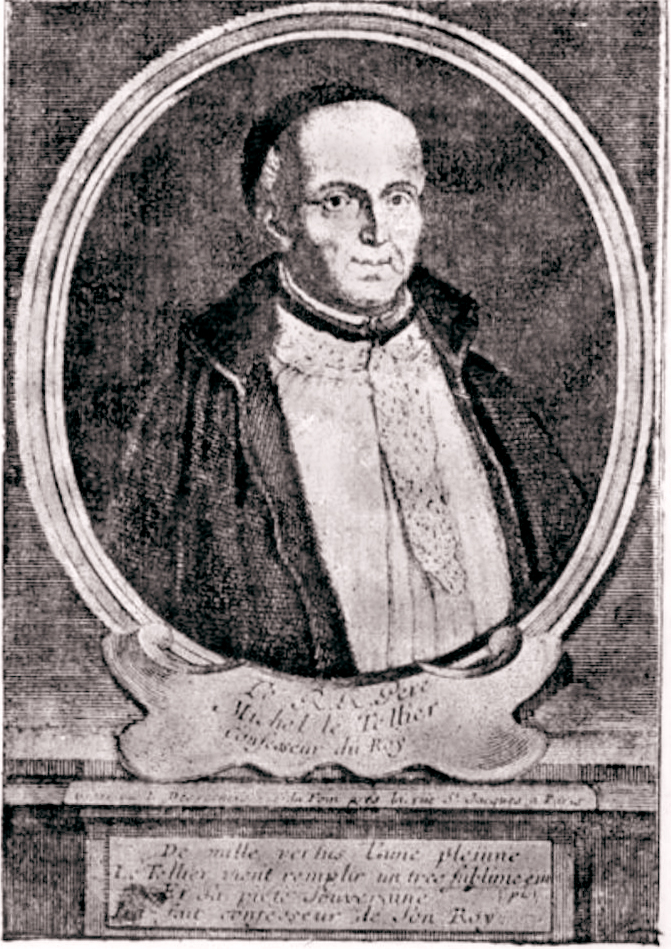
Michel Le Tellier.

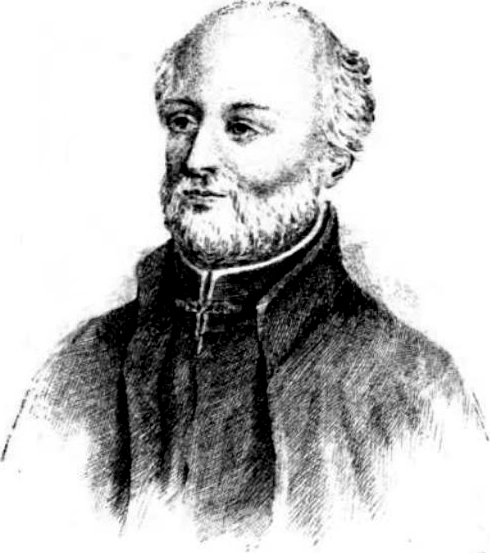
Pierre-François-Xavier de Charlevoy.

=== Alumni ===
- René Descartes, philosopher, author of Discourse on the Method.
- Jérôme le Royer de la Dauversière, founder of the congregation of the Religious Hospitallers of Saint Joseph and history of Montreal, now known as Montreal.
- Charles de Schomberg, marshal and peer of France.
- Pierre Séguier, magistrate under Louis XIV.
- Marin Mersenne, scholar, mathematician and author of the first laws on acoustics.
- Joseph Sauveur, musicologist.
- Pierre de Marbeuf, poet.
- Julien Maunoir, missionary and preacher in the Breton countryside.
- Jacques Vallée Des Barreaux, libertine and epicurean poet.
- Jean Picard, astronomer and geodesist, the first to accurately calculate the Earth's radius.
- Jean-Baptiste Budes de Guébriant, Marshal of France.
- Louis de Nogaret, archbishop of Toulouse and lieutenant-general of the king's armies.
- François Louis Rousselet de Châteaurenault, naval officer, Marshal of France.
- Abbé Prévost, novelist, historian and churchman.
- François de Montmorency-Laval, first bishop of Québec.
- Pierre Cholonec, missionary, administrator of the First Nations of Canada.
- Louis François Henri de Menon, Marquis de Turbilly, agronomist.
- Jacques Fitz-James de Berwick, son of Jacques II Stuart and Marshal of France.
- Jean-Charles de Borda, physicist, mathematician, political scientist and navigator.
- Alexandre-Angélique de Talleyrand-Périgord, cardinal, archbishop of Paris and deputy to the Estates-General of 1789.
- Charles François d'Aviau du Bois de Sanzay, archbishop of Bordeaux and Vienne.
- Jacques Ruël, theologian.
- Claude-Emmanuel Lhuillier, poet.
- Louis Henri de Pardaillan de Gondrin, archbishop of Sens.
- Gabriel Calloet-Kerbrat, agronomist.
- Jean Dussaulx, disciple of Jean-Jacques Rousseau.
- David Hume, philosopher, author of A Treatise of Human Nature.
- François René Charles Treton de Vaujuas (1761-1788), student from 1771 to 1775. Naval officer, member of La Pérouse expedition.
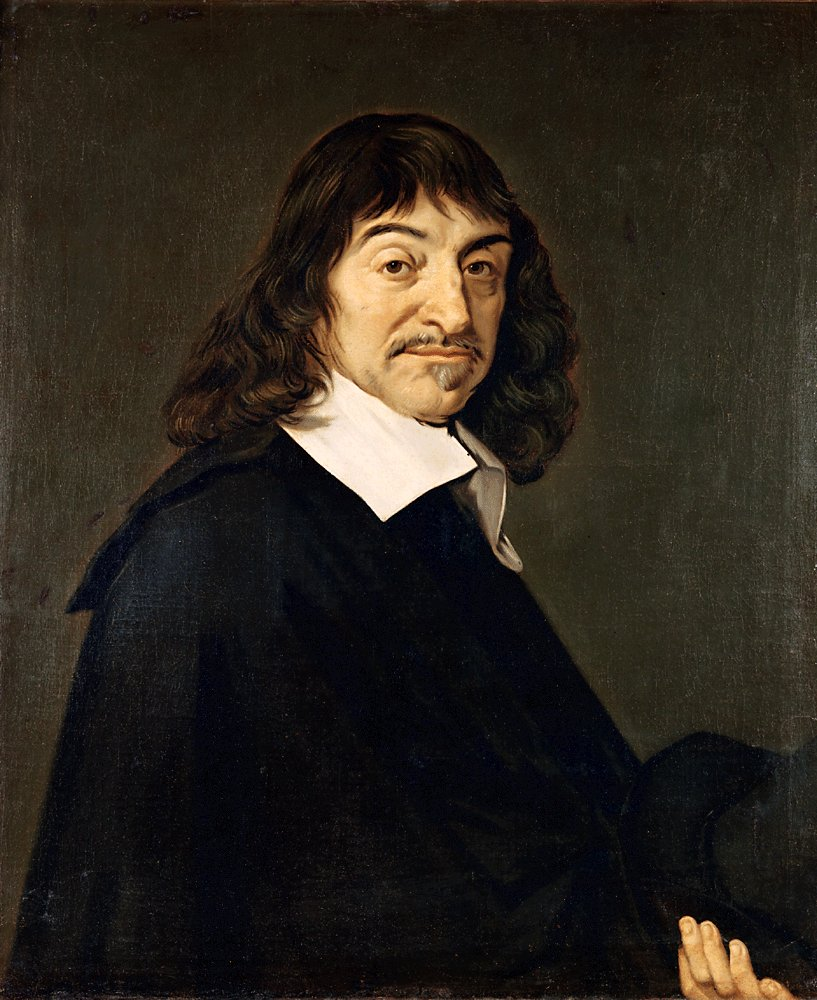
René Descartes.

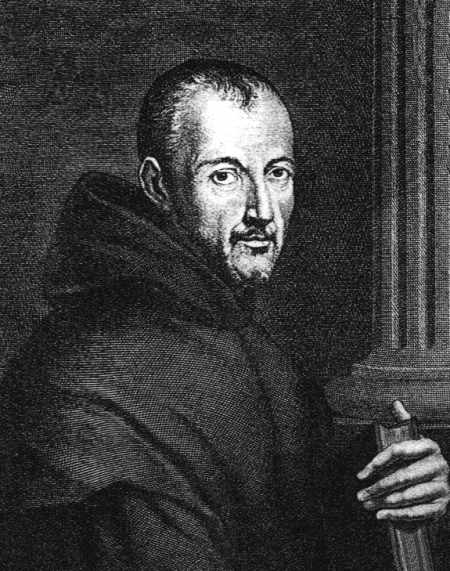
Marin Mersenne.

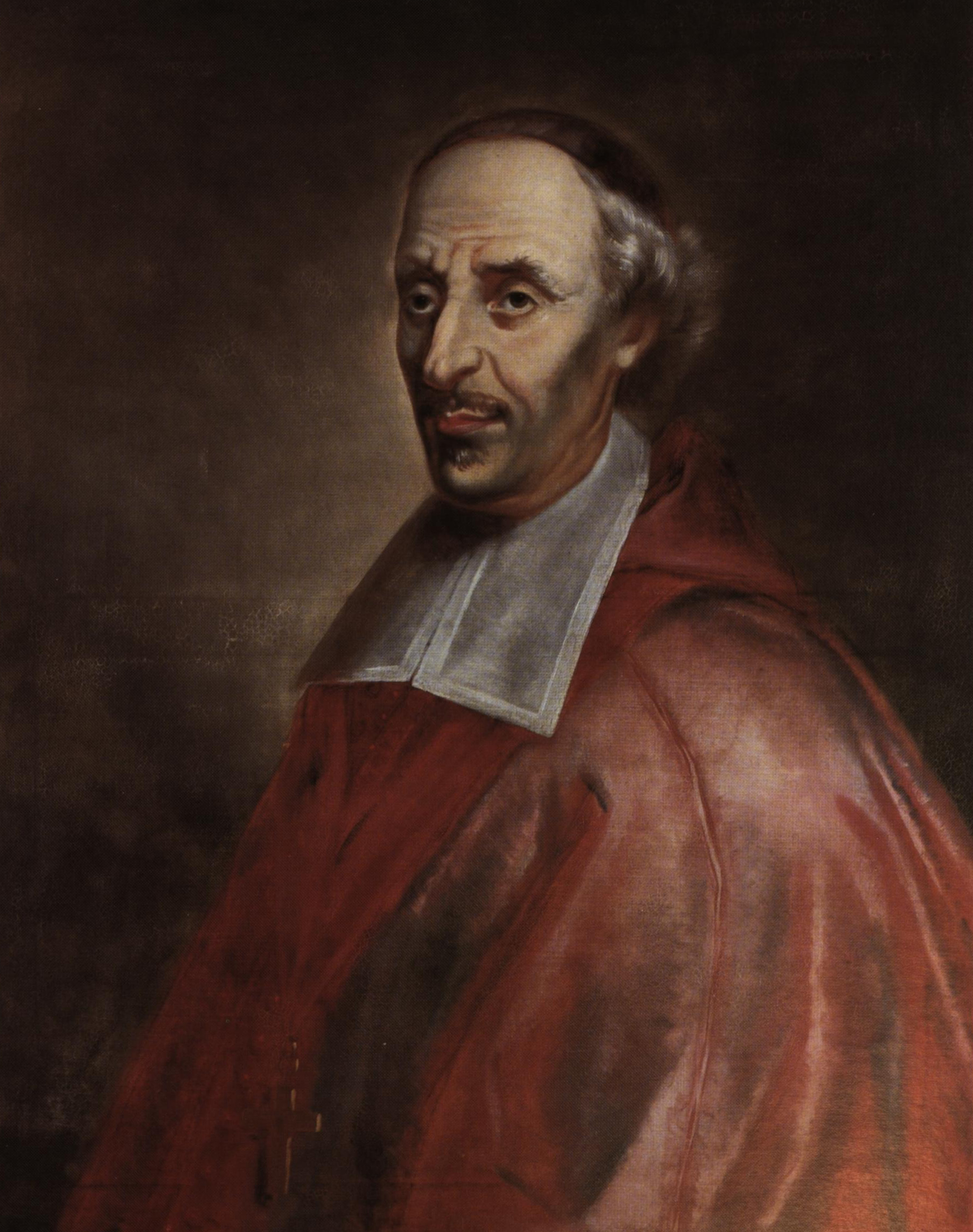
François de Montmorency-Laval.

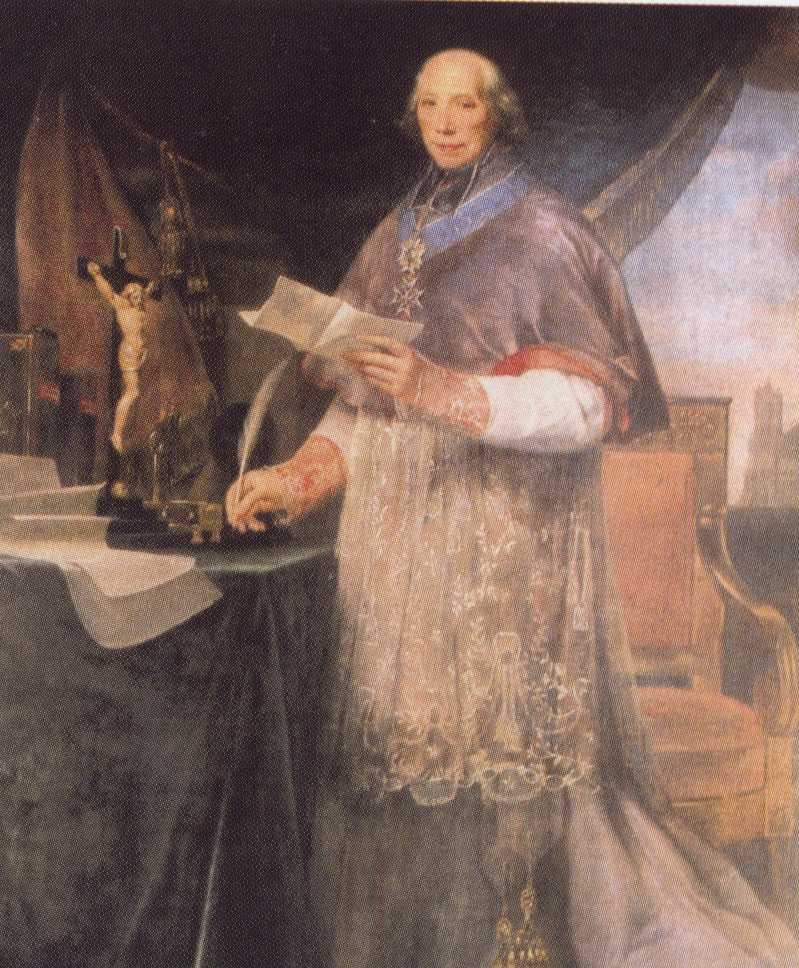
Alexandre-Angélique de Talleyrand-Périgord.

== Bibliography ==
- Clère, Jules. Histoire de l'École de La Flèche, depuis sa fondation par Henri IV jusqu'à sa réorganisation en Prytanée impérial militaire (in French). Impr. de E. Jourdain. p. 382.
- de Rochemonteix, Camille (1889). Un collège de Jésuites aux xviie et xviiie siècles : Le Collège Henri IV de La Flèche (in French) (1st ed.). Leguicheux.
- Fouqueray, Henri (1922). Histoire de la Compagnie de Jésus en France, des origines à la suppression (1528-1762) (in French) (3rd ed.). Picard.
- Delattre, Pierre (1953). Les Établissements des jésuites en France depuis quatre siècles (in French) (1st to 4th ed.). Institut supérieur de théologie.
- Moisy, Pierre (1958). Les Églises des Jésuites de l'ancienne assistance de France (in French). Rome: IHSI.
- Salbert, Jacques (1961). "La Chapelle Saint-Louis du collège des Jésuites de La Flèche en Anjou". Annales de Bretagne et des Pays de l'Ouest (in French). 68 (1). Annales de Bretagne: 163–187. doi:10.3406/abpo.1961.2127.
- Moisy, Pierre (1964). "La chapelle du collège des jésuites de La Flèche". Congrès archéologique de France. 122e session. Anjou. 1964 (in French). Société française d'archéologie.
- Dufourcq, Norbert (1964). Le grand orgue de la chapelle Saint-Louis du Prytanée militaire de La Flèche (in French). Paris: Éditions A. et J. Picard & Cie.
- Schilte, Pierre (1980). La Flèche intra-muros (in French). Farré.
- Beaupère, Bernard (1985). Histoire du Prytanée national militaire (in French). Paris: Charles-Lavauzelle. ISBN 2-7025-0102-8.
- Le Bœuf, François; Lasa, François (1995). La Flèche. Le Prytanée. Sarthe. Images du Patrimoine (in French). Nantes: Association pour le développement de l'Inventaire général des Pays de la Loire. ISBN 2-906344-48-6.
- Collectif (2004). Du Collège royal au Prytanée militaire : 1604-2004 Quatre cents ans d'éducation à La Flèche (in French). Association Amicale des Anciens Élèves du Prytanée Militaire.
- Chanteloup, Luc; Aubert, Claude (2004). Les trésors du Prytanée national militaire de La Flèche (in French). La Reinette. ISBN 2-913566-22-7.
