= Antonio Santarelli =

Antonio Santarelli may refer to:

- Antonio Santarelli (archaeologist) (1832–1920), Italian archaeologist
- Antonio Santarelli (Jesuit) (1569–1649), Italian Jesuit
