= Prytanée national militaire =

Military education school in La Flèche, Sarthe, France

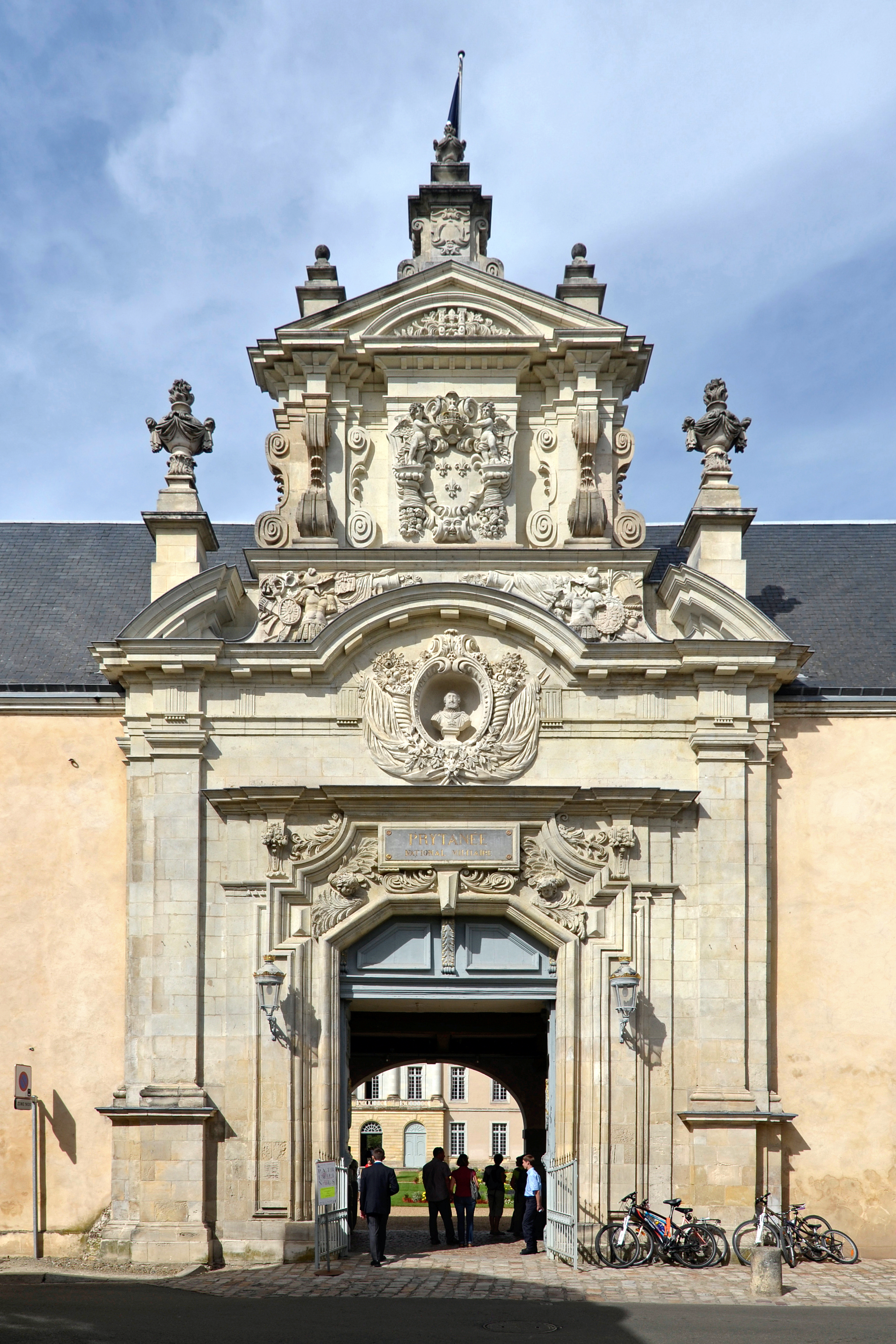
- The entrance gate of the Prytanée national militaire

Location
- La Flèche, Sarthe (72); France; 47°42′2″N 0°4′33″W

Information
- Former name: Collège royal Henri le Grand – Jesuit College of La Flèche (1604–1762)
- Type: Military education
- Established: 1604; 422 years ago
- Website: prytanee-national-militaire.fr

The Prytanée national militaire (French pronunciation: [pʁitane nɑsjɔnal militɛːʁ]) is a French military school managed by the French military, offering regular secondary education as well as special preparatory classes, equivalent in level to the first years of university, for students who wish to enter French military academies. The school is located in western France in the city of La Flèche.

At first founded in 1604 by the king Henri IV, the school was given to the Jesuits in the aim to "instruct the young people and make them fall in love with sciences, honour and virtue, so that they may be able to serve the public". It then became the "Prytanée" wanted by Napoleon in 1800.

== History ==
=== From the Château-Neuf to the creation of the royal college ===
Françoise d'Alençon, who had become a widow in 1537, decided to retire in her land of La Flèche, which she had received as a gift from her husband Charles de Bourbon. The old feodal castle, actually Carmes Castle, was too old and with no comfort, Françoise d'Alençon ordered the construction of a new building. The "Château-Neuf" (New Castle) was erected between 1539 and 1541 outside of the city, in the place of the Prytanée Militaire and following the plans of the architect Jean Delespine. Some recent new elements give a better idea of the original castle and garden.

In 1550, after her death, her son Antoine of Navarre inherits of her possessions. With his wife Jeanne d'Albret, inheritor of the Kingdom of Navarre, he stays in La Flèche multiple times, as in February 1552 and then in May 1553, a few months before their son's birth, the future king Henri IV.

On 3 December 1603, by letters patent sent from Rouen, Henri IV authorised the return of the Jesuits, who had been banned by the parliament of Paris in 1594 after the failed attack against the King made by one of their latter pupils, Jean Châtel. The King allows them to live in the places where they were before their departure and in other cities. Henri IV recommends them to particularly stay in his house of La Flèche in order to establish their college.

The first Jesuits priests arrive to La Flèche in the beginning of November 1603, led by Pierre Barny, named rector of the college. In January 1604, the college welcomes its first students. From its first year, the college knows a success and counts around 1 000 pupils. Their number grows fast in the following years.

=== The Jesuit College (1604–1762) ===
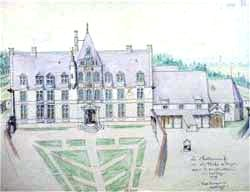
The castle of La Flèche

The first Jesuits left Pont-à-Mousson on 16 October 1603, and reached La Flèche on 2 January 1604. They started to teach grammar, rhetorics, Latin, Greek, Hebrew, philosophy, mathematics, and theology. A foundation edict was issued at Fontainebleau in May 1607, in which the building started to take its present shape.

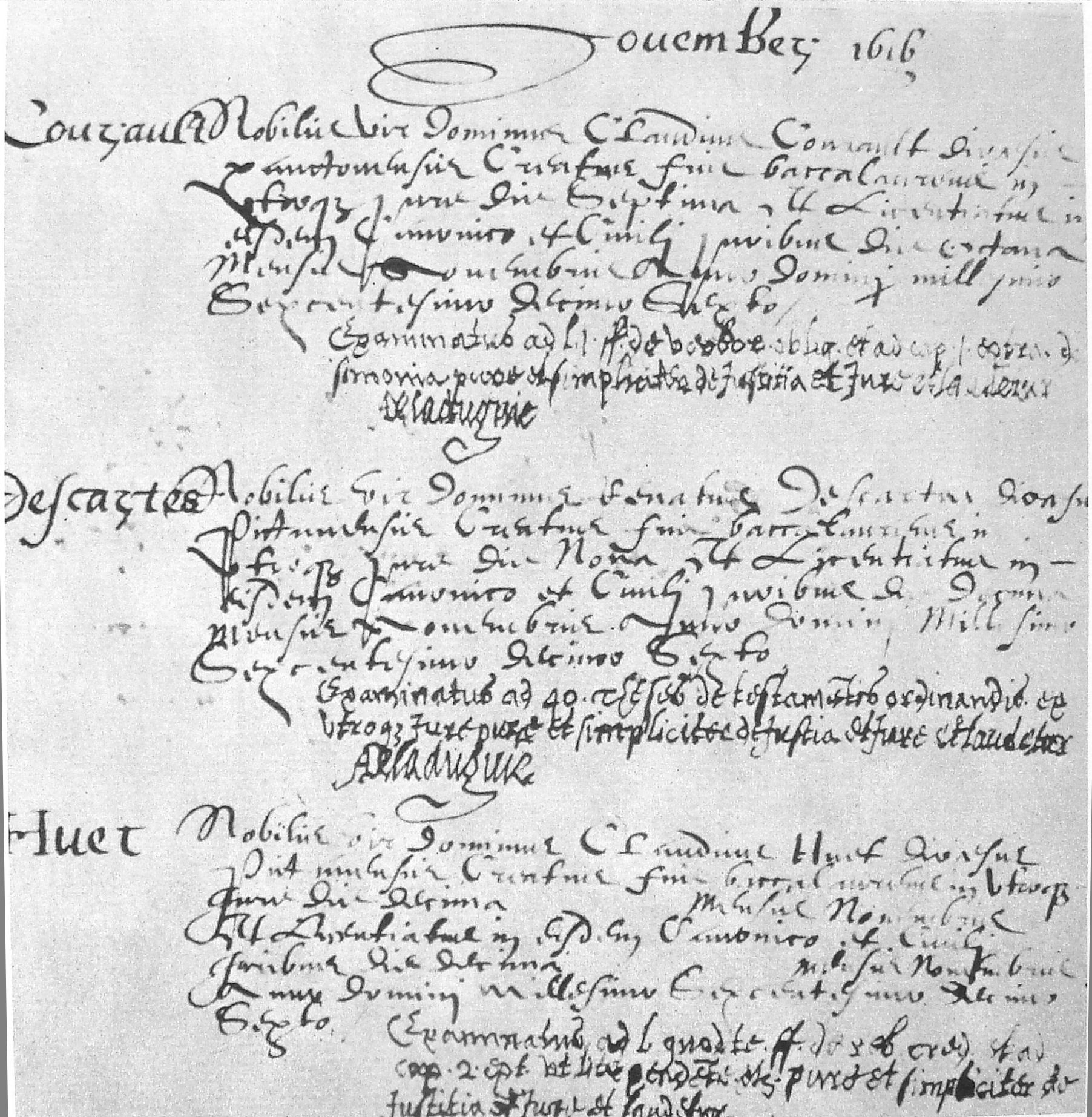
Graduation registry for Descartes at the Collège royal Henri le Grand, 1616

René Descartes was one of the first and most illustrious students of the school from 1607 to 1615, and introduced the school in his Discourse on Method under the phrase "I was studying in one of the most celebrated schools in Europe".

The Collège royal Henri le Grand (better known as the Jesuit College of La Flèche) continued to expand, and, upon the death of Henry IV, a vast church was built, in which the hearts of Henry IV and his wife queen Marie de Medicis were enshrined.

==== Missions to China and the Americas ====
Many of the Jesuit missionaries who went to the China during the 17th century had been trained at the College. Among them were Énemond Massé, who became an early missionary to Canada and became Minister of the College upon his return in 1614. When he went back to Canada, he was accompanied by Charles Lalemant, another alumnus of the school. Paul Le Jeune, also a student of the College, is considered as the "father of the Jesuit missions in New France", and was the Superior of the Jesuits in Quebec from 1632 to 1639. Others were Erard Bille, Jacques Buteux, Nicolas Adam, Barthélemy Vimont, Paul Ragueneau, Claude de Quentin, Isaac Jogues.

In China also, numerous students of the College became active participants in the missions. Three of the five Jesuits sent by Louis XIV to China were from the Collège: Jean de Fontaney, the Superior of the mission, who had been a professor of mathematics there and became rector of the school until 1710 after his return from China; Joachim Bouvet, who was a philosophy student in 1676, became a teacher to the Kangxi Emperor; Claude Visdelou, who was a repetitor and a teacher at the school from 1676 to 1678. Others included Guillaume le Couteux, Pierre Foureau, Charles de Broissia, Emeric de Chavagnac, Jean-François Fouquet, and Joseph Labbe.

Around 1650, the College became a centre of cosmopolitan learning, as "Americans, Indians, Tartars, Russians, and even Chinese visited it". In 1751, two Chinese students were enrolled: Yang Dewang (Etienne Yang Tche-teh), and Gao Ren (Louis Kao Fen).

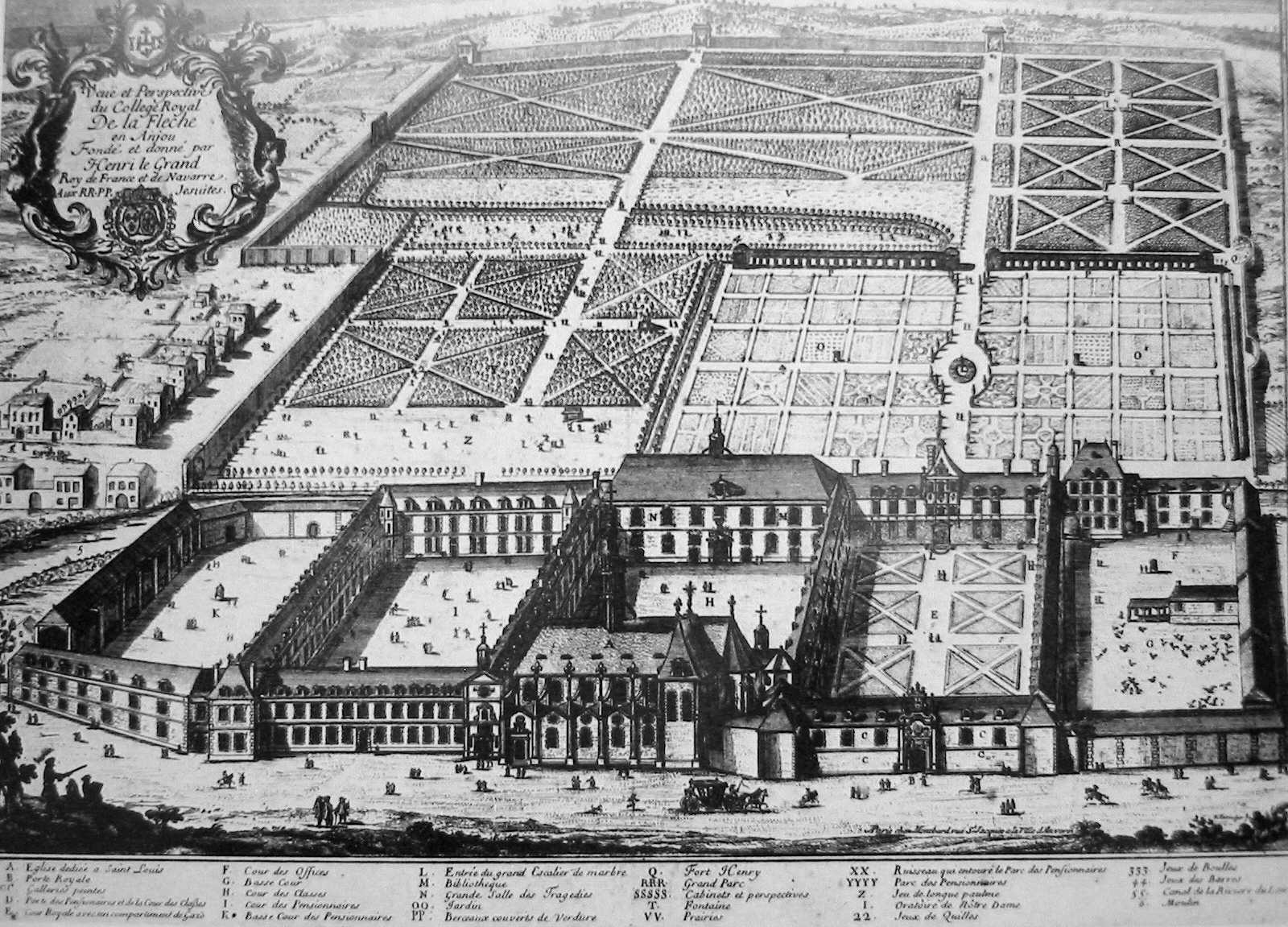
Engraving of the Prytanée, 18th century

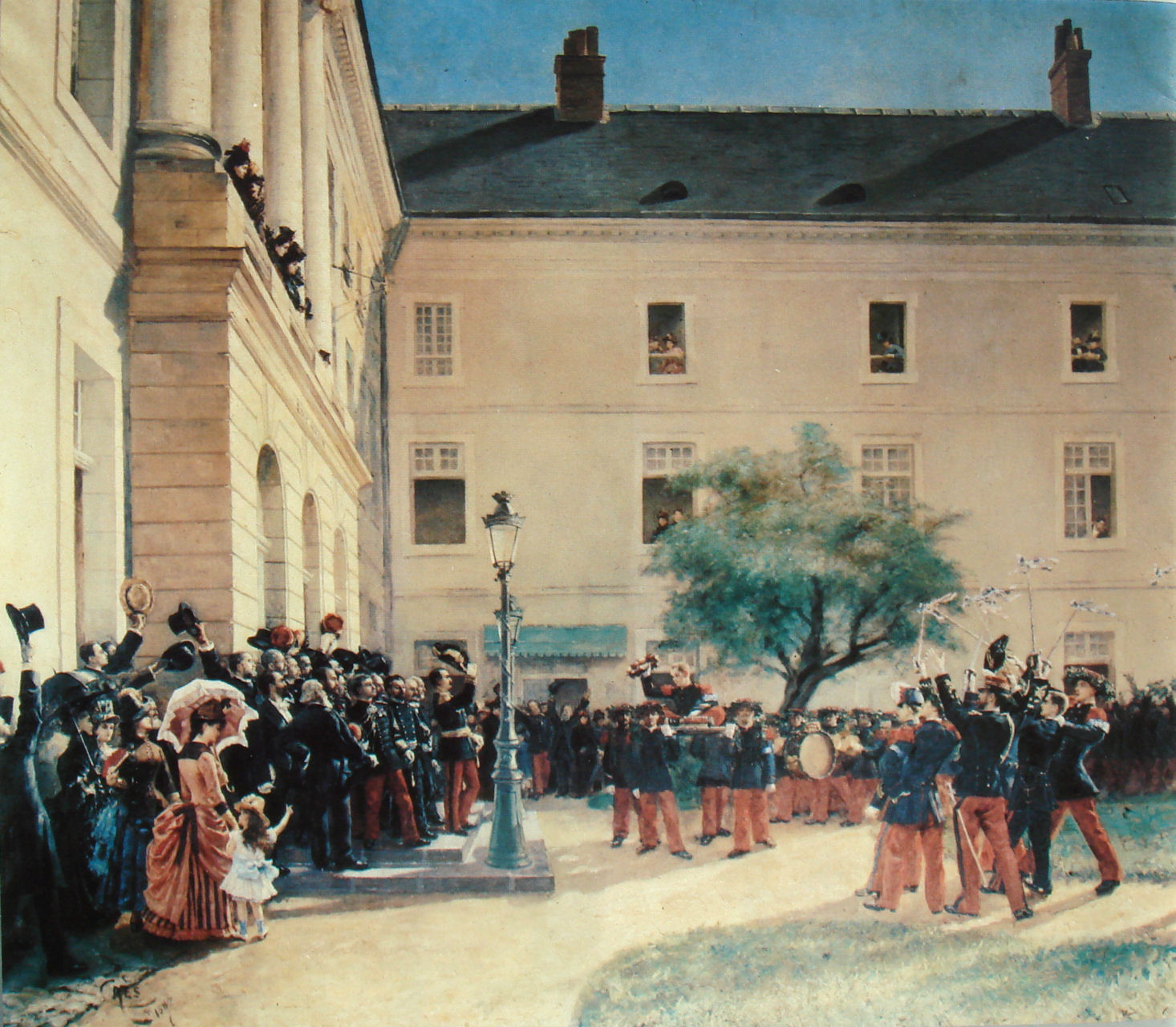
Le Triomphe du Prix d'Honneur, 1887, M. Crès

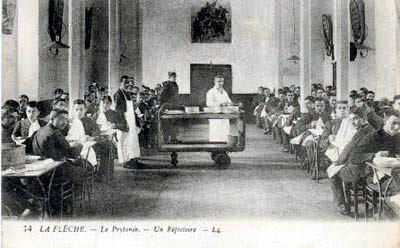
Prytanée students having lunch around 1900

=== Cadets school (1764–1776) ===
In 1764 following the expulsion of the Jesuits, after a lapse of two years, the school was transformed by Louis XV and Choiseul into a military institution designed to train young cadets for admission to the École Militaire, the "École de cadets ou École militaire préparatoire à l'École militaire du Champ de Mars". These efforts at creating military institutions followed military defeats in the Seven Years' War (1756–1763). The school was reserved to 250 students of noble extraction, as well as sons of officers who were wounded or died in combat, and the sons of the Chevaliers de Saint-Louis.

=== College (1776–1793) ===
In 1776 the Count of St Germain attempted to close the school, but it was re-established by Louis XVI, who gave its management to the "Fathers of the Christian Doctrine" (Pères de la Doctrine chrétienne). Among others, they educated the future General Bertrand, who accompanied Napoleon to Saint Helena, and the two Chappe brothers, who invented the aerial telegraph.

The College was closed in 1793 following the advent of the French Revolution. For a while, the buildings were used for a variety of purposes, such as becoming a cordonery for the Army of the Republic.

=== Prytanée militaire (1808–present) ===
On 24 March 1808, Napoleon renamed the school "Prytanée militaire", in a classic reference to the Greek prytaneis (literally "Presidents"), an executive body acting as the religious and political heart of ancient Greek cities. As Napoleon had moved to Fontainebleau to establish his court, he had decided to transfer the "École spéciale Militaire de Fontainebleau" to Paris, and the "Prytanée de Saint-Cyr" to La Flèche. Since then various names were adopted for the school, such as "École royale militaire" (1814–1830), Collège royal militaire (1831–1848), Collège national militaire (1848–1853), Prytanée impérial militaire (1853–1870), Prytanée militaire and Prytanée national militaire (since 1870).

During World War II in 1940, the Prytanée had to be moved for a few years successively to Billom, Valence, then Briançon.

== Today ==
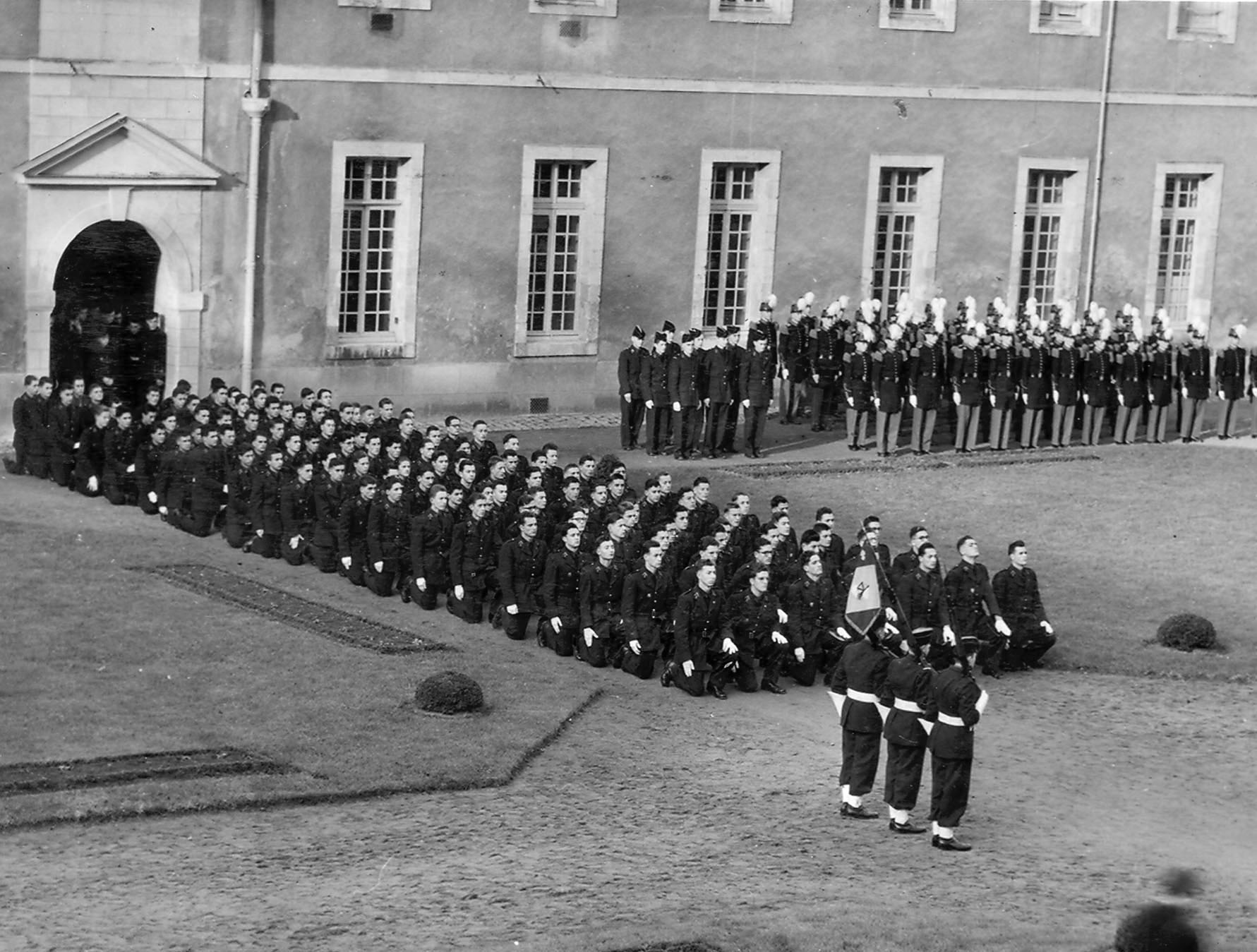
Swearing-in ceremony, for Prytanée student preparing to École de Saint-Cyr c. 1950.

Today the Prytanée provides secondary education and also has "Classes préparatoires", that is, preparatory classes to the entrance examinations of the French elite Grandes Écoles, such as École polytechnique, the Navy École navale, the Army École spéciale militaire de Saint-Cyr, the École de l'Air and various civilian engineering or commercial graduate schools.

The school's students are nicknamed "Brutions", as a classic reference to the inhabitants of the Bruttium region of Roman Italy, who had a reputation for their roughness and fighting spirit.

=== Insignas ===
The school grades received by students are even today symbolized by military insignias which are worn on the traditional uniform (Uniforme de tradition), starting with "Sergent-Major" (4 golden chevrons) for the top of a class, "Sergent" (3 golden chevrons), "Caporal-Chef" (2 red and 1 golden chevrons), and finally "Caporal" (2 red chevrons). Typically, the top ten students of each class during a given quarter would receive such insignias.

Students also have colored shoulder badges for each year, attached to the daily fatigues ("Uniforme de travail"), starting with blue for the first year of high school, orange for the second, and green for the third. These badges can further be adorned with various small symbols and decorations, especially expressing the type of career to which each student is aspires.

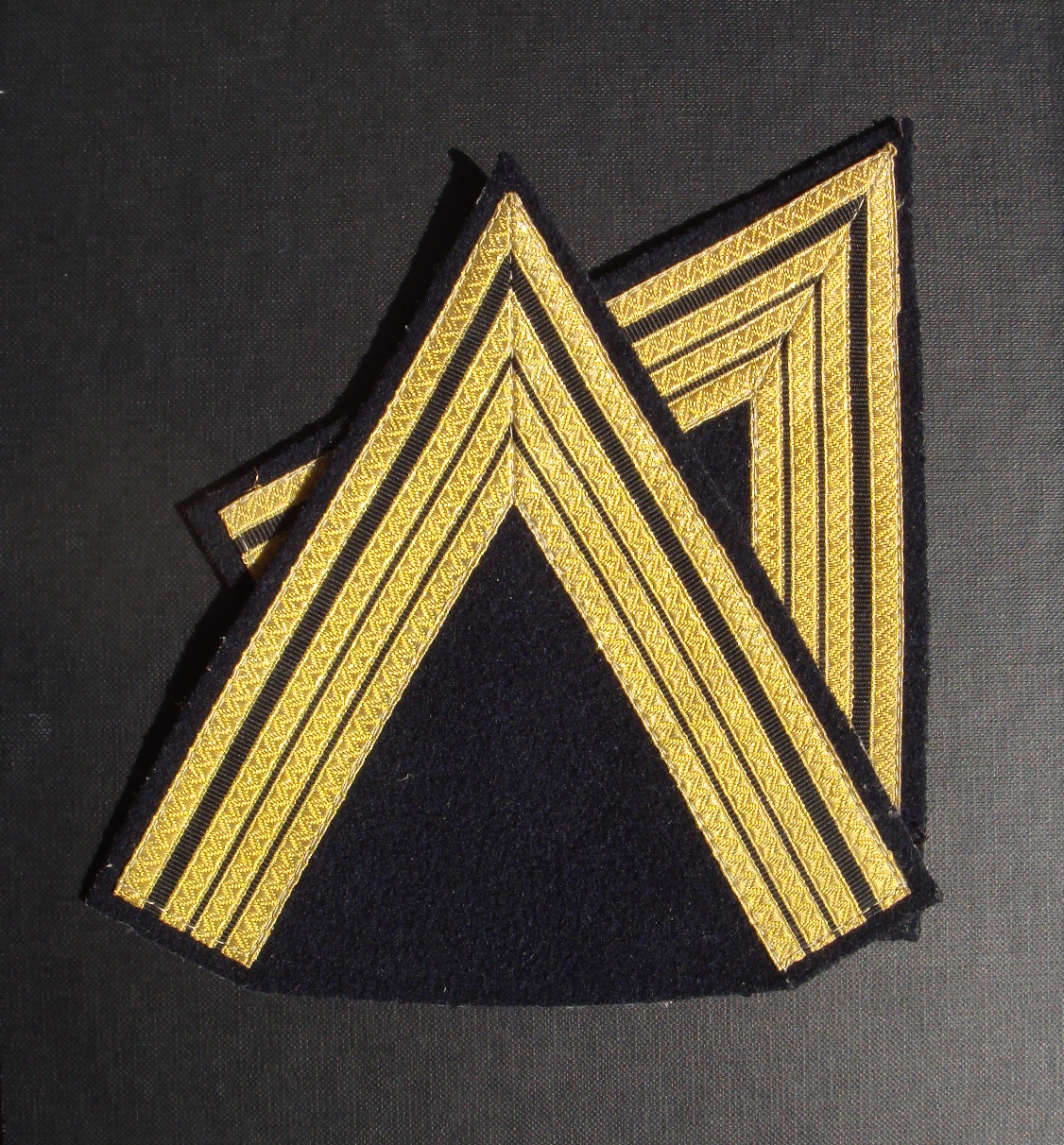
Sergent-Major insignas

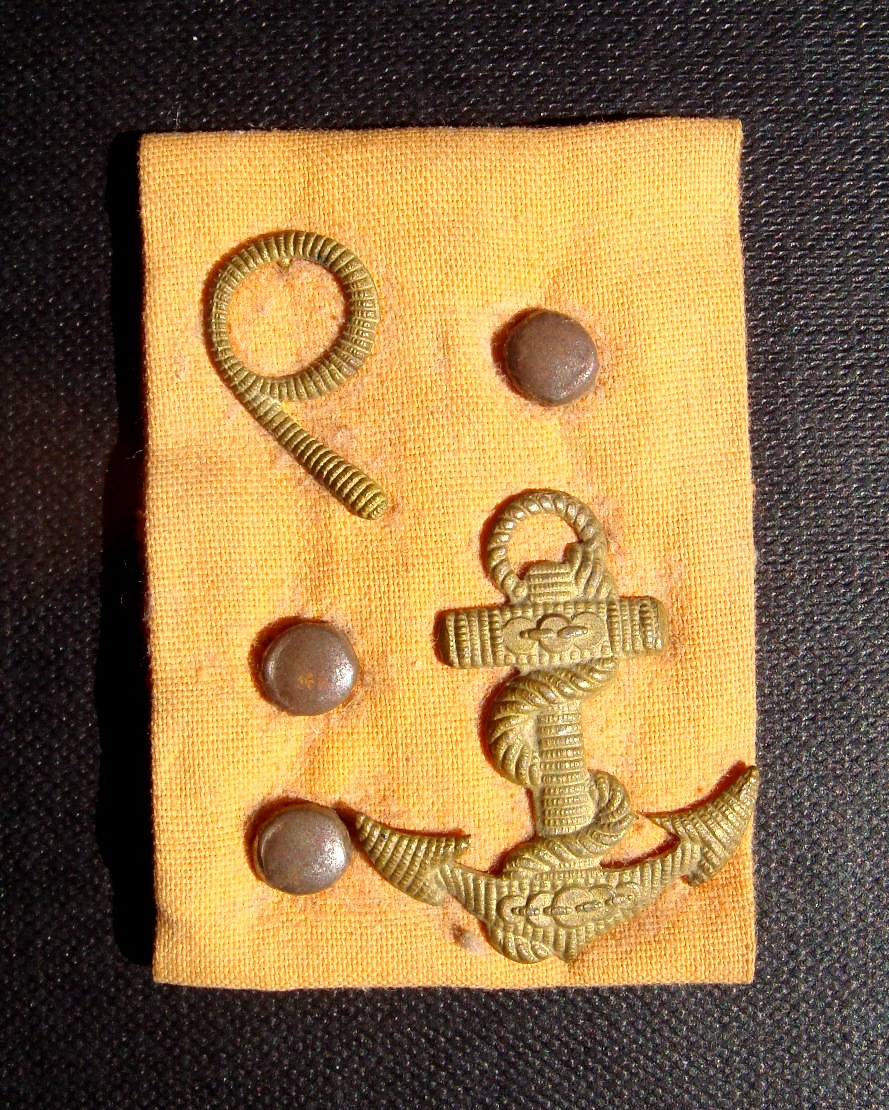
Colored shoulder badge, with a "Navy" anchor

== Famous alumni ==
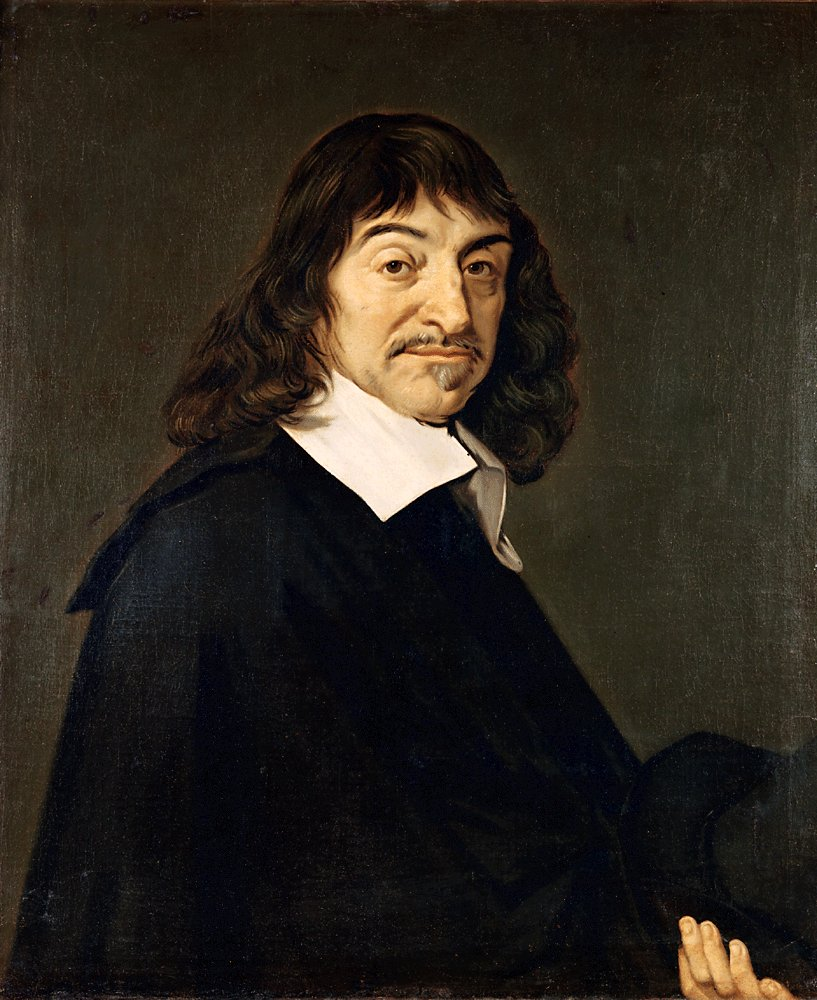
René Descartes (1596–1650).

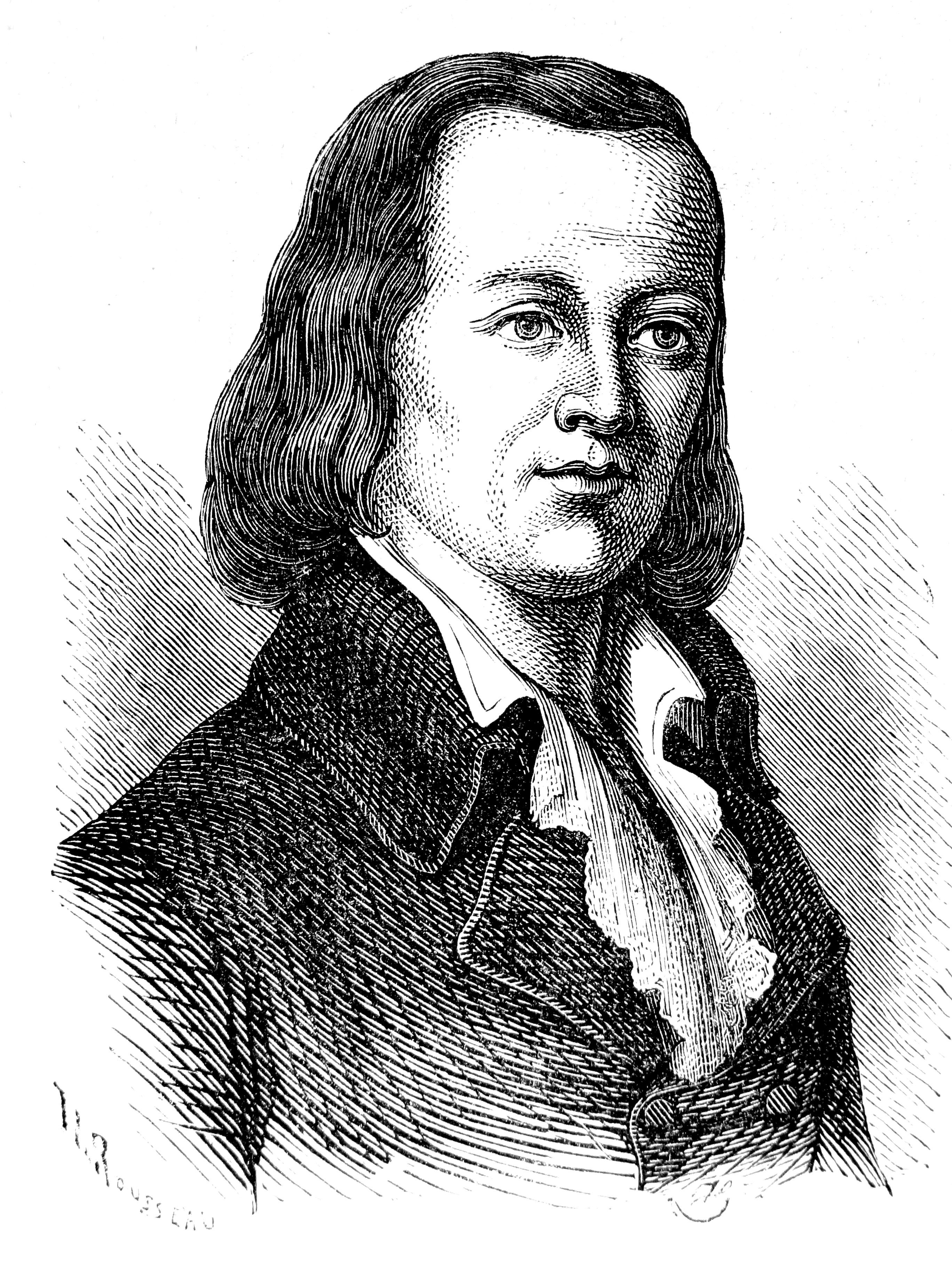
Claude Chappe (1763–1805).

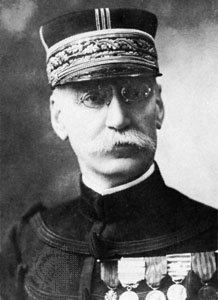
Gallieni (1849–1916).

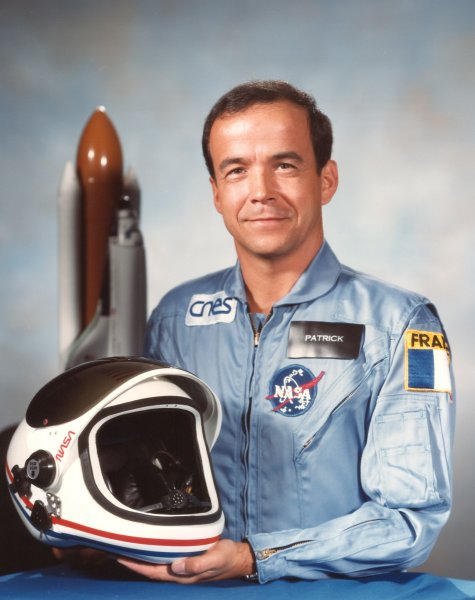
Patrick Baudry (1946–).

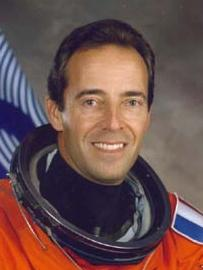
Jean-François Clervoy (1958–).

The Prytanée has trained various military and non-military celebrities. In chronological order:

- Marin Mersenne (1588–1648), theologian, mathematician
- Pierre Séguier, statesman and Chancellor of France (1588–1672)
- René Descartes, philosopher (1596–1650)
- Comte de Guébriant (1602–1643), Marshal of France
- La Rochefoucauld (1613–1680), writer
- Gabriel Calloet-Kerbrat (1616-1620 – 1697), agriculturist and writer
- François de Laval (1623–1708), first Bishop of New France
- Jean Picard (1629–1682), astronomer
- Joseph Sauveur (1653–1716), mathematician and physicist
- James Fitz-James (1670–1734), Duke of Berwick and Marshal of France
- du Petit Thouars (1760–1798), Navy officer, hero of the Battle of Aboukir Bay
- Claude Chappe (1763–1805), inventor of the optical telegraph
- Bertrand (1773–1844), General, follower of Napoleon at Saint Helena
- Auguste Davezac (1780–1851), United States Ambassador to the Netherlands
- Pélissier (1794–1864), Marshal of France
- René François Regnier (1794–1881), ecclesiastical writer
- Achille Baraguey d'Hilliers (1795–1878), Marshal of France
- Antoine Brutus Menier (1795–1853), entrepreneur and founder of Chocolat Menier
- Antoine François Prévost (1797–1863), novelist
- Alessandro Barnabò (1801–1874), Catholic Cardinal
- Louis d'Aurelle de Paladines (1804–1877), General
- Courtot de Cissey (1810–1882), General
- Charles-Denis Bourbaki (1816–1897), General
- Adrien Joseph Deutsch (1818–1895)
- Louis Rossel (1844–1871), Minister of War in the Paris Commune
- Gallieni (1849–1916), Marshal of France
- Amédée-François Lamy (1858–1900), French officer, conqueror of Chad
- Georges Catroux (1877–1969), French general
- Gabriel Voisin (1880–1973), aeronautical pioneer
- Émile Mireaux (1885–1969), economist, Minister of Education
- Prince Husain Bey (1893-1964/9), Crown Prince of Tunisia
- Jacques Massu (1908–2002), General
- Pierre Guillaumat (1909–1991), entrepreneur and statesman (Minister of the Army, Education)
- Kléber Haedens (1913–1973), writer
- François Missoffe (1919–2003), statesman
- Jean-Claude Brialy (1933–2007), actor
- Pierre Agostini (1941–), French experimental physicist and the 2023 Nobel laureate in physics
- Michel Virlogeux (1946–), architect of Millau Viaduct, the tallest vehicular bridge in the world
- Patrick Baudry (1946–), astronaut
- Antoine Compagnon (1950–), writer
- Jean-François Clervoy (1958–), astronaut
- Caroline Aigle (1974–2007), first French female fighter pilot
- Rodolphe Belmer (1969–), CEO of TF1 Group

== Famous professors ==
- Pierre Laromiguière (1756–1837)
- Léon Fleuriot (1923–1987)

== See also ==
- List of Jesuit sites
- Saint-Louis church, La Flèche

== Notes ==
On vit arriver au Collège "des Américains, des Indiens, des Tartares, des Russes et même des Chinois", Marchant de Burbure (1803)
