= Étienne Noël =

Étienne Noël (29 September 1581 – 16 October 1659) was a French Jesuit priest and natural philosopher. He was a teacher of René Descartes and is best known for clashing with Blaise Pascal on the idea of vacuum.

== Biography ==
Noël was born in Bassigny and joined the Society of Jesus at Verdun in 1599. He then became a teacher at Rouen in 1605 and in 1606 at the Jesuit college of La Flèche. René Descartes was a student there from 1607 to 1614 and Noël taught philosophy there. In 1646 he became rector at the College de Clermont in Paris. While there he published Aphorismi physici (1646) and Sol flamma (1646) and sent copies of it to Descartes. He was a follower of Aristotelian physics. In 1646 Pascal conducted experiments along with Evangelista Torricelli and published Expériences nouvelles touchant le vide (1647) in which he considered what the region above the mercury column was made of. Pascal suggested that it was a vacuum, which Noël opposed using the Aristotelian concept and suggested that it was filled with a part of air that could pass through the pores in glass. Descartes also suggested that some other form of matter existed. Noël published Le Plein du Vuide in response in 1648. Pascal responded to this initially in a letter to Jacques Le Pailleur and later directly to Noël. Pascal noted that it was not enough for a hypothesis to be true based on its consequences but also by whether it leads to contradictions. The debate was followed up by the Puy de Dôme experiment on September 19, 1648.

Noël died in La Flèche.

== Writings ==
His writings included:

- Aphorismi physici, seu Physicæ peripateticæ principia breviter ac dilucide proposita, La Flèche, 1646.
- Sol flamma, sive Tractatus de sole, ut flamma est, ejusque pabulo, Paris, 1647.
- Le Plein du Vuide, ou le corps dont le vuide apparent des expériences nouvelles est rempli trouvé par d'autres expériences, confirmé par les mesmes et démonstré par raisons physiques, Paris, 1648.
- Physica vetus et nova, Paris, 1648.
- Interpres naturæ sive Arcana physica septem libris comprehensa, La Flèche, 1653.
- Examen logicarum, La Flèche, 1658.
