= Pierre Coton =

French Jesuit and royal confessor

Pierre Coton (7 March 1564, at Néronde in Forez – 19 March 1626, at Paris) was a French Jesuit and royal confessor.

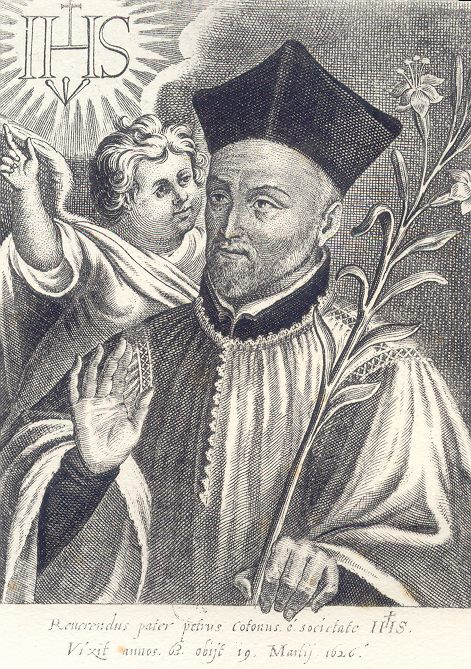
Pierre Coton (1564–1626).

== Life ==
Coton studied law at Paris and Bourges, entered the Society of Jesus at the age of twenty-five, and was sent to Milan to study philosophy. Here he became acquainted with Charles Borromeo. On his return to his native country he preached with success at Roanne, Avignon, Nîmes, Grenoble, and Marseille. An acquaintance with Henry IV of France soon ripened into friendship. The Archbishopric of Arles being vacant, the king offered it to Coton, who refused it. Father Coton had for two years previous to the death of Henry been confessor to his son, the young Dauphin.

The king having recalled the exiled Jesuits to France, their enemies could not pardon the influence Father Coton had in bringing this about, and an attempt was made to assassinate him. Some writers have pretended that Coton was not above suspicion on the doctrine of regicide, and when Henry IV was assassinated, they accused Coton of defending Ravaillac, the king's murderer. If his enemies at court had any knowledge that he held such views, they failed to make it public. In defense of the Jesuits, Coton issued Lettre déclaratoire de la doctrine de Pères Jésuites, which made him the target of much hostility and suspicion.

In 1608, Father Coton called Father Pierre Biard away from his professorship at Lyon ordering him to take charge of the mission in the new French colony at Acadia.

In September 1610, the biting satire Anti-Coton, in which it is proved that the Jesuits are guilty of parricide against Henri IV, was followed by many pamphlets for and against the Jesuits. The Anti-Coton pamphlet attacked the Jesuits, and especially Father Coton, the confessor of Henry IV, of whose murder the Jesuits had been accused by their enemies. Daurignac says (Hist. Soc. Jesus, vol. i., p. 295) that this pamphlet was attributed to Pierre Du Moulin, a Protestant minister of Charenton. This and other similar attacks on the Jesuits had been circulated in Canada, and had prejudiced against them even many Catholics.

Coton continued in his capacity as confessor to the new king, Louis XIII, until 1617, when he left the court at the age of fifty-four and withdrew to the novitiate at Lyon. He then traversed the provinces of the South as a missionary, and went to Milan, Loreto, and Rome to fulfil the vows the reigning king had made to the Blessed Virgin, St. Charles, and St. Peter. He returned to France as provincial of the Society and preached at Paris in the church of S. Gervaise; the king and the whole court flocked to hear him.

At this period a book published by Santarelli, an Italian Jesuit, who attributed to the pope the power of deposing kings who were guilty of certain crimes, and under such circumstances of absolving their subjects from their allegiance, was the object of severe attacks from the many enemies of the Society of Jesus in France. The doctrines which Santarelli expounded had been accepted in the Middle Ages, and were still professed by the Ultramontane theologians, although they had become impossible in practice. This book was in Paris, under the rule of Richelieu, construed into a provocation to regicide and rebellion. These views were attributed to every Jesuit. The Parliament demanded that all Jesuits residing in France should be called upon to sign a protestation disavowing all the doctrines contained in Santarelli's treatise. Coton was ill at the time. On his deathbed, he was visited by an envoy of Parliament, who informed him of the condemnation pronounced against Santarelli and the severe measures that threatened his brethren. The dying Jesuit murmured: "Is it possible that I who have served so faithfully the Kings of France should be looked upon at last as guilty of treason and a disturber of the peace?"

== Works ==
His "Institution catholique" and "Genève plagiaire" are controversial works, as also his "Sacrifice de la Messe". For his other works see De Backer, 1st ed;, II, p. 149.

== Sources ==
- Roverius, De Vita P. Petri Cotoni (Lyons, 1660)
- D'Orléans, La Vie du P. Pierre Coton (Paris, 1688)
- Prat, Recherches hist. et crit. sur la c. de Jésus en France, du temps du P. Coton (Lyons, 1876)
- Sommervogel, Bibliothèque de la Compagnie de Jésus, II, 1539
- B. N., The Jesuits, Their Foundation and History, I, 325-328
