= Santarelli =

Santarelli is an Italian surname. Notable people with the surname include:

- Andrea Santarelli (born 1993), fencer
- Antonio Santarelli (archaeologist) (1832–1920), Italian archaeologist
- Antonio Santarelli (Jesuit) (1569–1649), Italian Jesuit
- Daniele Santarelli (born 1981), volleyball coach
- Emilio Santarelli, 19th-century Tuscan sculptor
- Giuseppe Santarelli (1710–1790), composer and singer
- Simone Santarelli, footballer
