= Pierre Biard (missionary) =

- Church: Catholic Church
- Other posts: Missionary to Acadia (Port-Royal, Saint-Sauveur)

Orders
- Ordination: 1599

Personal details
- Born: 1567 Grenoble, France
- Died: 17 November 1622 (aged 54–55)

Pierre Biard (1567 – 17 November 1622) was a Jesuit missionary who was given orders by Father Pierre Coton, Jesuit provincial in Paris, to take charge of a mission at Port-Royal in Acadia, (present-day Nova Scotia, Canada) along with Father Énemond Massé.

== Biography ==
Pierre Biard was born in Grenoble, France in 1567. In 1583 he entered the Jesuit novitiate at Tournon. He taught at Billom, studied philosophy and theology at Avignon, and was ordained a priest in 1599. He also taught theology at Tournon, and Hebrew at the Collège in Lyon, where he held the chair in scholastic theology.

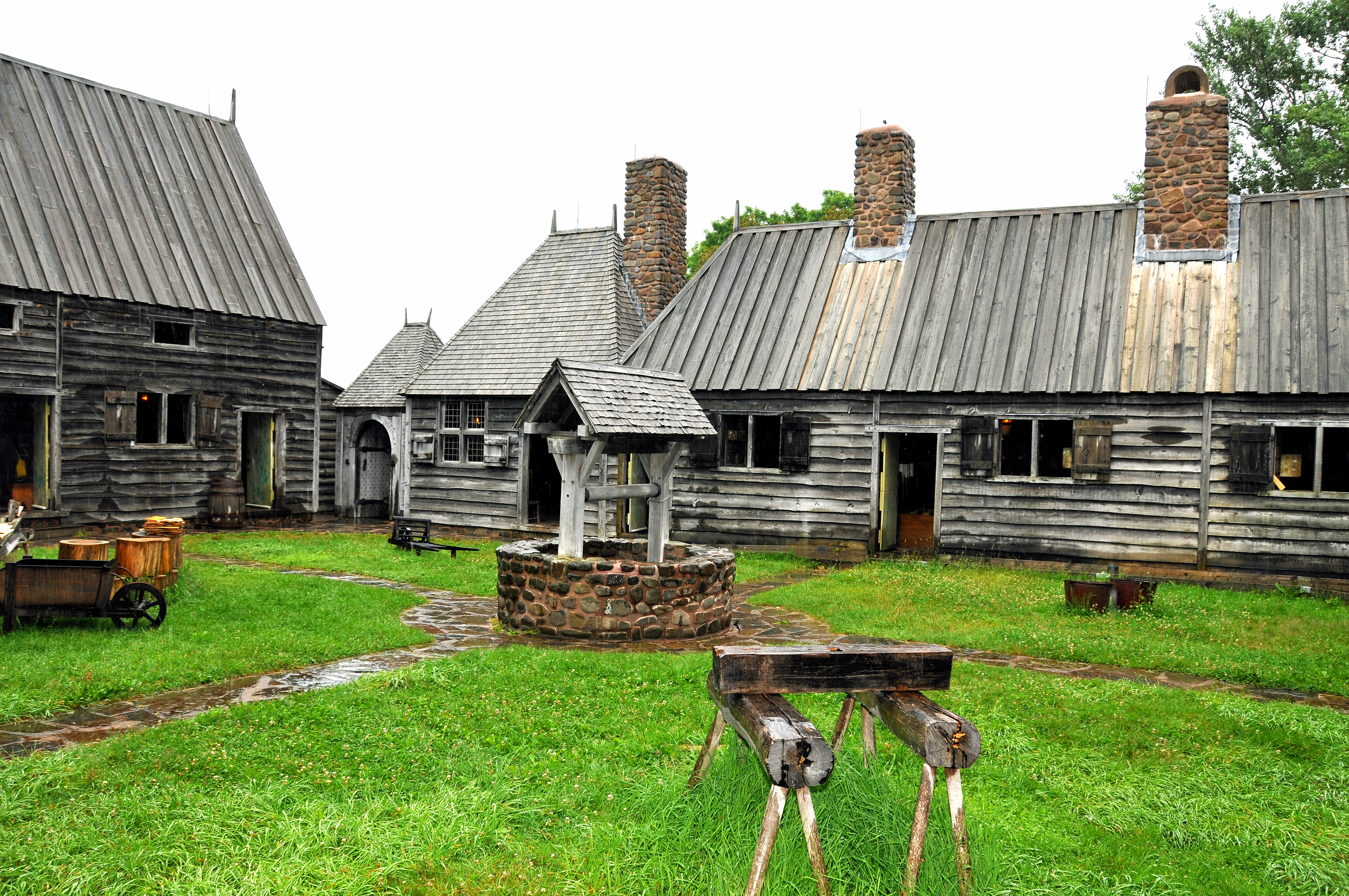
Port Royal

In 1608, the provincial of the Jesuits of Paris, Father Pierre Coton SJ called him away from his professorship with orders to serve the mission of Port-Royal in Acadia (Annapolis Royal, Nova Scotia).

=== Port Royal ===
The mission had been founded by Jean de Biencourt, known as Poutrincourt, a devout Catholic, in 1606, abandoned for financial reasons in 1607, then restored by Poutrincourt in 1610 who was appointed Lieutenant Governor by Sieur de Monts, now more interested in Quebec, founded by Champlain in 1608.

L'abbe Jesse Fleche had accompanied Poutincourt, and by the end of the year he had baptized 140 Mi'kmaq. The Mi'kmaq had known the French for over 100 years; those living near Port-Royal had known them intimately since 1606. It was common pastoral practice in France at the time to baptize without a complete instruction with the assumption that the Christian community would lead the neophytes to a fuller faith.

The son of François Gravé Du Pont abandoned the ship left to his care and went to live among the indigenous tribes, adopting their customs for himself; he was arrested by Poutrincourt in 1610 but escaped captivity. The following year Biard found the younger DuPont and brought him out on White Head Island to take public Confession, participate in Holy Mass and receive Communion reconciling himself to Poutrincourt. The younger DuPont asked Poutrincourt to dine with him as he reclaimed the ship left to his care, but during the meal Potrincourt lost his temper and seized the ship requiring Biard to come out again to make peace between the pair.

=== Biard’s 1611 mission ===
As de Monts was a Calvinist, as were a considerable number of the colonists, there was vehement opposition to the appointment of Biard and his colleague, Énemond Massé, as missionaries. Through the assistance of Antoinette de Pons, the Marquise de Guercheville, who purchased the vessel that was bringing out supplies, the Jesuits, after three years of waiting, were enabled to obtain passage by becoming part owners of the ship and cargo. Biard and Massé sailed from Dieppe on 26 January 1611.

They left Dieppe on 26 January 1611, and after a crossing taking four months, reached Port-Royal on Pentecost, 22 May. L'abbe Fleche left on the next ship bound for France. The Jesuits required fuller instruction and greater signs of faith before baptizing except when a person was in danger of death, a pastoral practice just being introduced in France. Biard vehemently criticized the earlier pastoral practise, and when those who desired baptism were refused, their resentment slowly built up against the Jesuits. In the two years they followed the stricter policy, they baptized twenty-one persons, all of whom were dying. Biard did little to soothe tensions, and fell out with the King's official, Charles de Biencourt, son of Poutrincourt, in France trying to raise funds for the colony. Biencourt hoped to use a higher number of baptisms to encourage donations.

Madame de Guercheville purchased Acadia from Sieur de Monts, obtained financial support from her many friends at the royal court, and arranged for a vessel under the authority of René Le Coq de La Saussaye at the Jesuits' request to bring them, now four, to another a locale of their choice for a new mission. One of the new missioners was Brother Gilbert Du Thet, whom Poutrincourt's agent accused of making regicide comments. The allegation disproved, Poutrincourt refused to discipline his agent and prevented both the friar and Biard from returning to France to defend the allegation. For this, Biard excommunicated Poutrincourt, which situation lasted about three months.

The Jesuits chose a bay on Mount Desert Island to found their new post, giving it the name of Saint-Sauveur, Holy Saviour. Hardly unpacked, they soon came under attack by Sir Samuel Argall, fishing out of the Virginia colony, who had been alerted to their presence by indigenous people who thought Argall was French too. The whole colony quickly surrendered to Argall's superior firepower. Brother Du Thet, SJ, being killed in the fray, the first Jesuit to die in North America.

Biard and some French colonists, skilled labourers, were taken to Jamestown, Virginia. There the Governor intended to hang them as pirates on English land, at which point Argall owned up that he had stolen La Sassaye's official documents from King Louis XIII, making their position legal.

Argall was then ordered to take Pere Biard and Quentin on a mission to destroy all traces of the French presence on the Atlantic coast, an earlier base on the Ste. Croix River, at Saint-Sauveur, and at Port-Royal. They succeeded, and a controversy arose over who directed them to the well hidden Port-Royal, Biard being a suspect. He in turn pointed the finger at a Maliseet chief.

=== Later life ===
On the journey home, Biard's ship was blown east to the Azores, and thence sailed to Wales where he and Quentin were freed to return to France where they resumed their previous ministry; Biard stayed in France and served as a theology professor and military chaplain.

Biard died in 1622 after writing about these adventures.

Biard's Relations de la Nouvelle France, published in 1616, was one of the earliest such relations, which only began regular annual publication in 1632.
