= Jean Delespine =

French angevin architect (1505–1576)

Jean Delespine or Jean de l'Espine (1505–1576), was a French angevin architect of the Renaissance.

== Biography ==
Jean Delespine is attributed about forty works, almost all located in the former province of Anjou.

Jean Delespine was, at his beginnings, the student of Jean Mariau, an architect in Angers, to whom he succeeded, in 1535, as Commissaire des œuvres et réparations de la ville of Angers.

Delespine was in charge of important urban developments. He worked under the direction of a succession of mayors, including Jean de Pincé, Pierre Poyet and René Ayrault.

His official functions were at the origin of contacts with the Controller General of the Bâtiments de France, Philibert Delorme, a great Renaissance architect, (Palais des Tuileries, Château d'Anet) attached to Anjou as commendatory abbot of the Abbaye Saint-Serge d'Angers.

In 1571, Delespine ceased his duties as curator of the city's works.

In 1576, he died in his home of the rue Beaurepaire in Angers. His body lies in the church next to the Carmelite convent. His tomb bore an epitaph to the glory of his architectural talents: ... mais qui n’admireroit ta hardie entreprise / de ta brave lanterne au pignon de l’église / posée en l’air si hault entre deux piramides / dont les poincts eslevez touchent aux nues liquides / ....

Brunno de Tartifune also reports some extracts of this epitaph: On cognoist l'arbre au fruit, l'ouvrier à l'ouvrage / les tiens portent assez, L'Espine, tesmoignage / De l'excellent esprit dont Dieu t'avoit pourveu / quand parmi les plus grands en crédit on téa veu.

== Works ==
- Saint-Maurice d’Angers Cathedral. In 1533, the bell tower of the middle tower caught fire. Master Jehan of L'Espine was in charge of the reconstruction of the bell tower. He built the gallery housing the statues of Saint Maurice and his knights companions between the bases of the towers on the western façade. The statues were sculpted by Jean Giffard and Antoine Desmarais.
- Tombs and enfeux of bishops Jean Olivier and Jean du Mas in Angers Cathedral
- Château d'Ancenis
- Château of La Flèche
- Château de Serrant
- Château de Valençay.
- The original castle became a Jesuit college, and currently the military school of the Prytanée national militaire of La Flèche;
- The logis Pincé at Angers.
- The palace of Angers, seat of the présidial of Angers
- The development of a new river port in Angers under the municipality of mayor René Ayrault who will leave his name to this realization: the port Ayrault
- Modernisation of the Angevin fortifications and creation of two monumental city gates
- Reconstruction of a wing of the cloister of the hôpital Saint-Jean of Angers, currently Musée Jean-Lurçat et de la tapisserie contemporaine
- Construction of the Renaissance bell tower of Les Rosiers-sur-Loire
- Building of the bridge of Durtal
- Realization of tombs, churches, manors, mansions, fountains, etc.

== Gallery ==
Some of the works by Jean Delespine

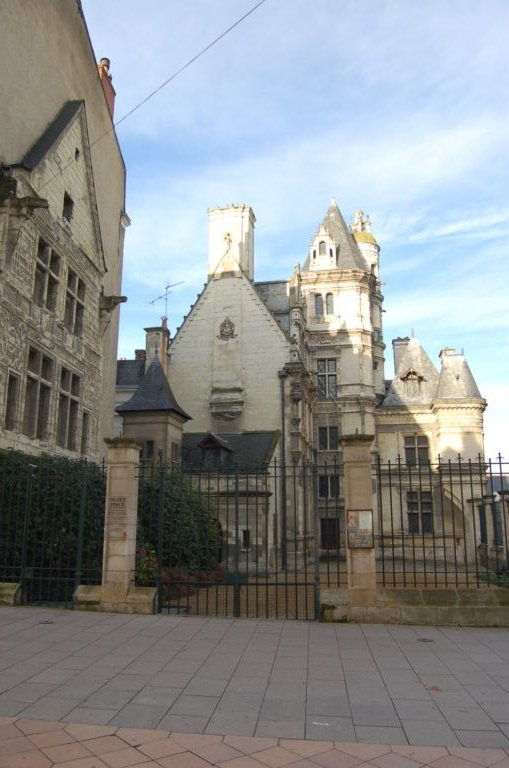
Le logis Pincé in Angers

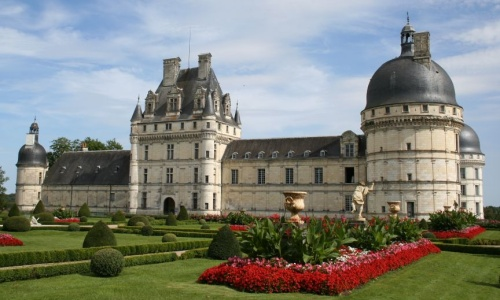
Château de Valençay

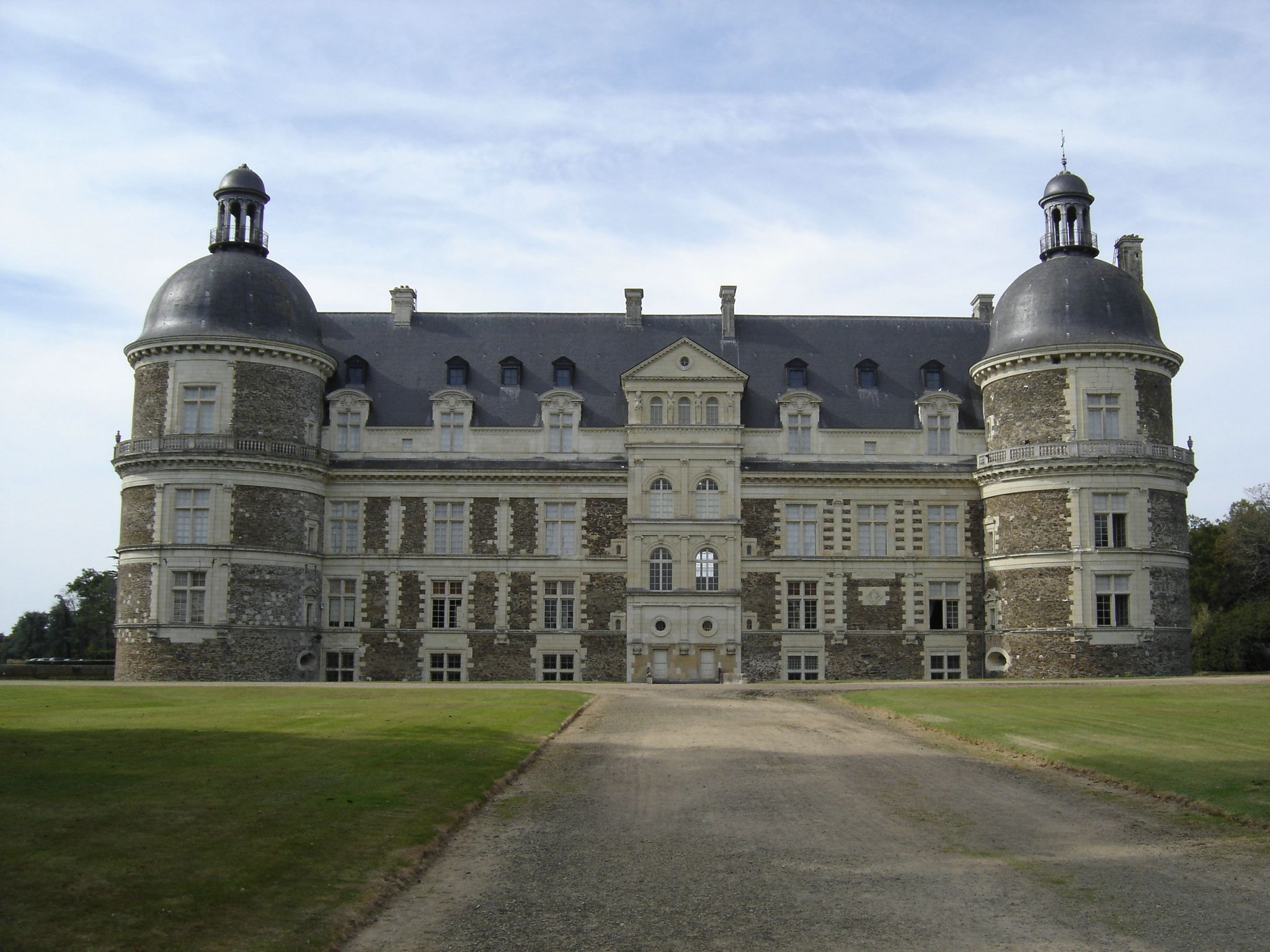
Château de Serrant

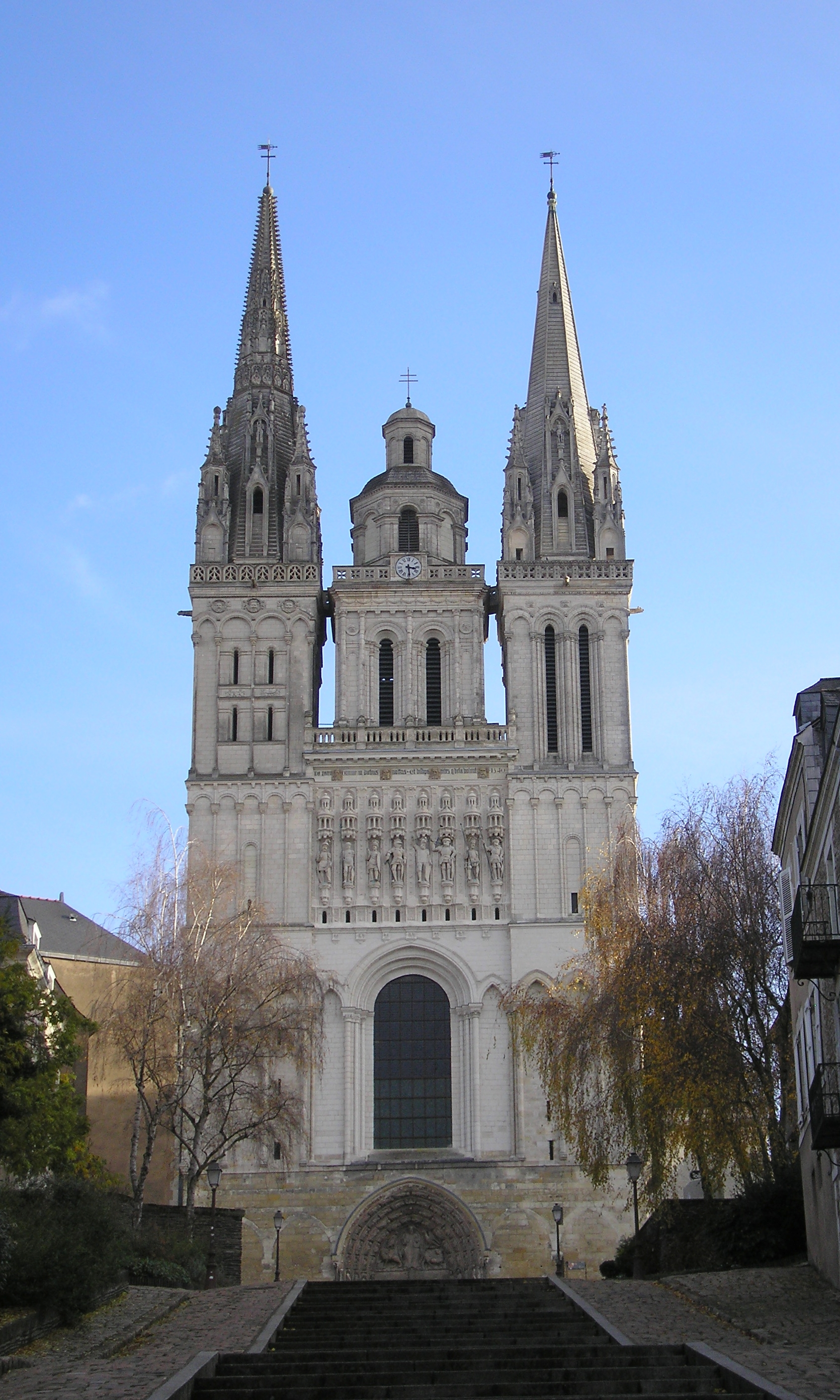
The bell tower of Saint-Maurice d'Angers Cathedral
