= Énemond Massé =

French Jesuit missionary (1575-1646)

Énemond Massé, SJ (3 August 1575 – 12 May 1646) was a French Jesuit missionary, one of the first Jesuits sent to New France.

== Life ==
Nesmes Massé was born 3 August 1575 at Lyon. He was the eldest son of François and Philippe Bica Massé. His father was a baker. On 22 August 1595 he entered the novitiate of the Society of Jesus at Avignon, taking the name Énemond.

After completing his novitiate he taught at the Collège of Tournon from 1597 to 1599, and was also assistant to the bursar. He completed his theological studies at the Collège of Dole in 1602. Sometime after his ordination to the priesthood in 1603, he went to the Collège in Lyon, to serve as minister or bursar. In 1609 he left the province of Lyon to join Father Pierre Coton, the confessor to Henri IV, at the court.

In September 1610 Father Massé was selected to accompany Father Pierre Biard to New France. They left from Dieppe and arrived in Port-Royal (Acadia) (present-day Nova Scotia, Canada) on 22 May 1611. Massé was seasick for much of the voyage. There they spent much time and energy learning the new languages, compiling dictionaries and grammars to help them, and translating the Apostles' Creed, the Lord's Prayer. Massé spent four months living among the Maliseet at the mouth of the Saint John River in order to more quickly learn their language, became ill due to the hardships endured, but recovered. Massé displayed a practical common sense along with carpentry skills which earned him the nickname of Père Utile (Father Useful). When the settlement was close to starvation, Massé constructed a boat and was able to catch an abundance of fish to sustain the settlers.

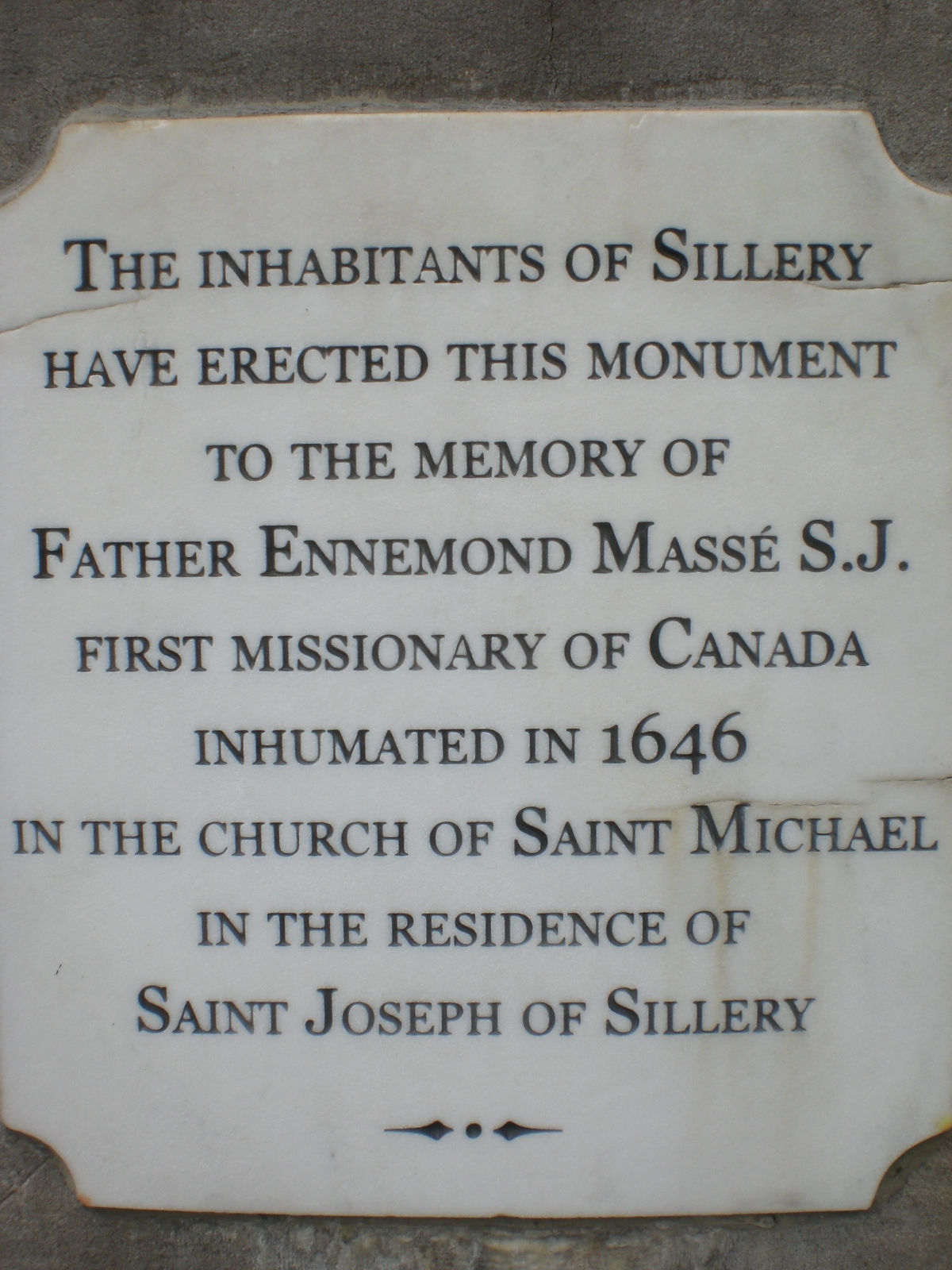
Maison des Jésuites-de-Sillery Plaque

When the mission failed, he and Biard established a new mission at the present Bar Harbor, Maine, which was soon after destroyed by the English. Massé and about a dozen others were set adrift on the sea in an open boat, but succeeded in making St. Marys Bay and then Cape Forchu. There they met Membertou, with whom Massé had stayed while trying to learn the language. At Forchu they were supplied with food. From there they passed Cape Sable Island and arrived at Port Mouton where they learned of two French ships near present-day Halifax. Massé then returned to Saint-Malo.

A year later, Massé was appointed vice-rector of the Royal College at La Flèche. In 1625, he again set sail for Quebec, and built the first Jesuit house at Notre-Dame-des-Anges, Quebec. He remained there until the Surrender of Quebec of 1629 when the French clergy returned to France. He returned a third time in 1633 with Samuel de Champlain and Jean de Brébeuf. As he was in advanced in age, he lived mostly at Sillery, which he built as a reservation for the converts. He died at Sillery, and a monument was erected to his honour at this place on the site of the old Jesuit Church which stood on the bank of the Saint Lawrence River, a short distance above Quebec City. The monument reads, ‘The inhabitants of Sillery Have erected this Monument to the Memory of Pere Énnsemond Massé S.J. First Missionary in Canada Buried in 1646’.

Unlike many of the Jesuits who went to New France in the seventeenth century, Massé left few written accounts of any significance. Biard and Marc Lescarbot, writing on behalf of Jean Biencourt and Charles Biencourt, mention his experiences at Port Royal, Acadia, present day Annapolis Royal, Nova Scotia.

== Notes ==
Attribution
