= Georges Fournier =

French astronomer (1881–1954)

Georges Fournier (21 November 1881 – 1 December 1954) was a French astronomer.

He observed the planet Mars with great detail. In 1909 he was credited with discovering clouds on the planet. During the campaign to observe Mercury between 1924 and 1929, he was the only experienced observer who doubted the deduced rotational period. It later (in 1965) turned out to be incorrect.

A crater on Mars was named in his honor.
