= Pierre de Marbeuf =

French Baroque poet

- Born: 1595 Sahurs, Province of Normandy, Kingdom of France
- Died: 1645 (aged 49–50)
- Genre: poetry
- Literary movement: Baroque
- Notable works: Recueil des Vers de M. de Marbeuf

Pierre de Marbeuf (1595–1645) was a French Baroque poet.

== Biography ==
Pierre de Marbeuf, sieur de Saburs et d'Imare, was born about 1596, probably near Pont-de-l'Arche, in Normandy, where his father was for a time maître des eaux et des forêts. In 1625 his parents resided at Rouen. He seems to have lived for short periods in various parts of France. He left Rouen early for fear of the plague which at that time devastated the city, and established himself in Anjou. Thence he went to Orléans (1619), but must have paid frequent visits to Paris, since at that date he confesses he is in love with a Parisian girl. For her he seems to have given up his studies: "Le désir de luy plaire me fit perdre mes premières estudes," he says. Later he is found in Lorraine and in Savoie. Notwithstanding his travels, he spent a good deal of time at Rouen, for he was crowned at the Palinod in 1617, 1618, and 1620, and he participated in this annual poetic competition in at least two other years. In his last years he retired to his native place to become maître des eaux et forêts.

== Works ==
Pierre de Marbeuf was a fellow-pupil of Descartes at La Flèche and later at Orleans. His literary career opened with Psalterion chrestien and Poésie meslée, Rouen, 1618, which volume was followed by a poem on the marriage of Prince Victor Amadeus I of Savoy in 1619, and this by his Latin verses, Epigrammatum liber, Paris, 1620. His principal volume of poems, Recueil des Vers de M. de Marbeuf, appeared in 1628 at Rouen. Thereafter he published only an ode, Le Portrait de l'homme d'état, Paris, 1633; and no more is heard of him, though he is thought to have been still living in the first years of Louis XIV.

== Bibliography ==
- Hutton, James (1946). The Greek Anthology in France and in the Latin Writers of the Netherlands to the Year 1800. Ithaca: Cornell University Press. pp. 455–456.
