= Antonio Santarelli (Jesuit) =

Italian Jesuit

Antonio Santarelli (1569–1649) was an Italian Jesuit.
