= La Flèche =

- Subprefecture and commune
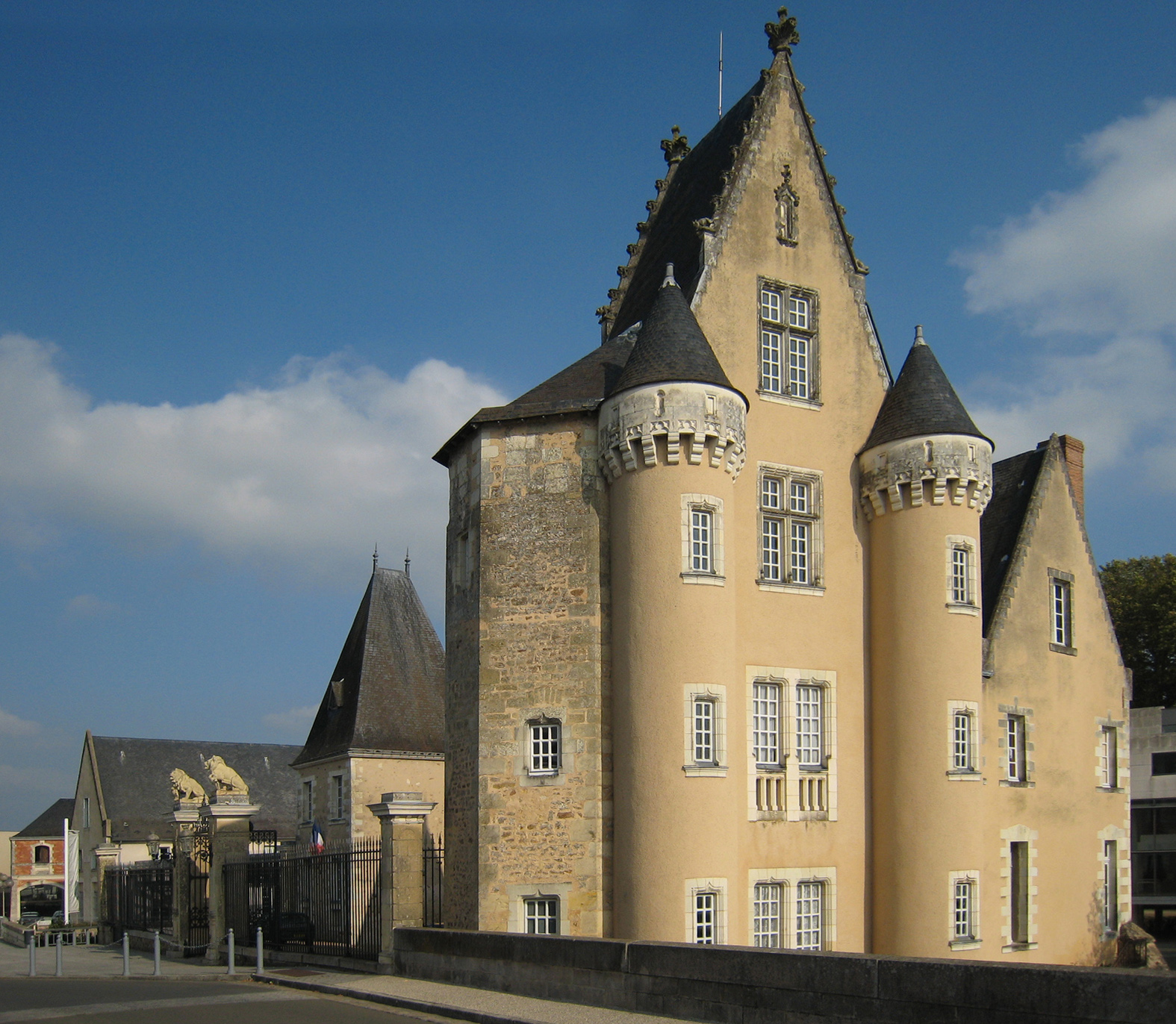
- The town hall of La Flèche

- Coat of arms
- Location of La Flèche
- Location within France Location within Pays de la Loire
- Coordinates: 47°41′45″N 0°04′29″W
- Country: France
- Region: Pays de la Loire
- Department: Sarthe
- Arrondissement: La Flèche
- Canton: La Flèche
- Intercommunality: Pays Fléchois

Government
  - Mayor (2020–2026): Nadine Grelet-Certenais
- Area^{1}: 74.21 km^{2} (28.65 sq mi)
- Elevation: 33 m (108 ft)
- Highest elevation: 103 m (338 ft)
- Lowest elevation: 23 m (75 ft)
- Population (2023): 14,947
  - Density: 201.4/km^{2} (521.7/sq mi)
- Time zone: UTC+01:00 (CET)
  - Summer (DST): UTC+02:00 (CEST)
- INSEE/Postal code: 72154 /72200
- Website: www.ville-lafleche.fr
- ^{1} French Land Register data, which excludes lakes, ponds, glaciers > 1 km^{2} (0.386 sq mi or 247 acres) and river estuaries.

La Flèche (French pronunciation: [la flɛʃ]) is a town and commune in the French department of Sarthe, in the Pays de la Loire region in the Loire Valley. It is the sub-prefecture of the South-Sarthe, the chief district and the chief city of a canton, and the second most populous city of the department. The city is part of the community of communes of the Pays La Flèche. The inhabitants of the town are called Fléchois.

The Prytanée National Militaire is located in La Flèche.

== Geography ==
La Flèche is located on the Loir River and is also on the Greenwich Meridian. It is located halfway between Le Mans (45 km) and Angers.

== City communes ==
- Sainte-Colombe
- Saint-Germain-du-Val
- Verron

== Neighboring municipalities ==
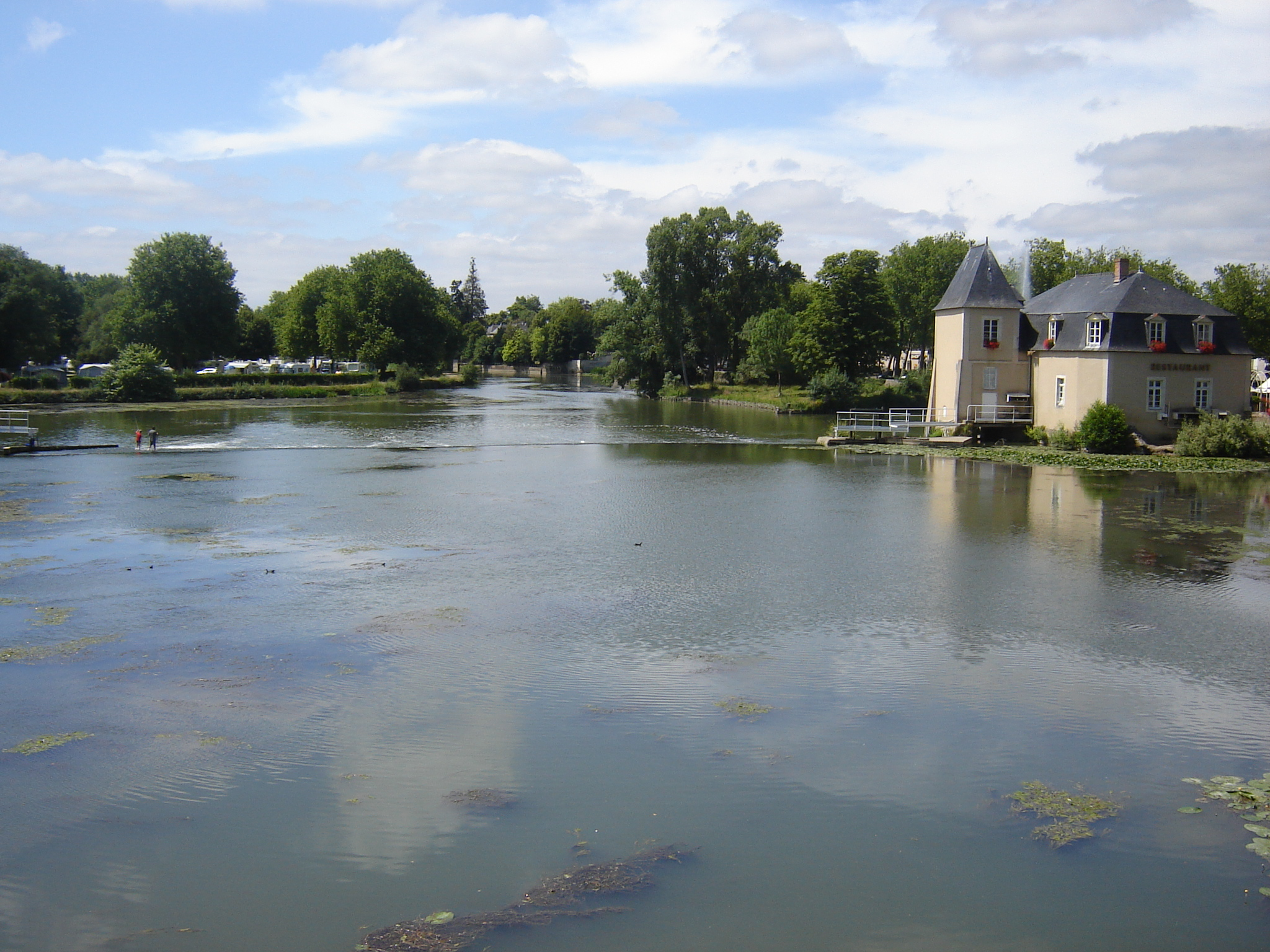
Le Loir à La Flèche

- Bazouges Cré sur Loir
- Crosmières
- Villaines-sous-Malicorne
- Bousse
- Clermont-Créans
- Mareil-sur-Loir
- Thorée-les-Pins
- Baugé-en-Anjou (Maine-et-Loire)

== History ==
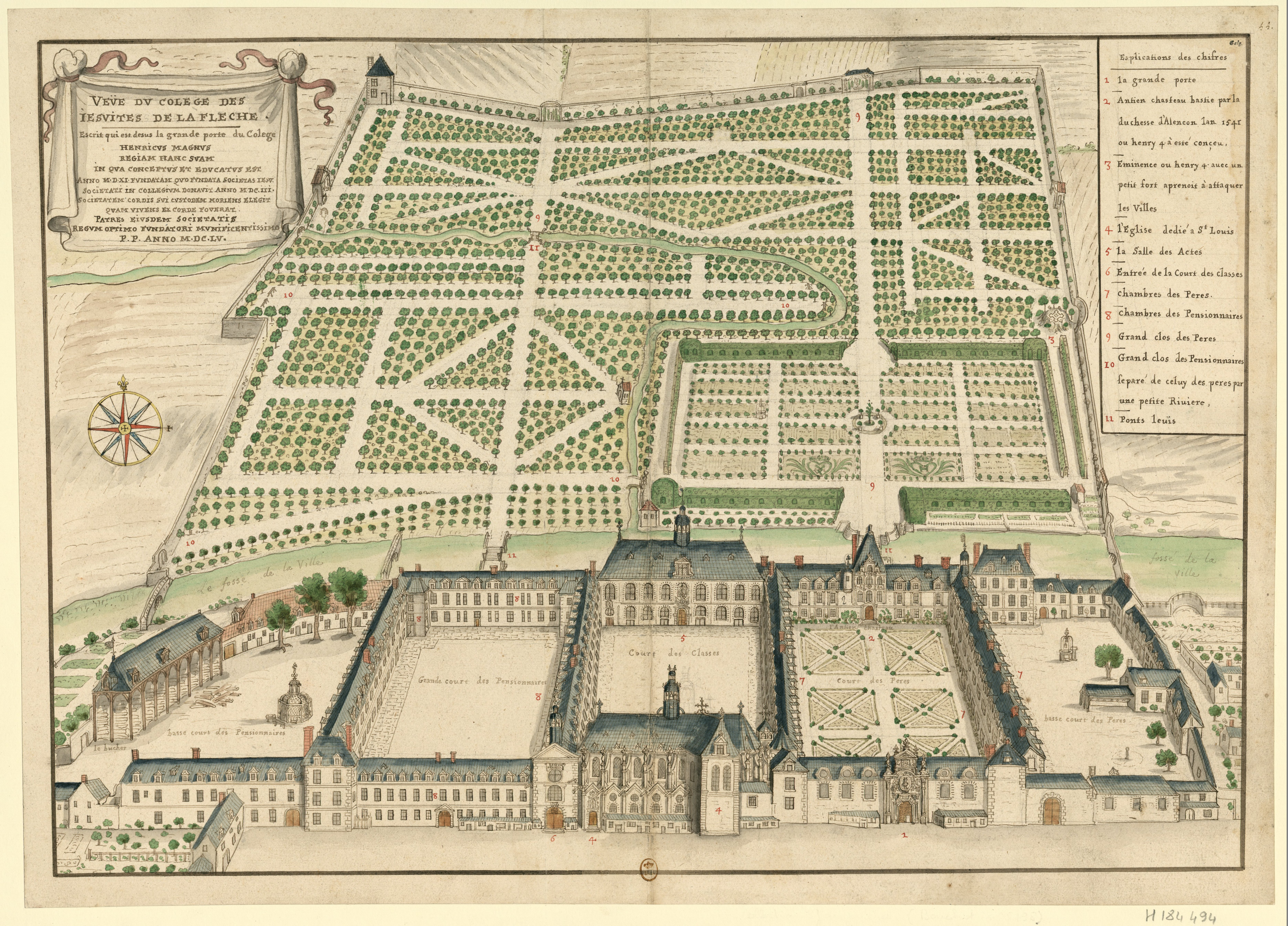
Collège La Flèche (1695)

The origin of the name La Flèche is uncertain; the word flèche means "arrow" in French. Historian Jacques Termeau, in La Flèche Book (No. 9, pp. 5–11), has documented several hypotheses which most likely are related to the ancient Latin name Fixa meaning "stuck", that is to say "rock stuck in the ground". In fact La Flèche was a city situated on the border of Maine and Anjou. An ancient megalith boundary would have given this the name Fixa that can be found in early manuscripts in full as Fixa andegavorum, often translated later as La Flèche in Anjou, but more precisely meaning the boundary of Anjou.

In the Middle Ages, La Flèche was a parish of the Diocese of Angers and as such formed an integral part of the province of Anjou and more specifically the Upper Anjou, also called Maine Angevine.

Jean de la Flèche (c. 1030 – c. 1097), also known as Jean de Beaugency, succeeded his father as the second Seigneur (lord) of la Flèche, where he held the original castle. He was a younger son of Lancelin I de Beaugency lord of Beaugency. Jean was granted lands in Yorkshire, England by William the Conqueror. He is the progenitor of the Fletcher family. He was succeeded by his son, Elias I, Count of Maine, a grandfather of King Henry II of England.

In 1343, salt became a state monopoly by order of King Philip VI of Valois, who established the Gabelle, the tax on salt. The Anjou was among the regions of "high salt tax" and contained sixteen special tribunals or "salt warehouses", including La Fleche.

La Flèche was at the head of Angevine seneschalship under the Old Regime: the Seneschal of La Flèche was dependent on the principal Seneschal of Angers.

In 1603, Guillaume Fouquet de la Varenne, Lord of La Flèche and then Sainte-Suzanne (Mayenne) and Angers, and a friend of Henry IV of France, contributed to the enhancement and diversification of functions of the Angevine city. Henry IV founded a college (the Royal College of La Flèche) in which management was entrusted to the Jesuits. They were expelled in 1762 and the college became a "cadet school" (the École de cadets) in 1764, a pre-military academy of Paris.

Also in the seventeenth century, settlers from La Flèche, under the leadership of Jérôme le Royer de la Dauversière, founded Montreal, Quebec.

In 1790, during the creation of the French departments, the entire northeastern part of the Anjou region, including La Flèche, Le Lude and Château-du-Loir, was attached to the new department of Sarthe.

On 8 December 1793, during the War in the Vendée, the city was stormed by the Vendéens at the battle of La Flèche.

In 1808, Napoleon built the military academy.

In 1866, the town of Sainte-Colombe was integrated with La Flèche.

On 1 January 1965, La Flèche absorbed the communes of Saint-Germain-du-Val and Verron.

== Coat of arms ==
Gules, an arrow in pale, the point upwards between two towers argent, a chief azure, three fleurs de lis or.

== Urban environment and green spaces ==
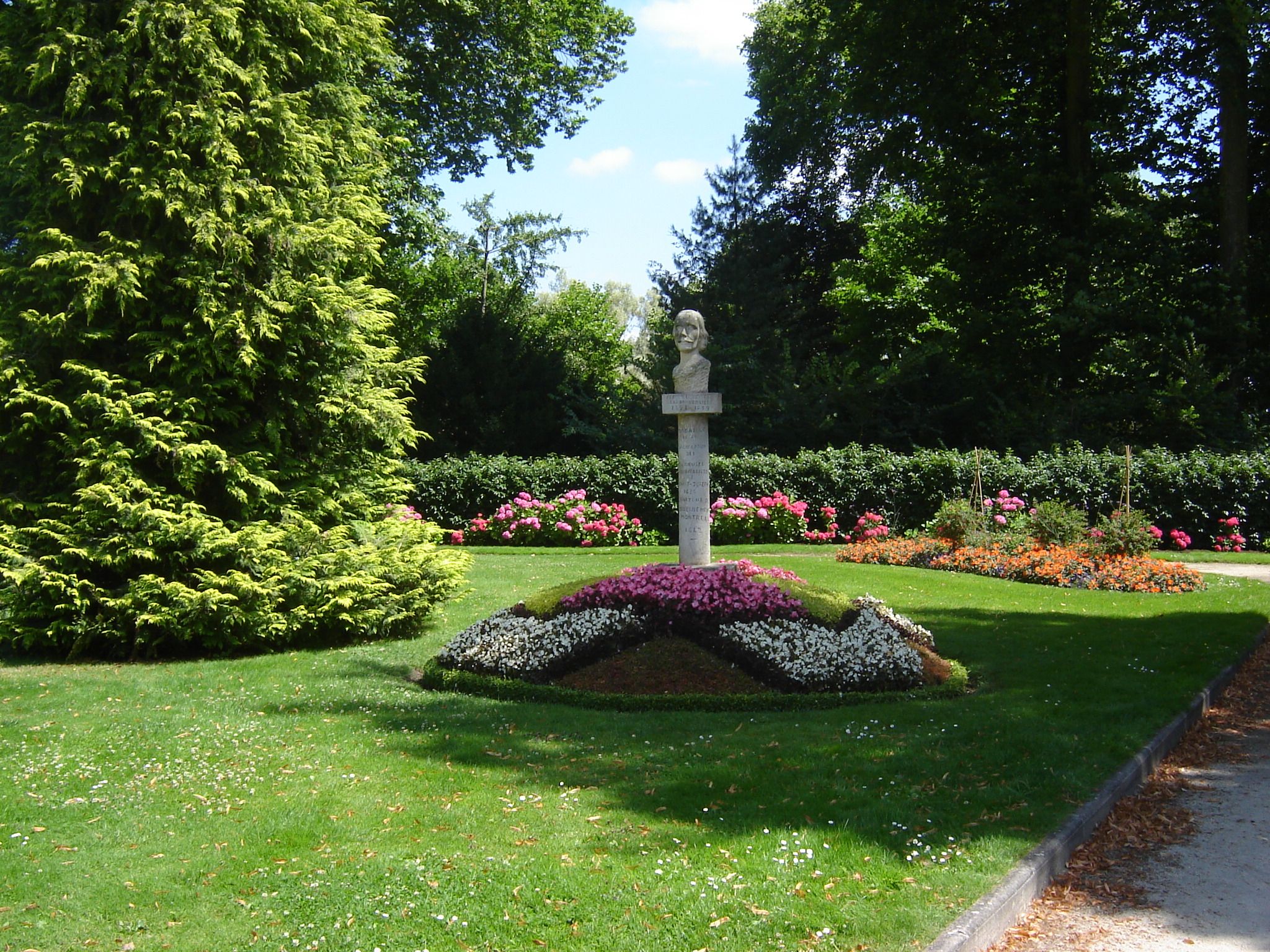
Carmes' Park

La Flèche and the Loire Valley have been certified Cities and Regions of Art and History since 2006.

The Parc des Carmes in La Flèche has improved the quality of its flowers as part of the town's participation in French Villages and Towns in Bloom rankings, attaining a three flower rating since 1997.

The quality of garbage collection in the communes of the La Flèche region has been recognized through the 2007 'Qualitri label, a label of the ADEME, which is a first in Sarthe. The city has also put into service municipal vehicles running natural gas.

Since July 2008, La Flèche, in partnership with the town of Cré, has had a regional nature reserve, the first in the Sarthe. This preserves the alluvial marsh area and varied biodiversity present on the reserve that extends over 65 hectares.

Parc des Carmes, situated at the foot of the town hall, next to the old gardens of the château of Fouquet de la Varenne, allows visitors to explore and discover a few animals as well as an aviary. This park has some remarkable trees, including Araucaria and a young Ginkgo biloba ("the thousand crowns tree"). There is also a path from the park to the lakes of Monnerie, along the Loir, under the shade of the trees.

== Economy ==
The La Flèche economy is organized as follows:

- 65% commercial,
- 22% in industry,
- 7% in construction,
- 6% in agriculture.

The print tradition is still alive in La Flèche with the factory Brodard and Taupin (group CPI), a leading European manufacturer of paperback books.

== Demographics ==
With 14,947 inhabitants (as of 2023), La Flèche is the second most populous commune of the Sarthe department.

Historical population

Year	Pop.	±% p.a.
1793	4,897	—
1800	5,099	+0.58%
1806	5,098	−0.00%
1821	5,387	+0.37%
1831	6,421	+1.77%
1836	6,440	+0.06%
1841	7,009	+1.71%
1846	6,831	−0.51%
1851	7,048	+0.63%
1856	7,147	+0.28%
1861	7,077	−0.20%
1866	9,292	+5.60%
1872	9,341	+0.09%

Year	Pop.	±% p.a.
1876	9,405	+0.17%
1881	9,424	+0.04%
1886	9,841	+0.87%
1891	10,249	+0.82%
1896	10,477	+0.44%
1901	10,519	+0.08%
1906	10,663	+0.27%
1911	10,830	+0.31%
1921	9,522	−1.28%
1926	9,842	+0.66%
1931	10,115	+0.55%
1936	10,101	−0.03%
1946	11,293	+1.12%

Year	Pop.	±% p.a.
1954	11,275	−0.02%
1962	11,092	−0.20%
1968	13,768	+3.67%
1975	14,516	+0.76%
1982	14,752	+0.23%
1990	14,953	+0.17%
1999	15,241	+0.21%
2007	15,258	+0.01%
2012	14,963	−0.39%
2017	14,956	−0.01%
2023	14,947	−0.01%

Source: EHESS and INSEE

== Local gastronomy ==
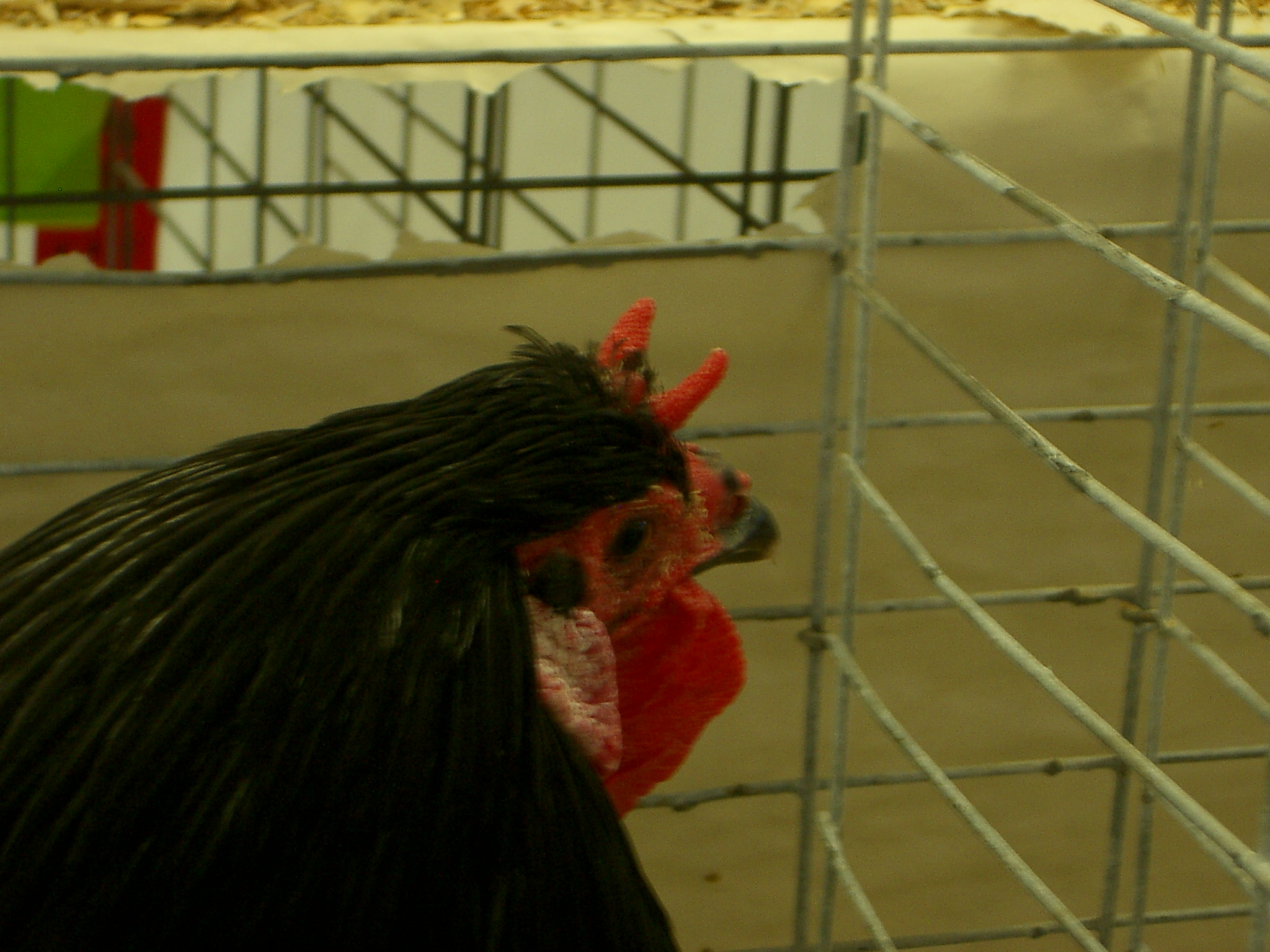
La Flèche "Black Chicken"

The La Flèche breed of chicken from the towns of La Flèche and Malicorne-sur-Sarthe is known for its fine flesh, and once made the reputation of La Flèche.

Other regional specialties include macarons with lemon, violet or rose; the "Prytanéens" chocolate-flavored nougat with crushed praline, so named in reference to Prytanée National Militaire; and "Fiches", small confectionery formed of piles of dark chocolate, chocolate orange and finely crushed nougat. Jasnières 6 wine is produced with the Chenin blanc grown on the slopes of the Loire and Anjou and accompanies the tasting of potted meat or refined goat.

== Notable people connected with the city ==
- Elias I, Count of Maine second lord of La Flèche.
- Jean Picard or "Father Picard" (21 July 1620 - 12 July 1682): astronomer and priest.
- Lazare de Baïf (1496–1547): diplomat, priest, poet and humanist.
- Jacques Bouillault: naturalist and founder of La Flèche Zoo in 1946.
- Jean de la Flèche: first lord of La Flèche.
- Jérôme le Royer de la Dauversière, Sieur de La Dauversière (1597–1659): the man behind the departure of the settlers for the foundation of a city on the island of Montreal, "Ville Marie", which has since become Montreal.
- Jean-Baptiste Lemire (1867–1945): composer and conductor buried at La Flèche.
- Léo Delibes (1836-1891): composer, author of the opera Lakmé and the ballets Sylvia and Coppélia.
- Felix John Bayle (1843–1920): lecturer at the National Prytanée military schools in the city, he also restored and managed the town band. He also composed music: a "cantata Leo Delibes' and many operas.
- René Descartes (1596–1650): philosopher, mathematician, and scientist. He attended the Royal College Henri IV.
- Jean-Baptiste-Louis Gresset (1709–1777): poet and satirist, professor at the College Henri IV. He left the Jesuits later.
- Louis-Adrien Lusson (1788-1864): architect, designer, born in La Flèche. He created and managed the paintings in the dome of the Little Theatre, which he entrusted to the artists of the Royal Academy of Music.
- Pierre-Claude Fontenai (1683–1742): a historian, he died in La Flèche.
- David Hume (1711–1776): British philosopher. He wrote A Treatise of Human Nature in La Flèche between 1735 and 1737.
- Marie Pape-Carpantier (1815–1878): organizer of the first kindergartens.
- Joseph Gallieni (1849-1916): General of the First World War, a student at Prytanée.
- Pierre-Félix Delarue: architect of the Little Theatre in 1839 and the sub-prefecture in 1861. He also designed many castles in the area at that time.
- Paul-Henri-Benjamin d'Estournelles de Constant (1852–1924): diplomat, MP, senator, and winner of the Nobel Peace Prize in 1909.
- Paul Gauthier (1914–2002): theologian and humanist.
- Balinec Yan (1928–2009): writer and poet.
- Alain Pellegrini (1946 -): Major General.
- Marquis de Turbilly (1717-1776): agronomist.
- Guillaume Fouquet de la Varenne (1560-1616): Officer and friend of Henry IV.
- Anne-Marie Chassaigne, also known as Liane de Pougy (1869-1950): dancer and courtesan of the Belle Époque.
- Francis Theodore Latouche: former mayor, died in 1861. A mausoleum funded by public subscription was erected in 1862, representing the city of La Flèche mourning the disappeared. This monument by the sculptor Eugène-Louis Lequesne is in the cemetery of St. Thomas.
- Joseph-Étienne Richard (1761-1834), deputy at the time of the French Revolution
- Joseph Sauveur (born in La Flèche in 1653 - died in Paris in 1716): French scientist, inventor of physical acoustics and professor at the College de France.
- Michel Virlogeux (1946-): architect involved in the completion of the Millau Viaduct.
- Adrien Fainsilber, architect of the town hall of La Flèche and of the City of Science and Industry in Paris.
- Jean Vilain, born 3 August 1836, in Poitiers, and died 30 April 1863, during the Battle of Cameron, a French officer of the Foreign Legion, hero of the Mexican campaign. Student of Prytanée of La Flèche and Knight of the Legion of Honor. He was appointed patron of the 2006-2007 cycle of the 4th Battalion of the Special Military School of the Schools of Saint-Cyr-Coëtquidan, and patron to promote the 1999 - 2001 Corniche Brutionne of the National Military Prytanée.
- Mathurin Jousse (1575-1645), known for writing, between1627 et 1642, three treatises of construction on locksmithing, carpentry and stereotomy: La fidelle ouverture de l’art de serrurier, Le theatre de l’art de charpentier and Le secret d’architecture. These works are among the first of their type in France.

== International relations ==
La Flèche is twinned with:

- Obernkirchen (Germany),: Obernkirchen (9,744 inhabitants) Since 1968.
- (United Kingdom) Chippenham (England) (approximately 45,620 inhabitants) Since 1982.
- Markala (Mali) (approximately 56,644 inhabitants).
- Złotów (Poland) (approximately 18,468 inhabitants).
- St. Lambert (Canada) (21,772 inhabitants).

== Monuments and historical buildings ==
=== Civil heritage ===
==== Prytanée National Militaire ====
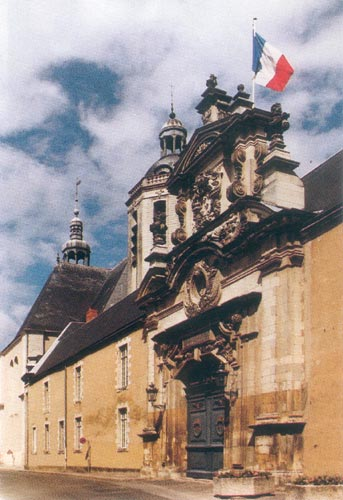
Prytanée National Militaire

During the 16th century, Françoise, duchess of Alençon, and grandmother to the future Henry IV established a castle in La Flèche, where Antoine de Bourbon, king of Navarre, and his wife Jeanne d'Albret, future parents of Henry IV, resided in 1552. The castle was given to the Jesuits by Henri IV in 1604 to found the Collège royal Henri le Grand, in order "to select and train the best minds of the time".

In 1764 following the expulsion of the Jesuits the school was transformed by Louis XV and Choiseul into a military institution (the École de cadets) designed to train young cadets for admission to the École Militaire. The buildings now accommodate one of six military schools in France. The buildings are arranged around three courtyards which are dominated by the imposing stature of the Church of St. Louis (1607). The work followed a plan developed by Louis Métezeau with a row of courtyards roughly the same size. The architect was Étienne Martellange. The work was completed in 1655 with the construction of the gate of honour with the pediment and the bust of Henri IV.

==== Château des Carmelites ====
The castle, now the City Hall, was originally the mid-eleventh-century fortress that defended the river crossing. Jean de Beaugency and his son Hélie, the future Count of Maine, expanded and strengthened it towards the end of the eleventh century. It was a wooden fortress sitting on an island and spanning two neighboring islands, and was the subject of several sieges in the twelfth century to the fifteenth century. The castle was rebuilt in 1450, and the ruins of the keep of this period are still standing, with marks left by arrows on the drawbridge and battlements.

In the seventeenth century, Louis XIII donated it to the Carmelites who had established and transformed the city. The main building and cloister date from this period. During the Revolution, it became private property of the family Bertron Auger who transformed it again. Having become mayor in 1909, he was the victim of a fire in 1919. It was rebuilt with a different style in the years that followed. The castle is now part of the wedding hall of the town of La Flèche, and has two temporary exhibition rooms.

==== La Flèche Zoo ====
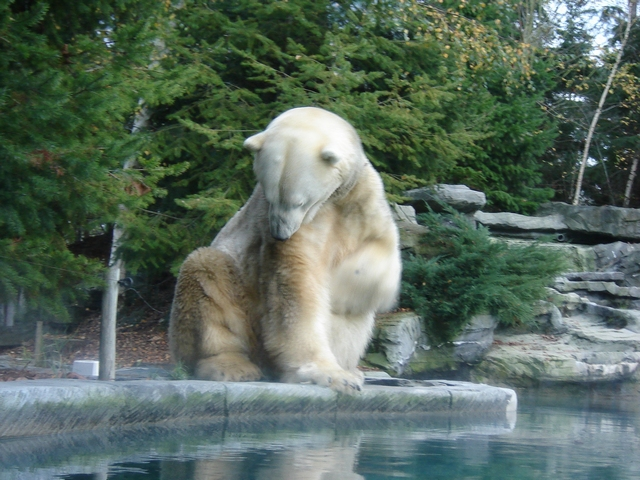
Zoological Park of La Flèche

Created in 1946 by Jacques Bouillault, a naturalist, La Flèche Zoo is the oldest private park in France. It includes 1,200 animals of 150 species on 14 hectares (35 acres). This is the premiere tourist destination of the department of Sarthe, with over 300,000 entries per year. The zoo has participated in the European Endangered Species Programme (EEP) since 1989. Many new exhibits are added every year. In 2008 the zoo showed the extremely rare white lions of Kruger, of which there are only 200 specimens in the world.

==== The Pavilion Fouquet de la Varenne ====
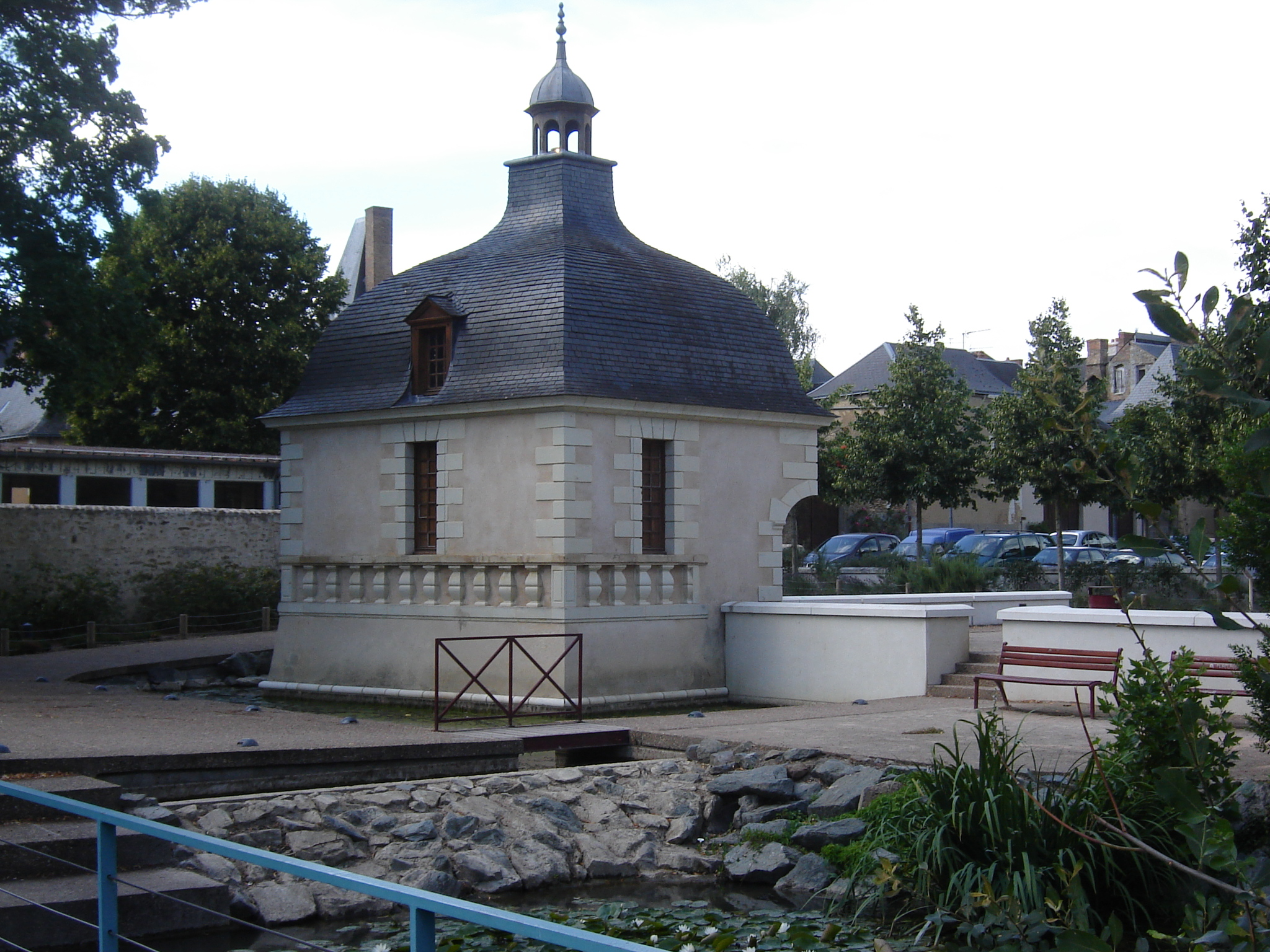
Pavillon Fouquet de La Varenne La Flèche

Fouquet de la Varenne Pavilion is in downtown La Flèche. The Pavilion was built in the early seventeenth century. The exterior of the Pavilion may be seen throughout the year; however it is open to visitors only on certain occasions. This pavilion is the only building remaining of the ancient castle of La Flèche.

==== The Bruere mill ====
Nestled in the hollow of the Loir, the mill of the Bruere allows visitors to discover how the force of the river powers a mechanism via a large wheel, producing flour, electricity and refreshing ice blocks. This is the last mill in France to produce ice.

==== Lakes of La Monnerie ====
These vast bodies of water of some fifty hectares are equipped with a bathing area that combines water recreation, fitness and nature discovery. The site of the Monnerie is a mosaic of lakes and meadows situated in a bend of the Loire with a rich biodiversity. Many animal and plant species coexist in these places: herons, reed warbler, coot, hare, ermine, green frog, frog, dragonfly, snail, reed, iris, water crowfoot, and water-plantain make this site a popular place for walkers and naturalists. The preservation of these wetlands helps maintain biodiversity. The lakes are the result of the operation of a gravel pit, and wet meadows. Each winter, over thirty migratory species (e.g. greylag goose, pochard, teal) find shelter here.

==== The hall and the theater of the Halle au Blé (nicknamed "The Candy Box") ====
In the Middle Ages there was already a wooden market hall, while the square held the grain market. The halls were rebuilt twice in the eighteenth century. In 1737, they were built of stone and then expanded in 1772 to establish the town hall. Closed to the public since 1947, it was restored to "authenticity" in 1998 and was recently renamed as the site of the Corn Exchange. This was rewarded in 2000 by the Rubans du Patrimoine.

In 1839, a small Italian theater was added to the first floor. The architect who drew up the plans for the "little theater" was Pierre-Félix Delarue, who also designed many castles in the region in the second half of the nineteenth century. This is his best-known building of La Flèche in the sub-prefecture. The decoration of the room and its dome were planned by Adrien-Louis Lusson, an architect and designer, born in La Fleche on 4 August 1788. He entrusted the work to decorative painters for the Royal Academy of Music. This theater has retained much of its original decor, except for the paintings of the false dome, redesigned in 1923.

Since March 1999, performances in the cultural season are scheduled by the Entertainment and Arts Carroi. This rare Italian-French structure is open to public tours during the Heritage Days and the summer season. For groups, the tourist office of the La Flèche Region organizes tours.

==== The museum and chapel of Providence ====
Discovery of the personal effects of Françoise Jamin, founder in the early nineteenth century of the Institute of the Daughters of Saint-Cœur de Marie, told the story of Providence. The chancel and chapel are a unique in the region, with murals of the nineteenth century.

==== The manor of Blottière ====
Dates from the fifteenth and sixteenth centuries. It is a former hunting manor of William Fouquet de la Varenne. It can be visited only during the summer.

==== Former Hotel Dieu in La Flèche ====
In the Museum of the Hospitallers of Hôtel-Dieu de Montreal, her namesake city, stands the ancient steps of the Hotel-Dieu in La Flèche. Jérôme Le Royer, lord of La Dauversière, installed the first sisters in the hospital "Maison Dieu" of La Flèche in 1636. In 1641, he entrusted the task to Jeanne Mance to build a hospital in New France, in Ville-Marie. In 1659, she returned to France with the first three sister carers for Ville-Marie. A century and a half later, during the French Revolution, the nuns were expelled from La Flèche. The place was then converted into police station, court and prison.

The staircase of the Hotel Dieu was walled in and forgotten. Only during the demolition and restoration of the old prison in 1953 was the oak staircase rediscovered. The town of La Flèche offered it to Montreal as a symbol of the long alliance between the two cities. Over 300 years after the arrival of the sisters in Montreal, the staircase resides in the lobby of the museum of the Hospitallers of the Hôtel-Dieu de Montreal. The Hotel-Dieu itself is no longer visible today, separated from the former police station, having been turned into housing, and the present court. The old prisons disappeared as they were subsumed into it.

==== Former prisons ====
The first prisons were located in La Flèche, in the Marché-au-Blé, next to the Présidial, created in 1595 by Henri IV. At the beginning of the nineteenth century they were moved to the bottom of the dead-end street, St. Thomas, on the premises that had been those of the priory of the same name.

The unhealthy state of the prisons was denounced 7 August 1807, by Rocher Desperrés, a board member, who was concerned about the detention conditions of detainees. Half a century later, the prisoners were again entitled to complain as they were deprived of water because of the erection of the statue of Henri IV, in Pillory Square, which had involved the removal of water pipes. As no one passed the budget at the town hall, the prisoners remained in this state for several years.

On 30 May 1933, a presidential decree abolished 14 prisons including that of La Flèche. On 16 June of that year, prisoners were transferred to Le Mans. Between 1937 and 1939, during the Spanish Civil War, the old prison was occupied at various times by Spanish refugees (men, women and children). World War II led to the reopening of the prison to hold political prisoners. The prison was finally abolished in 1953. The door of the priory, in the middle of the dead end street, Saint-Thomas, was removed in early 1958.

==== Religious heritage ====
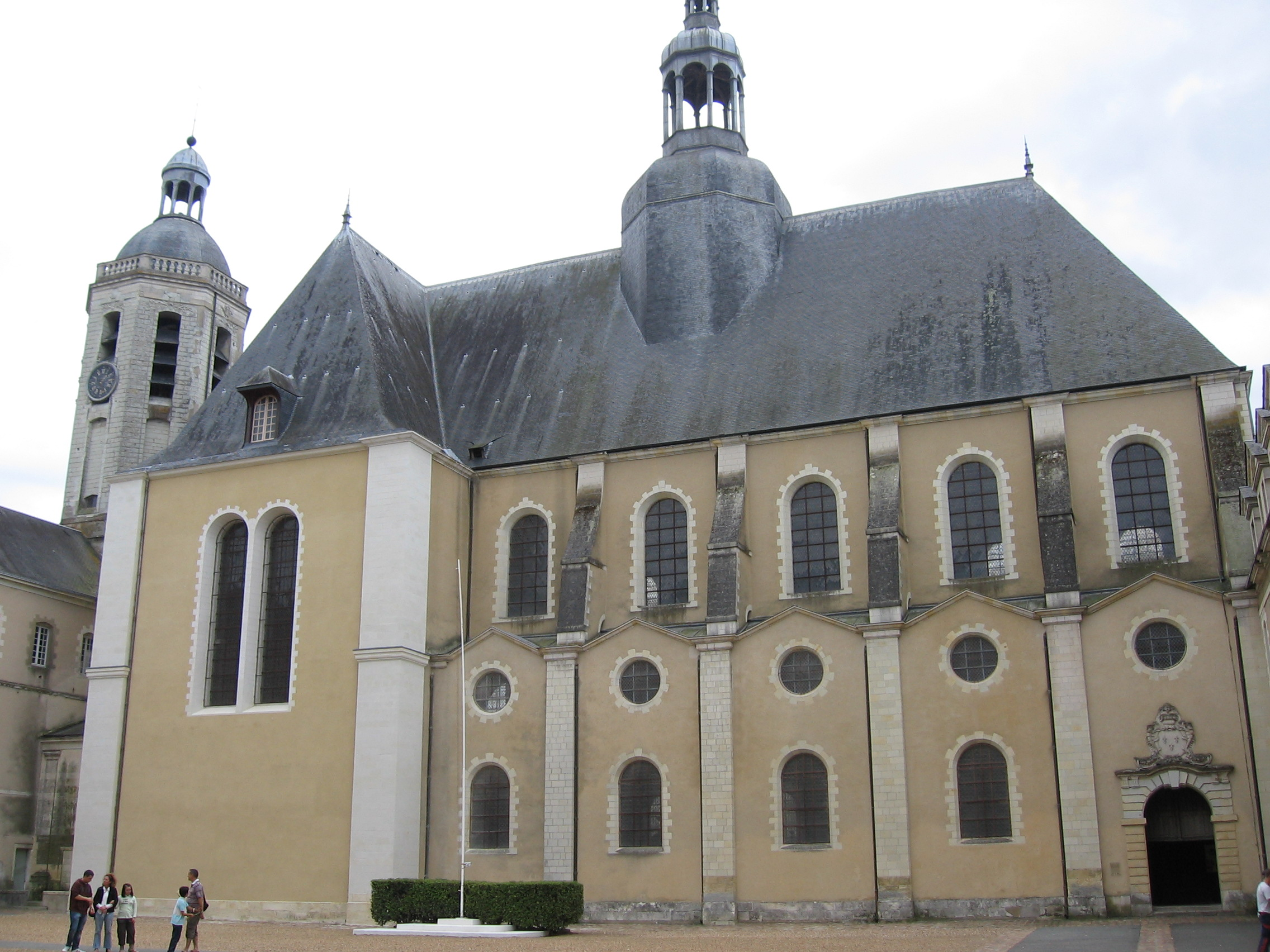
La Flèche, Eglise St Louis (du collège jésuite)

La Flèche has six major religious buildings:

- The Church of St. Thomas (early twelfth century and rebuilt in the fifteenth and eighteenth centuries), the main church of the city;
- The Church of Sainte-Colombe, freely accessible;
- The Church of St. Germain du Val (eleventh and twelfth centuries), freely accessible;
- Church Verron, freely accessible;
- Chapel of Our Lady of Virtues (no celebrations, but open to the public) is the oldest religious building in the city (Roman times);
- The Church of St. Louis is located within the confines of the Prytanée National Militaire.

== Climate ==
Climate data for La Flèche (Thorée-les-Pins) (1991–2020 normals, extremes 1961–present)
Month	Jan	Feb	Mar	Apr	May	Jun	Jul	Aug	Sep	Oct	Nov	Dec	Year
Record high °C (°F)	17.0 (62.6)	21.5 (70.7)	25.5 (77.9)	28.5 (83.3)	32.6 (90.7)	40.0 (104.0)	40.5 (104.9)	39.0 (102.2)	36.0 (96.8)	30.2 (86.4)	22.0 (71.6)	18.0 (64.4)	40.5 (104.9)
Mean daily maximum °C (°F)	8.2 (46.8)	9.5 (49.1)	13.1 (55.6)	16.3 (61.3)	19.9 (67.8)	23.5 (74.3)	25.7 (78.3)	25.7 (78.3)	22.0 (71.6)	17.1 (62.8)	11.9 (53.4)	8.7 (47.7)	16.8 (62.2)
Daily mean °C (°F)	5.3 (41.5)	5.8 (42.4)	8.5 (47.3)	11.0 (51.8)	14.4 (57.9)	17.7 (63.9)	19.6 (67.3)	19.5 (67.1)	16.2 (61.2)	12.7 (54.9)	8.4 (47.1)	5.8 (42.4)	12.1 (53.8)
Mean daily minimum °C (°F)	2.4 (36.3)	2.1 (35.8)	3.8 (38.8)	5.6 (42.1)	8.8 (47.8)	11.9 (53.4)	13.5 (56.3)	13.3 (55.9)	10.4 (50.7)	8.3 (46.9)	5.0 (41.0)	2.8 (37.0)	7.3 (45.1)
Record low °C (°F)	−17.2 (1.0)	−13.4 (7.9)	−11.5 (11.3)	−5.0 (23.0)	−2.4 (27.7)	1.5 (34.7)	3.0 (37.4)	4.5 (40.1)	1.3 (34.3)	−4.5 (23.9)	−9.0 (15.8)	−15.8 (3.6)	−17.2 (1.0)
Average precipitation mm (inches)	70.9 (2.79)	57.0 (2.24)	54.0 (2.13)	54.2 (2.13)	58.2 (2.29)	50.6 (1.99)	55.5 (2.19)	52.4 (2.06)	60.6 (2.39)	75.4 (2.97)	74.6 (2.94)	81.2 (3.20)	744.6 (29.31)
Average precipitation days (≥ 1.0 mm)	12.2	10.3	10.3	9.4	9.6	7.7	6.9	7.8	7.9	11.3	11.8	12.5	117.6
Source: Meteociel

== See also ==
- Communes of the Sarthe department
- Saint-Louis church, La Flèche
