= Wildlife Angel =

French wildlife protection NGO

- Formation: June 2015
- Type: Non-profit
- Location: Strasbourg, France
- Region served: France (Strasbourg) and Africa (Namibia, Burkina Faso, Benin, Guinea, Democratic Republic of Congo
- Key people: Sergio Lopez

Wildlife Angel is a wildlife protection non-governmental organization (NGO) based in Strasbourg (France). Its three main objectives are to protect wildlife, to protect rangers and to fight poaching by intervening in national parks, private reserves and working with other non-governmental organizations (NGO). Wildlife Angel intervenes directly in the field with rangers in charge of animal protection.

The organization is active in Namibia, Burkina Faso and Niger. The organisation gained recognition after a documentary shot in 2016, Une Saison dans la Savane, featured them prominently.

== History ==
Wildlife Angel was founded by Sergio Lopez in June 2015. It is an association of local rights. One month after its creation, the NGO's first action occurred in Namibia, in Etosha National Park. They trained rangers and taught them how to work against poachers more efficiently. Wildlife Angel also intervened in Benin, Burkina Faso, and Nigeria.

In 2017, Wildlife Angel became involved in trying to stop Chinese zoos from importing young bonobos from the Democratic Republic of Congo for trading purposes.

Jean-Marc Gancille, co-founder of Darwin Eco-System in Bordeaux, is the vice president of Wildlife Angel. Sergio Lopez and the three veterans who went into the field with him protect the animals with words and provide onsite military training to African park rangers. According to Lopez, anti-poaching requires military skills as well as knowledge of animal behavior and movement. Wildlife Angel's services are free. When deciding to intervene, they pay attention to the values of the rangers and their respect for human and animal rights. Lopez stated, "In our training sessions, we do not say, you will kill poachers. Our first commitment is to instill a deep respect for human rights, including those of poachers.”

The organization noted that prevention of poaching may come into conflict with the necessity for subsistence hunting in poor countries. It states that the main challenge for African countries impacted by poaching is to deal with education, energy and the economy. Each of these deeply impact wildlife.

== Projects ==
The main projects are:

=== Operation Burkina One ===
In southern Burkina Faso, Pama is threatened by gold panning. Miners' use of cyanide and mercury is a serious threat to water supplies and wildlife. To protect the area, the Burkinabe government created the first brigade of the Corps of Eco-guards to be sent to the threatened area after training by Wildlife Angel, to keep miners away from the reserves.

=== Operation in W National Park – Niger ===
The W National Park is threatened by poaching committed by gangs from neighboring countries. Anti-poaching groups are not sufficiently trained and their lack of equipment and money makes their actions inefficient. The objective of Wildlife Angel is to enable them to protect the wildlife in the park. In order to do so, the organization submitted a training plan, adapted according to the eco-guards’ skills. The principal issue that Wildlife Angel faces is to find reliable funding.

=== Arrow Operation – Namibia ===
Situated in a private reserve, the area is becoming increasingly populated by rhinoceros. Operators trained by Wildlife Angel in 2015 are working at other reserves or have returned to South Africa. The challenge of the mission was to find more workers and equipment.

In 2018, the main objectives of the project were to obtain a helicopter and/or a drone; to create a more organized, stronger team of operators; and to strengthen tactical first aid with more equipment.

=== Harambee Mission awareness campaign for local populations ===
One or more members are responsible for explaining the reason for their presence to local communities. They are primarily active in schools, presenting the objectives of wildlife protection to the children. These members raise awareness and talk about the animals the children may encounter so that they can have a better understanding of their behaviors.

== Partners ==
Wildlife Angel continues to operate thanks to partners that support the project. It is supported by the World Wide Fund for Nature and International Fund for Animal Welfare, among others.

HornNam, Next Generation, and Closing the Gap are the main partners of Wildlife Angel in Namibia. This umbrella organization merged in 2015 giving birth to C.O.V.E.R (Conserving Our Valuable Elephant and Rhino).

- HornNam unites private reserve managers gathering more than 85% of the Namibian Rhinoceros.
- Next Generation specializes in territorial surveillance by drones.
- Closing the Gap mainly focuses on managing rangers on the field.

Wildlife Angel works with indirect partners including NGOs, media, institutions and companies such as:

- Zoo de la Flèche (a French Zoo) supports the organization, notably through the operation 'Ranger for a Day', which allows visitors to the zoo to experience the daily lives of rangers. This zoo supplied the caretaker team to Namibia for the shooting of the documentary “Une Saison dans la Savane.”
- W National Park in Niger receives frequent interventions, as the home to the greatest biodiversity of Western Africa.
- The NGO Lola Yo Bonobo. This NGO welcomes orphan bonobos. They partner to provide anti-poaching education and training.

== Documentary ==
The documentary "Une Saison dans la Savane", filmed over three weeks in October 2017, follows five wildlife professionals from the Zoo de la Flèche (a veterinarian, the director, head caretaker, elephant caretaker, and fawn trainer) who were enabled by Wildlife Angel to join rangers in Namibia during their rhino poaching work. The documentary is a season of 6 episodes. The goal was to raise awareness amongst youth about the imperatives of the current situation.
