= Bousse =

Bousse or Boussé may refer to:

- Boussé, a town in Kourwéogo, Burkina Faso
- Bousse, Moselle, a commune in the Moselle département, France
- Bousse, Sarthe, a commune in the Sarthe département, France
