= Bazouges-sur-le-Loir =

- Part of Bazouges Cré sur Loir
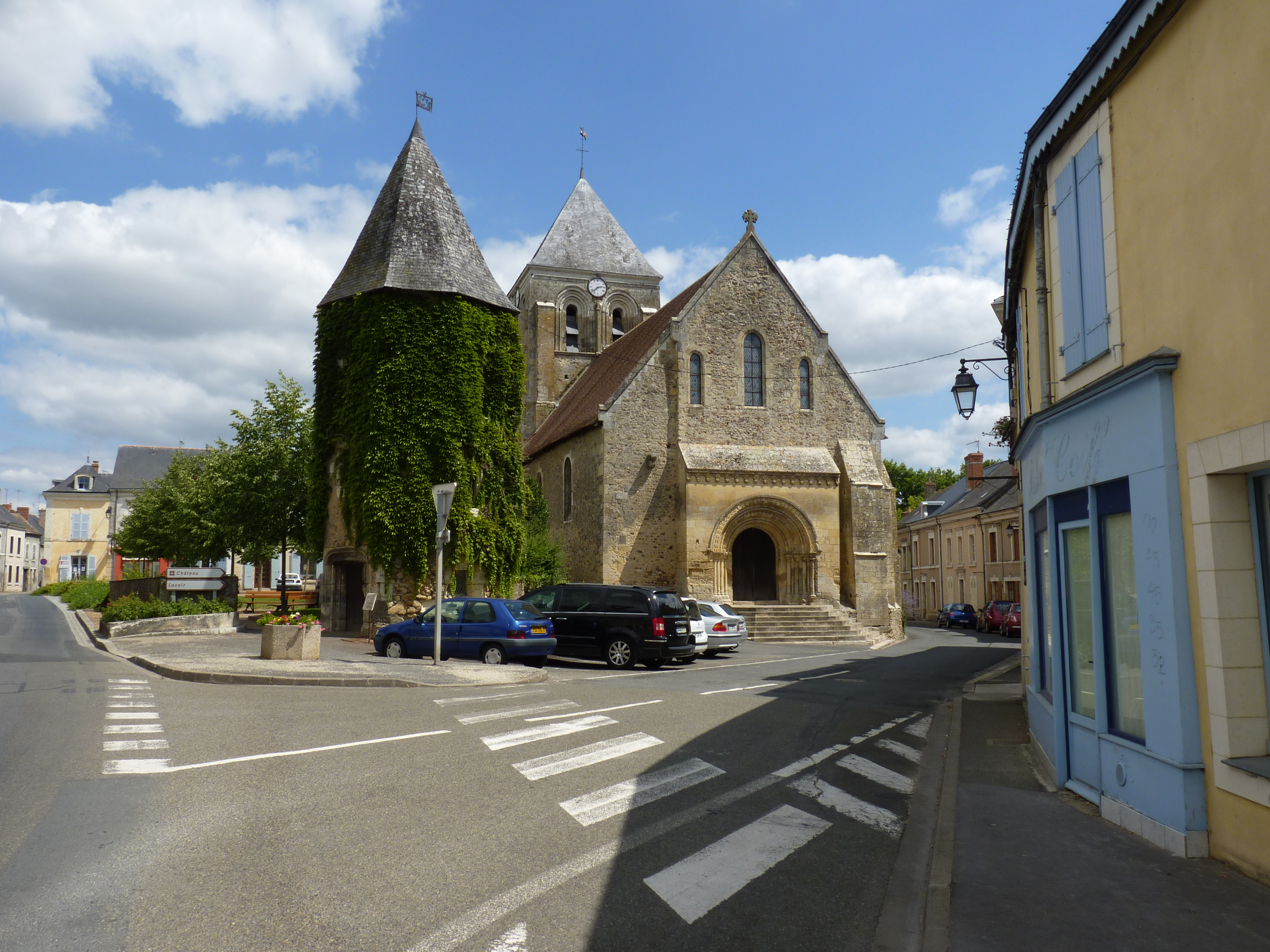
- Church of Saint-Aubin

- Coat of arms
- Location of Bazouges-sur-le-Loir
- Location within France Location within Pays de la Loire
- Coordinates: 47°41′25″N 0°10′07″W
- Country: France
- Region: Pays de la Loire
- Department: Sarthe
- Arrondissement: La Flèche
- Canton: La Flèche
- Commune: Bazouges Cré sur Loir
- Area^{1}: 29.90 km^{2} (11.54 sq mi)
- Highest elevation: 99 m (325 ft)
- Lowest elevation: 22 m (72 ft)
- Population (2022): 1,188
  - Density: 39.73/km^{2} (102.9/sq mi)
- Demonym(s): Bazougeois, Bazougeoise
- Time zone: UTC+01:00 (CET)
  - Summer (DST): UTC+02:00 (CEST)
- Postal code: 72200
- ^{1} French Land Register data, which excludes lakes, ponds, glaciers > 1 km^{2} (0.386 sq mi or 247 acres) and river estuaries.

Bazouges-sur-le-Loir (French pronunciation: [bazuʒ syʁ lə lwaʁ], literally Bazouges on the Loir) is a former commune in the Sarthe department in the region of Pays de la Loire in north-western France. On 1 January 2017, it was merged into the new commune Bazouges Cré sur Loir. Its population was 1,188 in 2022.

== See also ==
- Communes of the Sarthe department
