= Ligron =

- Commune
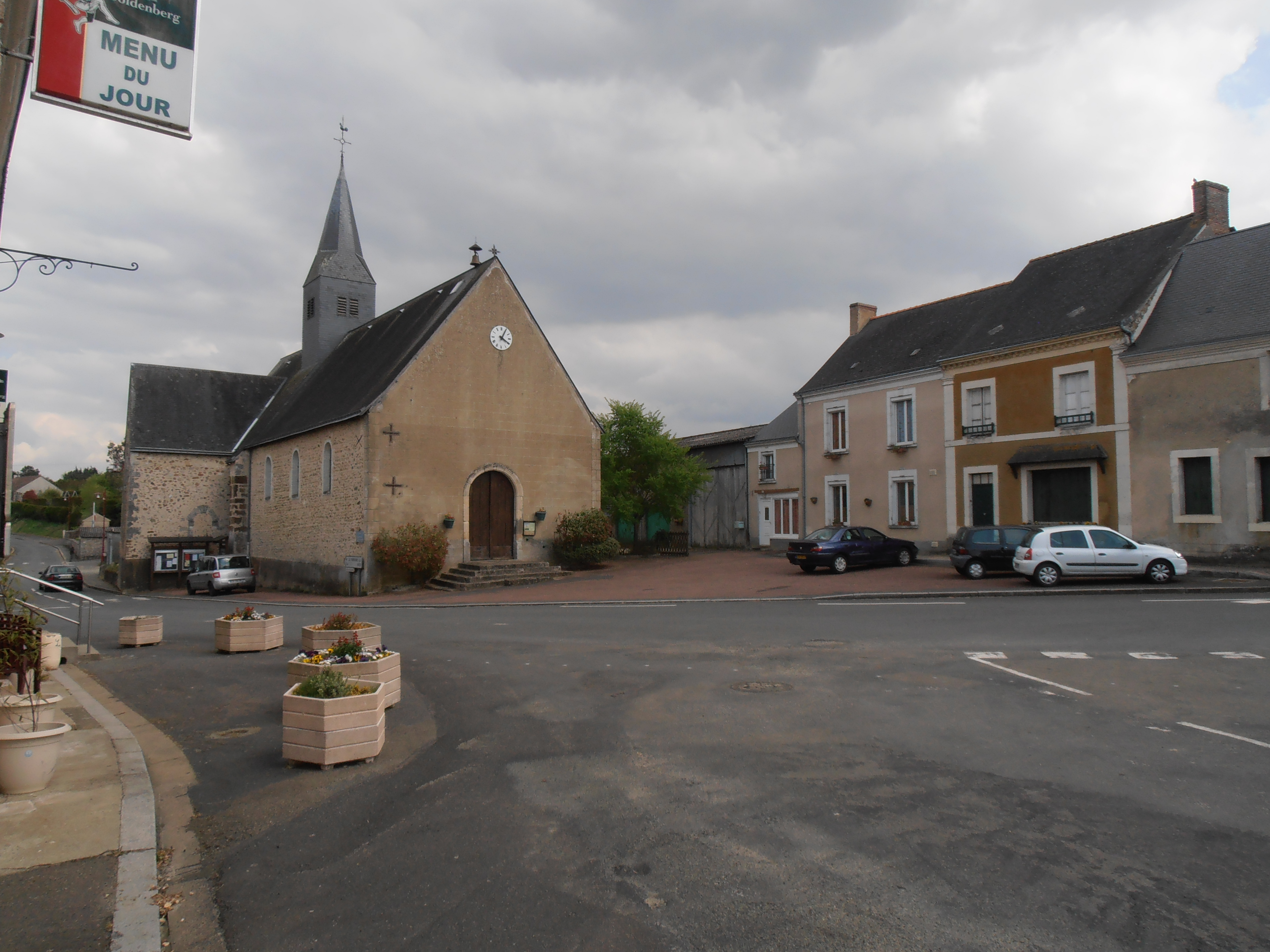
- The village centre and the church
- Location of Ligron
- Location within France Location within Pays de la Loire
- Coordinates: 47°46′24″N 0°00′25″E
- Country: France
- Region: Pays de la Loire
- Department: Sarthe
- Arrondissement: La Flèche
- Canton: La Flèche
- Intercommunality: Pays Fléchois

Government
  - Mayor (2020–2026): Philippe Biaud
- Area^{1}: 13.5 km^{2} (5.2 sq mi)
- Population (2023): 494
  - Density: 36.6/km^{2} (94.8/sq mi)
- Demonym(s): Ligronnais, Ligronnaise
- Time zone: UTC+01:00 (CET)
  - Summer (DST): UTC+02:00 (CEST)
- INSEE/Postal code: 72163 /72270
- ^{1} French Land Register data, which excludes lakes, ponds, glaciers > 1 km^{2} (0.386 sq mi or 247 acres) and river estuaries.

Ligron (French pronunciation: [liɡʁɔ̃]) is a commune in the Sarthe department in the region of Pays de la Loire in north-western France. Ligron was famous for its pottery ovens from the 13th century which were still in use until the late 19th century.

== Sights ==
- Church of Sainte-Maire-and-Saint-Anne (12th, 16th and 17th century).
- Manor House La Sansonniere (13th, 17th and 19th century).

== Population ==
Historical population
Year	Pop.	±% p.a.
1968	406	—
1975	351	−2.06%
1982	337	−0.58%
1990	338	+0.04%
1999	358	+0.64%
2007	453	+2.99%
2012	490	+1.58%
2017	504	+0.57%
2023	494	−0.33%
Source: INSEE

== See also ==
- Communes of the Sarthe department
