= Cré-sur-Loir =

- Part of Bazouges Cré sur Loir
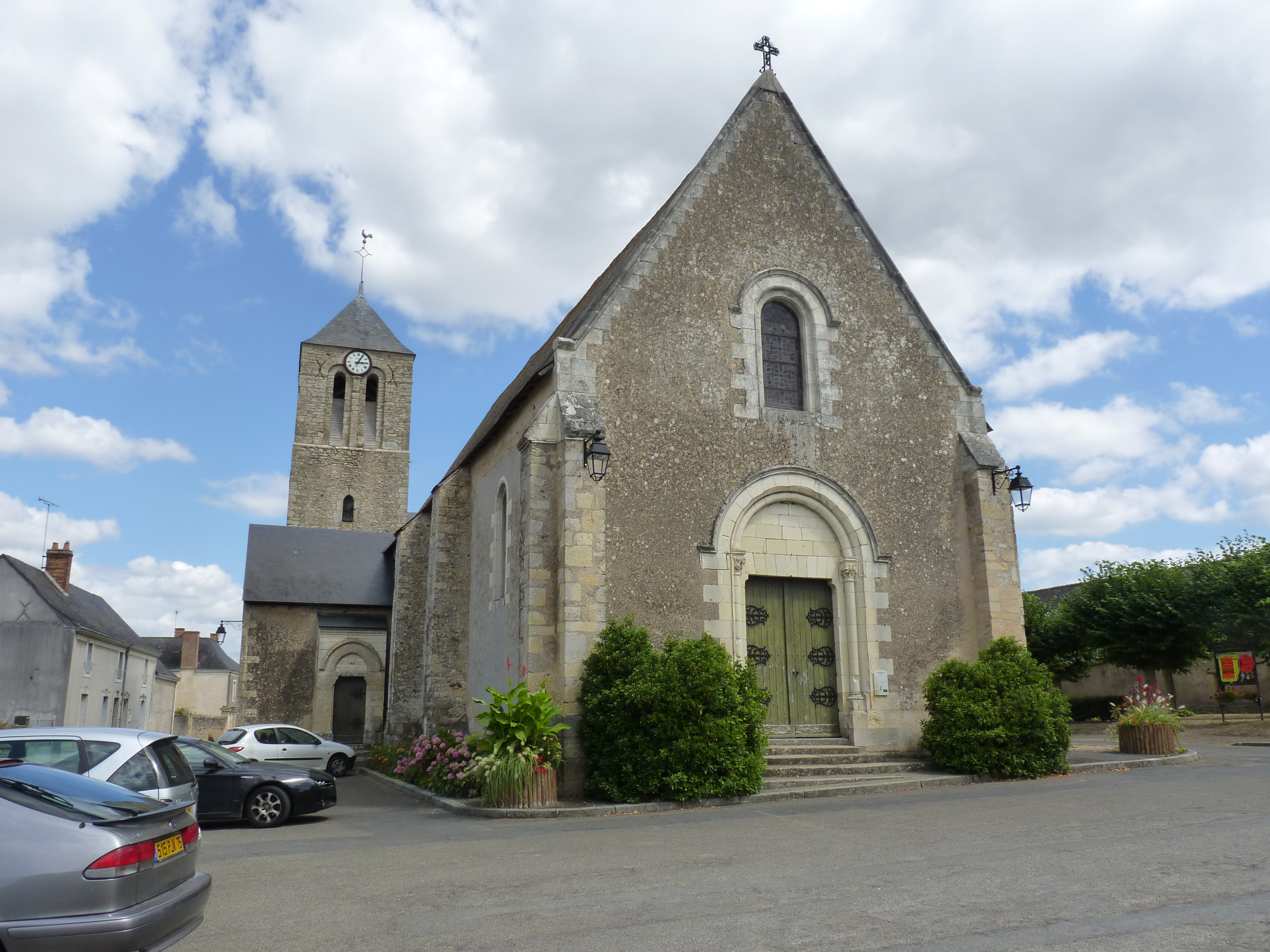
- The church
- Location of Cré-sur-Loir
- Location within France Location within Pays de la Loire
- Coordinates: 47°40′41″N 0°09′23″W
- Country: France
- Region: Pays de la Loire
- Department: Sarthe
- Arrondissement: La Flèche
- Canton: La Flèche
- Commune: Bazouges Cré sur Loir
- Area^{1}: 17.19 km^{2} (6.64 sq mi)
- Population (2022): 758
  - Density: 44.1/km^{2} (114/sq mi)
- Demonym(s): Créacier, Créacière; Créassier, Créassière
- Time zone: UTC+01:00 (CET)
  - Summer (DST): UTC+02:00 (CEST)
- Postal code: 72200
- ^{1} French Land Register data, which excludes lakes, ponds, glaciers > 1 km^{2} (0.386 sq mi or 247 acres) and river estuaries.

Cré-sur-Loir (French pronunciation: [kʁe syʁ lwaʁ], literally Cré on Loir; before 2014: Cré) is a former commune in the Sarthe department in the Pays de la Loire region in north-western France. On 1 January 2017, it was merged into the new commune Bazouges Cré sur Loir. Its population was 758 in 2022.

== See also ==
- Communes of the Sarthe department
