= La Chapelle-d'Aligné =

- Commune
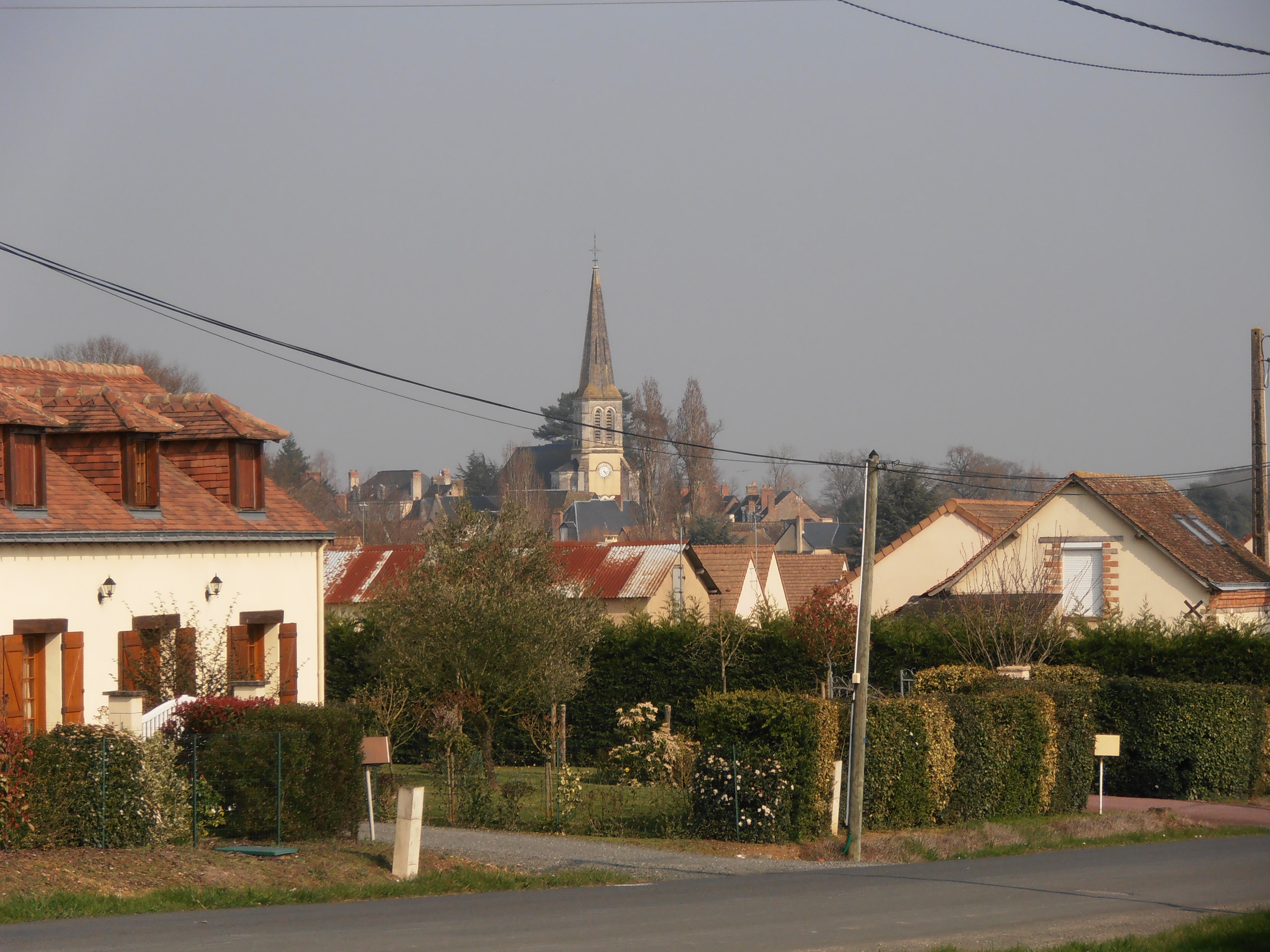
- View of the Chapelle-d'Aligné
- Location of La Chapelle-d'Aligné
- Location within France Location within Pays de la Loire
- Coordinates: 47°44′00″N 0°14′00″W
- Country: France
- Region: Pays de la Loire
- Department: Sarthe
- Arrondissement: La Flèche
- Canton: La Flèche
- Intercommunality: Pays Fléchois

Government
  - Mayor (2020–2026): Philippe Deslandes
- Area^{1}: 33.04 km^{2} (12.76 sq mi)
- Highest elevation: 51 m (167 ft)
- Lowest elevation: 51 m (167 ft)
- Population (2023): 1,729
  - Density: 52.33/km^{2} (135.5/sq mi)
- Demonym(s): Chapellois, Chapelloise
- Time zone: UTC+01:00 (CET)
  - Summer (DST): UTC+02:00 (CEST)
- INSEE/Postal code: 72061 /72300
- ^{1} French Land Register data, which excludes lakes, ponds, glaciers > 1 km^{2} (0.386 sq mi or 247 acres) and river estuaries.

La Chapelle-d'Aligné (French pronunciation: [la ʃapɛl daliɲe]) is a commune in the Sarthe department in the Pays de la Loire region in north-western France.

== See also ==
- Communes of the Sarthe department
