= Arthezé =

- Commune
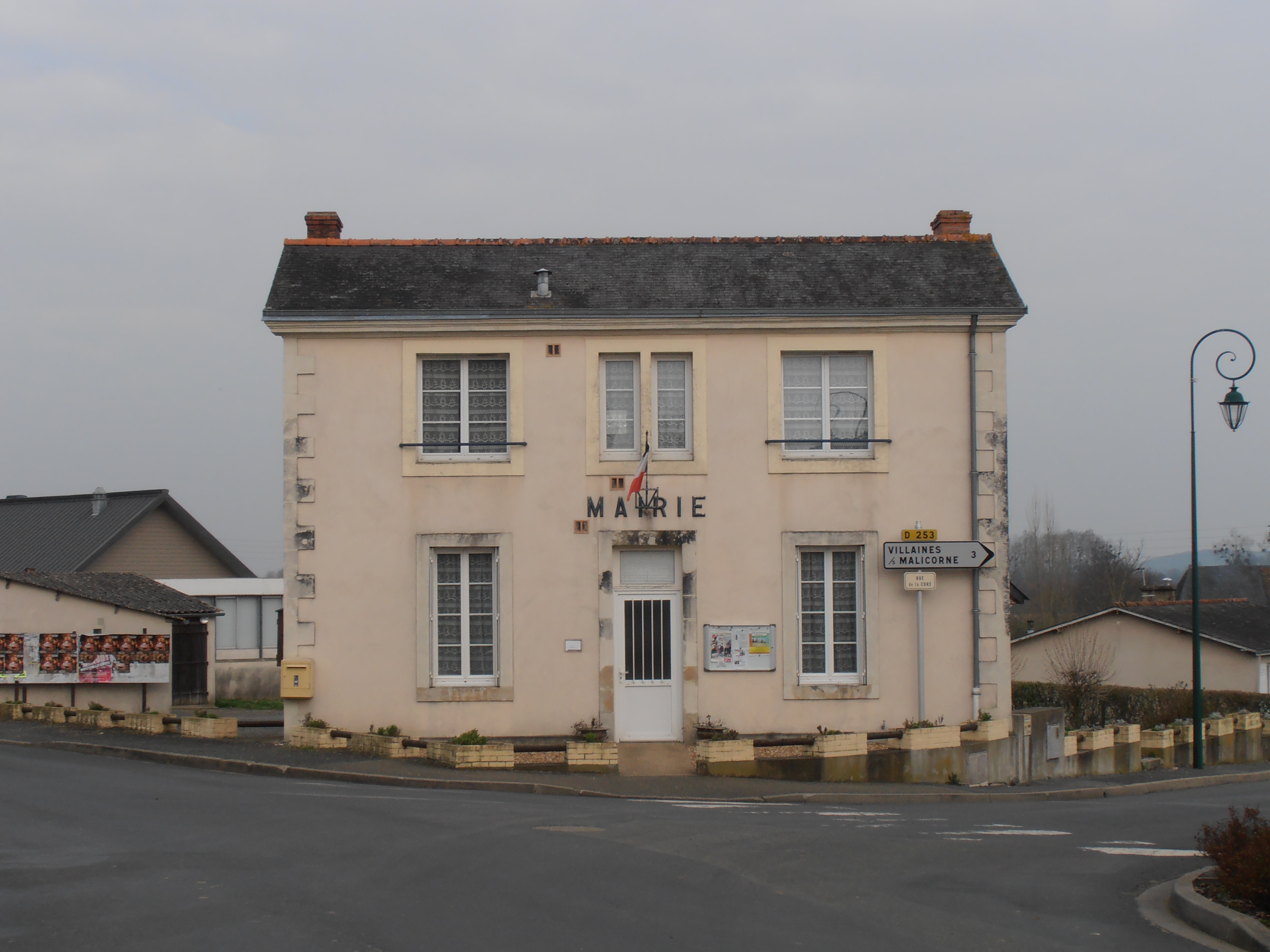
- Arthezé town hall
- Location of Arthezé
- Location within France Location within Pays de la Loire
- Coordinates: 47°47′16″N 0°07′06″W
- Country: France
- Region: Pays de la Loire
- Department: Sarthe
- Arrondissement: La Flèche
- Canton: La Flèche
- Intercommunality: CC Pays Fléchois

Government
  - Mayor (2020–2026): Sylvain Poirrier
- Area^{1}: 8.65 km^{2} (3.34 sq mi)
- Highest elevation: 85 m (279 ft)
- Lowest elevation: 32 m (105 ft)
- Population (2023): 350
  - Density: 40/km^{2} (100/sq mi)
- Time zone: UTC+01:00 (CET)
  - Summer (DST): UTC+02:00 (CEST)
- INSEE/Postal code: 72009 /72270
- ^{1} French Land Register data, which excludes lakes, ponds, glaciers > 1 km^{2} (0.386 sq mi or 247 acres) and river estuaries.

Arthezé (French pronunciation: [aʁtəze]) is a commune in the Sarthe department and Pays de la Loire region of north-western France.

== See also ==
- Communes of the Sarthe department
