= Courcelles-la-Forêt =

- Commune
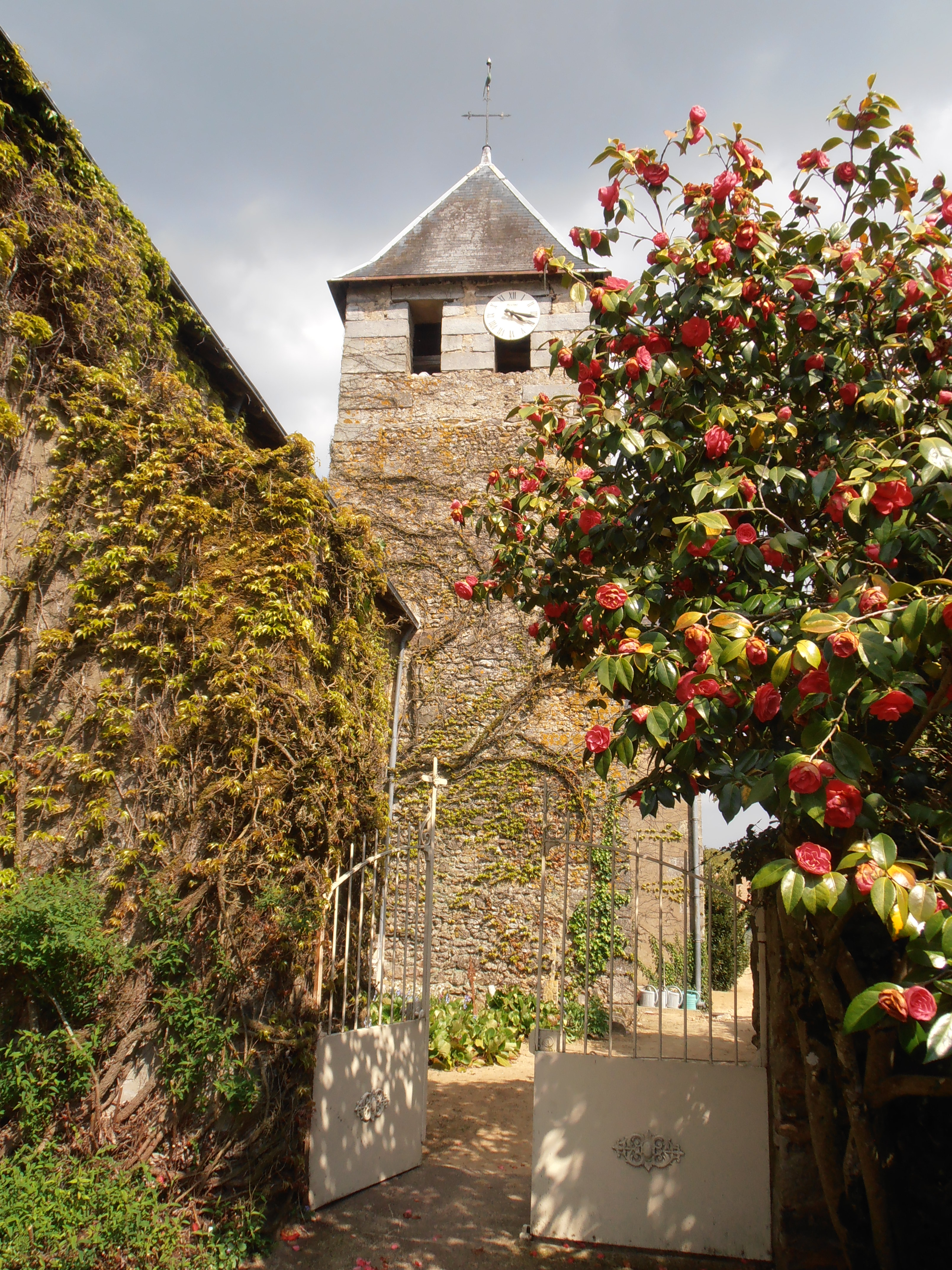
- The church
- Location of Courcelles-la-Forêt
- Location within France Location within Pays de la Loire
- Coordinates: 47°47′09″N 0°00′57″W
- Country: France
- Region: Pays de la Loire
- Department: Sarthe
- Arrondissement: La Flèche
- Canton: La Flèche
- Intercommunality: CC du Pays Fléchois

Government
  - Mayor (2020–2026): Virginie de la Fresnaye
- Area^{1}: 19.6 km^{2} (7.6 sq mi)
- Highest elevation: 108 m (354 ft)
- Lowest elevation: 36 m (118 ft)
- Population (2023): 397
  - Density: 20.3/km^{2} (52.5/sq mi)
- Demonym(s): Courcellais, Courcellaise
- Time zone: UTC+01:00 (CET)
  - Summer (DST): UTC+02:00 (CEST)
- INSEE/Postal code: 72100 /72270
- ^{1} French Land Register data, which excludes lakes, ponds, glaciers > 1 km^{2} (0.386 sq mi or 247 acres) and river estuaries.

Courcelles-la-Forêt (French pronunciation: [kuʁsɛl la fɔʁɛ]) is a commune in the Sarthe department in the Pays de la Loire region in north-western France.

== See also ==
- Communes of the Sarthe department
