= Crosmières =

- Commune
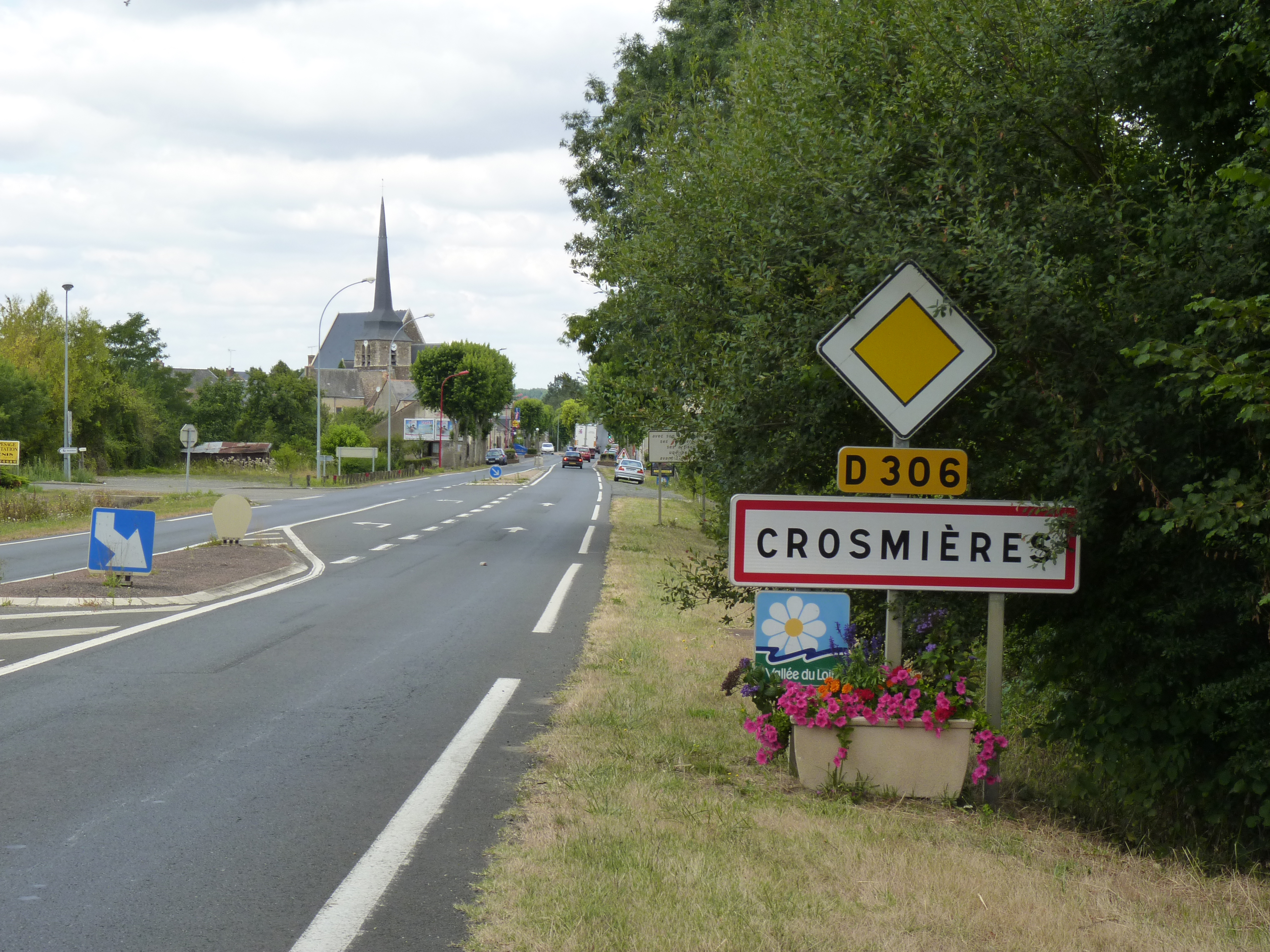
- The entrance to the village on road 306
- Location of Crosmières
- Location within France Location within Pays de la Loire
- Coordinates: 47°44′51″N 0°09′02″W
- Country: France
- Region: Pays de la Loire
- Department: Sarthe
- Arrondissement: La Flèche
- Canton: La Flèche
- Intercommunality: Pays Fléchois

Government
  - Mayor (2020–2026): Jean-Yves Denis
- Area^{1}: 20.6 km^{2} (8.0 sq mi)
- Population (2023): 974
  - Density: 47.3/km^{2} (122/sq mi)
- Demonym(s): Crosmièrois, Crosmièroise
- Time zone: UTC+01:00 (CET)
  - Summer (DST): UTC+02:00 (CEST)
- INSEE/Postal code: 72110 /72200
- ^{1} French Land Register data, which excludes lakes, ponds, glaciers > 1 km^{2} (0.386 sq mi or 247 acres) and river estuaries.

Crosmières (French pronunciation: [kʁomjɛʁ]) is a commune in the Sarthe department in the Pays de la Loire region in north-western France.

== Demographics ==
Historical population
| Year | Pop. | ±% p.a. |
|---|---|---|
| 1968 | 654 | — |
| 1975 | 657 | +0.07% |
| 1982 | 661 | +0.09% |
| 1990 | 703 | +0.77% |
| 1999 | 701 | −0.03% |
| 2007 | 906 | +3.26% |
| 2012 | 1,018 | +2.36% |
| 2017 | 1,044 | +0.51% |
| 2023 | 974 | −1.15% |
Source: INSEE

== See also ==
- Communes of the Sarthe department
