= Thorée-les-Pins =

- Commune
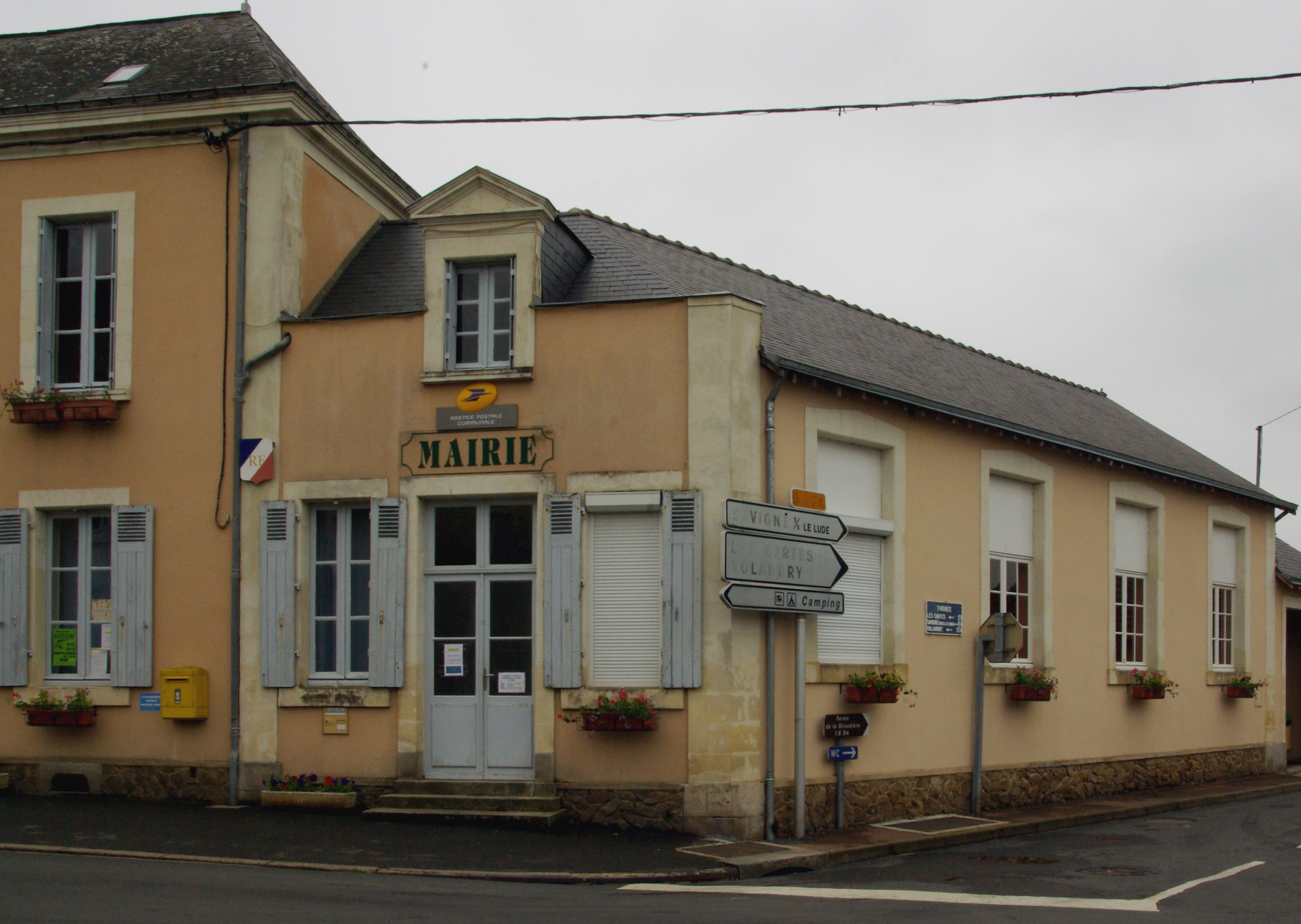
- The town hall of Thorée-les-Pins
- Location of Thorée-les-Pins
- Location within France Location within Pays de la Loire
- Coordinates: 47°41′14″N 0°02′35″E
- Country: France
- Region: Pays de la Loire
- Department: Sarthe
- Arrondissement: La Flèche
- Canton: La Flèche
- Intercommunality: Pays Fléchois

Government
  - Mayor (2020–2026): Joël Lelarge
- Area^{1}: 28.18 km^{2} (10.88 sq mi)
- Highest elevation: 87 m (285 ft)
- Lowest elevation: 23 m (75 ft)
- Population (2023): 744
  - Density: 26.4/km^{2} (68.4/sq mi)
- Demonym(s): Thoréen, Thoréenne
- Time zone: UTC+01:00 (CET)
  - Summer (DST): UTC+02:00 (CEST)
- INSEE/Postal code: 72357 /72800
- ^{1} French Land Register data, which excludes lakes, ponds, glaciers > 1 km^{2} (0.386 sq mi or 247 acres) and river estuaries.

Thorée-les-Pins (French pronunciation: [tɔʁe le pɛ̃]) is a commune in the Sarthe department in the region of Pays de la Loire in north-western France.

== See also ==
- Communes of the Sarthe department
