= Bazouges Cré sur Loir =

- Commune
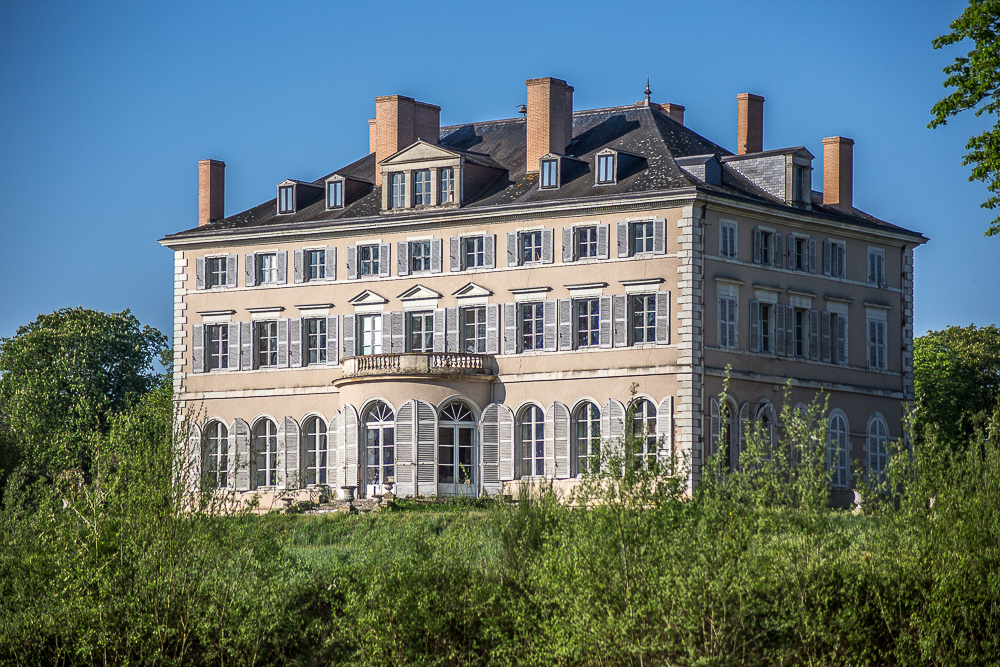
- The château of Barbée
- Location of Bazouges Cré sur Loir
- Location within France Location within Pays de la Loire
- Coordinates: 47°41′24″N 0°10′08″W
- Country: France
- Region: Pays de la Loire
- Department: Sarthe
- Arrondissement: La Flèche
- Canton: La Flèche
- Intercommunality: Pays Fléchois

Government
  - Mayor (2020–2026): Gwénaël de Sagazan
- Area^{1}: 47.09 km^{2} (18.18 sq mi)
- Population (2023): 1,977
  - Density: 41.98/km^{2} (108.7/sq mi)
- Time zone: UTC+01:00 (CET)
  - Summer (DST): UTC+02:00 (CEST)
- INSEE/Postal code: 72025 /72200
- ^{1} French Land Register data, which excludes lakes, ponds, glaciers > 1 km^{2} (0.386 sq mi or 247 acres) and river estuaries.

Bazouges Cré sur Loir (French pronunciation: [bazuʒ kʁe syʁ lwaʁ]) is a commune in the department of Sarthe, northwestern France. The municipality was established on 1 January 2017 by merger of the former communes of Bazouges-sur-le-Loir (the seat) and Cré-sur-Loir.

== See also ==
- Communes of the Sarthe department
