= Villaines-sous-Malicorne =

- Commune
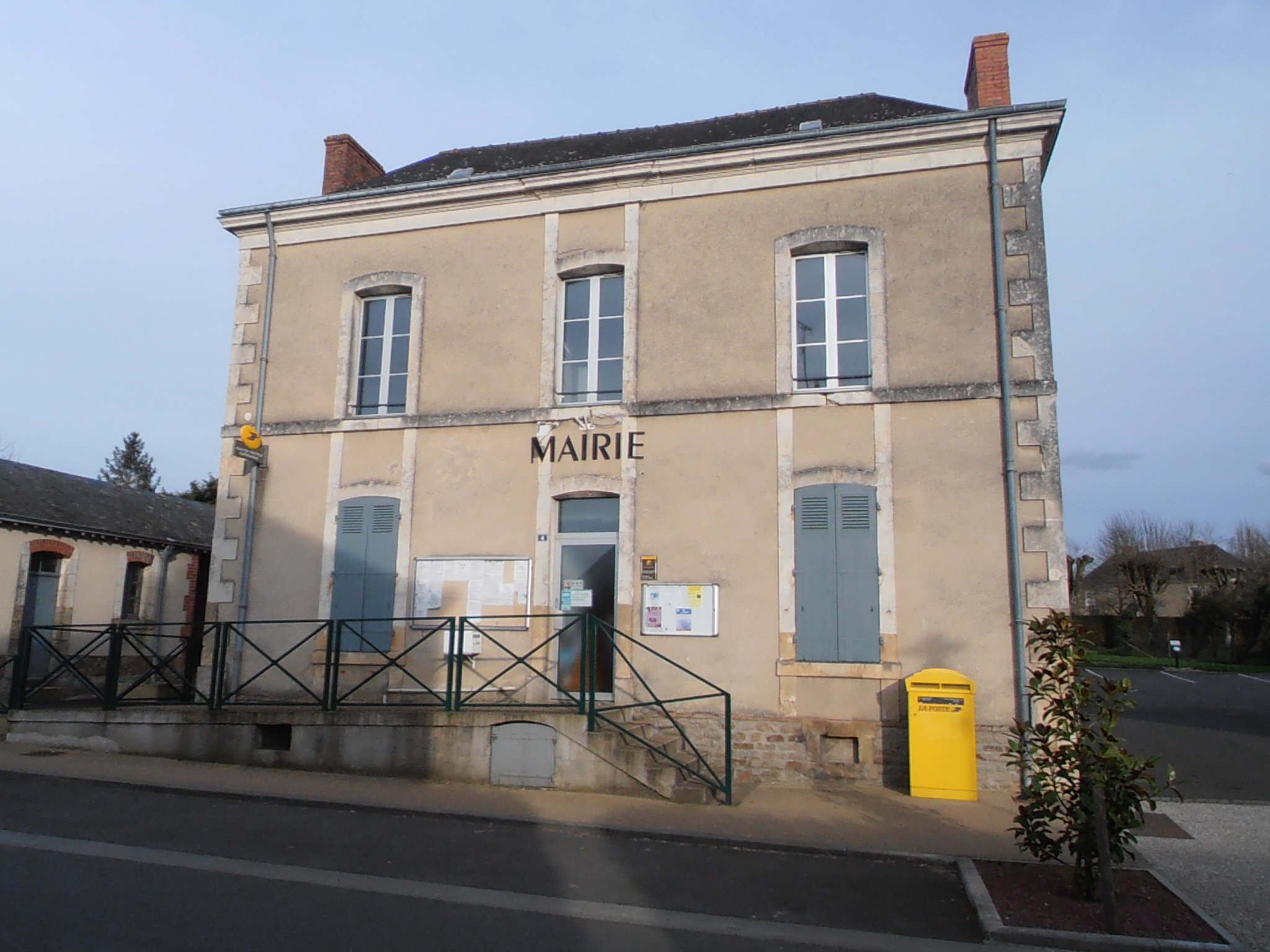
- The town hall of Villaines-sous-Malicorne
- Location of Villaines-sous-Malicorne
- Location within France Location within Pays de la Loire
- Coordinates: 47°45′59″N 0°06′01″W
- Country: France
- Region: Pays de la Loire
- Department: Sarthe
- Arrondissement: La Flèche
- Canton: La Flèche
- Intercommunality: Pays Fléchois

Government
  - Mayor (2020–2026): Laurent Hubert
- Area^{1}: 19.5 km^{2} (7.5 sq mi)
- Population (2023): 1,032
  - Density: 52.9/km^{2} (137/sq mi)
- Demonym(s): Villainais, Villainaise
- Time zone: UTC+01:00 (CET)
  - Summer (DST): UTC+02:00 (CEST)
- INSEE/Postal code: 72377 /72270
- ^{1} French Land Register data, which excludes lakes, ponds, glaciers > 1 km^{2} (0.386 sq mi or 247 acres) and river estuaries.

Villaines-sous-Malicorne (French pronunciation: [vilɛn su malikɔʁn], literally Villaines under Malicorne) is a commune in the Sarthe department in the region of Pays de la Loire in north-western France.

== See also ==
- Communes of the Sarthe department
