= Clermont-Créans =

- Commune
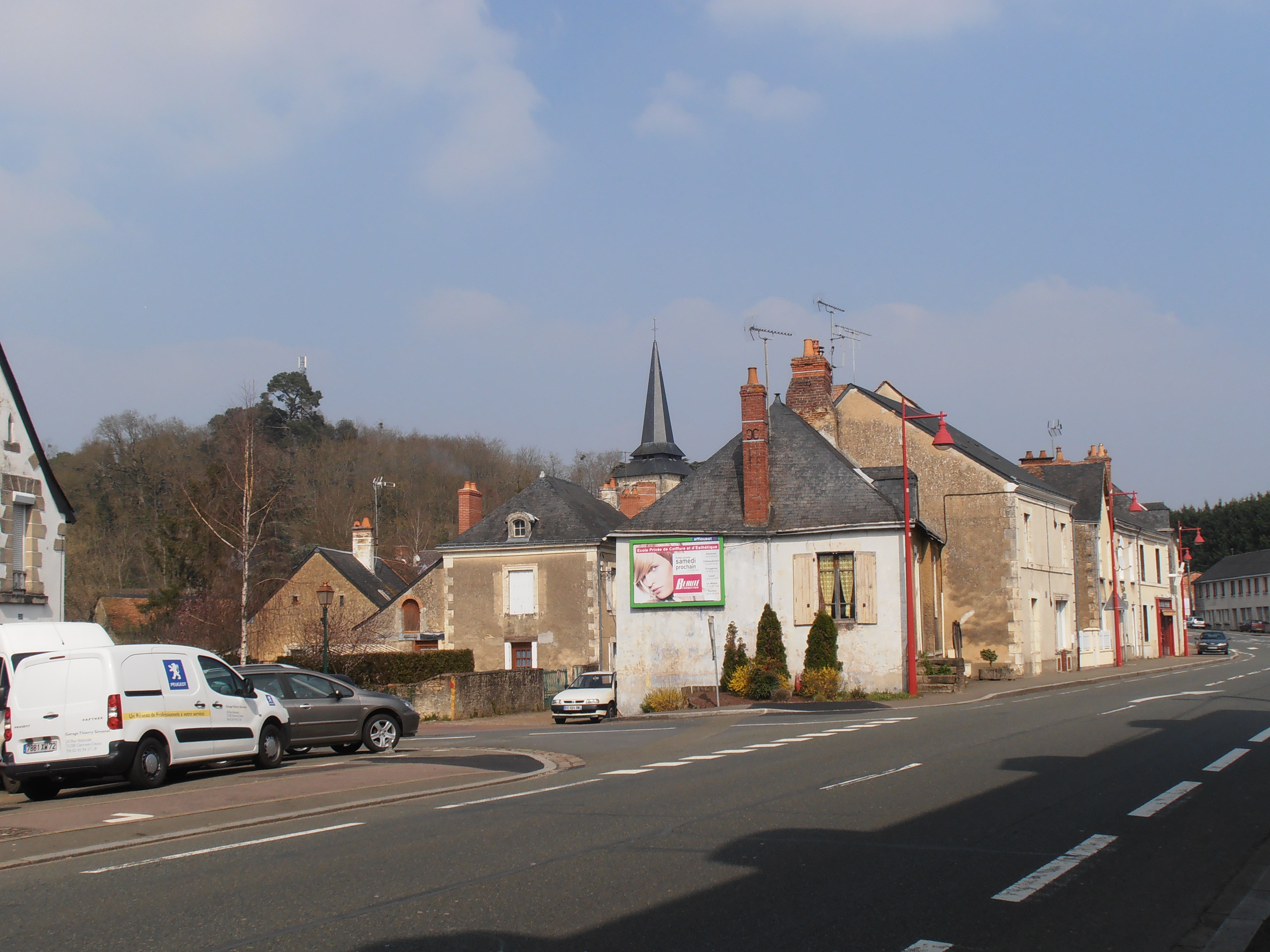
- View from the D323
- Location of Clermont-Créans
- Location within France Location within Pays de la Loire
- Coordinates: 47°43′09″N 0°00′45″W
- Country: France
- Region: Pays de la Loire
- Department: Sarthe
- Arrondissement: La Flèche
- Canton: La Flèche
- Intercommunality: Pays Fléchois

Government
  - Mayor (2020–2026): Michel Chaligné
- Area^{1}: 18.1 km^{2} (7.0 sq mi)
- Population (2023): 1,293
  - Density: 71.4/km^{2} (185/sq mi)
- Demonym(s): Clermontois, Clermontoise
- Time zone: UTC+01:00 (CET)
  - Summer (DST): UTC+02:00 (CEST)
- INSEE/Postal code: 72084 /72200
- ^{1} French Land Register data, which excludes lakes, ponds, glaciers > 1 km^{2} (0.386 sq mi or 247 acres) and river estuaries.

Clermont-Créans (French pronunciation: [klɛʁmɔ̃ kʁeɑ̃]) is a commune in the Sarthe department in the Pays de la Loire region in north-western France.

== See also ==
- Communes of the Sarthe department
