= Zoo de la Flèche =

Zoo de La Flèche
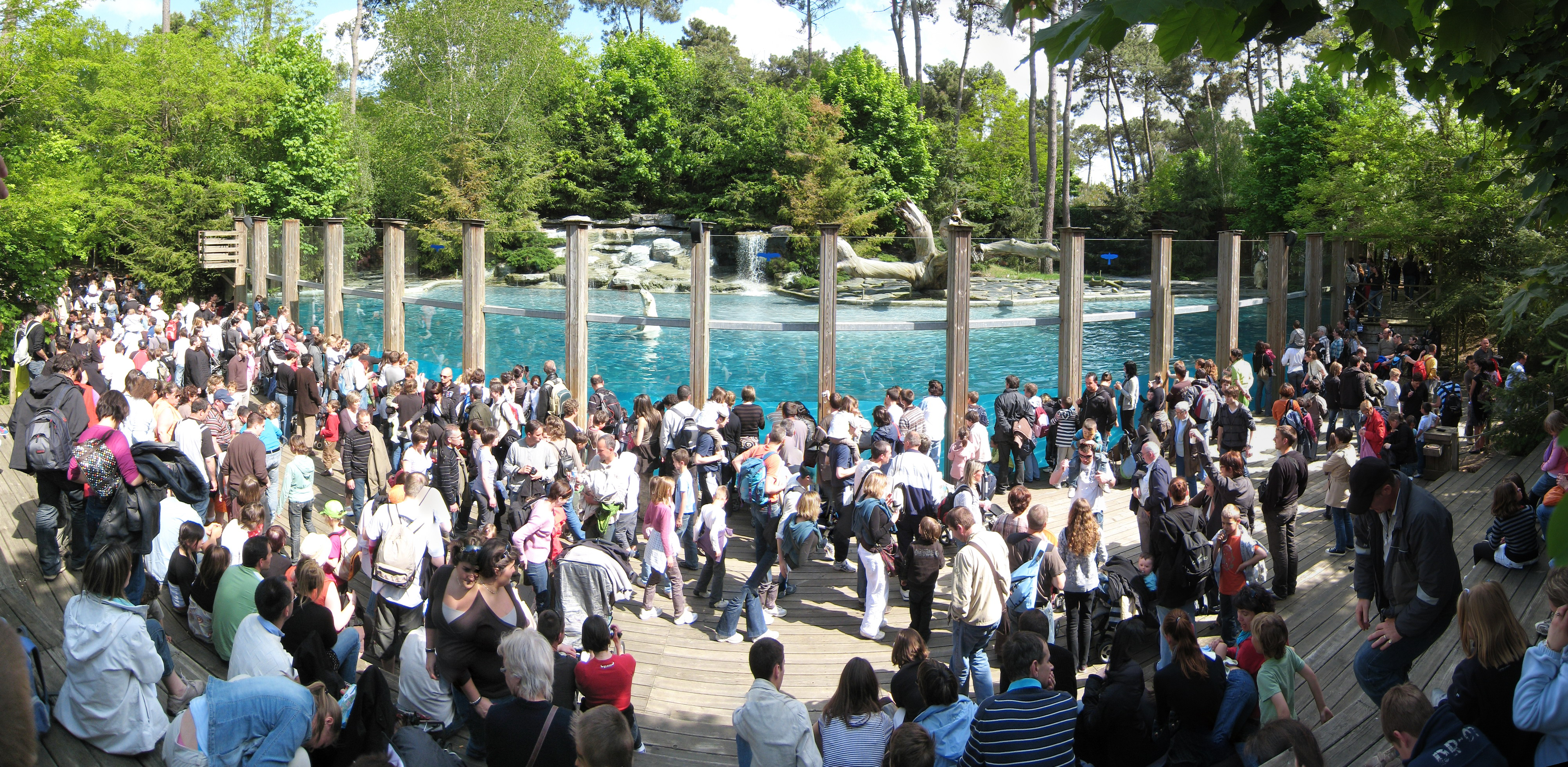
- Interactive map of Zoo de La Flèche
- Date opened: 1946
- Location: La Flèche, Sarthe, Pays de la Loire, France
- No. of animals: 1,600
- No. of species: 160
- Annual visitors: 441.000 (2017)
- Memberships: EAZA, AFdPZ
- Owner: Looping Group
- Website: www.zoo-la-fleche.com

The Zoo de La Flèche (formally Parc Zoologique du Tertre-Rouge) is a 18-hectare (44-acre) zoo park that opened in 1946 in La Flèche, Pays de la Loire, France.

The zoo is home to some 1,600 animals representing about 160 species, and is a member of the European Association of Zoos and Aquaria (EAZA) and the Association Française des Parcs Zoologiques (AFdPZ).

In 2019, it was the third most visited tourist attraction in the Pays de la Loire. The zoo was also the subject of the wildlife documentary series Une saison au zoo, broadcast between 2014 and 2022 on France 4.

== History ==
Naturalist Jacques Bouillault settled in 1946 in a small forest lodge on the Tertre-Rouge hill, south-east of La Flèche. He gathered a collection of animals and founded the Tertre-Rouge Zoological Park, the first private zoo in post-war France. In 1960, Bouillault created a natural history museum within the park, featuring dioramas with over 500 regional animal specimens. The museum was renovated in 1973, and a vivarium was inaugurated in 1971. Visitor numbers reached 245,000 in 1973.

In the early 1980s, the zoo encountered financial difficulties. An “Association of Friends of Tertre-Rouge” and a management company were created to support operations, but Bouillault declared bankruptcy in 1988. The zoo was purchased by local insurance broker Raymond Da Cunha and renamed “Zoo de La Flèche”. Bouillault remained employed there until 1992. In 1997, Raymond Da Cunha transferred management to his son Stéphane.

In 2017, the Looping Group acquired the zoo. Stéphane Da Cunha remained president but stepped down as director, a role taken over by Benjamin Gauthier and, from 2018, by Céline Talineau.

On 25 January 2020, an accidental fire destroyed the bat cave and several terrariums, killing around fifty animals, including Egyptian fruit bats, Madagascar geckos, an Asian rat snake, and a Uromastyx lizard.
