= Mareil-sur-Loir =

- Commune
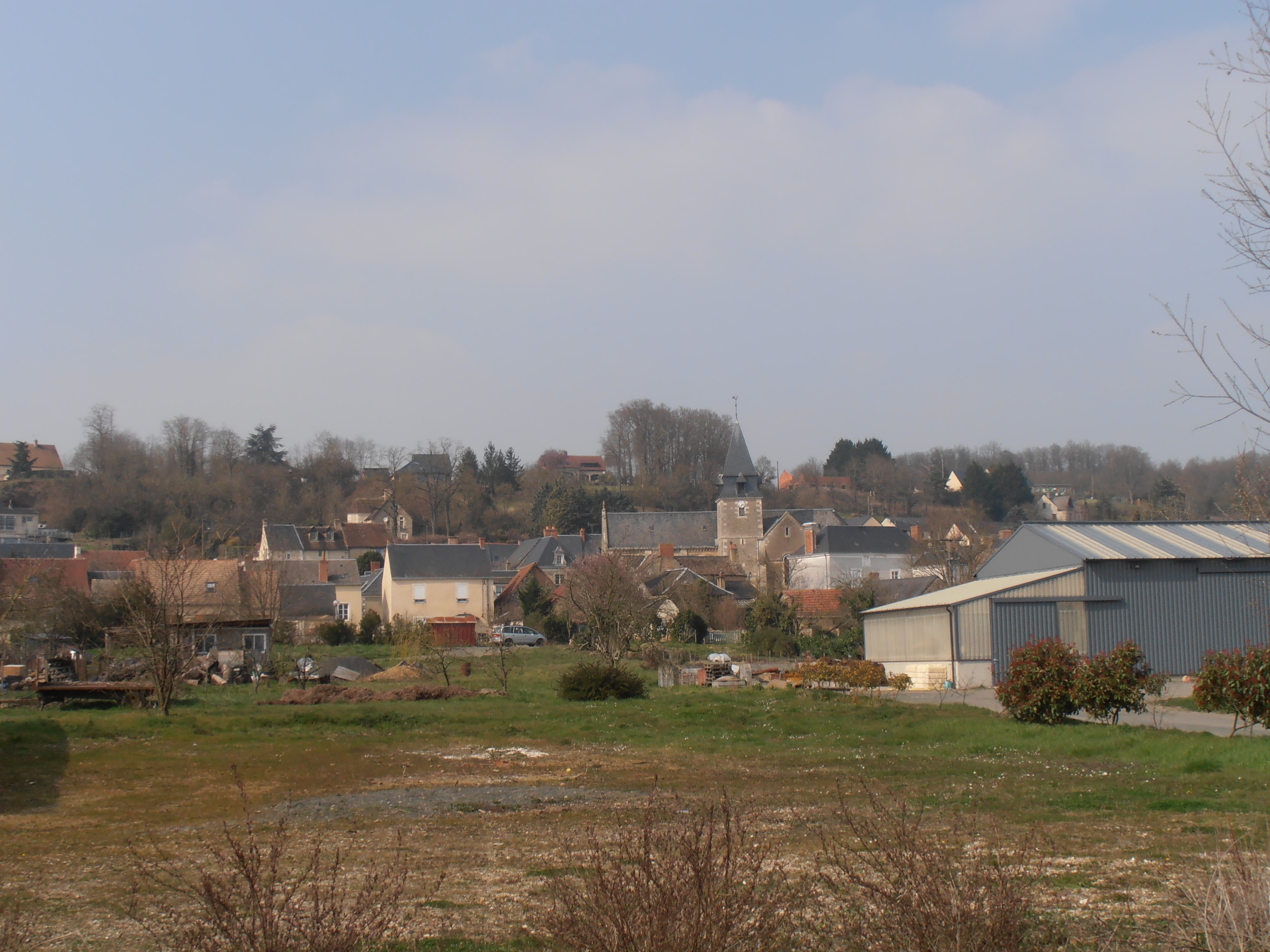
- A general view of Mareil-sur-Loir

- Coat of arms
- Location of Mareil-sur-Loir
- Location within France Location within Pays de la Loire
- Coordinates: 47°42′54″N 0°00′43″E
- Country: France
- Region: Pays de la Loire
- Department: Sarthe
- Arrondissement: La Flèche
- Canton: La Flèche
- Intercommunality: Pays Fléchois

Government
  - Mayor (2020–2026): Jérôme Prémartin
- Area^{1}: 12 km^{2} (4.6 sq mi)
- Highest elevation: 102 m (335 ft)
- Lowest elevation: 28 m (92 ft)
- Population (2023): 653
  - Density: 54/km^{2} (140/sq mi)
- Demonym(s): Mareillais, Mareillaise
- Time zone: UTC+01:00 (CET)
  - Summer (DST): UTC+02:00 (CEST)
- INSEE/Postal code: 72185 /72200
- ^{1} French Land Register data, which excludes lakes, ponds, glaciers > 1 km^{2} (0.386 sq mi or 247 acres) and river estuaries.

Mareil-sur-Loir (French pronunciation: [maʁɛj syʁ lwaʁ], literally Mareil on Loir) is a commune in the Sarthe department in the region of Pays de la Loire in north-western France.

== See also ==
- Communes of the Sarthe department
