= Canton of La Flèche =

Coordinates: 47.70°N 0.07°W

The canton of La Flèche is an administrative division of the Sarthe department, northwestern France. Its borders were modified at the French canton reorganisation which came into effect in March 2015. Its seat is in La Flèche.

It consists of the following communes:

1. Arthezé
2. Bazouges Cré sur Loir
3. Bousse
4. La Chapelle-d'Aligné
5. Clermont-Créans
6. Courcelles-la-Forêt
7. Crosmières
8. La Flèche
9. Ligron
10. Mareil-sur-Loir
11. Thorée-les-Pins
12. Villaines-sous-Malicorne
