= Bousse, Sarthe =

Bousse
- Commune
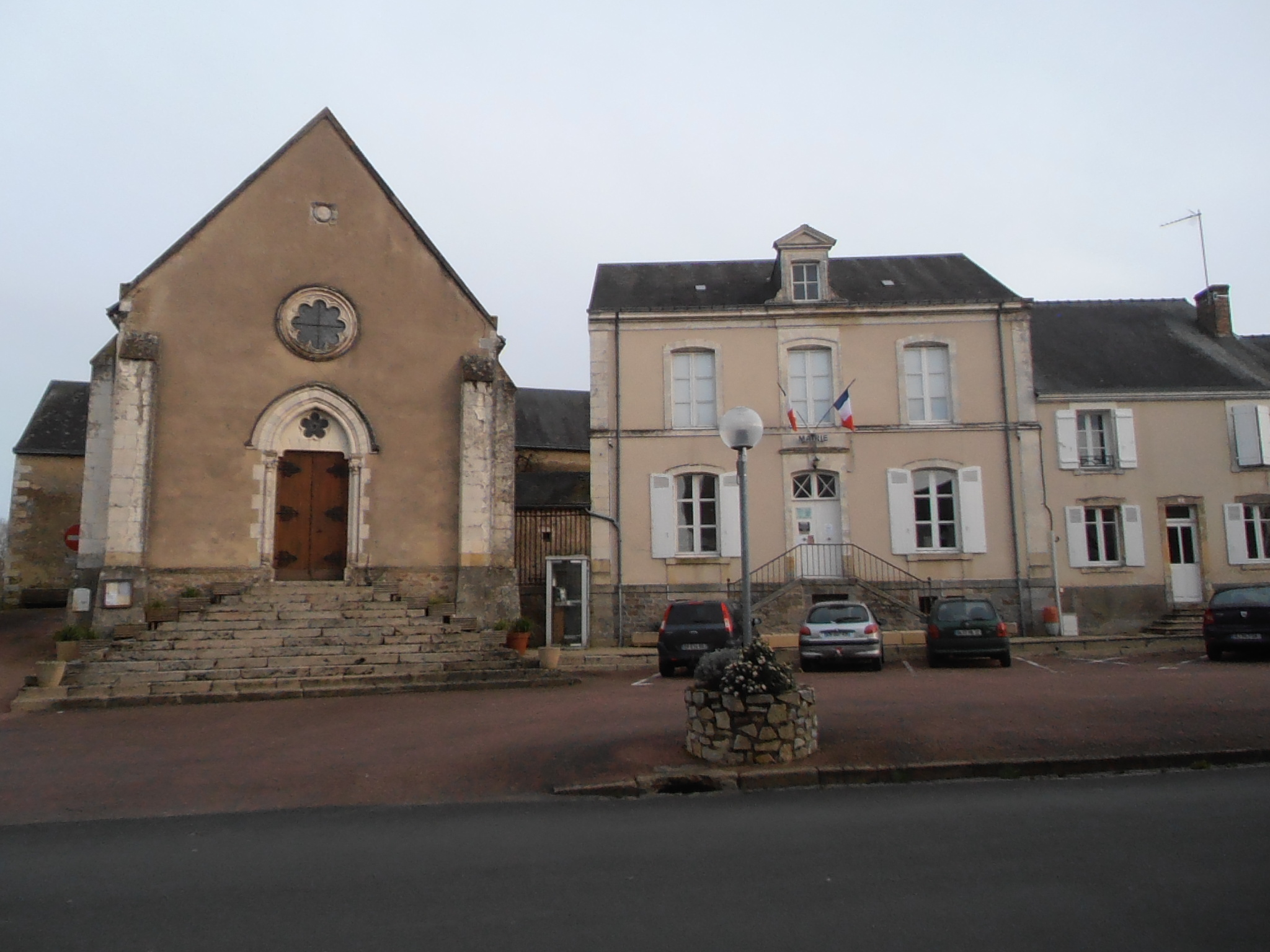
- Place Saint-Aubin, the church and town hall
- Location of Bousse
- Location within France Location within Pays de la Loire
- Coordinates: 47°46′10″N 0°03′29″W
- Country: France
- Region: Pays de la Loire
- Department: Sarthe
- Arrondissement: La Flèche
- Canton: La Flèche
- Intercommunality: CC du Pays Fléchois

Government
  - Mayor (2020–2026): Françoise Farcy
- Area^{1}: 12.02 km^{2} (4.64 sq mi)
- Highest elevation: 103 m (338 ft)
- Lowest elevation: 39 m (128 ft)
- Population (2023): 431
  - Density: 35.9/km^{2} (92.9/sq mi)
- Demonym(s): Bousseron, Bousseronne
- Time zone: UTC+01:00 (CET)
  - Summer (DST): UTC+02:00 (CEST)
- INSEE/Postal code: 72044 /72270
- ^{1} French Land Register data, which excludes lakes, ponds, glaciers > 1 km^{2} (0.386 sq mi or 247 acres) and river estuaries.

Bousse (French pronunciation: [bus]) is a commune in the Sarthe department in the region of Pays de la Loire in north-western France.

== See also ==
- Communes of the Sarthe department
