= Château de Montaupin =

- Sarthe in France
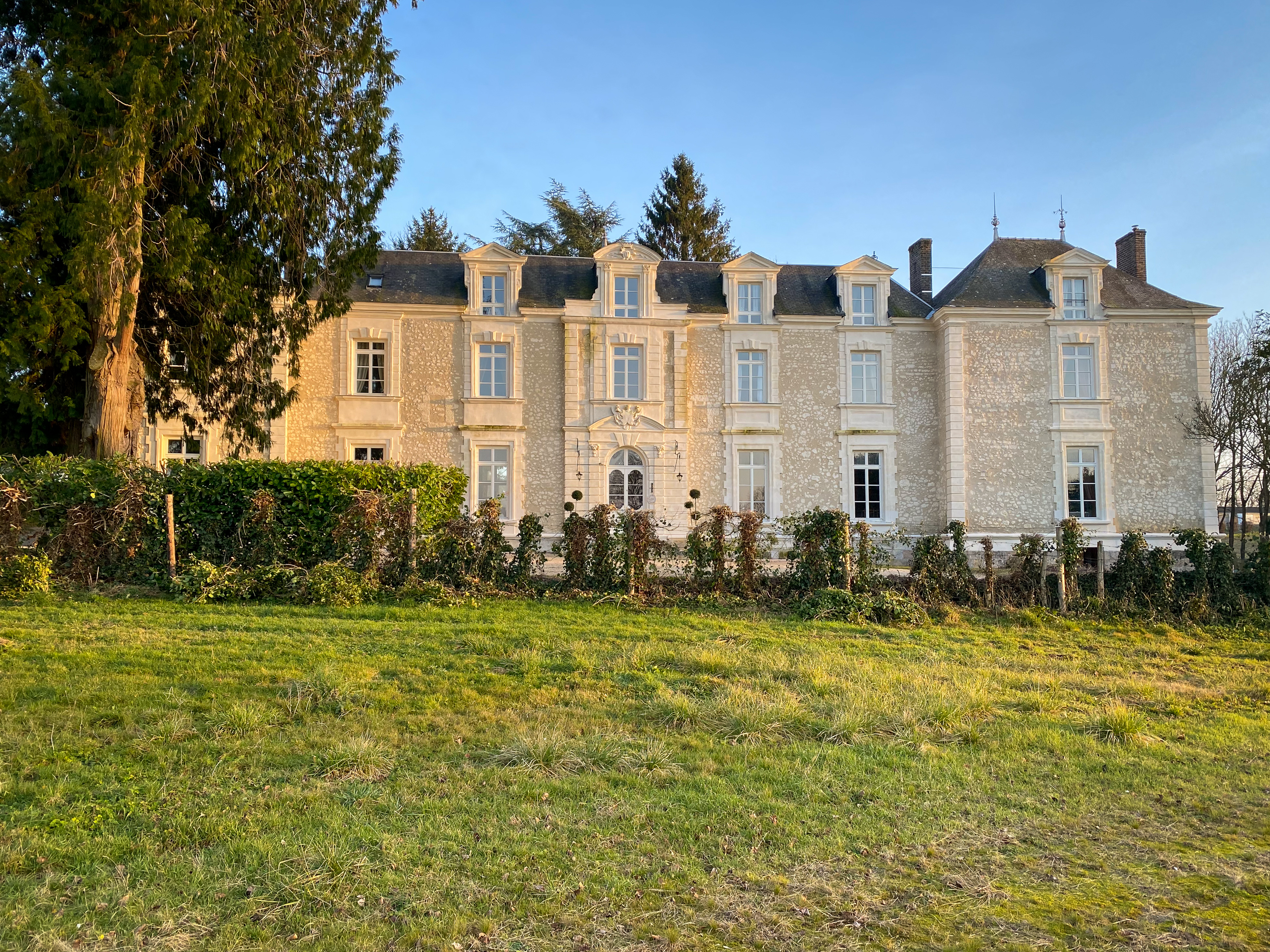

Site information
- Owner: Fadel family

Location
- Coordinates: 47°48′23″N 0°06′29″E

Site history
- Built: 18th century

The Château de Montaupin is an 18th-century castle located south of the village of Oizé, in the historical region of Maine (now part of the Sarthe department), approximately thirty kilometers south of Le Mans, France.

The castle was rebuilt in the late 18th century on the site of a former feudal castle dating back to the 11th and 12th centuries. The oldest surviving part of the present structure is a turret dating from the 15th century. The rest of the building comprises elements constructed in the 18th and 19th centuries.

Only a few elements of the original structure have withstood the passage of time: dating from the 15th century, the turret, two cellars, and the crypt of the former Sainte Marie-Madeleine chapel remain visible. A twin turret was demolished in the early 20th century, and over time, the château's architecture has been altered and modified.

The estate is currently listed as a built heritage site to be protected under Article L.151-19 of the French Urban Planning Code.

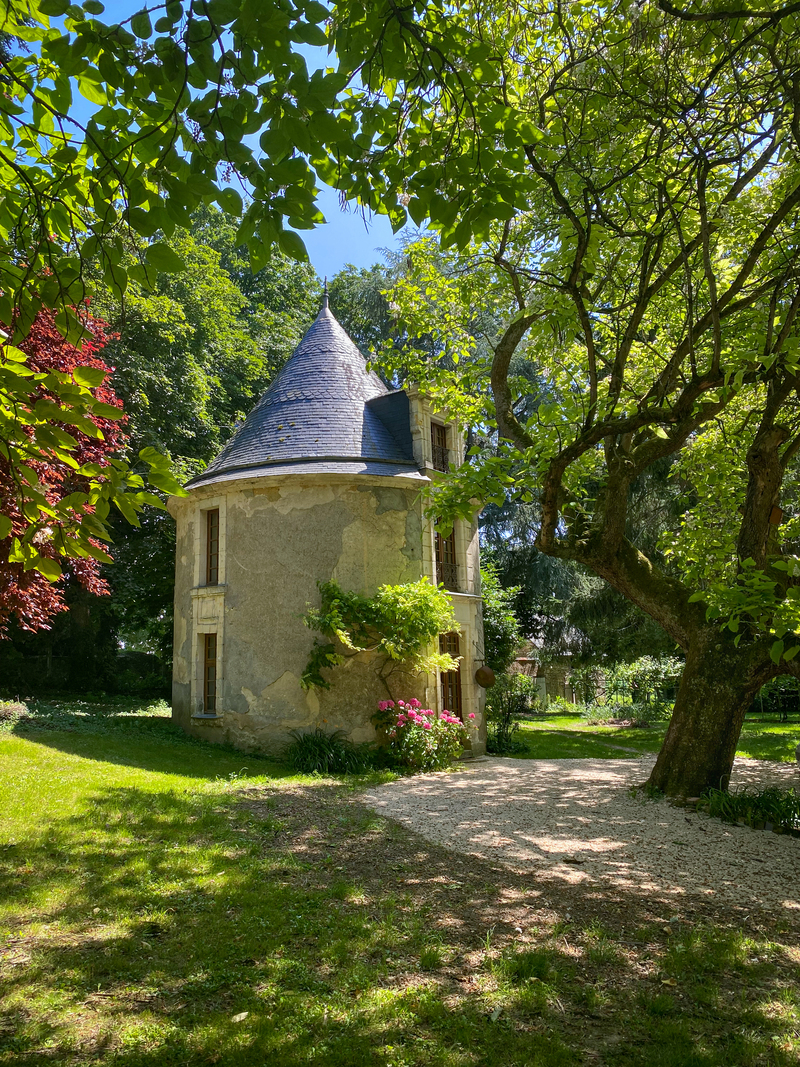
The castle's dovecote

== The Château de Montaupin through the ages (479–2021) ==
=== The castle of Montaupin-la-Cour in the Middle Ages (479–1492) ===
There were initially two castles named Montaupin: the Château de Montaupin-Jacquette and the Château de Montaupin-La-Cour (the current estate). Both were located south of the village of Oizé, a seigneurial possession at the time. Jean and Girard de Montaupin are mentioned in the Cartulary of Château-du-Loir as vassals of the castellany of Oizé, circa 1239.

The castle of Montaupin appears in historical records as a seigneurial possession around 1342. On 4 February 1392, Guillaume Chastain, the owner of the fief of Montaupin-Jacquette, became a vassal of Guyon du Bouchet, Lord of Bouchet-aux-Corneilles.

Montaupin-La-Cour, owned by the castellany of Foulletourte, belonged to the du Bouchet family from the 14th century. The du Bouchet family were the lords of Bouchet-aux-Corneilles, an old fortress in the area dating back to the 11th or 12th century, now destroyed, located in Oizé at the border with the town of Requeil.

At the beginning of the 15th century, the region was affected by the Hundred Years' War. In 1425, the Château du Bouchet-aux-Corneilles fell into the hands of English soldiers under Henry VI, before being retaken.

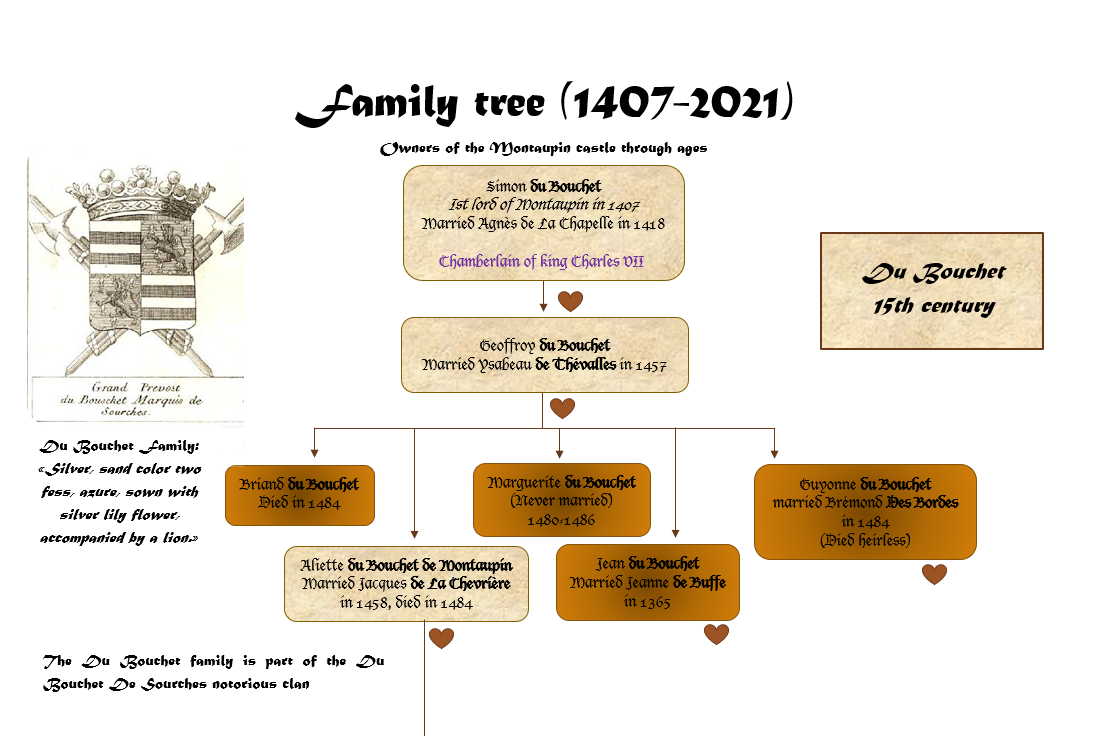
Du Bouschet family tree

==== The Du Bouschet Family ====
It can thus be deduced that the "du Bouschet" family belonged to one of the branches of the Du Bouchet De Sourches family prominent lords and landowners in the area. Simon du Bouchet appears to have inherited the castle or lands of Montaupin before establishing himself there as the first lord.

In 1407, Simon du Bouchet, chamberlain (a noble of the royal court responsible for the sovereign's chamber service) to King Charles VII, became the first lord of Château de Montaupin. His son, Geoffroy du Bouschet, squire (a noble who accompanied a knight and bore his coat of arms) and lord of Bouchet, is little known. In 1457, he donated an annual rent of 2 sols 6 deniers tournois to the church of Requeil. He married Ysabeau de Thévalles and had five children:

Ysabeau de Thévalles gave birth to five children. The eldest, Jean du Bouchet (1340–1404), squire, became lord of Bouchet. He married Jeanne de Buffe in 1365 and inherited the lordships of Montaupin-la-Cour, Buffe, and Les Mortiers. He later exchanged Montaupin-la-Cour, along with its woods and vineyards, for "La Dreuserie," an estate located near Montaupin, before dying in 1475. His brother Briand du Bouchet died before 24 June 1484. Their sister Guyonne du Bouchet, widow of Bremond des Bordes, squire, was still alive in 1484. Aliette du Bouchet contracted marriage on 13 January 1458, to Jacques de La Chevrière, squire and lord of La Roche de Vaux. She died in 1484. Finally, their sister Marguerite du Bouchet was born in 1480 and died in 1486.

Guyonne du Bouchet was the sole heiress. She contested the dealings concerning the Bouchet lands and initiated a lawsuit following her brother Jean's death. She won the case at the Court of Le Mans, reimbursed 610 écus to the buyers, and regained possession of the properties alienated by her brother. On 13 September 1486, she sold the estate for the modest sum of 2,211 livres to her brother-in-law Jacques de La Chevrière, squire, lord of La Roche de Vaux in Requeil, married to her sister Aliette.

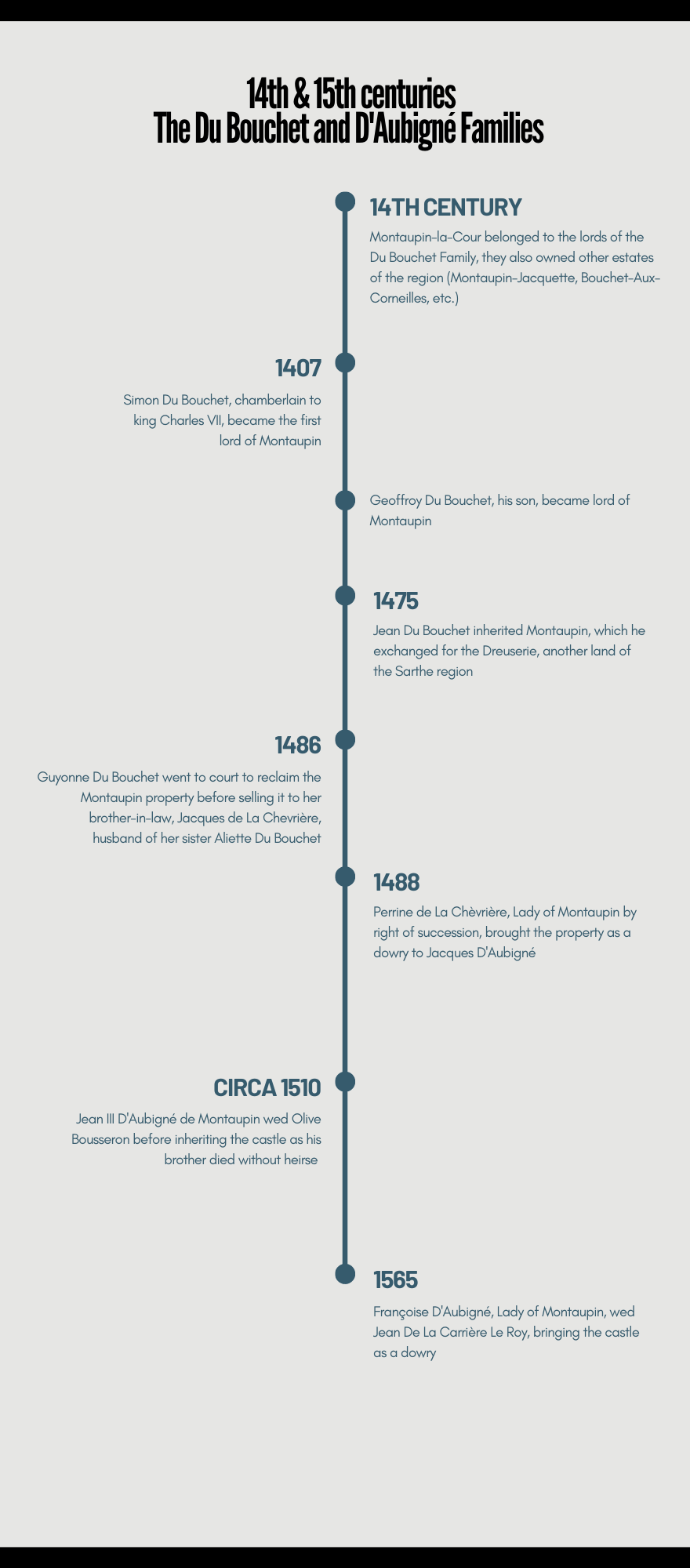
Montaupin's timeline from the 14th to 15th century

==== The d'Aubigné Family ====
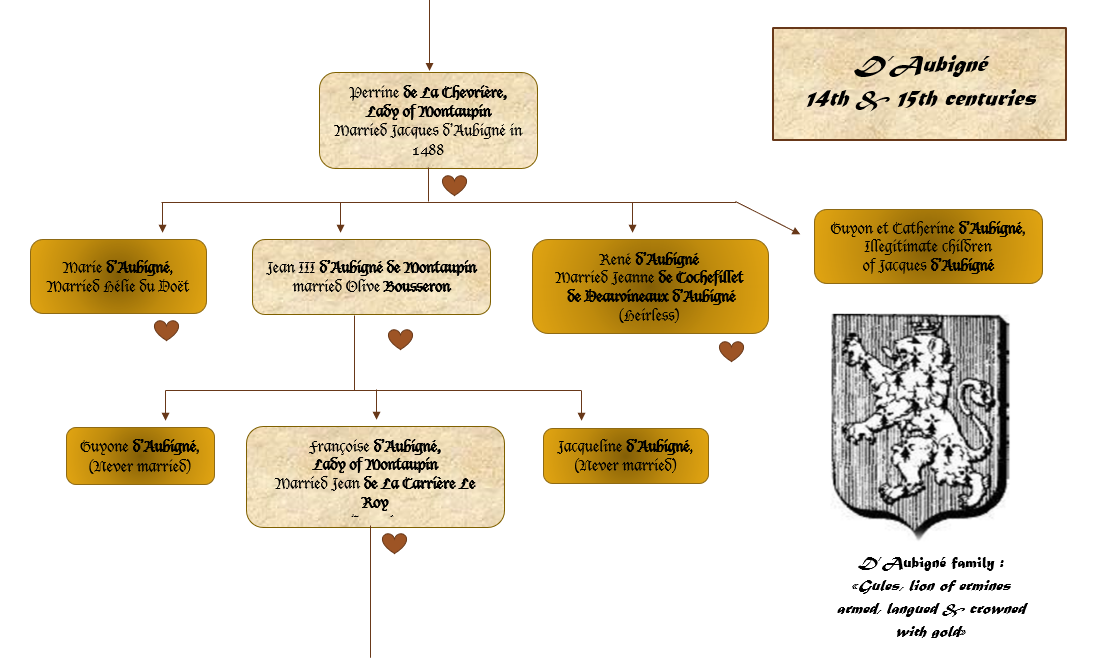
D'Aubigné family tree

Jacques and Aliette de La Chevrière had a daughter, Perrine de La Chevrière, the "Lady of Montaupin." At the latter's marriage, on 4 August 1488, she brought the property as a dowry to Jacques d'Aubigné, fourth son of Jean II d'Aubigné, lord of La Perrière, and Yolande du Cloître. Jacques d'Aubigné was the vassal of the Lord of Foulletourte. He had three children with Aliette: Jean III, Marie and René, as well as two "natural" children, Guyon and Catherine.

It seems that the current farm of Montaupin-Jacquette would have been the manor until then and Jacques d'Aubigné would have transferred his powers to Montaupin-la-Cour. Architecture undoubtedly resulted from this change since the dovecote, the last visible vestige of the feudal period, dates from this period.

It is after the death of Jacques D'Aubigné in 1531 that his sons bore the title of Lord of Aubigné and Montaupin.

=== The Castle of Montaupin during the Renaissance (1450–1600) ===
==== The d'Aubigné family ====
René d'Aubigné, knight and lord of Montaupin, son of Jacques d'Aubigné, married Jeanne de Cochefillet de Vauvineux but left no descendants. The same applies to his sister, Marie d'Aubigné, who was married to Hélie du Doët.

Jean III d'Aubigné de Montaupin, the primary heir and lord of Montaupin, married Olive Bousseron, with whom he had three daughters: Guyone, Jacqueline, and Françoise.

The first two daughters died without marrying, while Françoise d'Aubigné became Lady of Montaupin through her marriage to Jean de La Carrière Le Roy in 1565. He rendered homage to André de Beauvau, lord of Foulletourte, on 19 June 1574.

==== The Le Roy family ====
From her marriage to Jean de La Carrière Le Roy, Françoise d'Aubigné had four children. Pierre, squire and lord of Montaupin and La Carrière; Jean, squire and lord of La Carrière, La Houssaye, Monfoulon and Les Rochettes, who married in 1605 Esther Gaultier, daughter of François Gaultier, squire and lord of Aubigné. Jean rendered homage to his elder brother for the estate of La Foucherie, where he resided on 4 July 1608, and later lived at La Marionnière, near the town of Saint-Sauveur-de-Flée, from 1610 to 1614, and at Les Rochettes, in the parish of Aviré, from 1621 to 1633. He served as guardian and noble tutor of his children from 1617 to 1630, and became guardian of his nephew Pierre in 1633. Renée, another daughter, married François de Hodon, squire and lord of Les Buchetières, in 1611. Lastly, Julien Le Roy, lord of La Foucherie, married Suzanne de Guerguebec and died in Oizé on 11 October 1605. His widow was appointed "noble guardian" of their son, Charles Le Roy, squire and lord of Assé, in 1611.

Pierre Le Roy succeeded his father as lord of Montaupin. On 11 June 1593, Pierre I Le Roy rendered homage for Montaupin, and later married Barbe de Mondragon on 10 March 1611. He died in 1618.

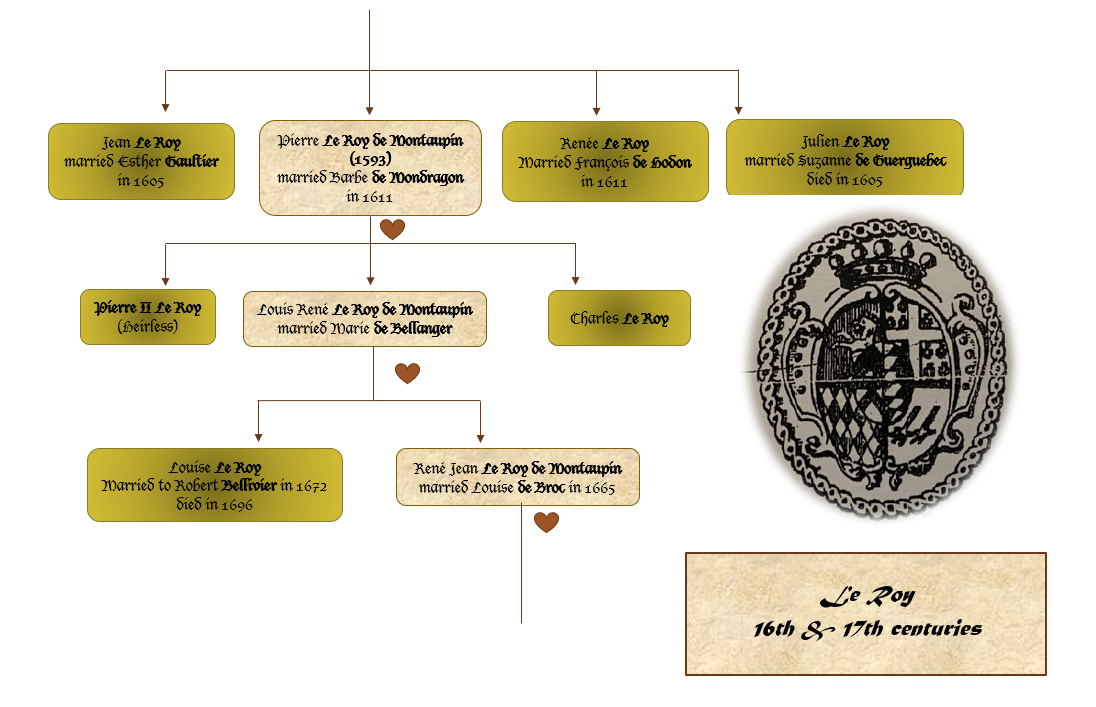
The Le Roy family tree – Montaupin

=== The Montaupin castle in the 17th century ===
==== The Le Roy family ====
Pierre Le Roy de Montaupin and Barbe de Mondragon had three children: Pierre II, who died without issue between 1633 and 1644; Louis René; and Charles Le Roy.

His wife, Barbe de Mondragon, Lady of Le Bignon and Le Verger, already a widow in 1618, remarried Cyprien Le Vayer, squire and lord of Bourgjolly.

Louis René I Le Roy, squire and lord of Montaupin, inherited the estate and married Marie de Bellanger. They had several children for whom their guardian rendered fealty and homage on 6 March 1656.

Louise Le Roy married Robert Bellivier in 1672 and died in 1696. Her brother, René Jean Le Roy, squire and lord of Montaupin, married Louise de Broc on 12 January 1665 in the church of Broc. She was the daughter of Jacques de Broc, knight, Baron of Saint-Mars-la-Pile, lord of Broc, and Marguerite de Bourdeille. Louise de Broc later became a lady-in-waiting to the Princess of Lamballe, Lady of Pommery. At the age of 18, the Princess of Lamballe became a close friend of Queen Marie Antoinette, then Dauphine, and was appointed Superintendent of the Queen's Household.

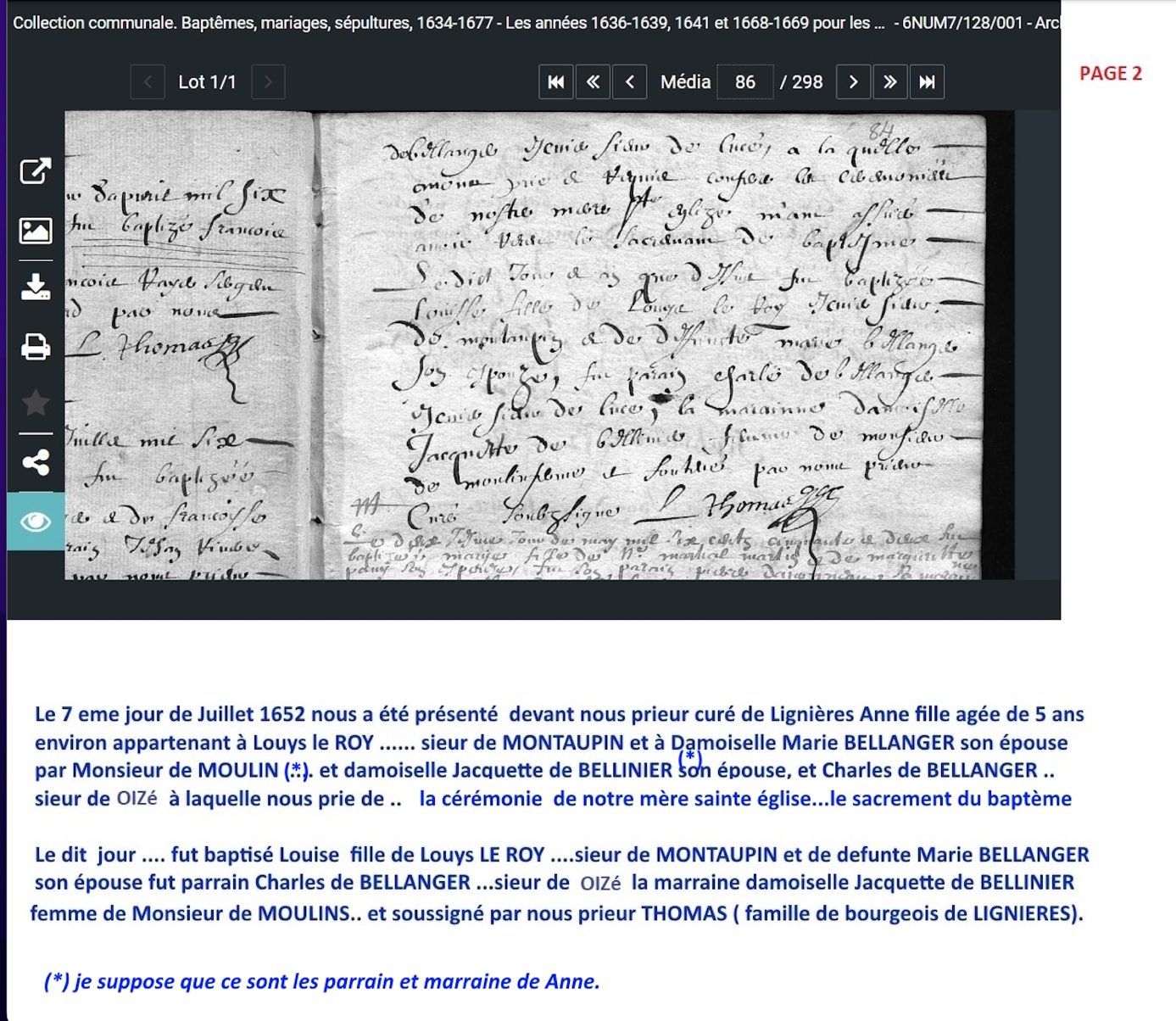
A baptism certificate mentions Louise Le Roy, daughter of René Jean Le Roy and Louise de Broc.

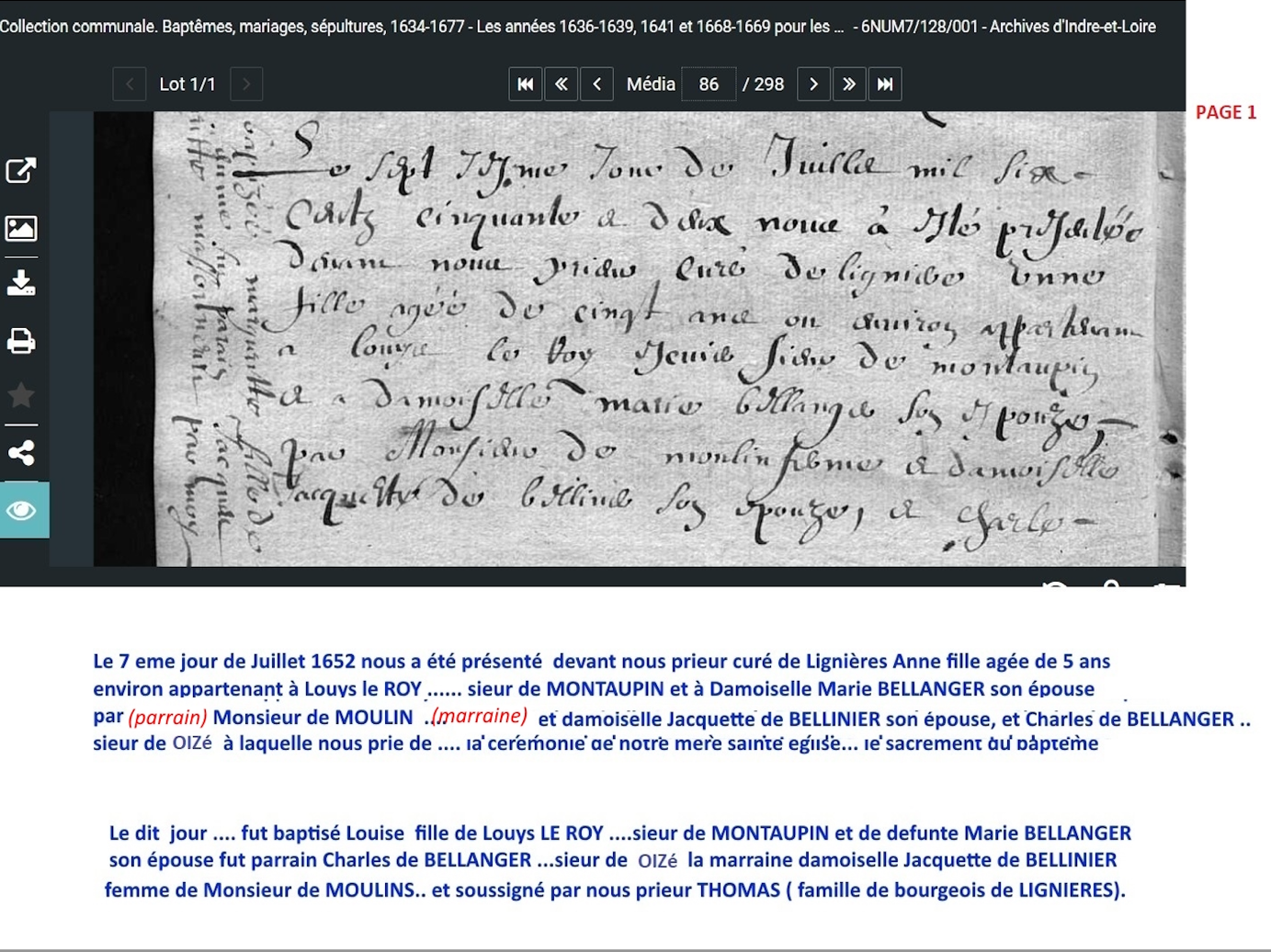
A baptism certificate mentions Anne Le Roy, daughter of René Jean Le Roy and Louise de Broc.

On 19 January 1686, René Jean Le Roy received, on behalf of his wife, from the children of the late Armand de Broc, a deed sealed by René Le Roy and Louise de Broc, Lord of Échemiré, pending the final settlement of the estate of Sébastien de Broc, Lord of Foulletourte and Les Perrais, the "house," estate, and appurtenances of Beaumont in Oizé, as well as the Mocque Souris mill. These had been previously allotted to the said Armand de Broc in an earlier division of inheritance. René Jean Le Roy served as a lieutenant in the Lyonnais Regiment in 1689.

On 19 January 1686, René Jean Le Roy received, on behalf of his wife, from the children of the late Armand de Broc, a deed sealed by René Le Roy and Louise de Broc, Lord of Échemiré, pending the final settlement of the estate of Sébastien de Broc, Lord of Foulletourte and Les Perrais, the "house," estate, and appurtenances of Beaumont in Oizé, as well as the Mocque Souris mill. These had been previously allotted to the said Armand de Broc in an earlier division of inheritance. René Jean Le Roy served as a lieutenant in the Lyonnais Regiment in 1689.

=== The Montaupin castle in the 18th century ===
==== The Le Roy family ====
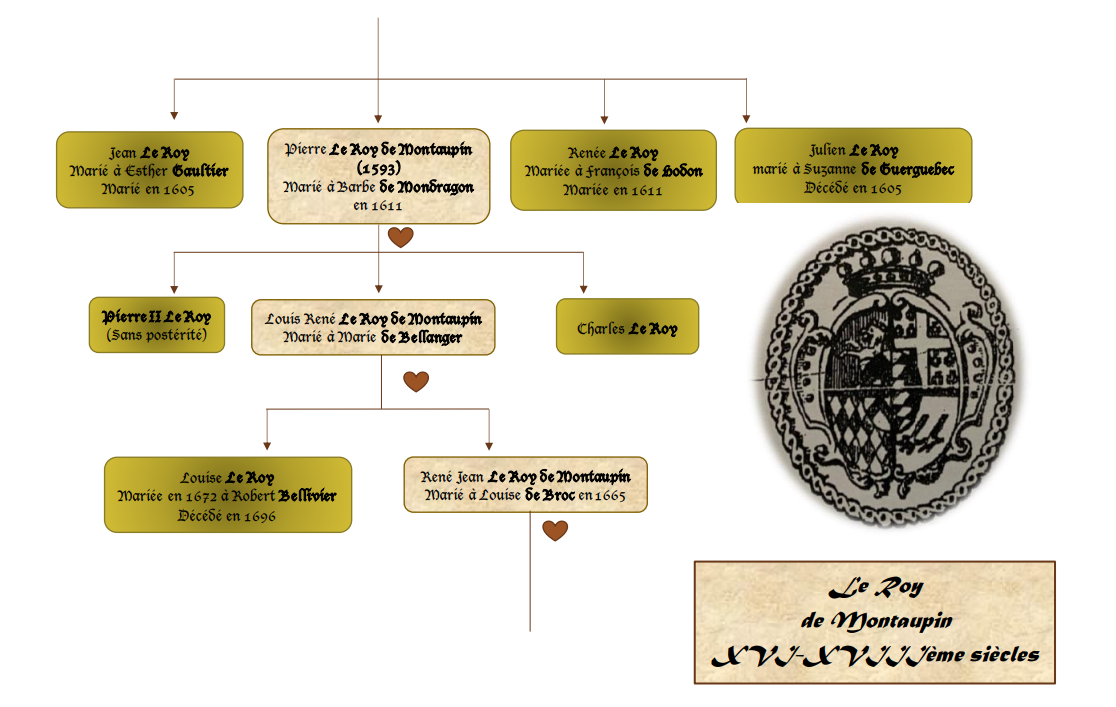
Le Roy family tree; credits to the creators of this page

Louise de Broc died on 15 June 1706, and was buried in the church of Oizé on 28 June of the same year. Her husband died on 20 November 1721.Seven children were born from their union. Louise died in 1738 without marriage or issue. Renée, born on 22 October 1675, married on 28 January 1711, to Magdelon Thimoléon de Savonnières, knight and lord of Entre-Deux-Bois and Courdenet at Vaas, son of Jean-Guillaume de Savonnières and Marie de La Haye. Marie died in 1782 without issue, and Catherine-Ambroise, who died in 1715, also died without marriage or heirs. René-Pierre, along with Louis-Auguste, baptized on 27 May 1681, inherited the seigneury of Montaupin. Louis-Auguste married first Marie-Madeleine Aubert de Boisguiet in 1731, then Marie-Thérèse de Moloré in a second marriage in 1752. Only three children survived their father: Renée, Louise, and Louis, knight, lord of Montaupin and Beaumont.

In 1731, Louis-Auguste Le Roy de Montaupin married Marie-Madeleine Aubert de Boisguiet (daughter of René Aubert, lord of Boisguiet, lawyer at the Parliament, lord of Yvré-le-Pôlin, and Marie Le Peletier de Feumusson), and pursued a military career. Between 1725 and 1732, he served as artillery commander in La Rochelle, Knight of the Order of Saint Louis, and lieutenant commander of the same branch in the department of Valenciennes.

From Marie-Madeleine Aubert de Boisguiet, he had two children: Louise-Armande, baptized in Oizé on 18 September 1769, who inherited Montaupin by order of succession. She first married on 1 May 1788, Count Pierre-Étienne de L'Hermitte, lord of Mesnil-Guyon, La Mazure, La Cheverie, Champhays, Knight of Saint Louis and captain in the regiment of La Fère. She remarried around 1800 to Henri-François Le Moine. Their daughter, Augustine-Louise-Madeleine, born in Le Mans in the parish of Saint-Nicolas on 21 February 1772, married Jean-François-Marie d'Alexandre on 5 July 1791, an officer in the regiment of Chartres-Infantry, son of Antoine d'Alexandre, knight, and Amable Philibé. She became a widow on 24 April 1805, due to an accident.

On 14 February 1752, Louis-Auguste Le Roy, Knight of Saint Louis, lord of Montaupin, Beaumont, la Place, Yvré-le-Pôlin, and extraordinary artillery commissioner at Port-Louis, married in second marriage at the age of 27 and a half, Marie-Thérèse de Moloré, daughter of Gabriel-René de Moloré, lord of Villaines, president of the election of Le Mans, and Anne-Renée de Belleriant, in the church of Savigné-l'Evêque.

He lost his first wife early and, having also lost Anne-Louise-Thérèse Le Roy, the only child from his relationship with Marie-Thérèse de Moloré (born in Le Mans on 11 September 1753), he remarried on 3 May 1768. At that time, he was brigade chief of the artillery corps in the regiment of Strasbourg. He married the Marquise Louise-Marguerite de Montesson, widow of Jean-Armand, knight, Marquis de Raffetanges. She was the daughter of Louis-Pierre Joseph de Montesson, knight and lord of Douillet, and Marguerite-Renée Le Silleur.

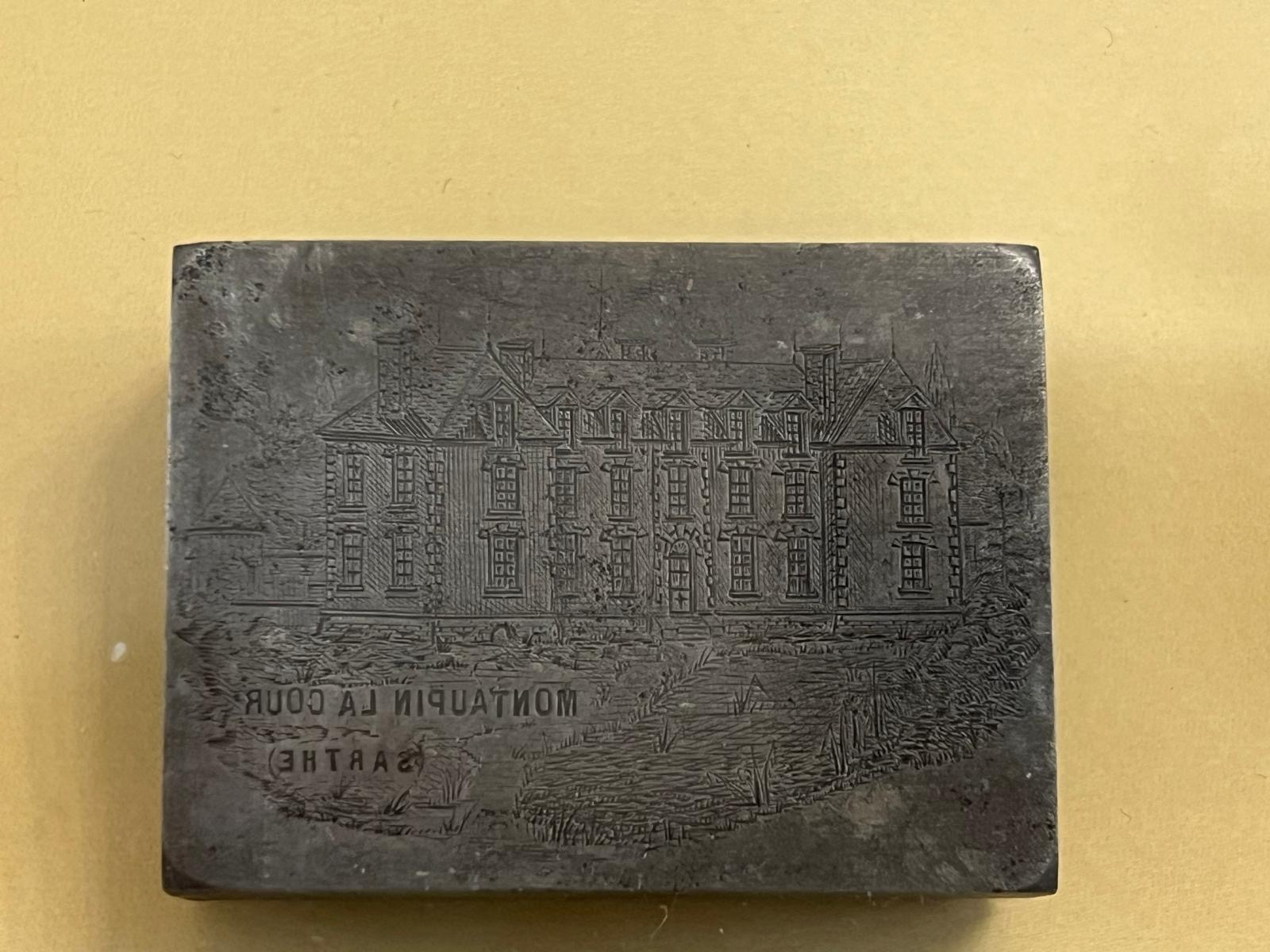
Seal of the Lords of Montaupin, 18th century

His wife died on 28 February 1772, and he died on 3 June 1788.

On 19 July 1791, Louise-Armande Le Roy de Montaupin and her husband Pierre-Étienne de L'Hermitte obtained by a notarial act of succession two-thirds of the inheritance. This act was drawn up before René-Julien Le Blaye and Julien Dioré, notaries at Oizé and Sougé-le-Ganelon. They received for their part the estate and domain of Montaupin, the farms of La Teisserie, Verreille, and La Place. They also inherited the farms Grassin, La Roche, and Beaumont, the small farms of La Clérissière and La Foucherie, as well as the mills of Mocque-Souris and Boisard. Finally, they received between eighty and one hundred journals of fir plantations or coppiced woods at La Verrie, as well as a financial sum in the form of annuities.

Augustine-Louise-Madeleine Le Roy and her husband Jean-François-Marie d'Alexandre had rights to the other third, which consisted of the farms La Bussonnière and La Petite-Chapelle, in Sougé-le-Ganelon, two houses on Rue du Puits-de-Quatre-Roues, in Le Mans, and a financial sum.

The French Revolution of 1789 saw armed conflicts spread beyond Paris to various French regions. Part of the château was burned and another part destroyed.

The husband of Louise-Armande Le Roy de L'Hermitte, then Dame of Montaupin, was a second-in-command officer in the artillery of the Army of the Coasts of Cherbourg under Wimpffen and became one of the main leaders of the Chouannerie in Sarthe. He was killed at Saint-Denis-d'Orques after the pacification, in April 1795, during an encounter with the "Blues," republican troops opposing the "Whites," royalist troops, during the civil war of the Chouannerie from 1792 to 1800.

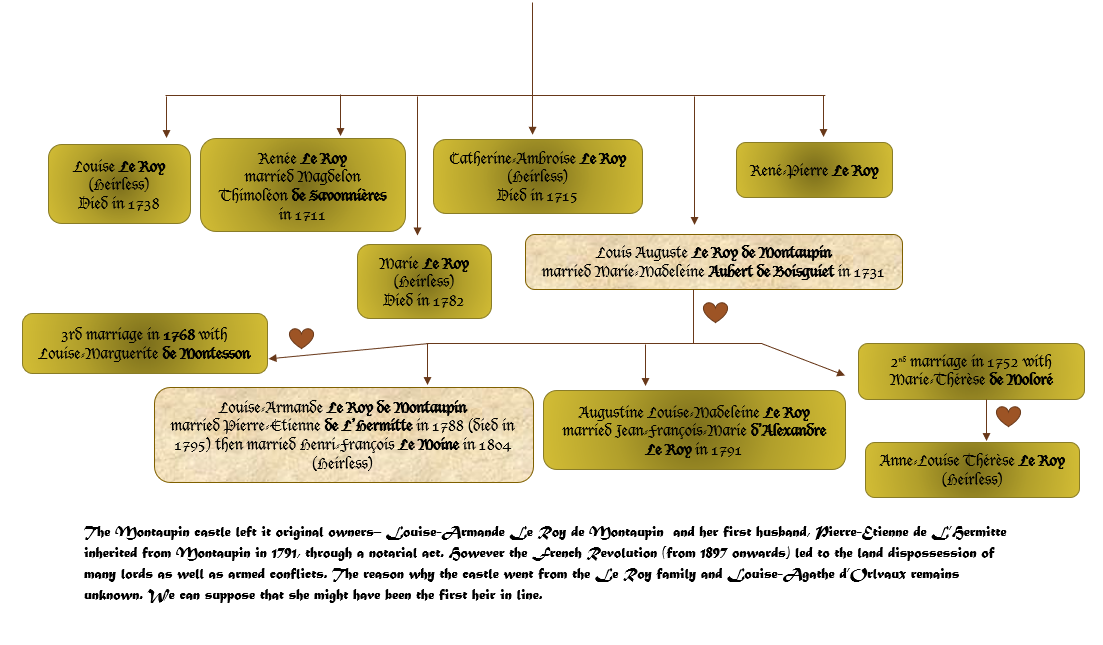
The family tree of Montaupin - Le Roy

=== The Montaupin castle in the 19th century ===
==== The Le Roy family (continued) ====
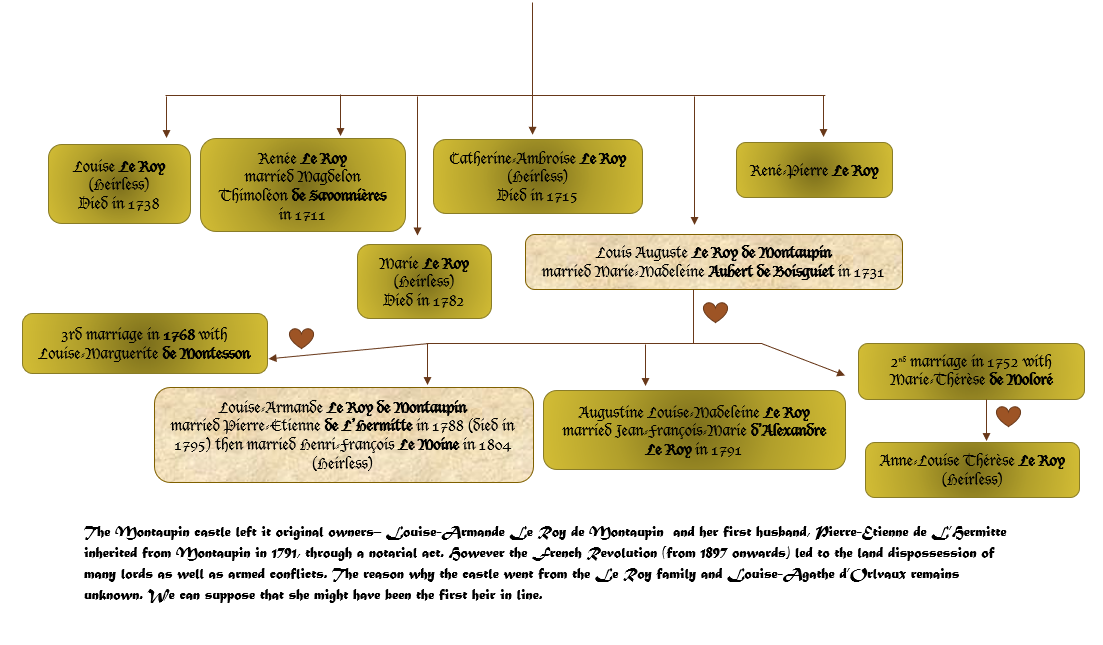
Genealogical tree of the Le Roy family; credits to the creators of this page.

It can thus be assumed that this conflict led to the destruction of part of the castle, followed by its later reconstruction by the family of La Porte de la Thébaudière de Sainte-Gemme.

On 2 March 1804, Louise Armande Le Roy de Montaupin married, for the second time, Henri François Le Moine, who died in 1826.

The castle then disappeared from records, only to reappear in 1827, when it was sold by the heirs of Louis-François d'Arlanges and his wife, Louise-Agathe d'Orlvaux, to the mayor of Oizé, Count Ambroise de La Porte de la Thébaudière de Sainte-Gemme.

The connection between the Le Roy de Montaupin family and Louise-Agathe d'Orlvaux remains unclear. It is likely that she was the closest heir in the line of succession, which would have allowed her to recover the property after the confiscation of noble estates and the upheavals of the French Revolution. It is also possible that her prestigious name played a role in the allocation of this castle, adjacent to her lands, during the Restoration period. This acquisition may also be linked to successive sales during that time.

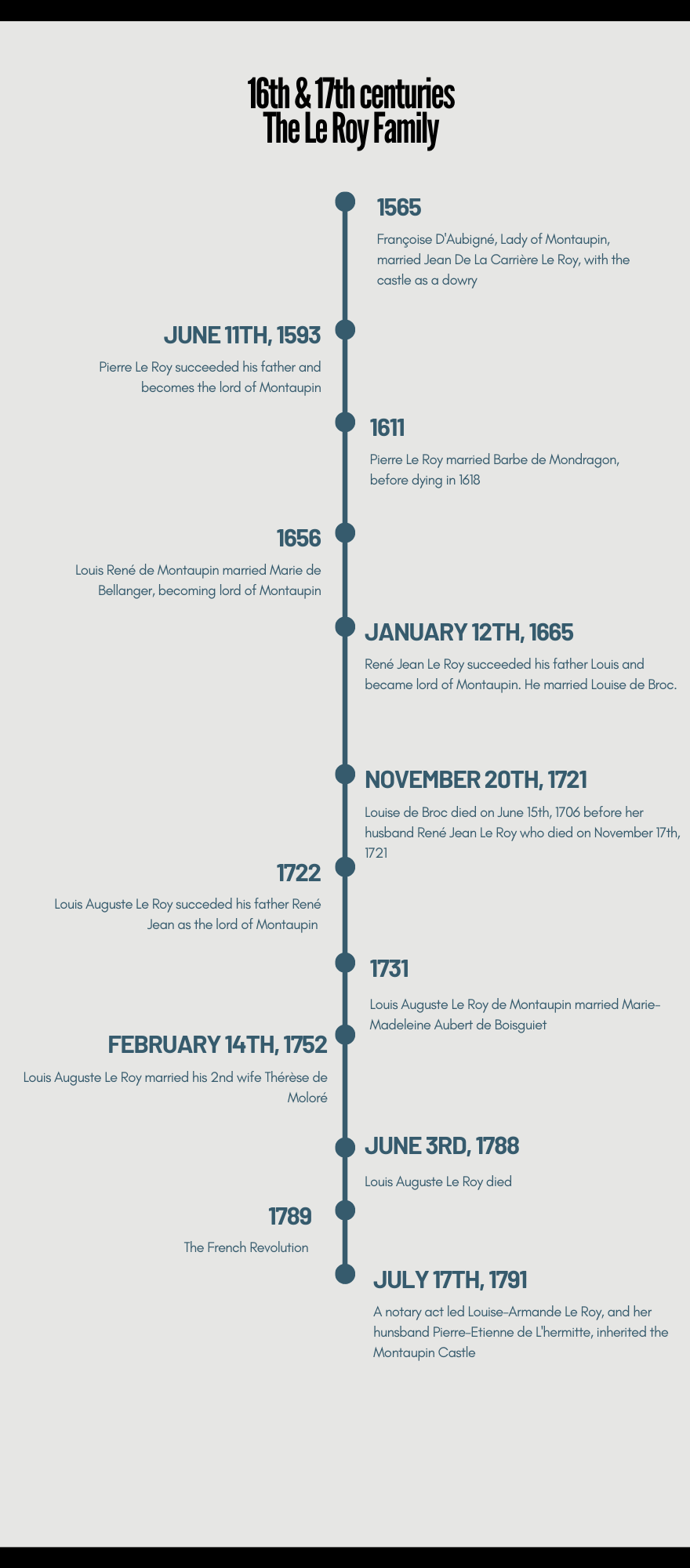
Timeline of the Le Roy family in Montaupin

==== The D'Arlanges family ====
Louise-Agathe d'Orvaulx, daughter of Louis-Philippe-François, Count of Orvaulx, brought the Château de Montaupin as a dowry to her husband Louis-François d'Arlanges upon their marriage on 28 February 1799. From this union, five children were born. Their eldest daughter, Marie-Louise-Zoé d'Arlanges, born in 1800, married Charles-André-Auguste de la Voyrie on 17 May 1821. A former officer of the royal navy, he distinguished himself by his military deeds and loyalty during the Wars of the Vendée. The couple had two daughters. Adolphe-Louis-Gaston d'Arlanges was born on 7 April 1802, while Eugène-Louis-Gaston d'Arlanges, born on 7 March 1806, later married Nathalie Morisson de la Bassetière, with whom he had three daughters. Adèle-Charlotte-Agathe d'Arlanges, born in 1804, died in 1820, and Marie-Armande d'Arlanges, born 10 July 1807, died in infancy.

Upon the death of Louis-François d'Arlanges in 1827, Marie-Louise-Zoé d'Arlanges and her husband Charles-André-Auguste de la Voyrie inherited their parents' estate. That same year, they sold the property, including the château and its lands, to the Marquis of Saint-Gemme.

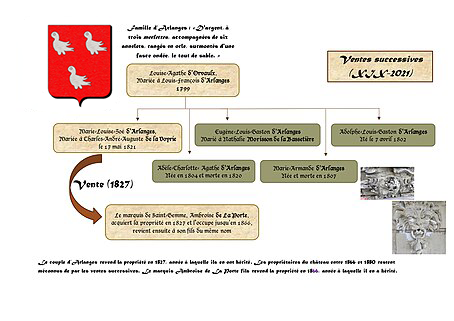
Account of successive sales; with thanks to the creators of this page.

==== The de La Porte de la Thébaudière de Sainte-Gemme family ====
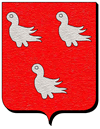
Coat of arms of the de La Porte de la Thébaudière family

Mr. Ambroise de La Porte de la Thébaudière de Sainte-Gemme was born on 19 August 1793, and died on 12 February 1866. The Count de La Porte de la Thébaudière de Sainte-Gemme was a renowned farmer and mayor of Oizé. He resided in the château from 1830 to 1866 and operated the lands as a large farm with award-winning agricultural crops.

Upon his death in 1866, the property passed to his eldest son, Count Ambroise de La Thébaudière, born on 17 July 1833, and deceased on 20 December 1912, who later sold it by public auction.

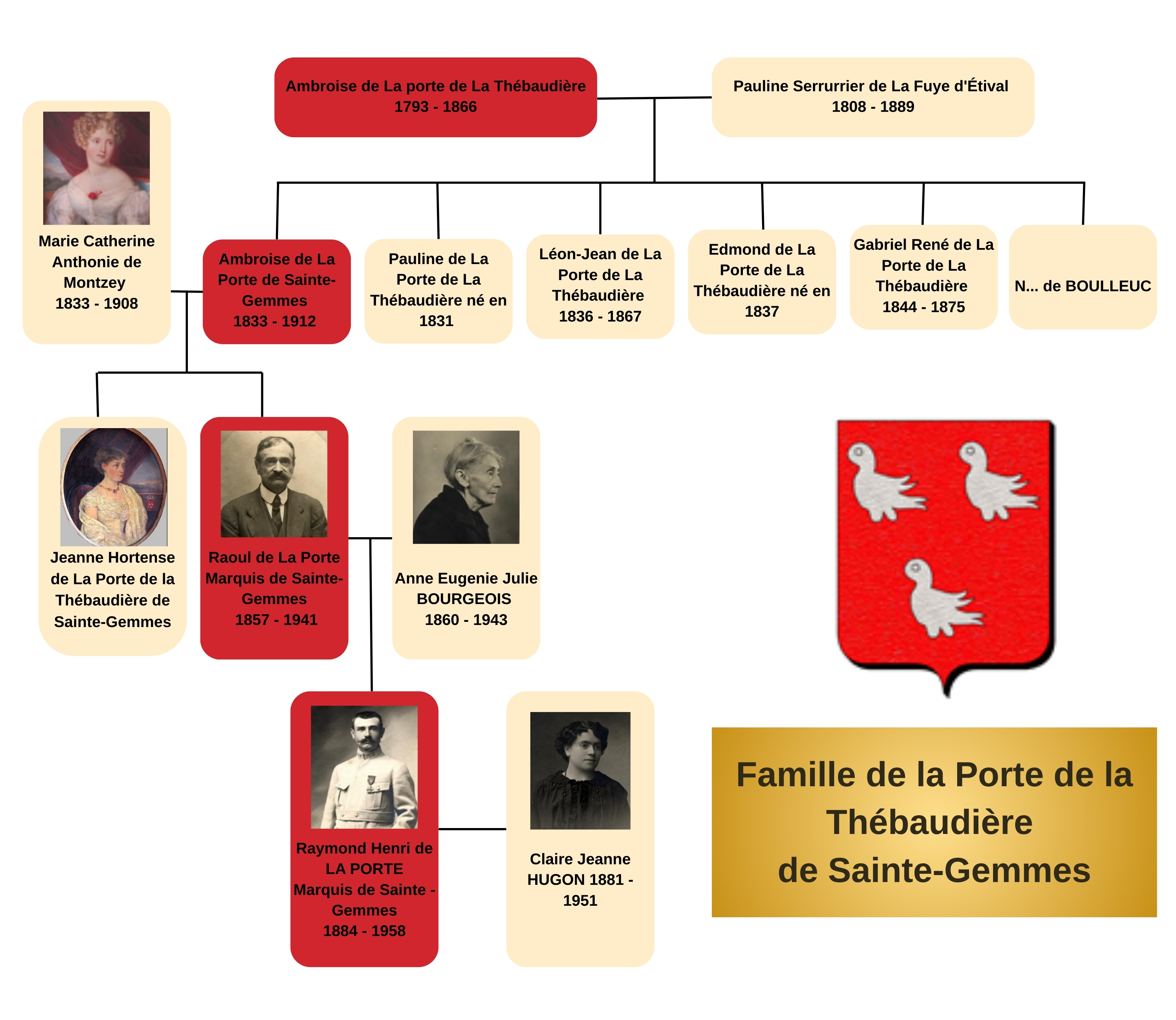

==== Successive sales of property ====
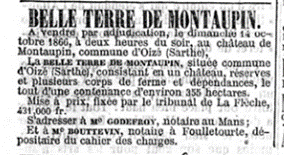

The property then disappears from records, and the sequence of successive sales remains unclear. The Château de Montaupin changed ownership multiple times over short periods during the 19th and 20th centuries. The Franco-Prussian War of 1870–1871, marked by the occupation of the Sarthe region, may have influenced this situation.

Mr. Vrament acquired the property in 1880 before reselling it in 1888. The château and its outbuildings (58 hectares) were sold to Mr. Cureau, a well-traveled art collector, while the lands were sold to Messrs. Piedor, Dupuy, Sacré, and Le Bled. In 2025, the paintings from 1881 acquired by Mr. Cureau were restored and are now displayed in the wood-paneled salon.

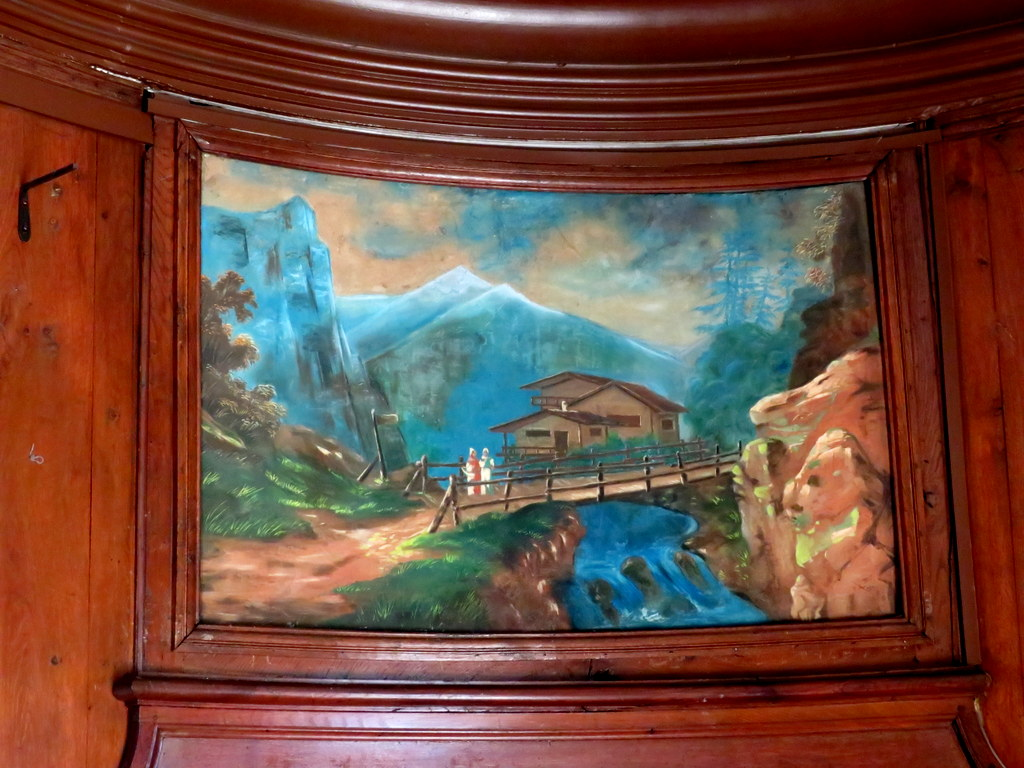
Japan in the 19th century

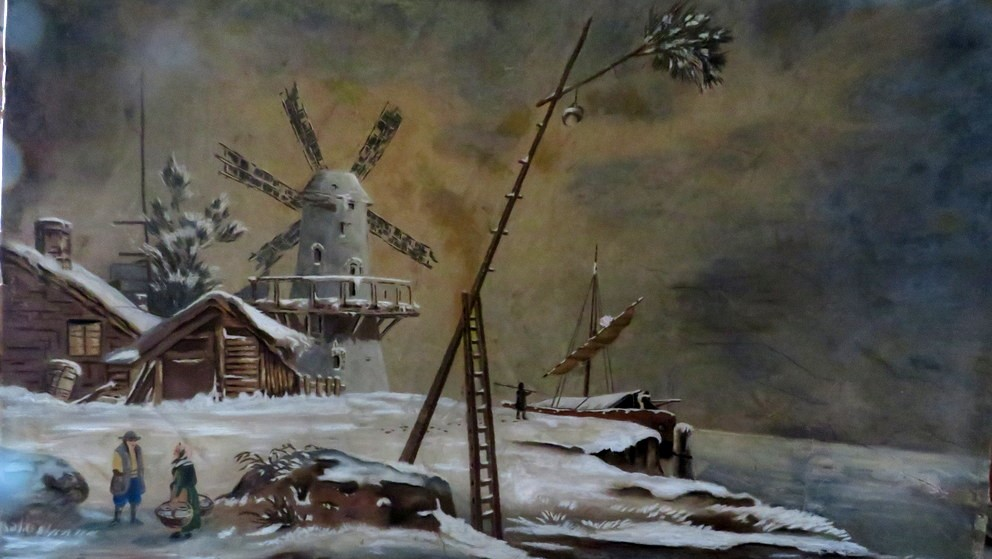
The Netherlands in the 19th century

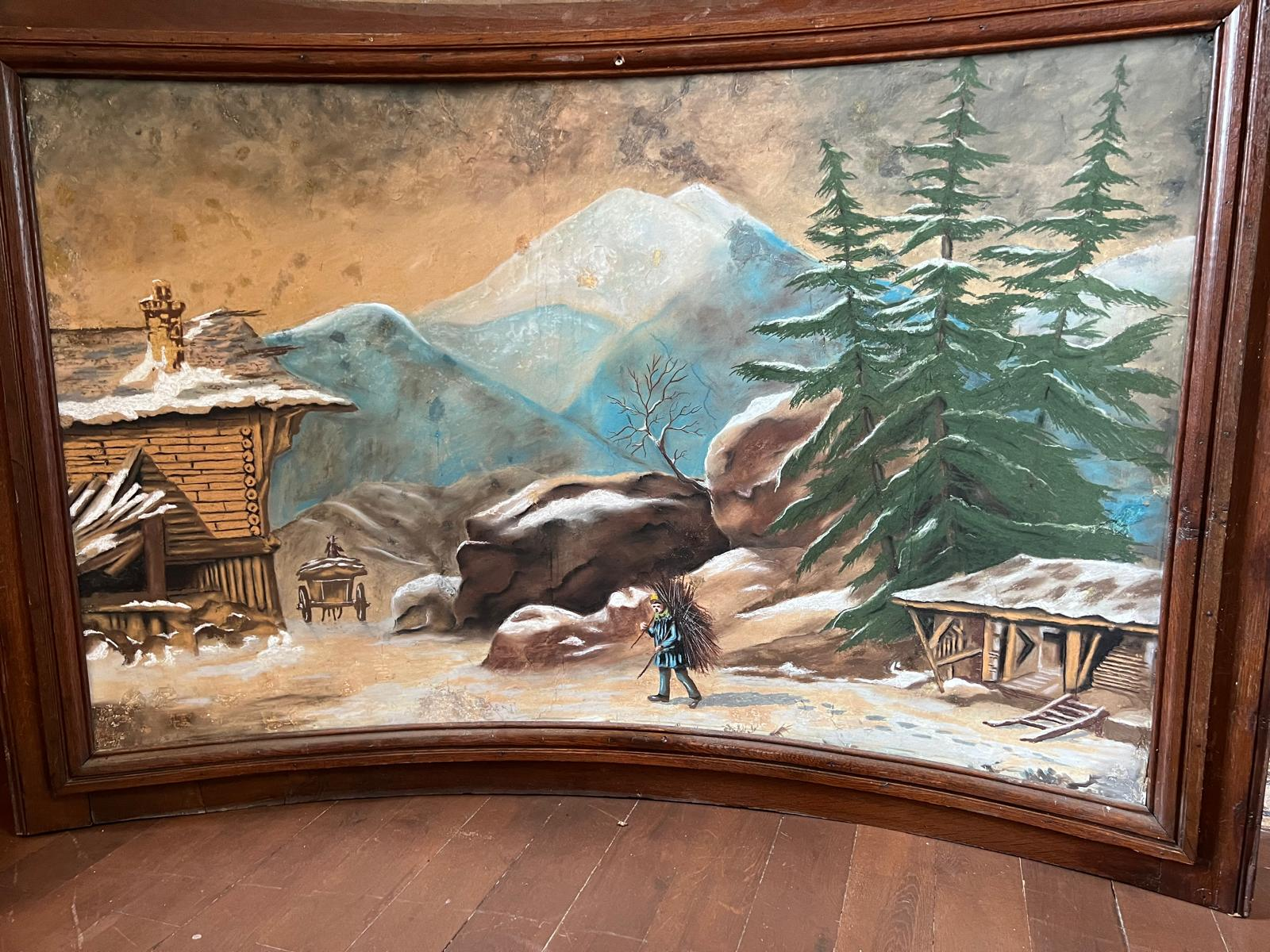
Russia in the 19th century

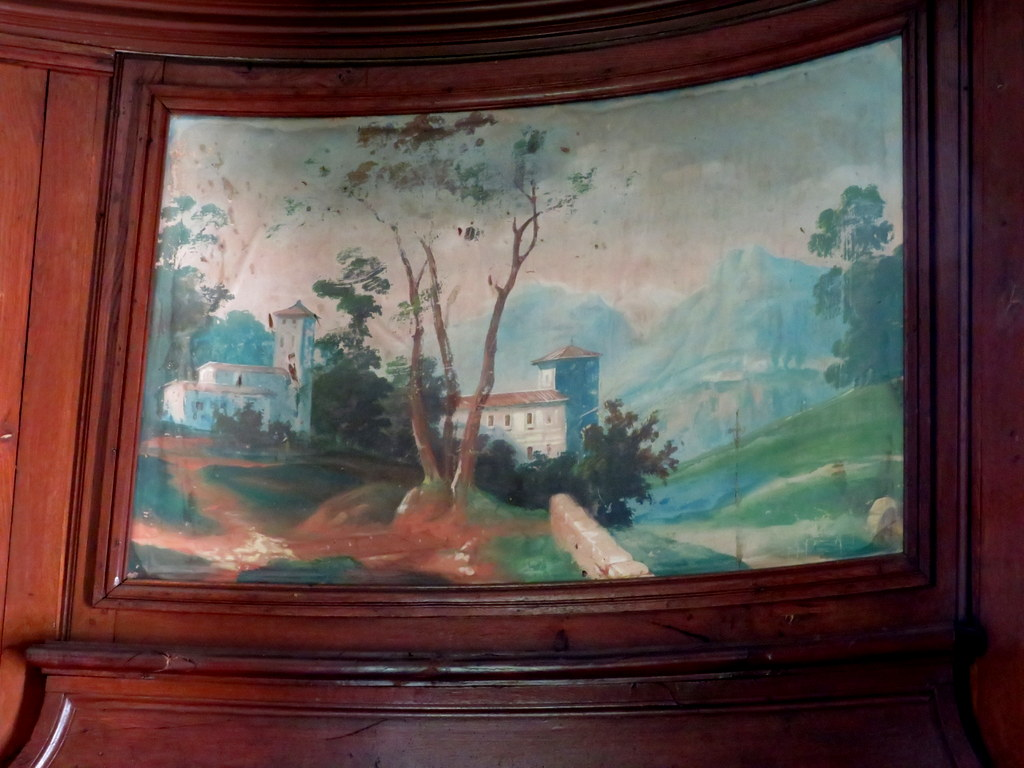
Tuscany in the 19th century

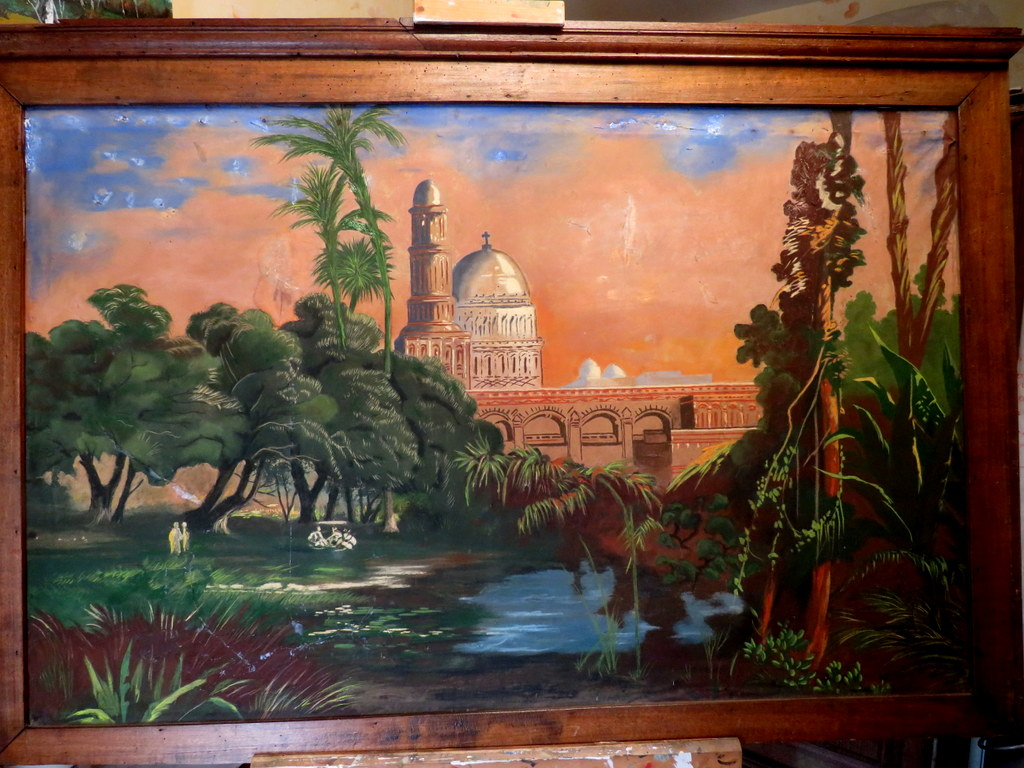
The Ottoman Empire in the 19th century

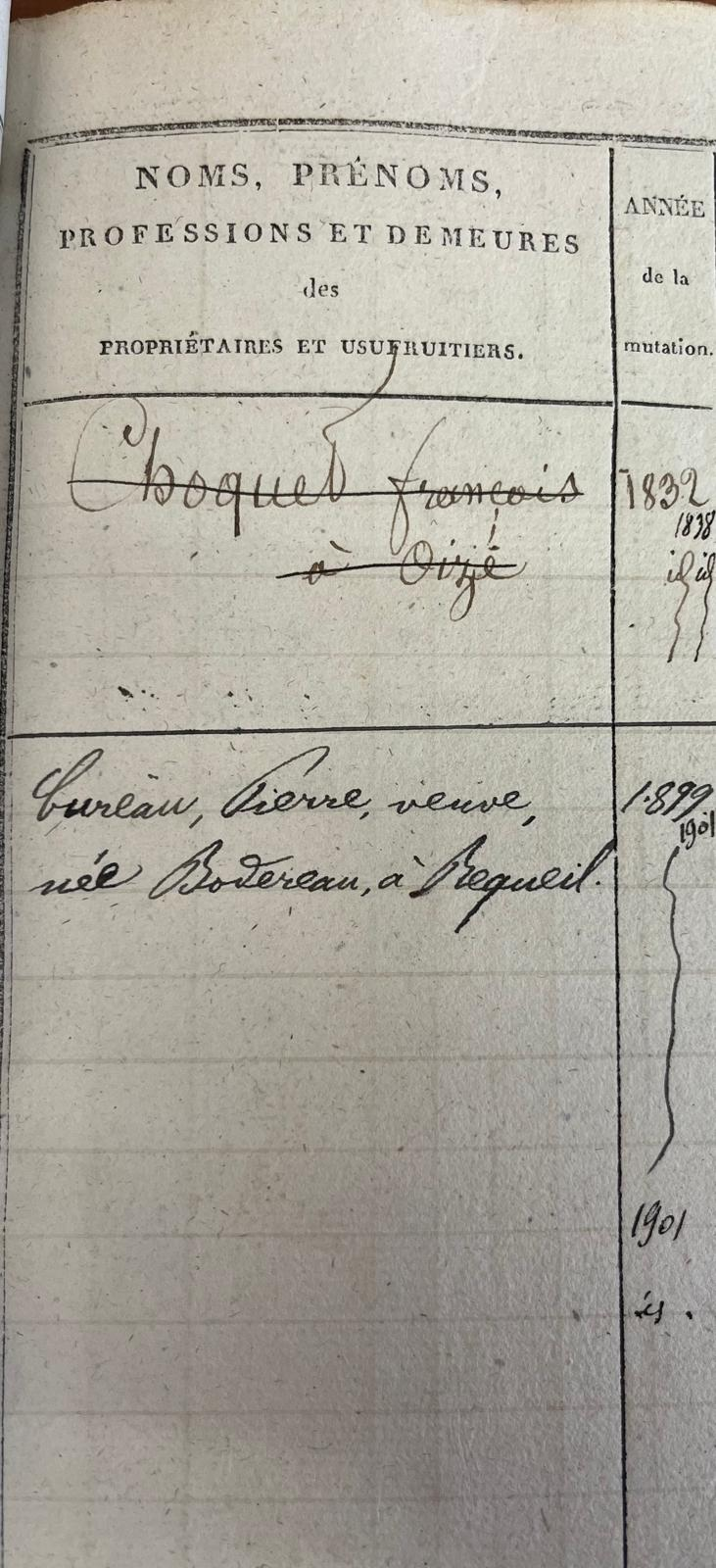
Document sourced from the municipal archives.

The property changed hands again, before reappearing in 1900.

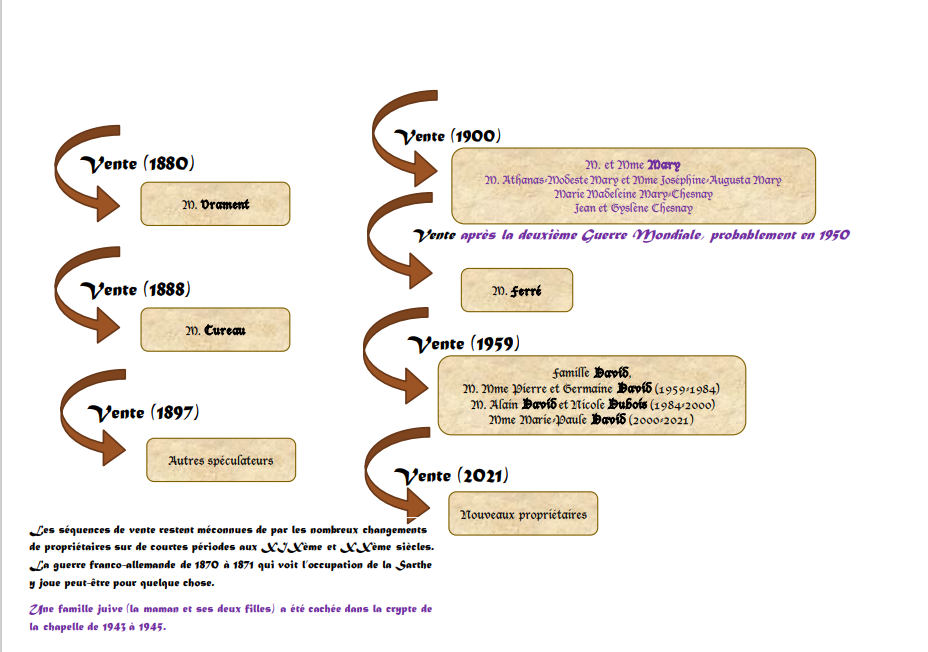
Chronology of successive sales of the château — credits to the creators of this page

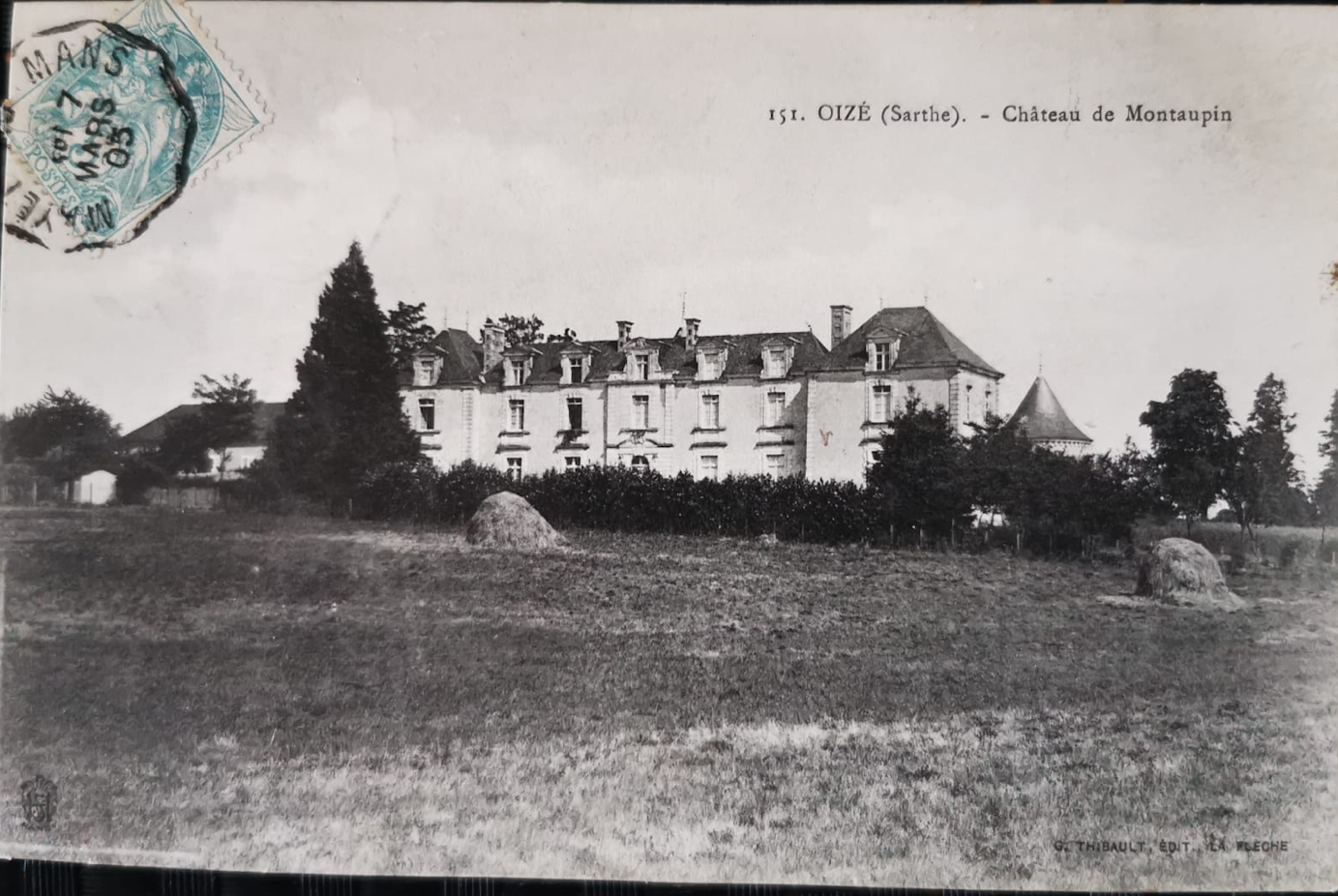
Photograph of Château de Montaupin and the turret of the Sainte Marie-Madeleine chapel, postcard stamped 5 March 1905.

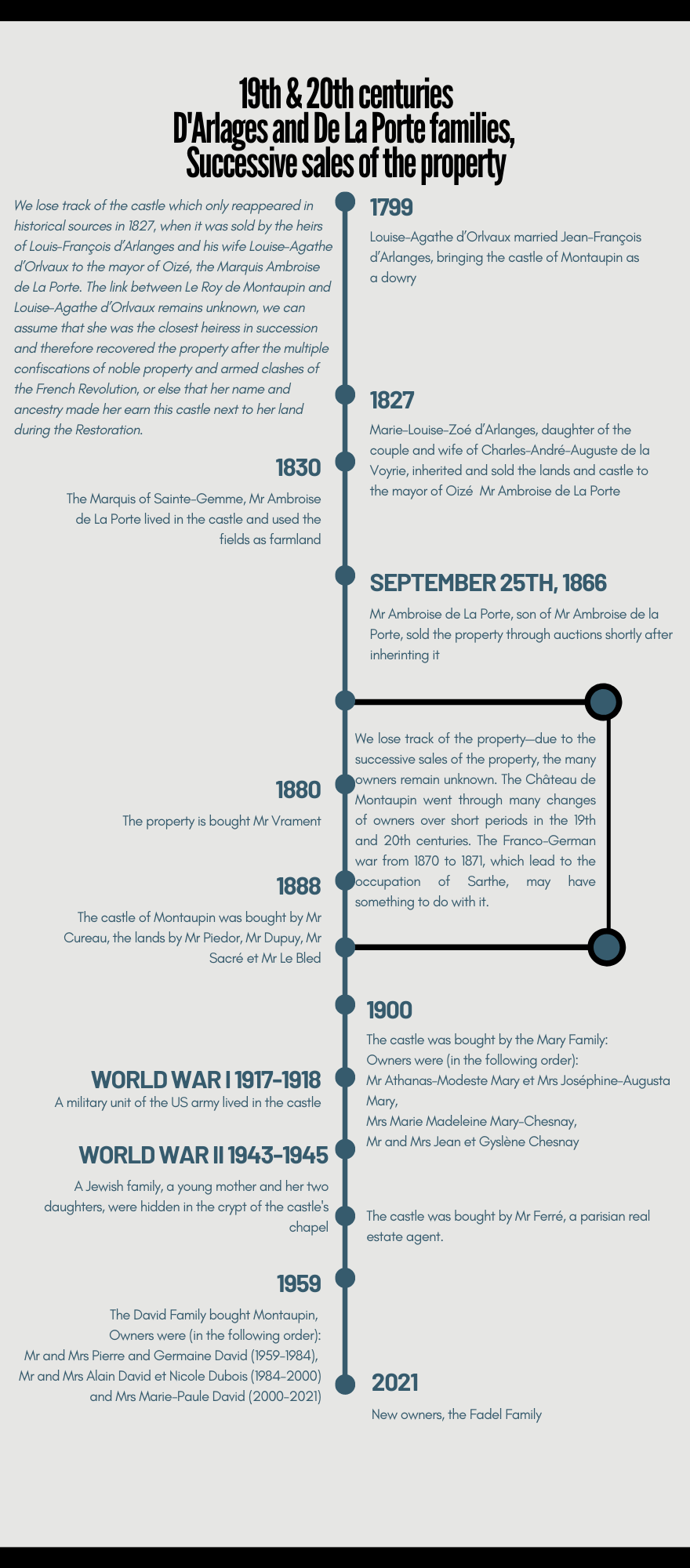
Timeline of successive owners of Montaupin from the 19th to the 21st century; credits to the creators of this page

In 1917, during the First World War, the Château de Montaupin served as a lodging site for soldiers, notably American troops who had come to reinforce the Allied forces. These servicemen were stationed there for over 11 months before being sent to the front lines.

In 1917, during the First World War, the Château de Montaupin served as a lodging site for soldiers, notably American troops who had come to reinforce the Allied forces. These servicemen were stationed there for over 11 months before being sent to the front lines.

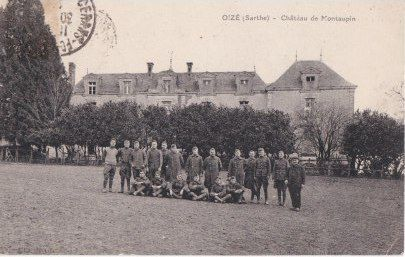
American soldiers stationed at the Château de Montaupin in 1917.

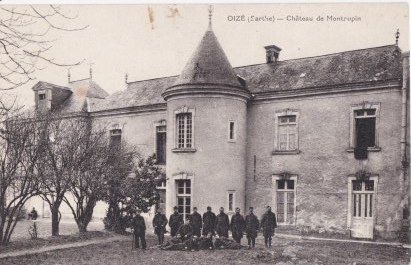

Period documents, including several excerpts from soldier booklets, confirm their presence at the château. These archives provide detailed information about the units involved, the dates of their stay, and the conditions of their accommodation.

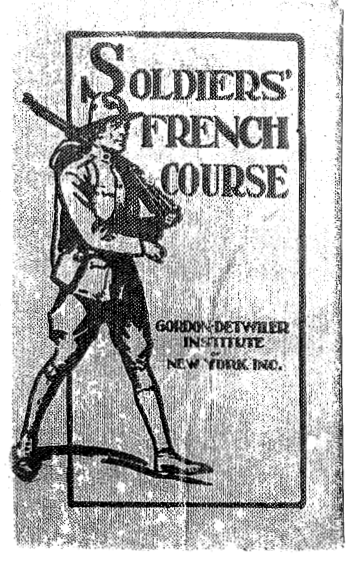
Cover of the American soldier's booklet (English and French)

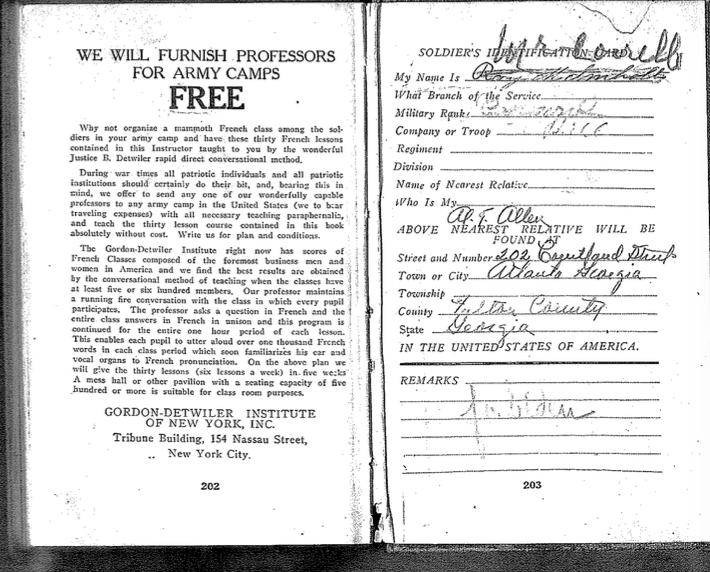
Pages from the soldier's booklet from Atlanta, Georgia, United States

=== The Château de Montaupin in the 20th century ===
==== The Mary Family ====
Starting from 1915, the château has belonged to the family of Mary Athanase-Modeste and Joséphine-Augusta Mary (born Maissin), who passed it down to their two daughters: Geneviève Mary, who married into the Bataille family, and Louise Madeleine Mary, who married into the Chesnais family.

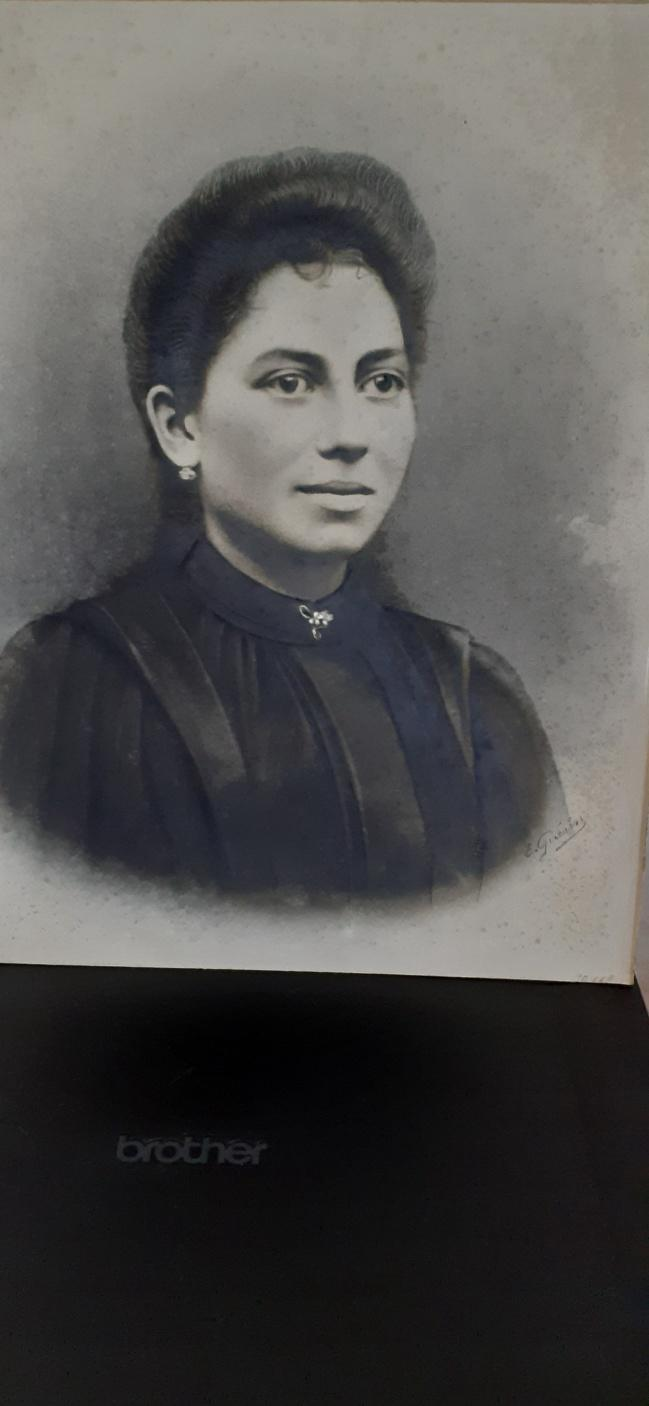
Photo portrait of Mrs. Joséphine-Augustra Mary (1873-1953)

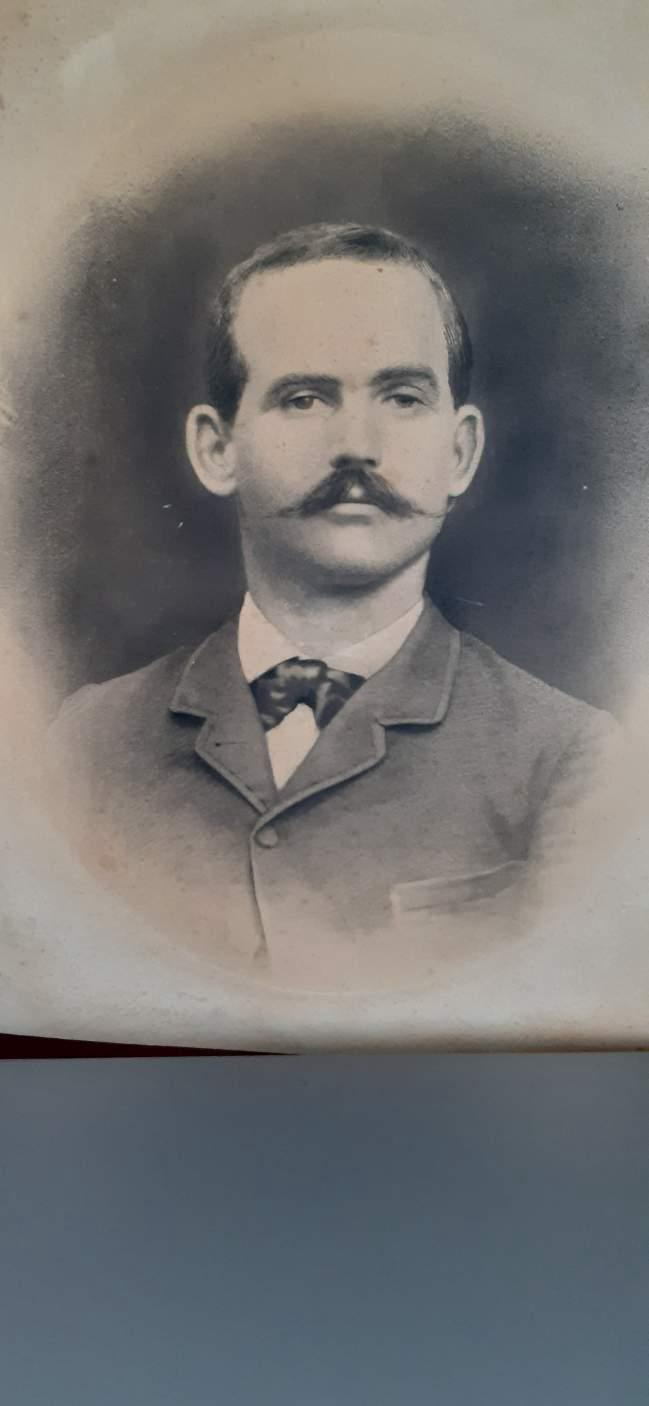
Photo portrait of M. Athanase-Modeste Mary (deceased on the 7th of May 1943)

They then passed it on to their two daughters: Geneviève MARY, wife of Bataille, and Louise Madeleine MARY, wife of Chesnais.

The château was sold in 1957 to Mr. Ferré, a real estate dealer based in Le Mans, and then in 1959 to the David family. Pierre and Germaine David owned the property from 1959 to 1967, before Alain David and Nicole Dubois succeeded them from 1984 to 2000.

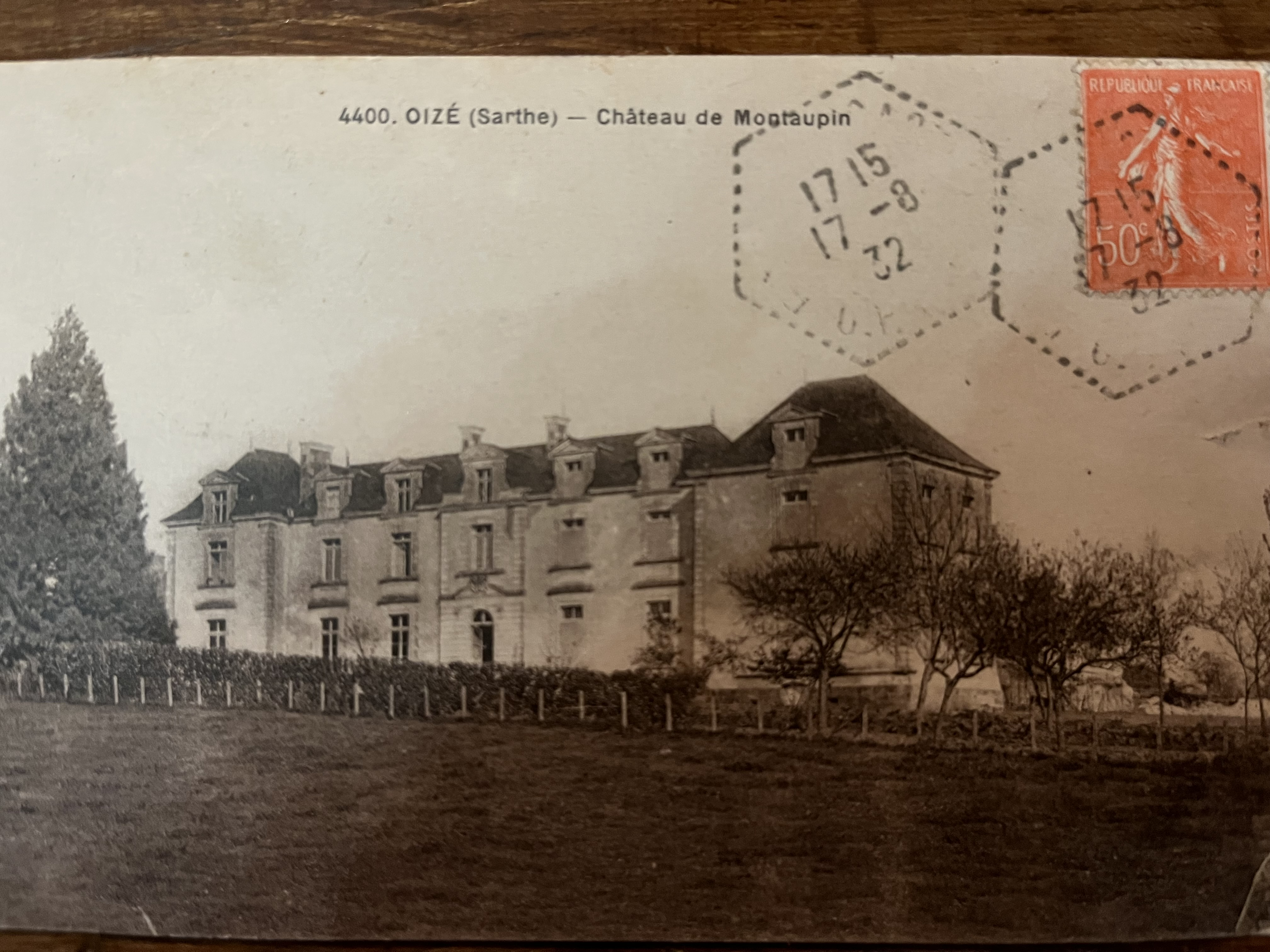
Photograph of the chapel, which disappeared before 1942. The crypt still remains.

=== The Château de Montaupin in the 21st century ===
==== The David Family ====
The castle was still owned by Mrs Marie-Paule David, from 2000 to 2021.

==== The Fadel Family ====
The Fadel Family is now the owner of the castle. They have entirely renovated The Château de Montaupin, which is currently used as a guesthouse and a country cottage. The association Les Amis de Montaupin was created in 2025 and works to promote the castle through cultural activities.

== Heraldry ==
The Château de Montaupin, a witness to local history and the legacy of several noble lineages, stands out for the heraldic richness of its former owning families. Each coat of arms tells a story, reflecting alliances, titles, and influence over the centuries. The table below presents the coats of arms of the various families who owned Montaupin, offering insight into their visual identity and their place in the region's heraldic history.

Family	Heraldry	Heraldic description
Du Bouchet family	Du Bouschet – heraldry	Argent, two bars sable; azure semé of fleurs-de-lis argent, accompanied by a lion — symbols of courage and nobility. The escutcheon is quartered and divided into six horizontal bands (fesswise).
D'Aubigné family	D'Aubigné heraldry	Gules, a lion ermine armed, langued and crowned Or. The escutcheon is of modern French shape.
Le Roy family	Le Roy – Heraldry	The escutcheon is in lozenge shape, as used by ladies, with a gules field and lozenge-shaped rebattements. It features a griffin as its charge.
De La Porte de la Thébaudière de Sainte-Gemme family	De La Porte de la Thébaudière de Sainte-Gemme family heraldry De La Porte de la Thébaudière de Sainte-Gemme family heraldry	Argent, three martlets in orle, surmounted by a fess wavy, all sable. The escutcheon is fesswise and wavy.

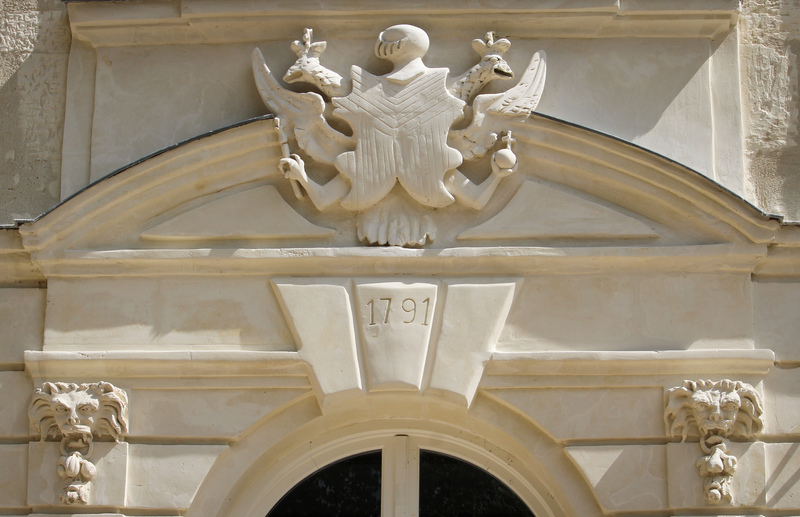
The coat of arms on the château's central gate features a knight in the center, flanked by two crowned eagles—one holding a globus cruciger (a globe surmounted by a cross) in its talons, the other bearing a sprig of myrtle.

== The park of Montaupin ==
The park of the Château de Montaupin covers more than one hectare.

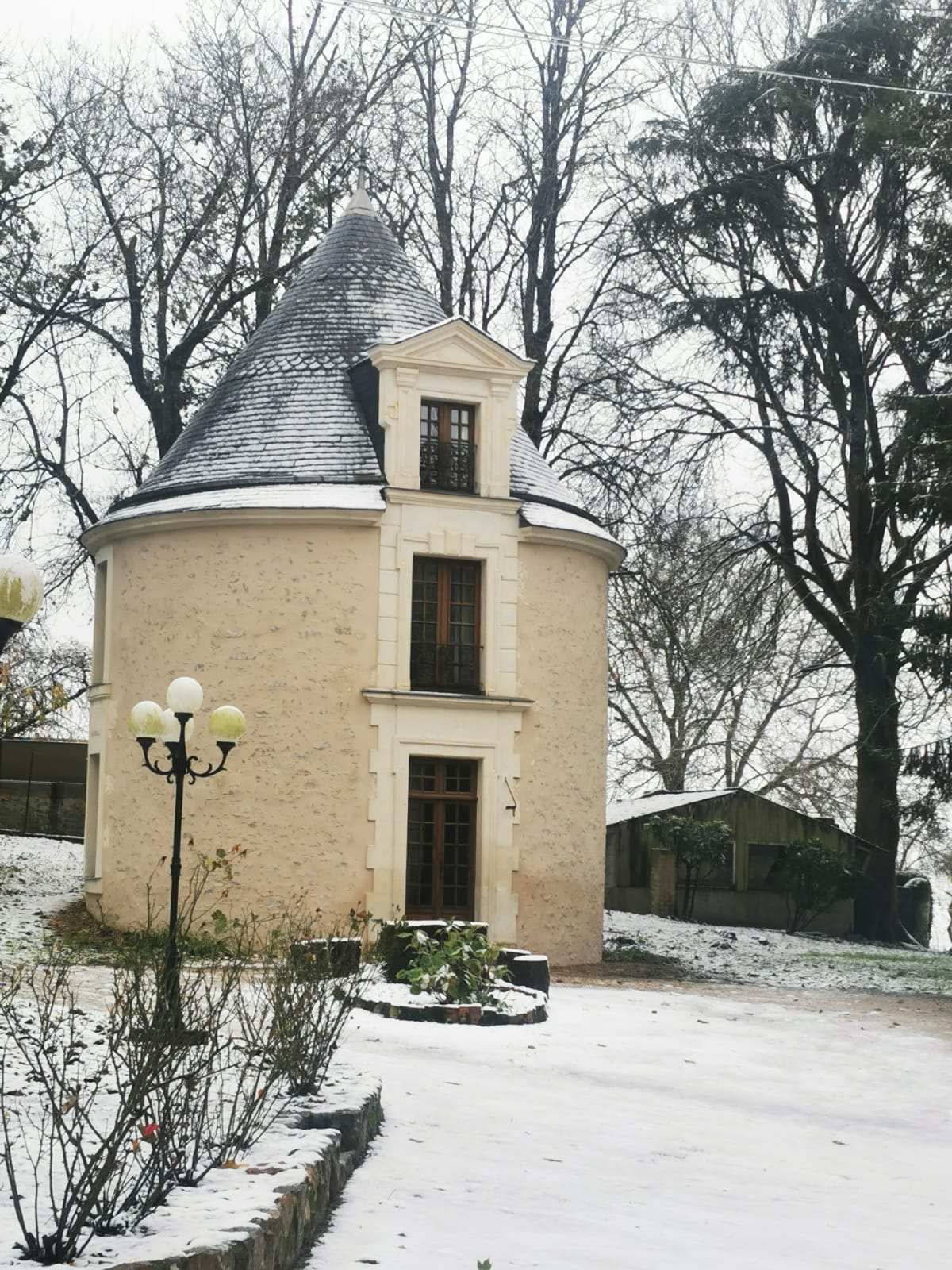
Photograph of the turret, Winter 2025

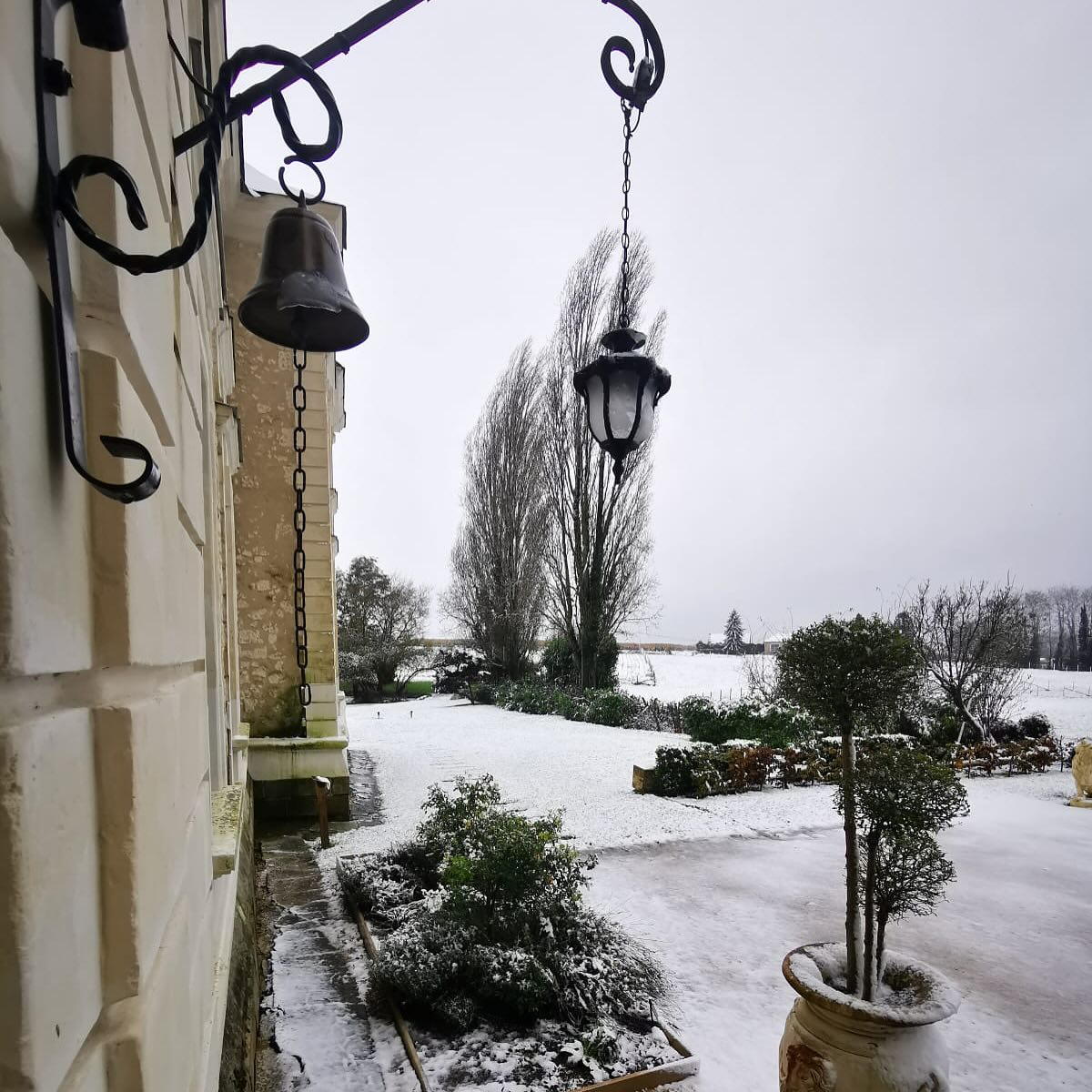
Château de Montaupin in the snow, winter 2025

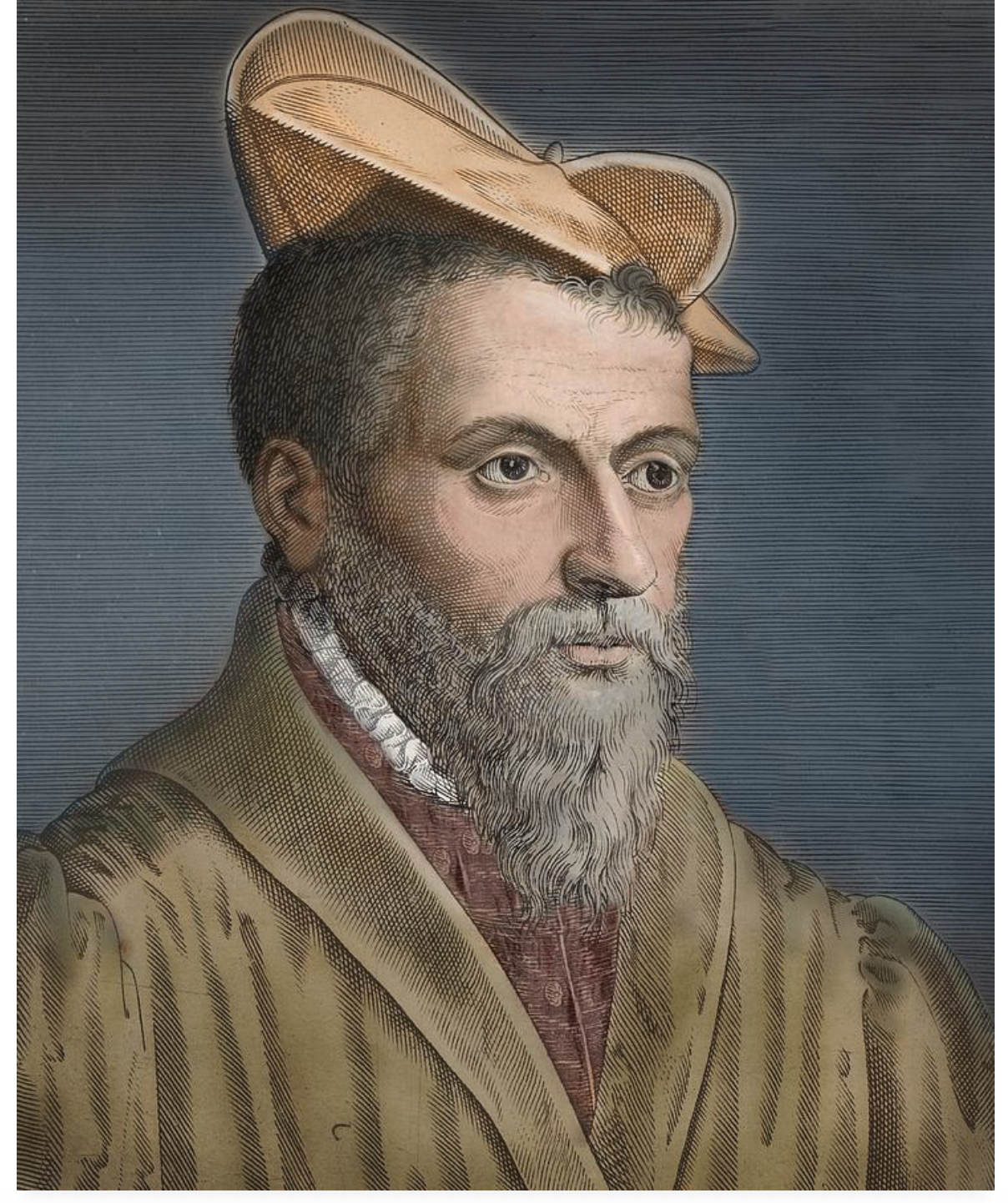
Portrait of the naturalist painter Pierre Belon

It's home to a five-century-old cedar, with a trunk almost 10 meters in circumference, whose seeds are said to have been brought from the Orient by naturalist Pierre Belon, born in 1517 at La Souletière, on the border between Oizé and Cérans-Foulletourte. It was Belon who introduced various exotic plants to France, paying particular attention to their medicinal properties.

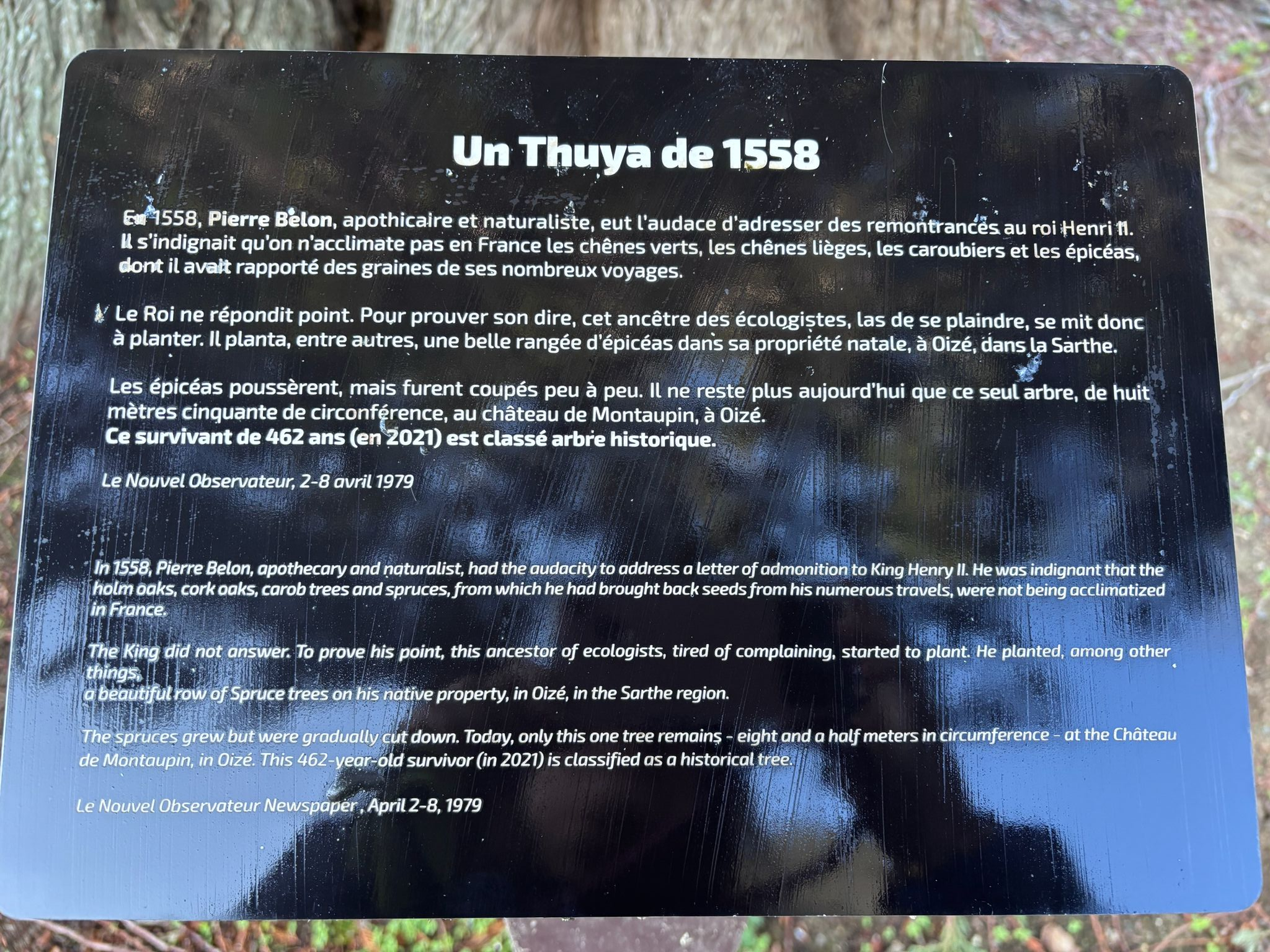
A descriptive sign about the thuja tree at the Château de Montaupin .

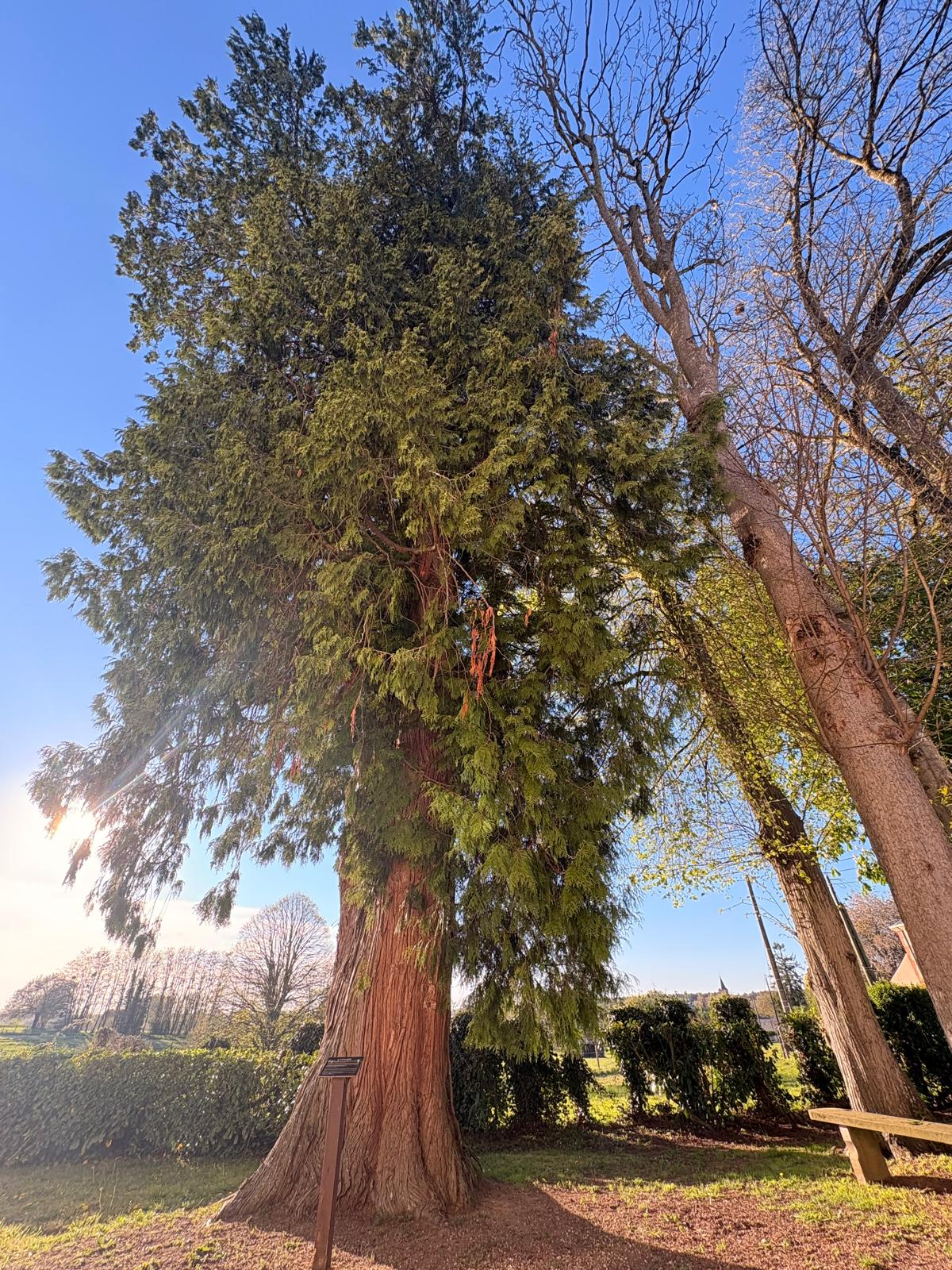
Thuja from the Château de Montaupin planted by Pierre Belon.

=== The castle's garden ===
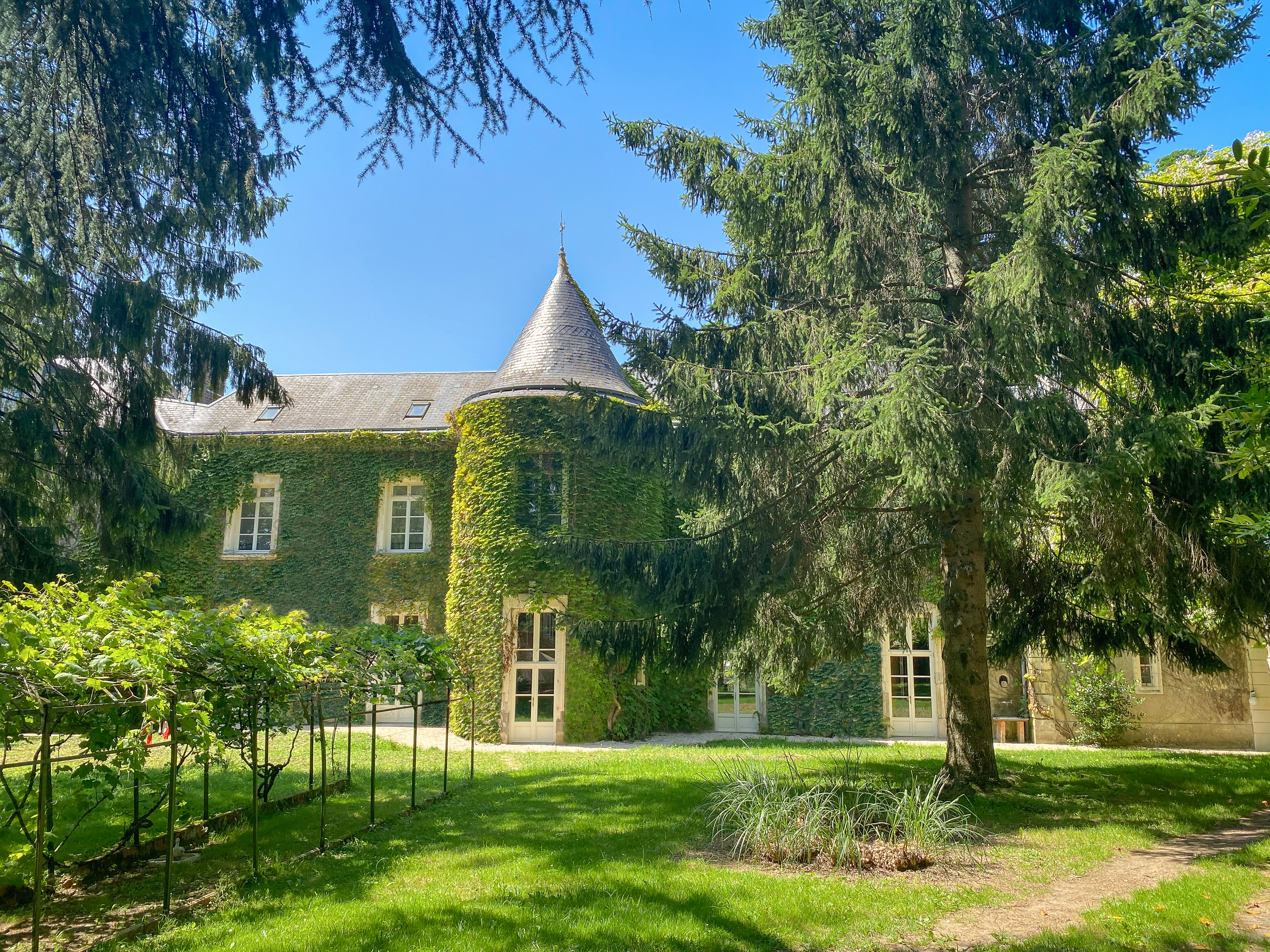
The Castle's front

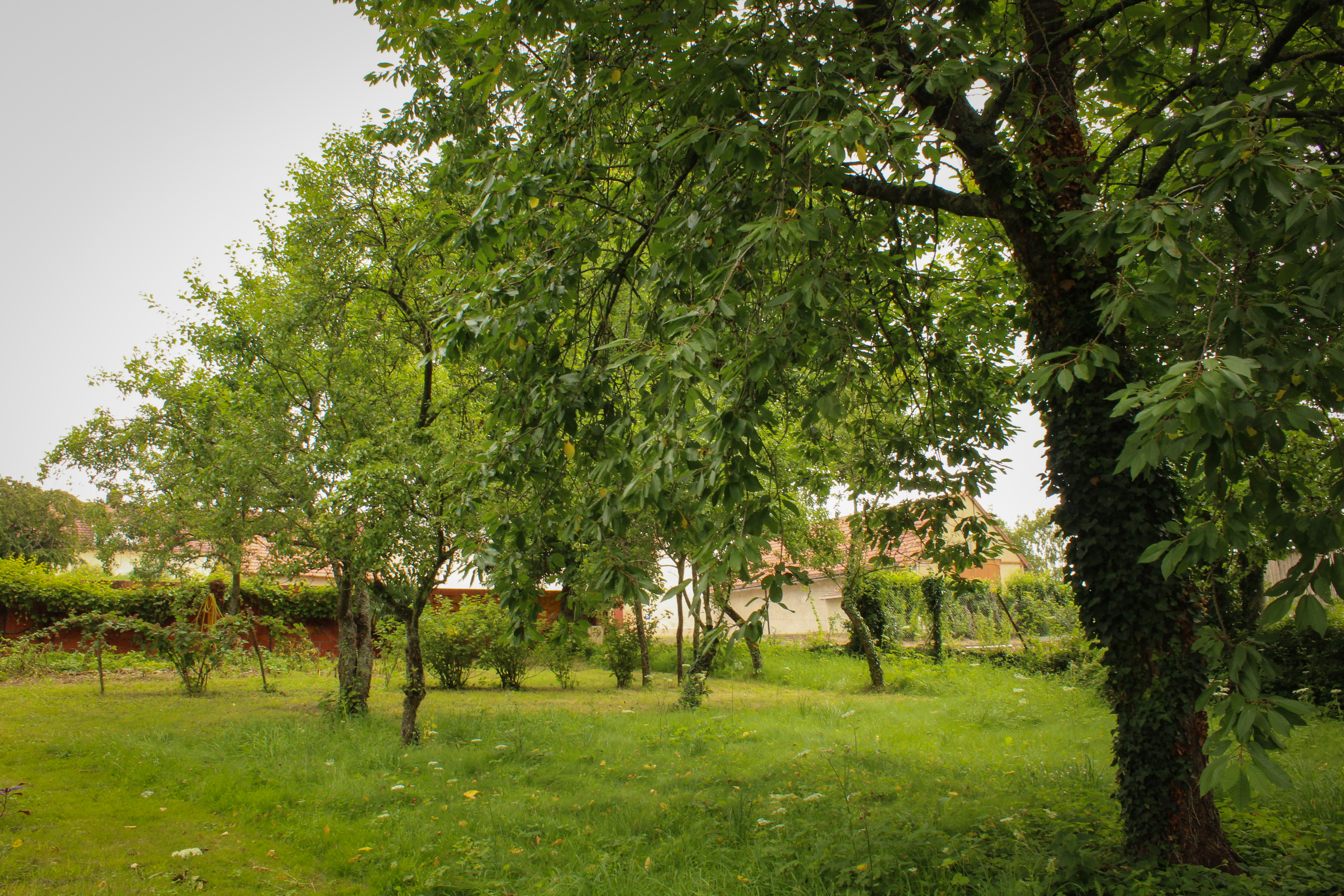
The vegetable garden

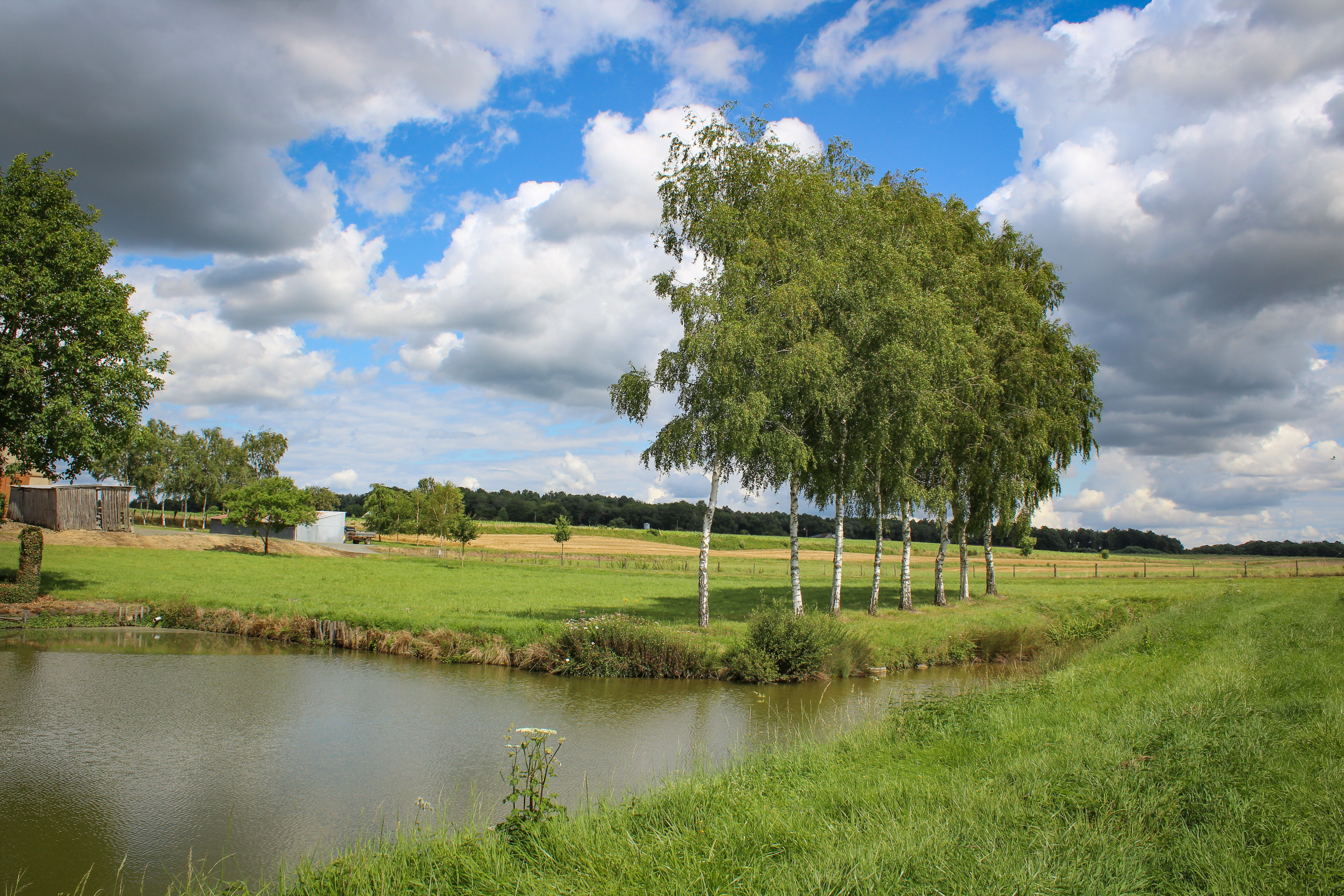
The moat

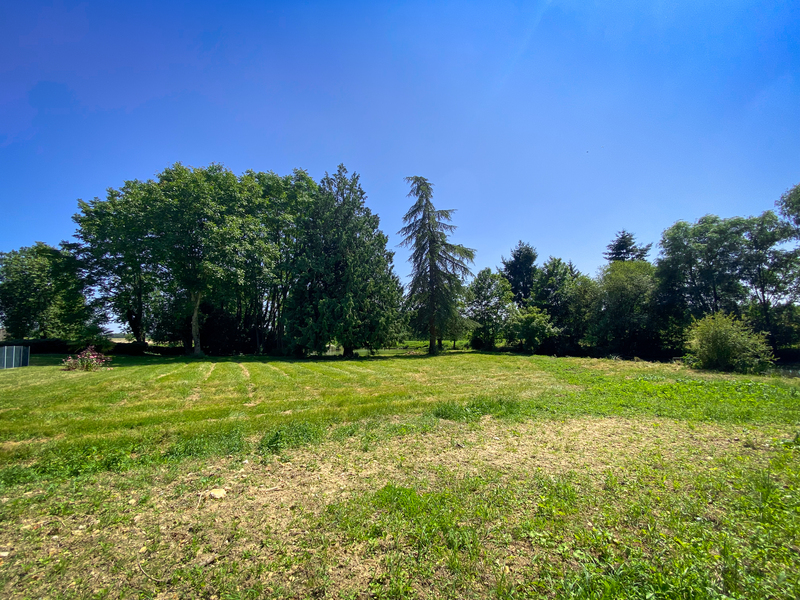
The park

The park consists of imported plants and other common to the landscape of the region. There are a multitude of trees and fruit trees there: firs, cedars, chestnut trees, Italian poplars, walnut trees, apple trees, palm trees, cherry trees, pear trees and plum trees. The Park also has a large floral garden with a variety of roses, vines, tulips, hyacinths, daffodils, lilies of the valley, reed beds and irises growing near the pond. There are also mints and red fruit bushes, mulberries, raspberries, blackcurrants and currants. Refurbished, it now contains a secure swimming pool surrounded by this abundant vegetation.

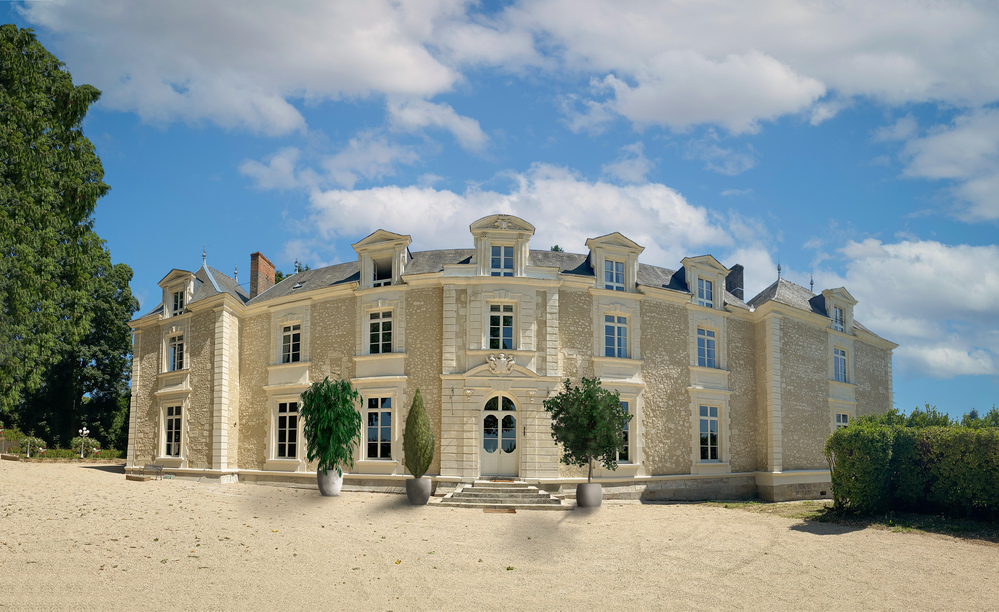
The castle's facade

=== The castle's chapel ===
The crypt is a remnant of the former chapel of Montaupin Castle, built in 1407 and dedicated to Saint Mary Magdalene. Carved directly into the rock, it offers a modest space imbued with a mysterious and sacred atmosphere.

This crypt holds particular historical significance: during World War II, it served as a refuge for a Polish Jewish family : Chinda Laja Nadanowski, née Rozensztark, and her two daughters, Berthe Ginette (born 29 January 1937, in Paris [12th arrondissement], died 2 December 2024, in Fontenay-sous-Bois) and Jacqueline (born 15 June 1940, in La Flèche, later married Chikar). Hidden here for several months to escape Nazi persecution, their survival owed much to the silent solidarity of a few villagers.

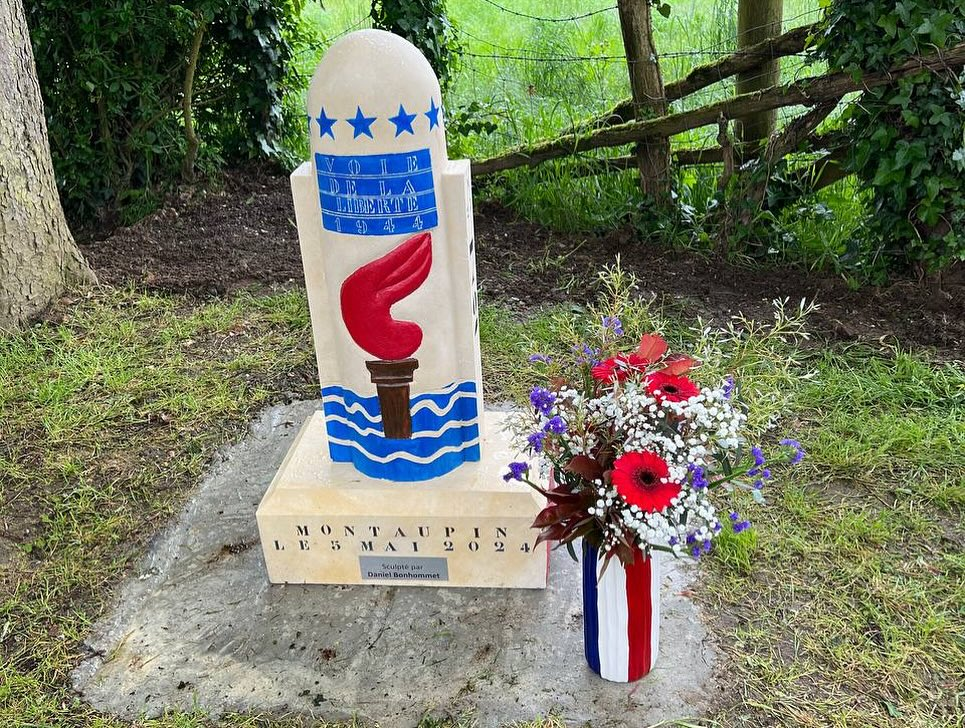
La Borne de laVoie de la Liberté sculpted by Daniel Bonhommet welcomes visitors to the castle. The Liberty Trail also passed through the Château de Montaupin.

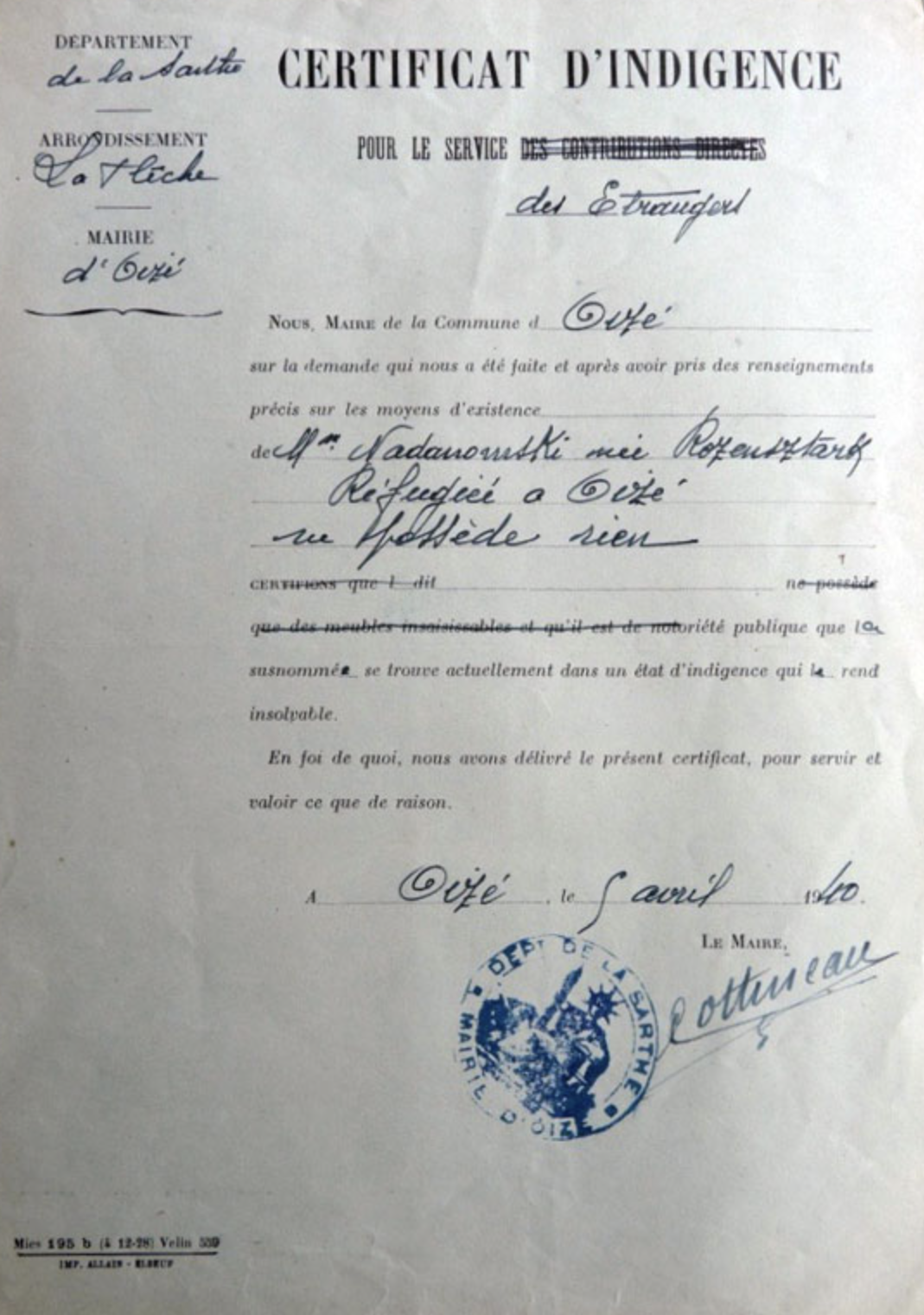
Certificate of indigence for Mrs Nadanowski

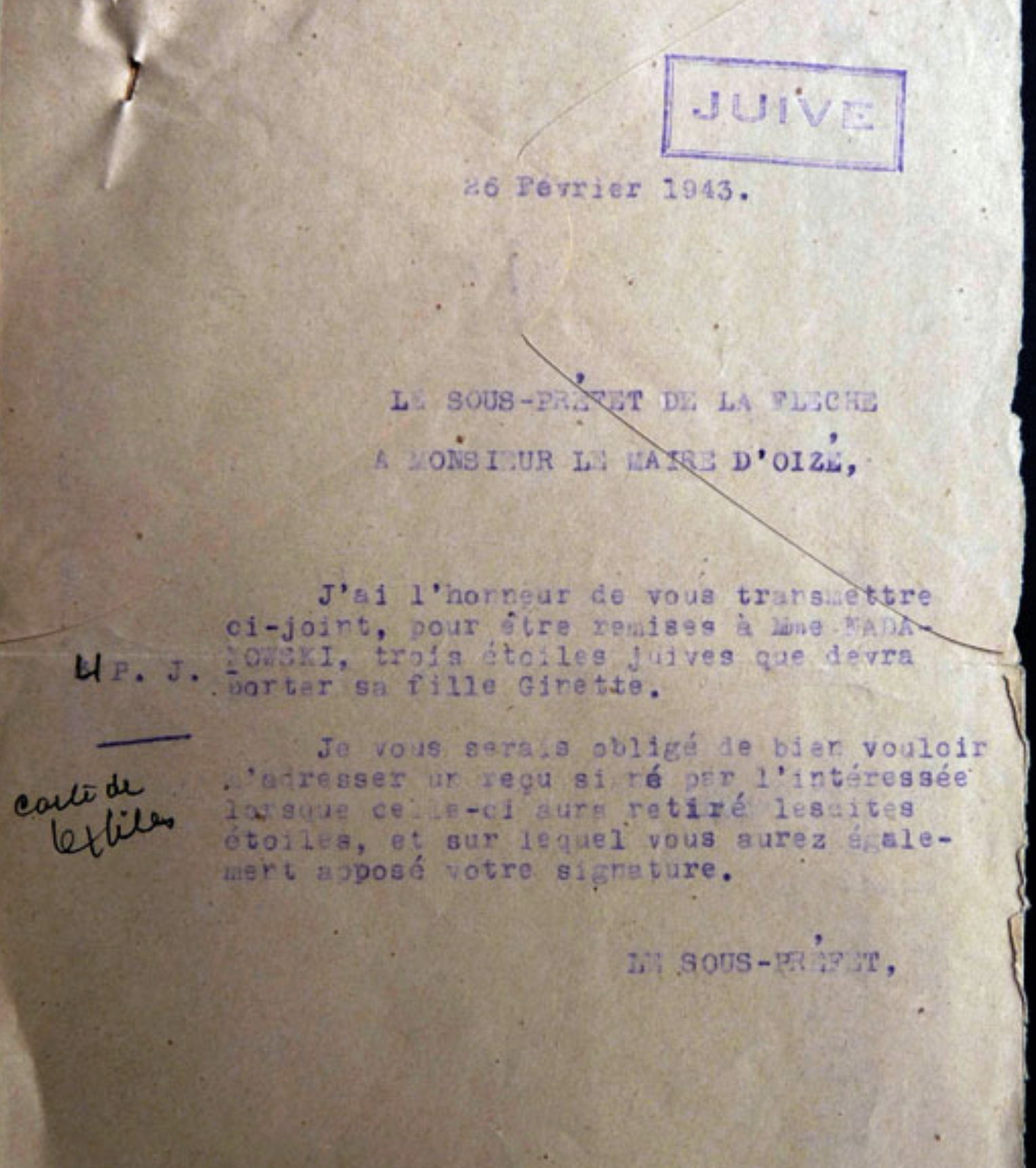
Official document dated February 26, 1943, addressed to the mayor of Oizé.

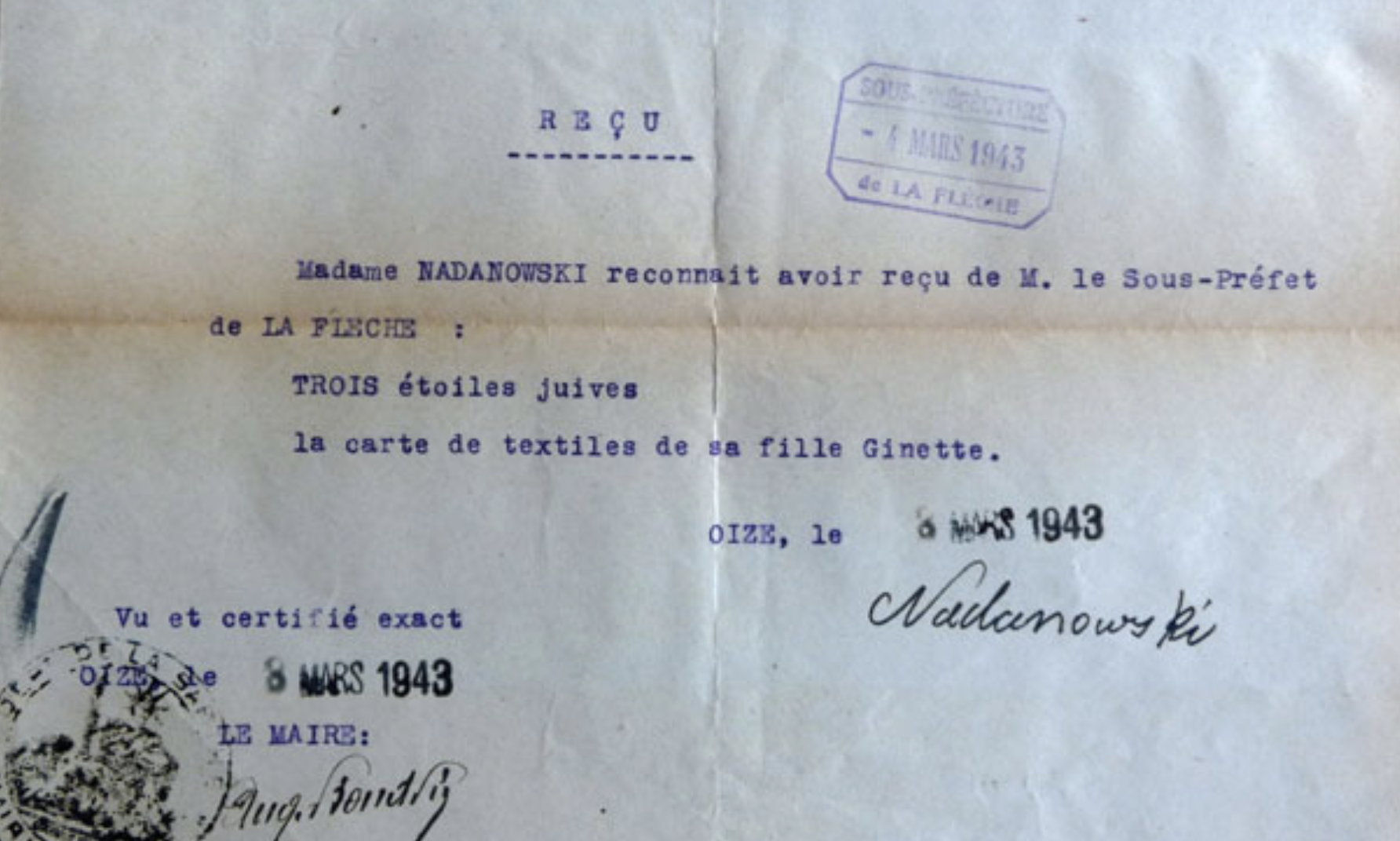
Official receipt dated March 8, 1943, signed by Mrs. Nadanowski, certifying receipt of three Jewish stars and a textile card, with administrative stamps.

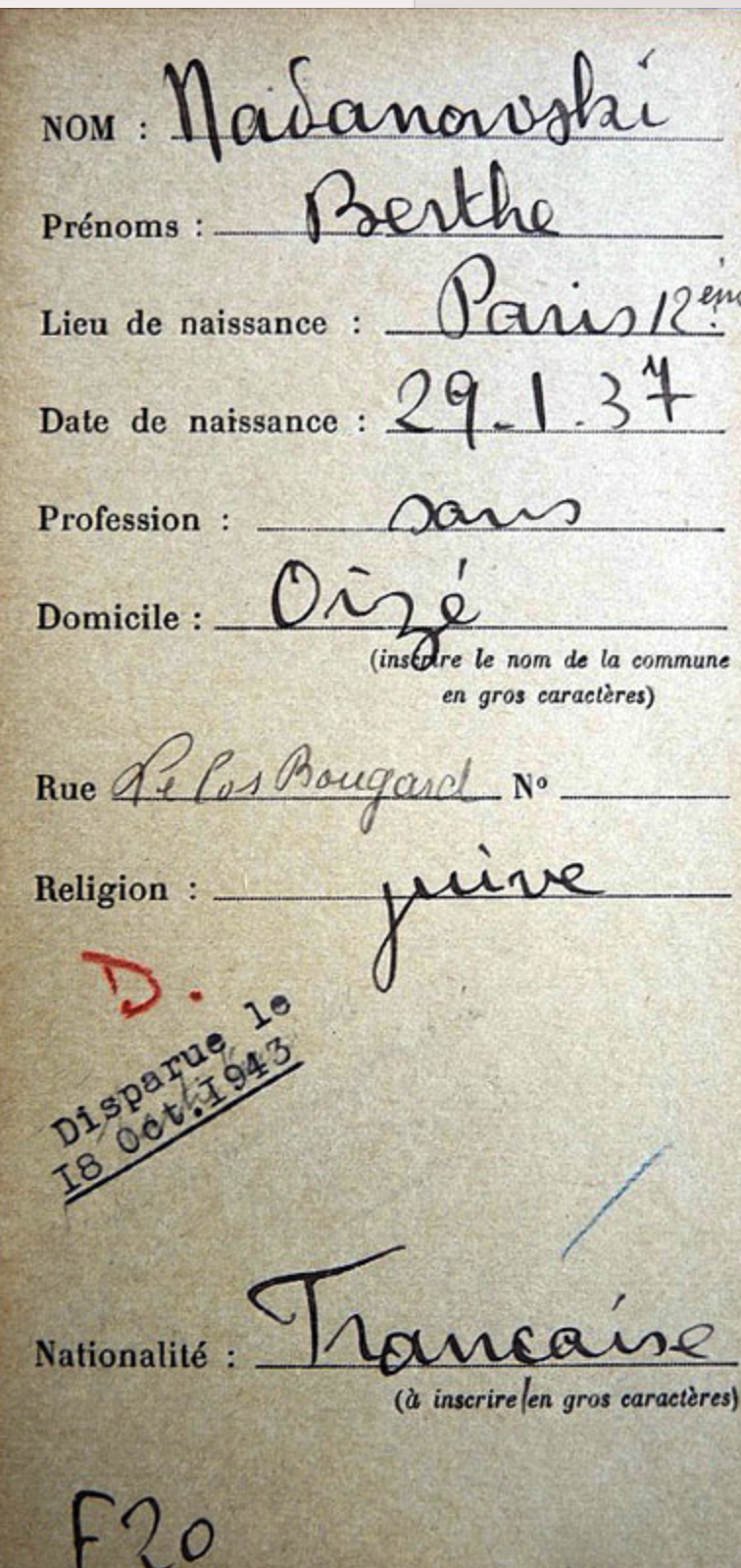
WWII-era identity card for Berthe Nadanowski.

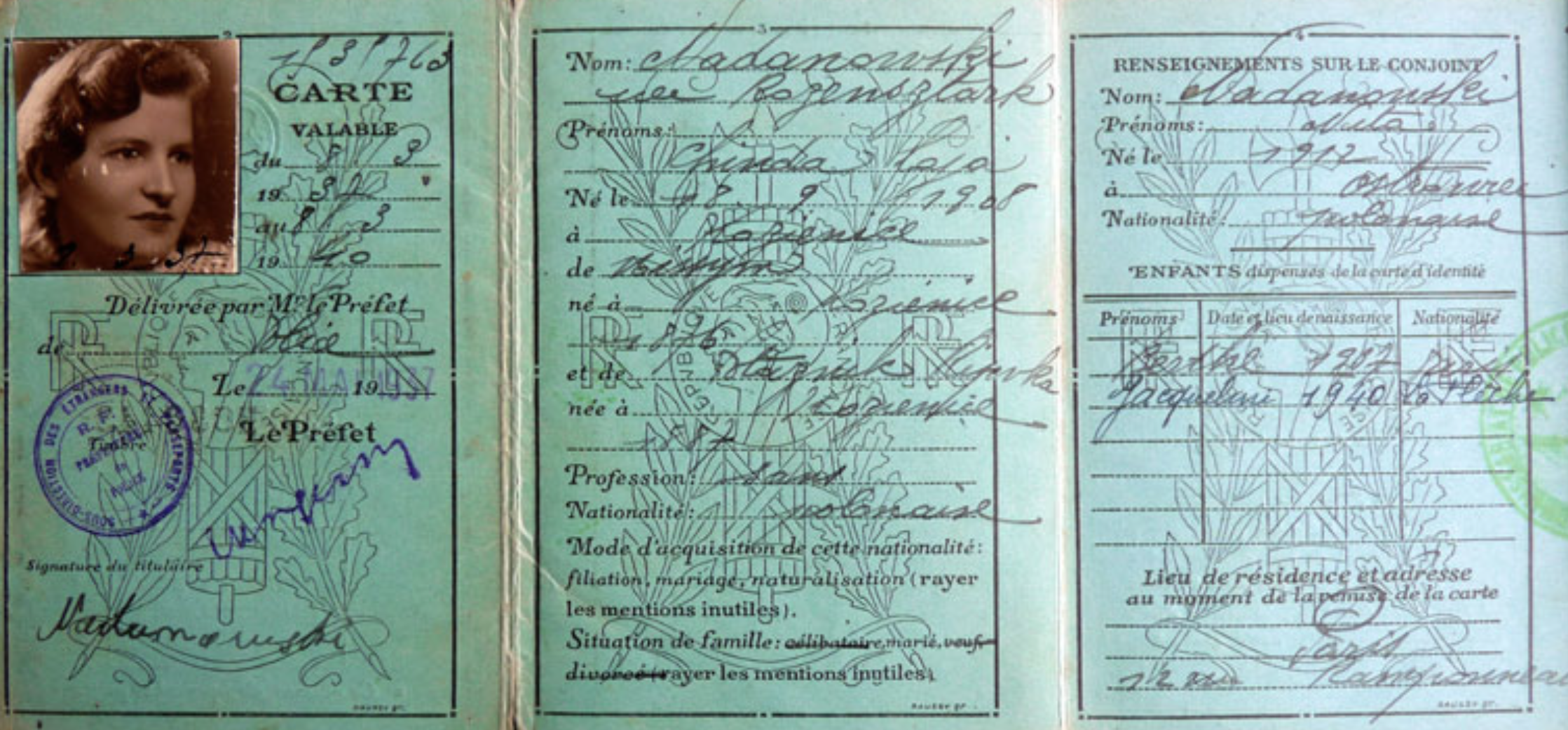
Identity cards for Chinda Nadanowski, her spouse and children.

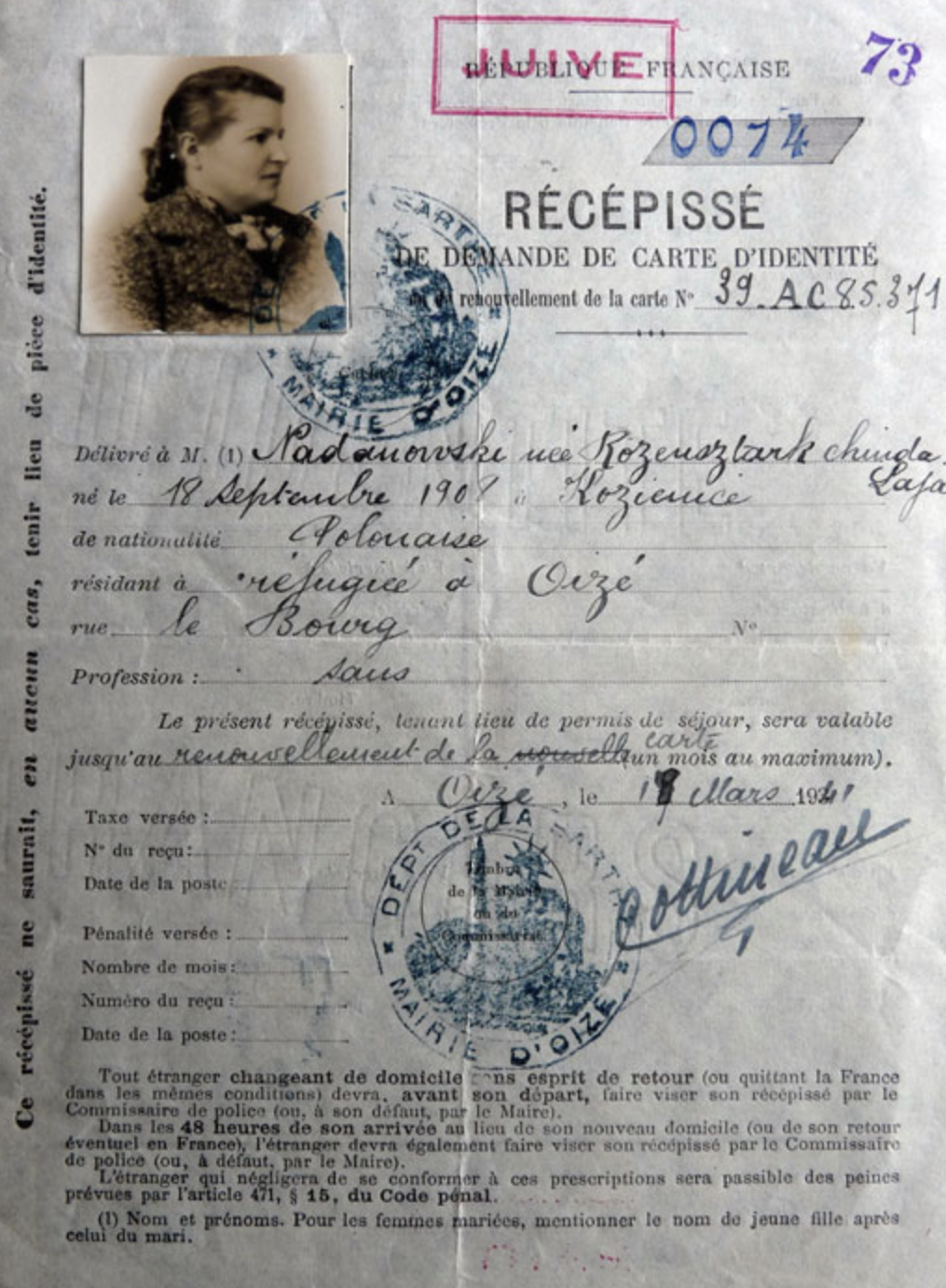
Chinda Nadanowski's identity card application

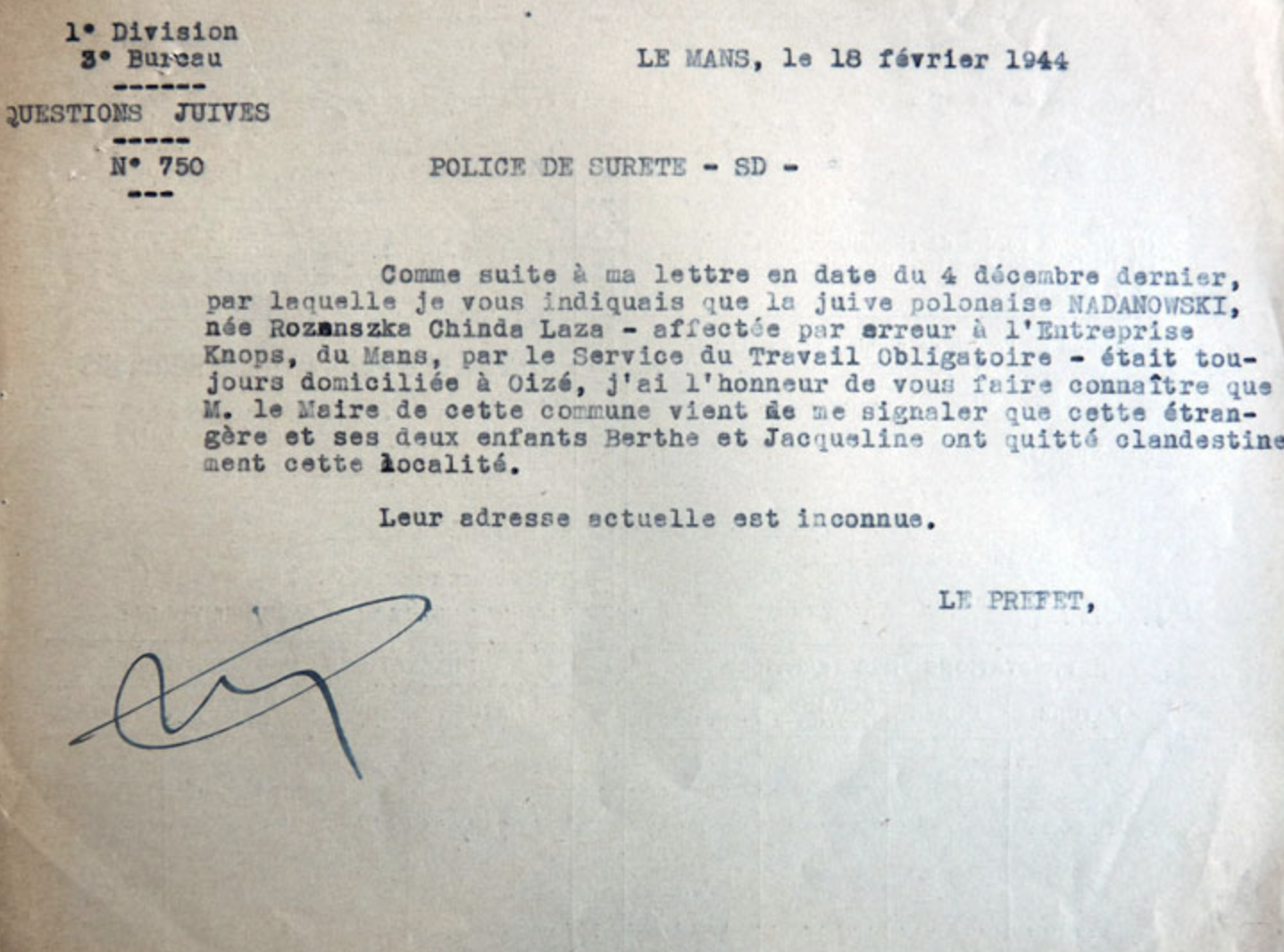
Document issued by the Sarthe Prefecture in 1944

The chapel itself had already fallen into ruins well before 1945—likely abandoned toward the end of World War II for reasons still unknown—but the crypt, which remained intact, now stands as the only tangible vestige of that era, embodying both ancient spirituality and the memory of resistance.

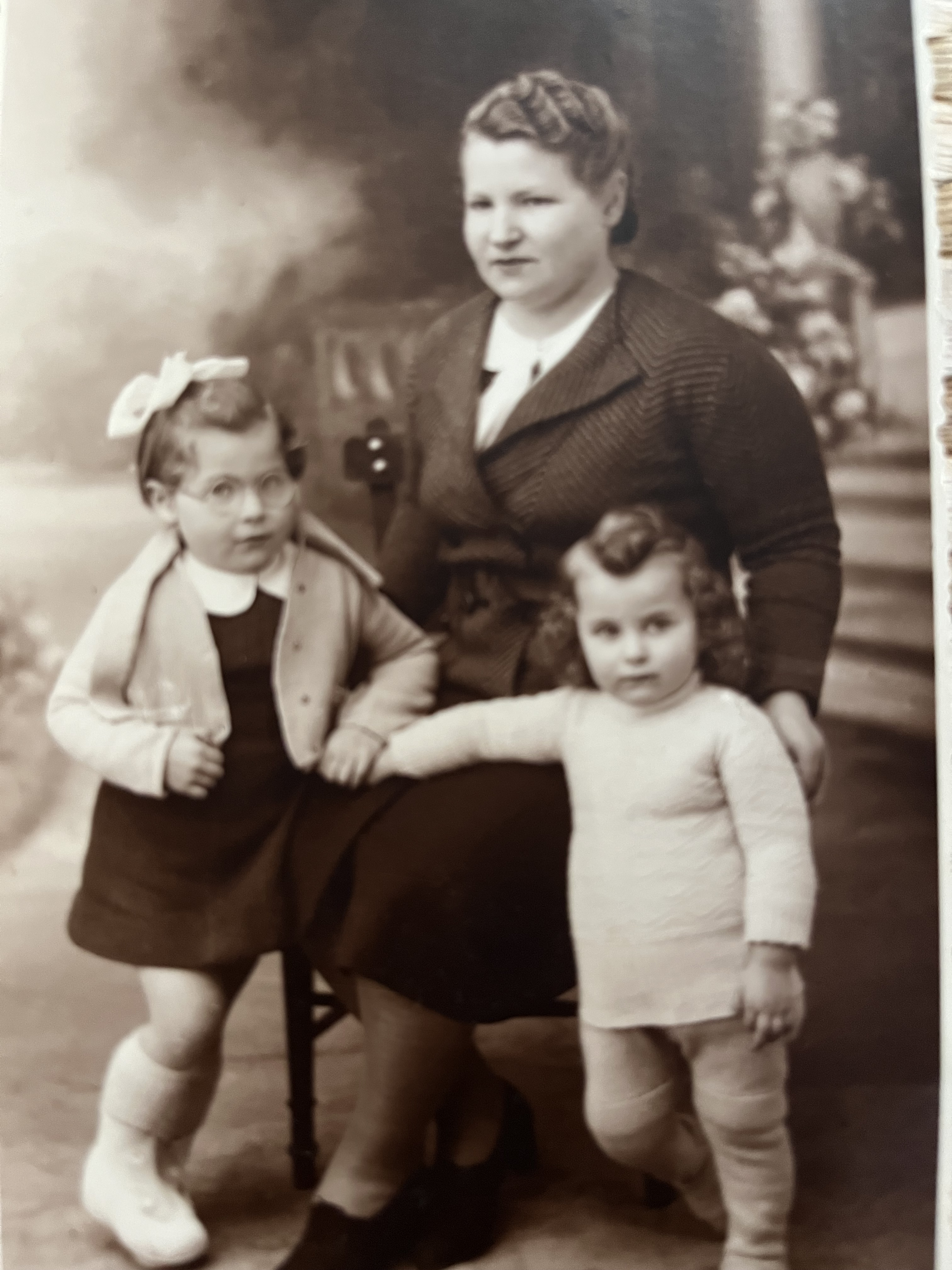
Polish Jewish family protected by the Château de Montaupin

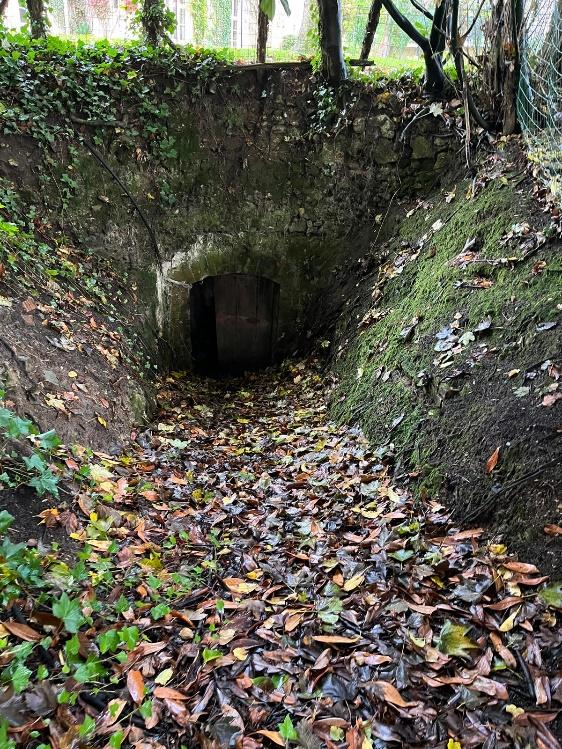
Entrance to the former castle's chapel
