= Saint-Martin de Luché Church =

Church in Luché-Pringé, France

- Église Saint-Martin de Luché
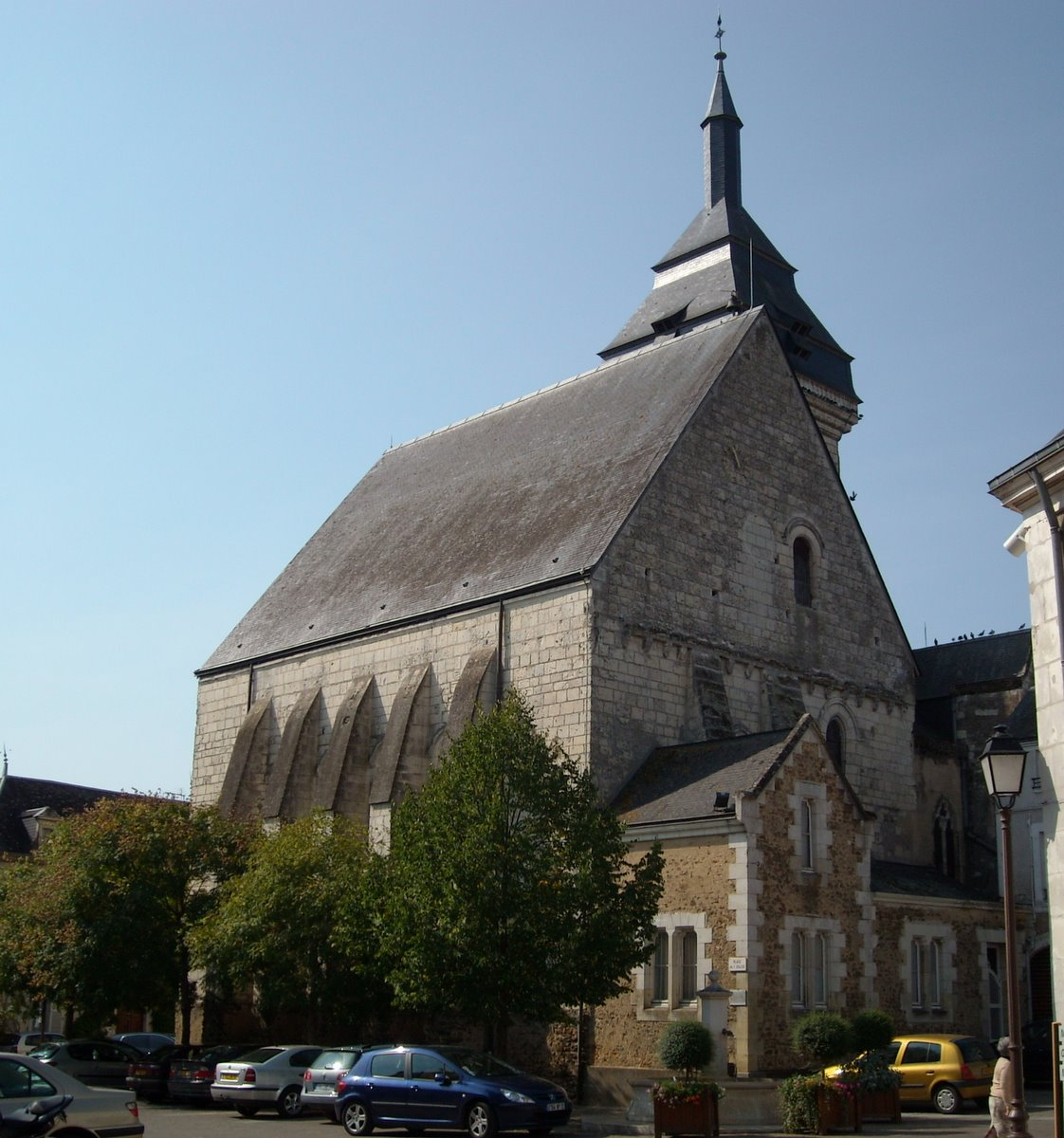
- View of the choir and bell tower of Saint-Martin church.
- Interactive map of Saint-Martin de Luché Church

General information
- Type: Parish church
- Architectural style: Plantagenet style
- Location: Place de l'Église, Luché-Pringé commune, Sarthe department, Pays de la Loire region., France
- Coordinates: 47°42′10″N 0°04′32″E
- Owner: Municipality of the Luché-Pringé commune
- Awards and prizes: Monument historique (1913)
- Designations: Adscribed to the Roman Catholic Diocese of Le Mans jurisdiction, from the Catholic Church confession

The Saint-Martin de Luché Church is a Roman Catholic parish church in Luché-Pringé, in the French department of Sarthe, Pays de la Loire region.

Built in the 11th century by the monks of the Saint-Aubin Abbey in Angers on the foundations of an ancient sanctuary probably dedicated to Saint Apollonia, the church underwent numerous transformations over the centuries. Its remarkably well-preserved choir, completed in 1225, is a fine example of the Anjou Gothic style, with its "Plantagenet" vaults. Enlarged in the 16th century by the addition of a transept, the church was partially destroyed in 1921 following a devastating fire. The nave, badly damaged, was only partly rebuilt, giving way to a forecourt that facilitates access to the building from the western façade.

Listed as a historical monument since 1913, the church in Luché boasts a rich collection of statues in wood, stone and terracotta, some of which come from the nearby church of Notre-Dame de Pringé, as well as a set of stained glass windows created by François Fialeix in the late 19th century. Most of these items have also been classified as historic monuments.

== History ==
=== From its origins to the 13th century ===
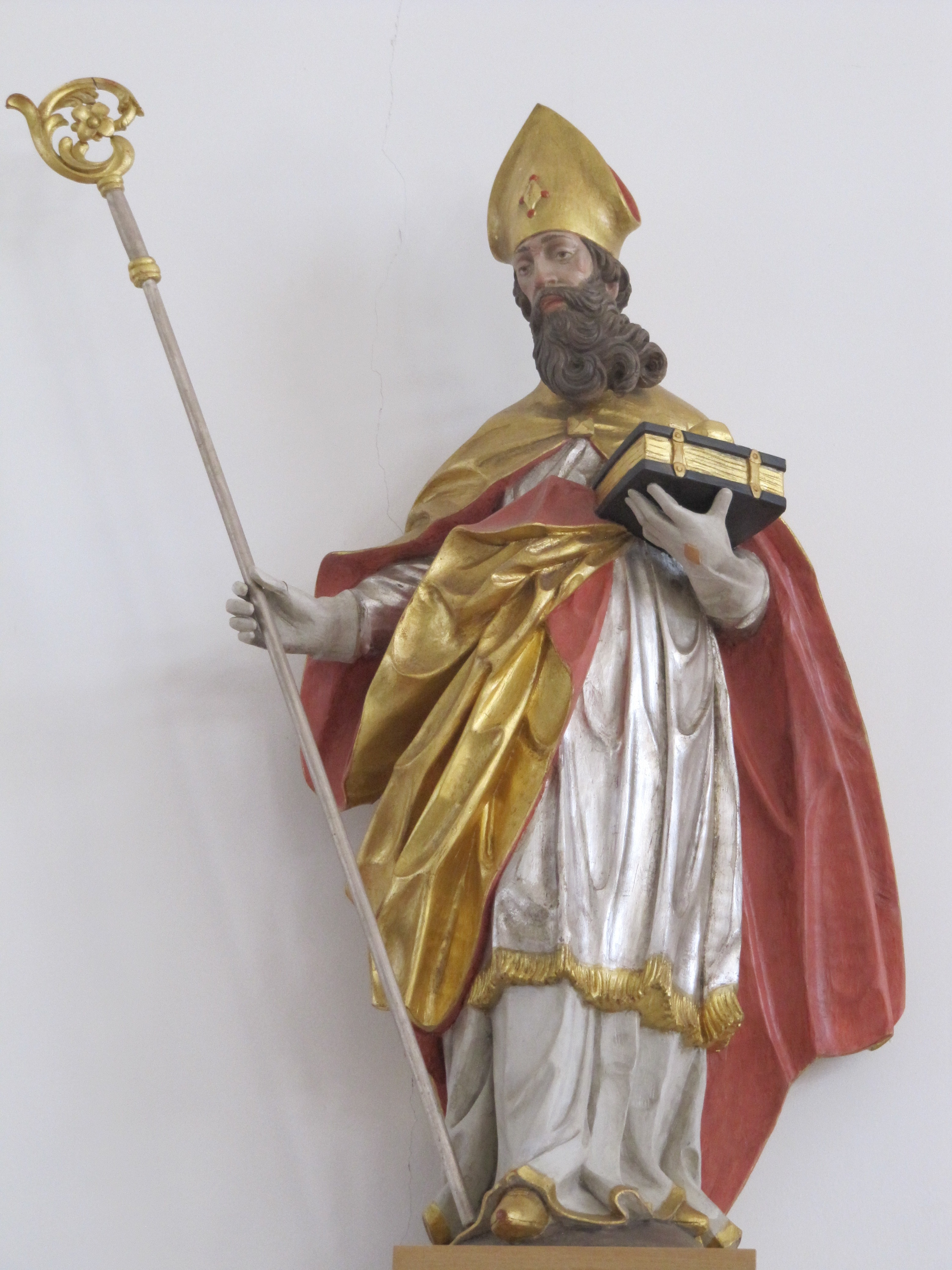
Liborius of Le Mans founded seventeen parishes, including Luché.

In the Actus pontificum Cenomannis, Luché is listed among the seventeen parishes founded by Saint Liboire, Bishop of Le Mans, in the 4th century, making it one of the oldest parishes in Maine. The location of the site is certainly linked to the presence of a ford to cross the Loir at this point. No trace remains of this first sanctuary, probably dedicated to Saint Apolline, apart from the name of the square adjoining the church to the south, and its well which is fed by a spring originating beneath the building's choir.

The Luché church is mentioned again almost seven centuries later in the cartulary of Saint-Aubin d'Angers. In 1057, Raoul V, viscount of Maine, and his wife Emmeline de Montreveau, lady of Le Lude, donated the building to the monks of Saint-Aubin for the symbolic sum of five sols, with the obligation of founding a priory there under the patronage of Saint Martin. Work began immediately on the construction of a new church. The two buildings were erected side by side, so that the church at the time had no western façade, as this entrance was reserved for the canons.

The priory soon prospered through a series of acquisitions and donations, notably from Adélaïde, sister of Seigneur Geoffroy de Sablé, and Gérard d'Athée, advisor to John Lackland, King of England. On several occasions during the 12th century, possession of the priory of Luché was confirmed to the monks of Saint-Aubin by Popes Paschal II and Eugene III, as well as by various bishops of Le Mans.

Construction of the choir and bell tower bases was completed in 1225.

=== Modern period ===
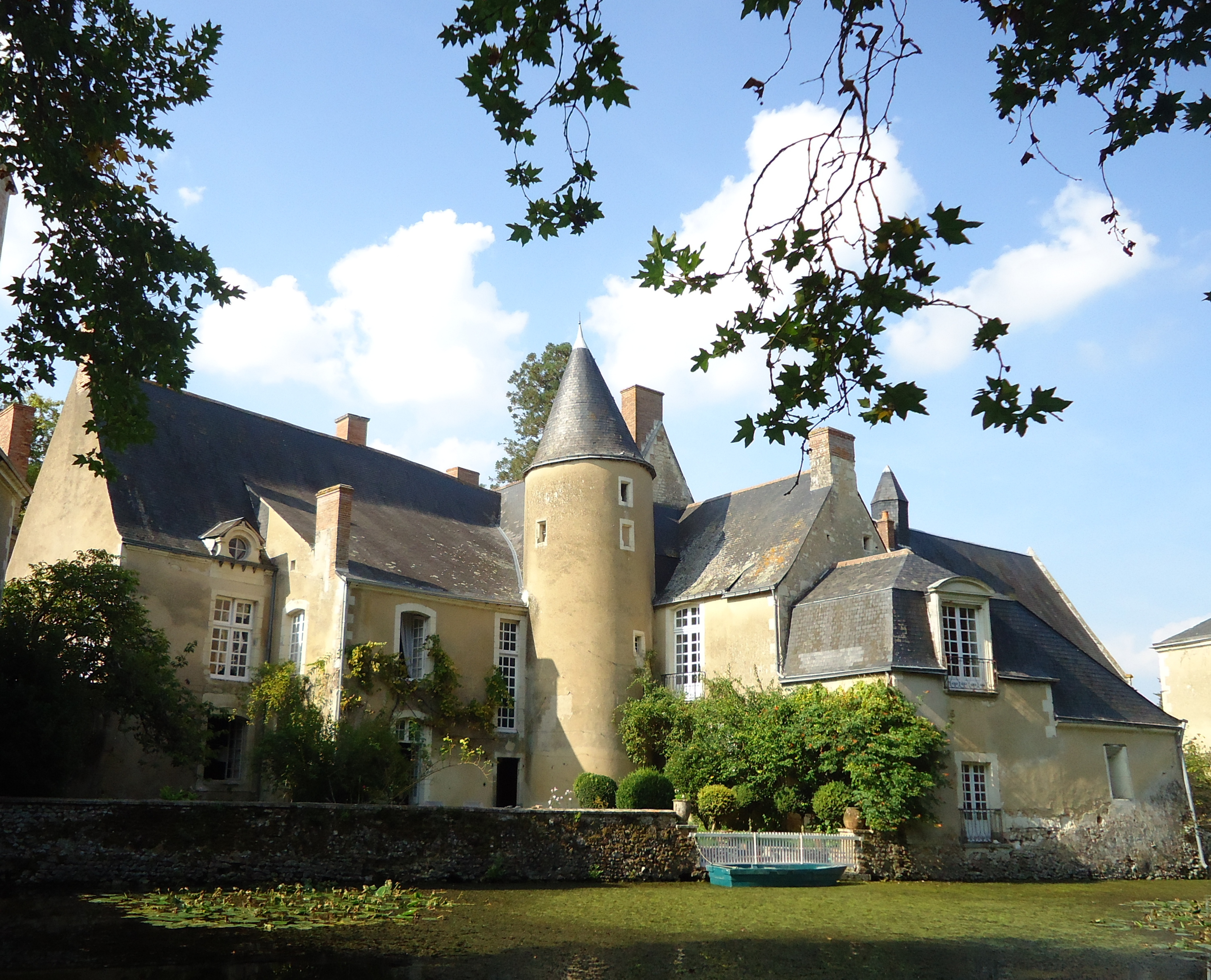
The Venevelles manor house, whose lords were among the church's benefactors in the 16th century.

Construction of a new transept began in the 14th century, but was delayed by the Hundred Years' War. The adjoining priory was demolished in 1474, before being rebuilt. The project was not completed until the dawn of the 16th century, under the impetus of generous donors including Geoffroy II de Chemens and his wife Marthe de Baïf, sister of Jean-Antoine de Baïf, poet of the Pléiade. The keystones of the transept arms were built between 1506 and 1538.

During the same 16th century, major restoration work was carried out on the nave and the upper part of the bell tower, thanks to the considerable resources of successive commendatory prior, including François Disque, King's Counselor at the Parlement of Paris, Chancellor to Queen Dowager Eleanor of Austria and Archdeacon of Laval. In 1538, the church received a new bell adorned with three fleurs-de-lis, the figures of the Virgin Mary and St. Michael, and inscribed with the names of its donors, the lords of Venevelles.

In 1557, the priory was taken over by a Protestant convert, Titus Disque, who had some of its furnishings destroyed. His two successors were supported by the lords of Venevelles, who were also Protestant. In 1604, the church and priory of Luché were included in the endowment made by King Henri IV to the Jesuits charged with establishing the Collège Henri-IV de La Flèche. The Jesuits set up a school in Luché.

=== Revolution and the 19th century ===
On August 1, 1796, the church was sold as national property to three villagers who wished to save it from destruction: Pierre-François Lépine, farmer of the métairie de la Brosse, his wife Marie-Gervaise Robineau, and René Martin, blacksmith. In 1809 and again in 1810, the owners made two promises to donate the church to the commune in order to return it to worship, subject to the concession of two pews. These promises were approved by two imperial decrees, the first signed on January 20, 1811, at the Tuileries Palace, the second on September 21, 1812, in Moscow, while the final deed was signed by a Luchois notary, Maître Frémond, on October 30, 1813.

At the end of the 19th century, work began on the church under the impetus of Abbé Détis, parish priest of Luché. In particular, the choir was restored in 1876. In the same year, stained-glass windows were installed by François Fialeix, a master glassmaker from Sarthe.

The building was listed as a historic monument on July 22, 1913.

=== Church fire in 1921 and reconstruction ===
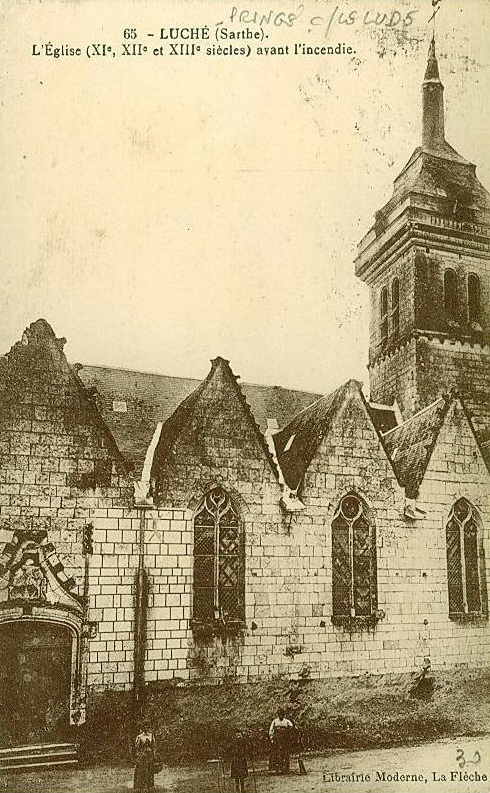
The south façade of the nave, before the fire of 1921.

At 11 p.m. on June 27, 1921, lightning struck the bell tower, which immediately burst into flames. Father Fouque, assisted by several local residents and the commune's mayor, Henri Bourdin, sheltered several statues, as well as the priestly vestments and most of the liturgical objects. The fire quickly spread to the rest of the building, starting with the nave frame. First aid was organized around the Luché firefighters, who had only a hand pump supplied by a human chain carrying buckets of water, while awaiting reinforcements from the companies of La Flèche and Le Lude, as well as a platoon from the Prytanée national militaire, during the night.

The fire, which was not contained until 5 a.m., caused extensive damage: the nave and bell tower were completely destroyed, the bells, partly melted, broke in their fall, and numerous items of furniture were damaged, as was a neighboring house. Only the choir vault was preserved. At 1 p.m. on the same day, another fire broke out in the rubble, but was quickly brought under control.

In the first few weeks after the disaster, masses were celebrated in a temporary chapel set up in the porch of the presbytery opposite the church.

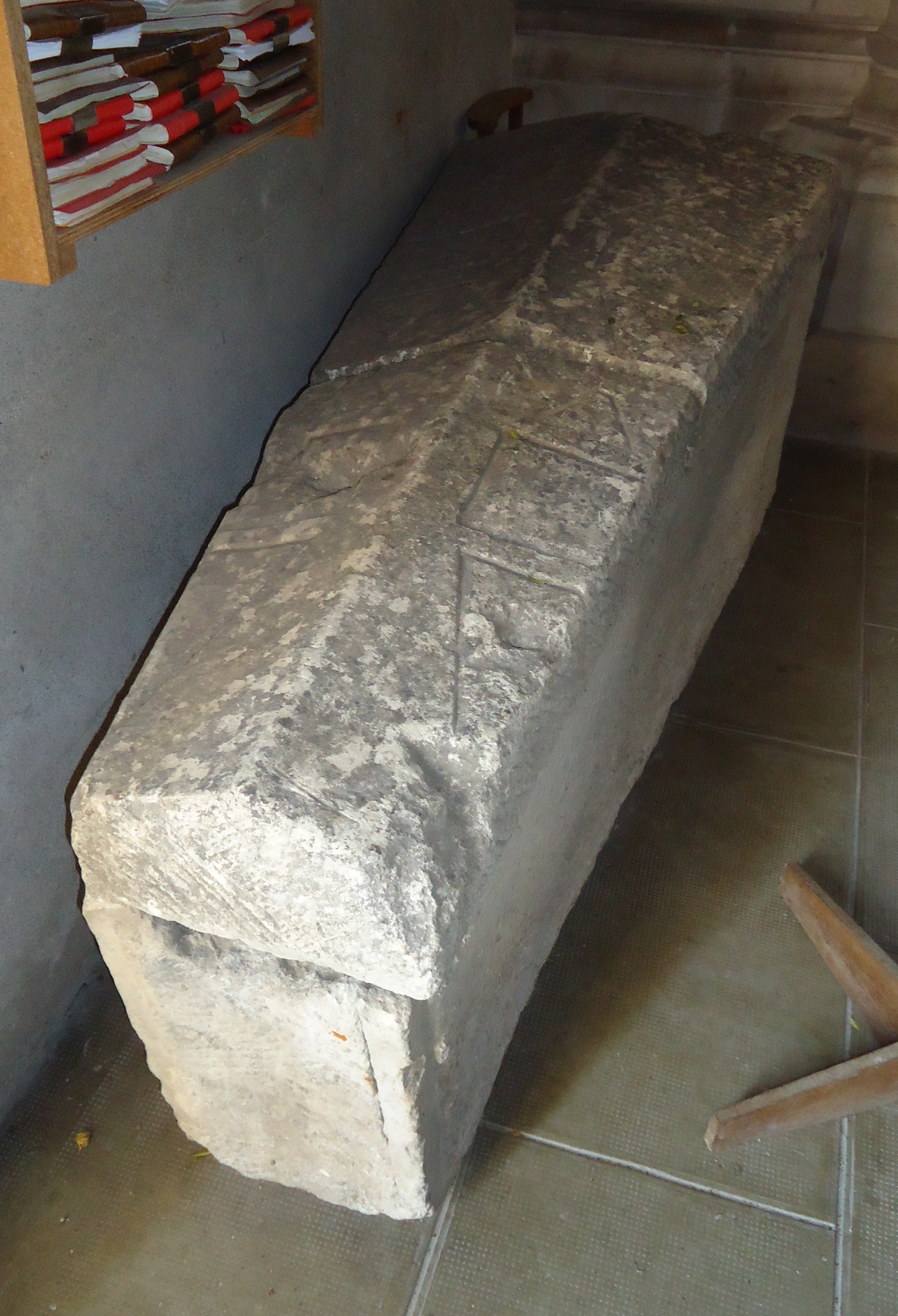
The Merovingian sarcophagus discovered during reconstruction work.

Reconstruction of the building took more than eight years, partly due to financing difficulties, and partly due to the shortage of labor and materials after World War I. Despite various subsidies and the generosity of parishioners, the commune of Luché-Pringé had to take out a loan of 44,000 francs from Crédit Foncier de France.

Firstly, the church was made watertight by the installation of tarpaulins supplied by Mutuelles du Mans. The carpentry and roofing work was then entrusted to a Luchois contractor, Constant Gouglet, and then, when he died in January 1923, to one of his workers, Constant Houdayer. In the spring of 1923, restoration work began on the bell tower, under the direction of Émile Demas, a mason from Le Mans who specialized in sculpture and stone-cutting. During the excavation of the nave, bones and an entire sarcophagus were discovered. Given the magnitude of the task, it was decided that the last bay of the nave would not be rebuilt, leaving a low-walled forecourt in its place.

On September 8, 1929, the restored church was consecrated by Monsignor Norbert Rousseau, bishop of Le Puy-en-Velay and a native of Luché.

=== From the end of World War II to the 21st century ===
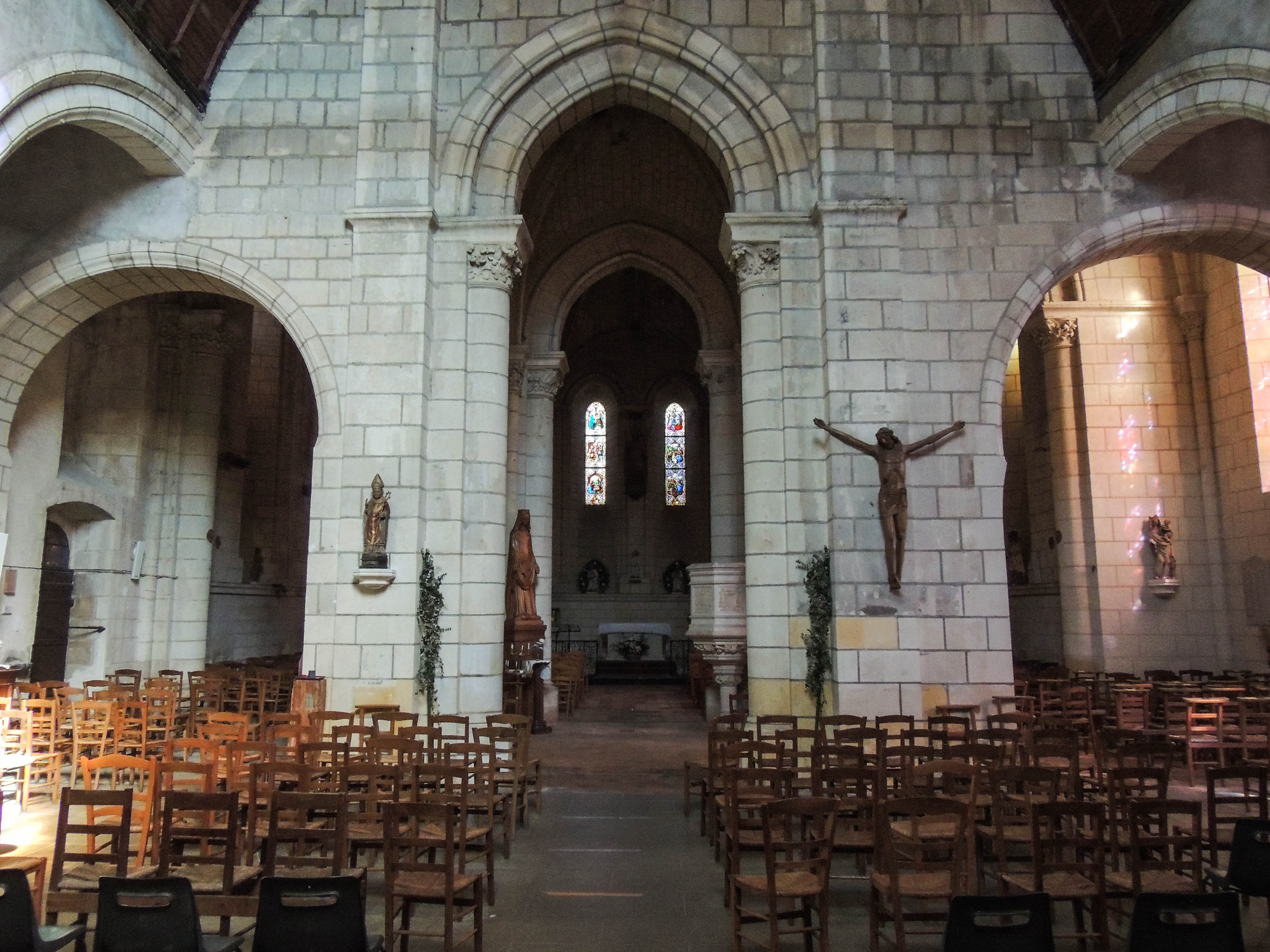
View of the church from the portal.

The church underwent further renovations after the war. Its furnishings were enrich ed by the purchase of new statues, as in 1950: a Virgin of the Annunciation carved from a cedar trunk in the park of Château de Gallerande by Sarthe sculptor Raymond Dubois, thanks to funds collected from parishioners. Similarly, in the second half of the 20th century, several statues from the nearby church of Notre-Dame de Pringé were moved to the church of Saint-Martin de Luché to protect them from theft.

In 1966, two bells from Algerian parishes were installed in the bell tower, bringing the total number of bells in the church to three. In 1996, Dom Le Méhauté, a monk from the Saint-Pierre de Solesmes abbey, built a new high altar, reusing stones from the previous one, in neo-Gothic style, donated by Abbé Détis in 1877. In 2001, the stained glass windows in the nave were replaced by abstract stained glass created by the Sarthe workshop Vitrail France.

The building is used by the parish of La Flèche-Bazouges-sur-le-Loir-Luché-Pringé-Malicorne-St-Germain-du-Val, part of the Le Mans diocese.

== Description ==
=== Architecture ===
==== The Luché church before the fire ====
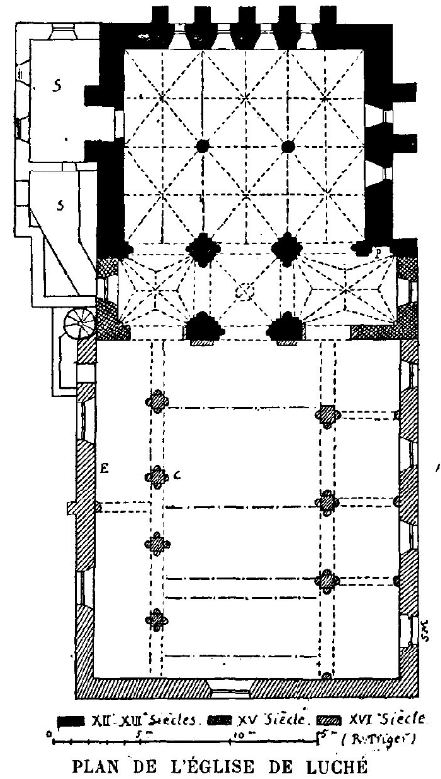
Plan of the church before 1921.

The original layout of Saint-Martin's church is atypical in that it does not follow the classic Latin cross plan: it takes the form of a large rectangle some 40 meters long and 19 meters wide. As the west façade adjoins the priory garden, the portal is cut into the south wall of the nave.

At the time, the nave consisted of three vessels bounded by two rows of square pillars, the asymmetry of which testifies to construction in several stages rather than according to a well-defined plan. The nave's north aisle is divided into two parts, corresponding to the two outer pediments, by a quarter-circle transverse arch resting on one of the nave's large arcades.

The southern aisle, of more advanced construction, is divided into four sections by transverse arches resting on the half-columns of the nave pillars and on colonnettes resting on the outer wall. Each of these four sections then corresponds to the four external pediments, bounded by double eaves.

==== The choir, testimony to Anjou's Gothic style ====
The choir and nave form two distinct sections. The dimensions of the flat choir, completed in 1225, are exceptional compared to the rest of the building: it is a rectangle approximately 11 meters long and 14 meters wide. These dimensions can be explained by the fact that this was originally the church of a priory: as the choir was then exclusively reserved for monks, it had to be able to accommodate them all. For the same reason, the high altar must have been placed under the bell tower, in the center of the building, rather than leaning against the chevet.

The choir of Saint-Martin features six curved Plantagenet-style vaults, typical of the Angevin Gothic style, resting in the center on two slender columns of hard Chauvigny stone. The keystones are adorned with rosettes, the Virgin and Child, a Paschal lamb and various coats of arms, while the liernes are masked along the walls by a series of grimacing masks. The appearance of the choir at Saint-Martin de Luché is similar to that of the abbeys of Asnières and Saint-Serge in Angers.

On the outside, it is supported by a series of flat buttresses, five of which hold up the chevet wall and frame four pointed-arched lancets. One of the buttresses features an engraved stone that has deteriorated considerably over time. An epitaph that once adorned the tomb of Abbé Mathurin Dubé, curé of Luché from 1723 to 1767.

The flat chevet choir.

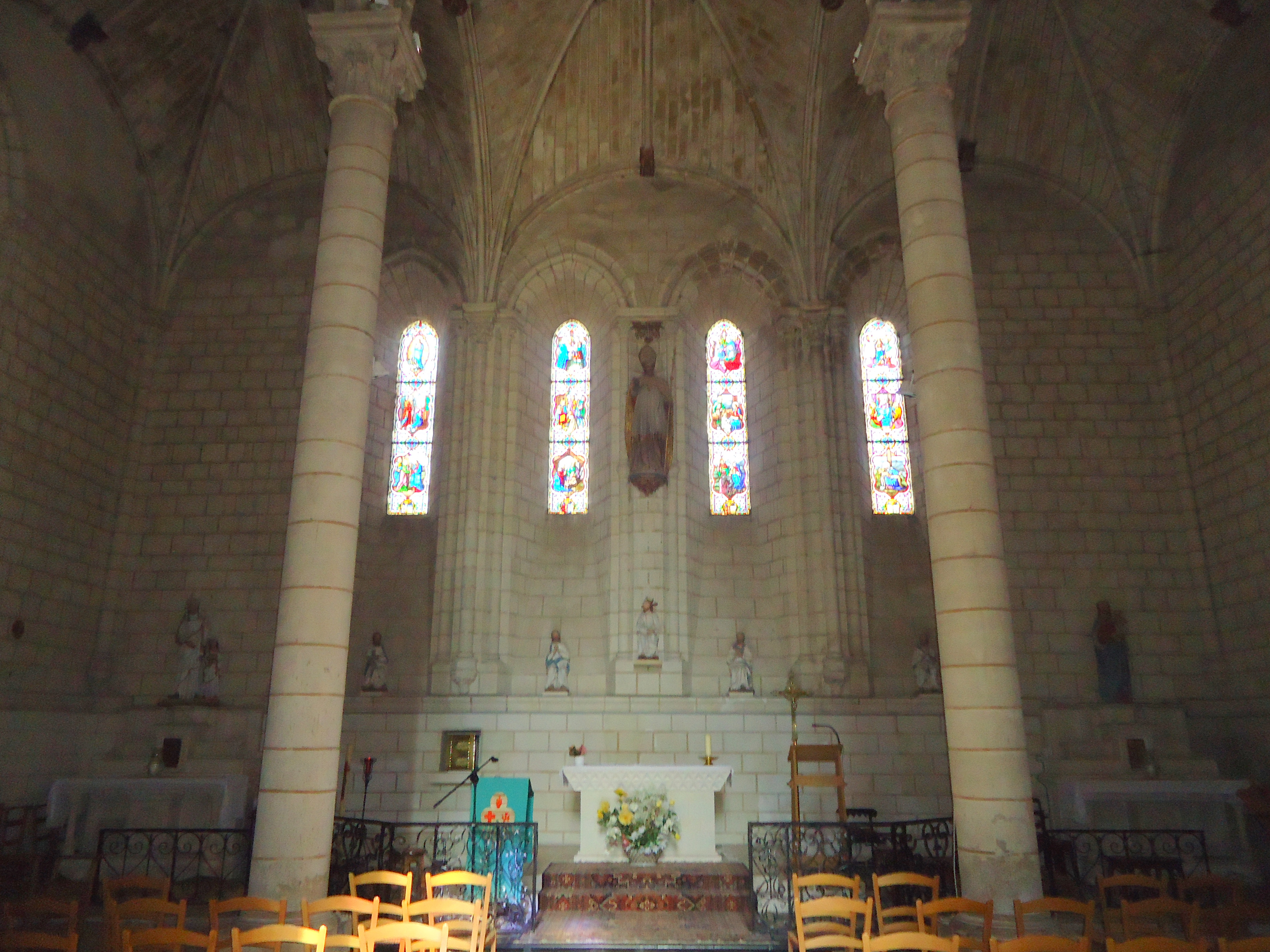
Overview.

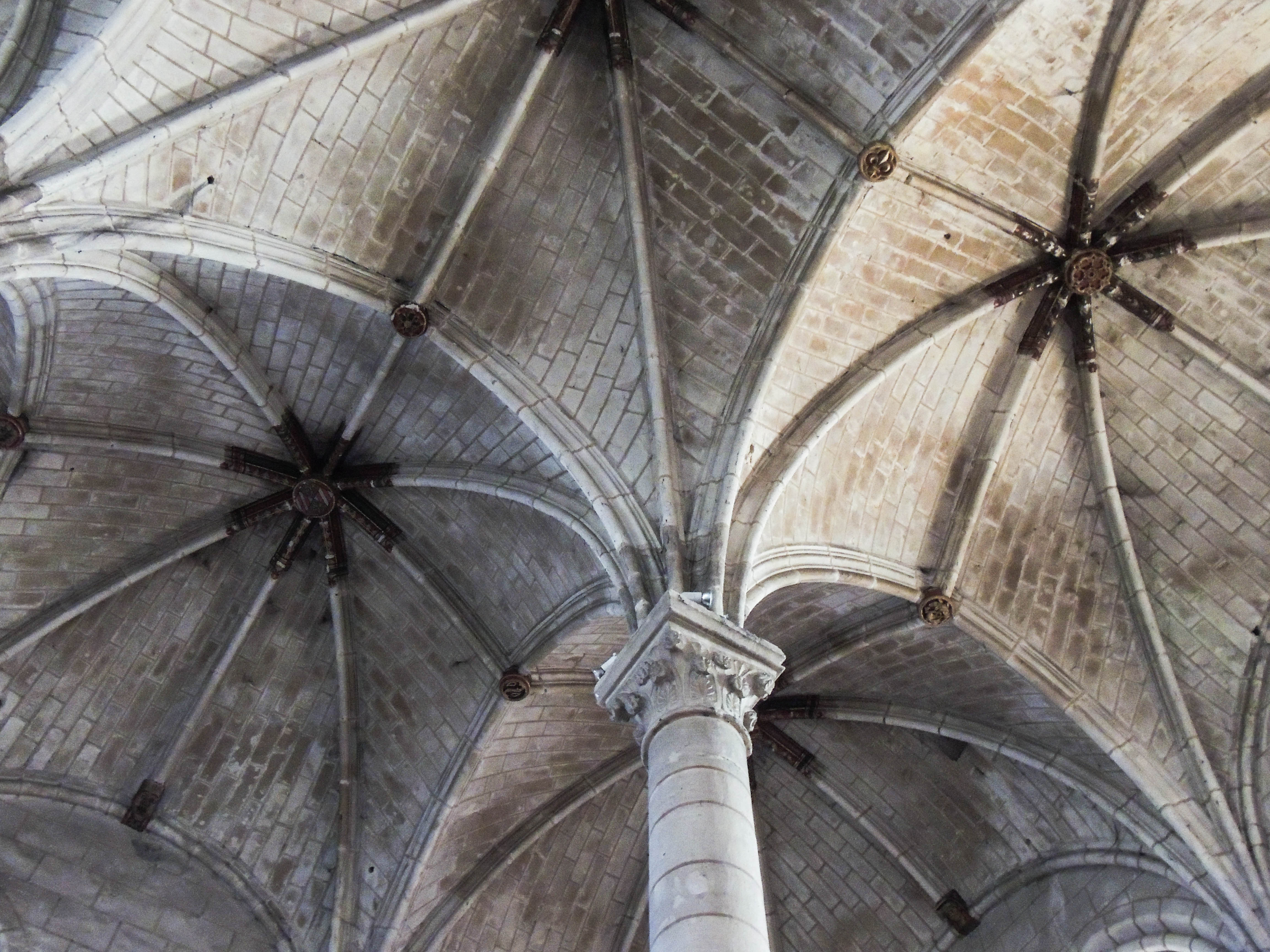
Detail of the vaulted ceiling.

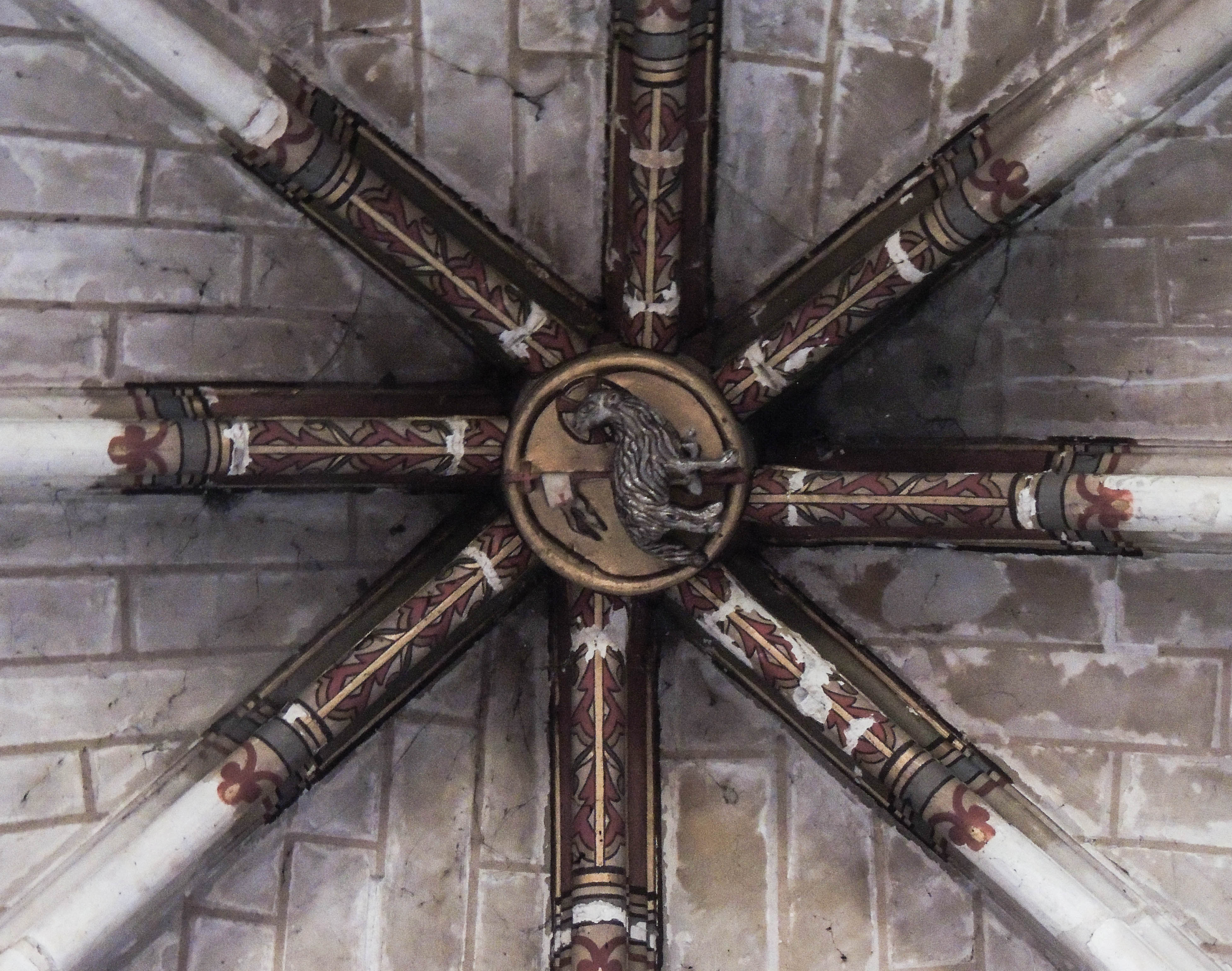
Easter lamb keystone

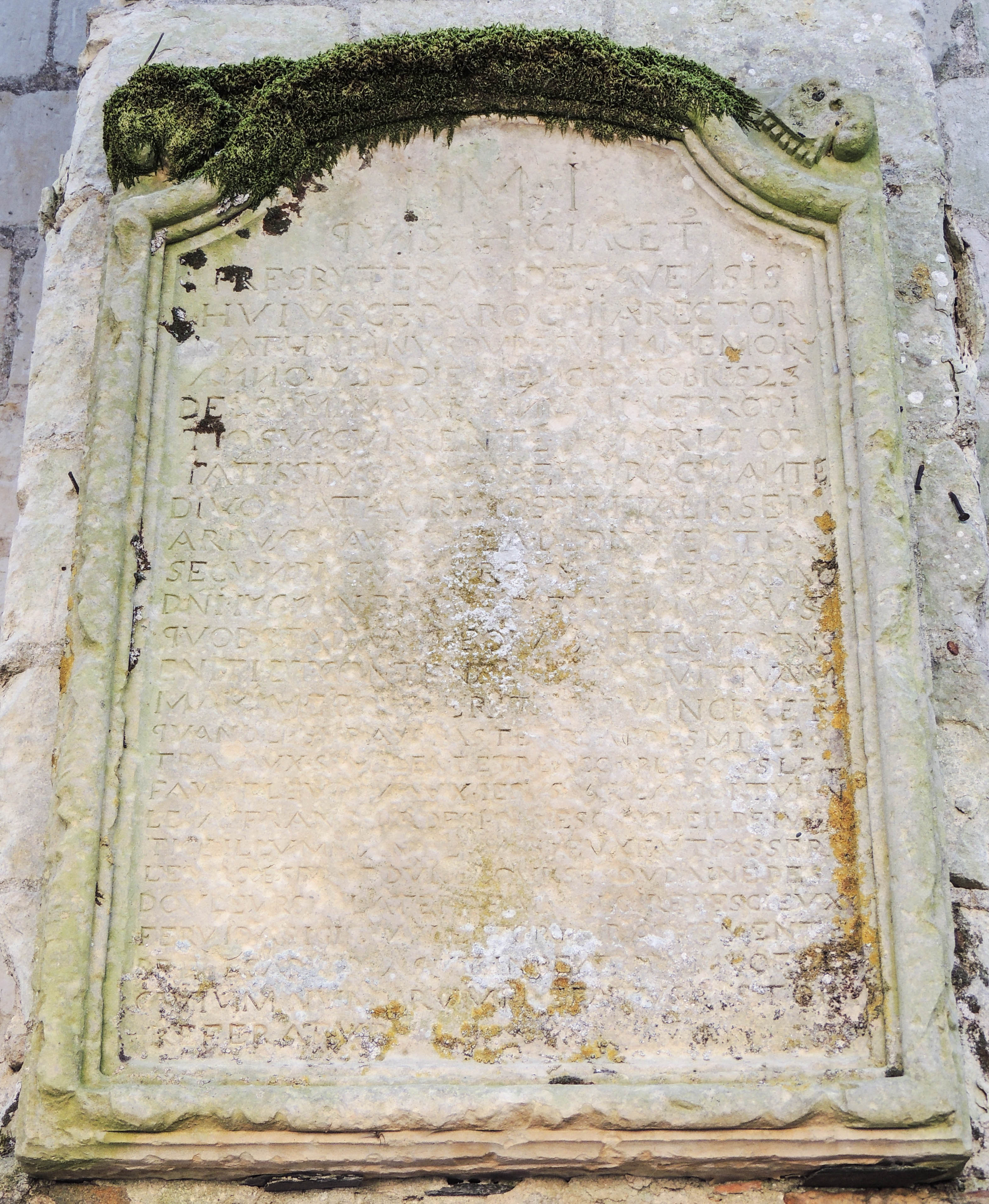
Epitaph on one of the chevet buttresses.

==== Transept and bell tower ====
The transept was built between the 14th and 16th centuries. It was completed thanks to the financial support of Geoffroy II de Chemens and his wife Marthe de Baïf, whose coat of arms adorns the keystone of the left arm of the transept.

The bell tower above was rebuilt in tufa stone in the 16th century, on 11th- and 13th-century foundations. Its square shape sets it apart from other religious buildings in the region. A long molded cornice forms the transition between the stone wall and the corbelled slate roof. It is decorated on three levels: the lower part features a series of oves and darts, in the middle are acanthus leaves and on the upper part a false balustrade.

Bell tower of Saint-Martin church.

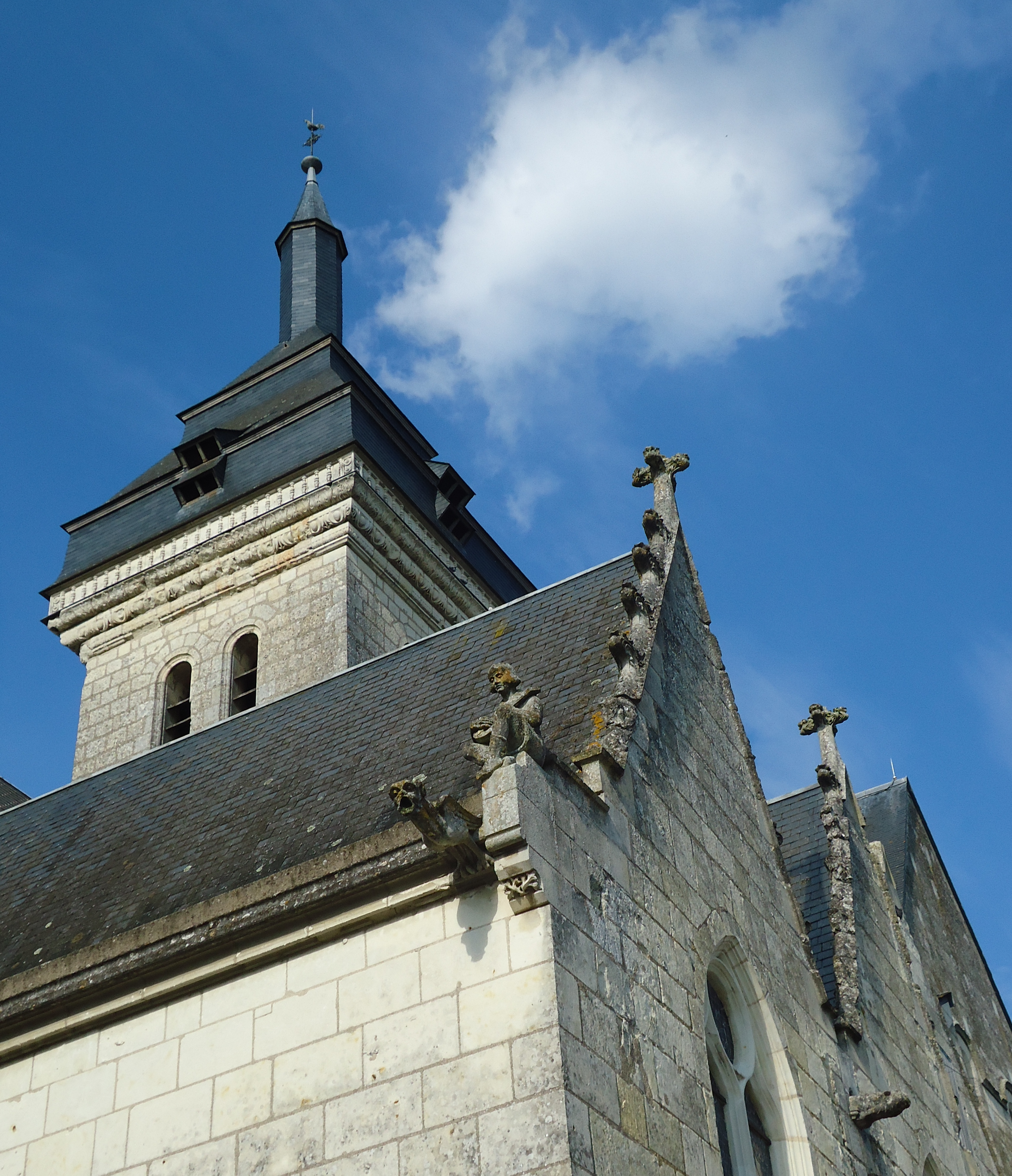
Overview.

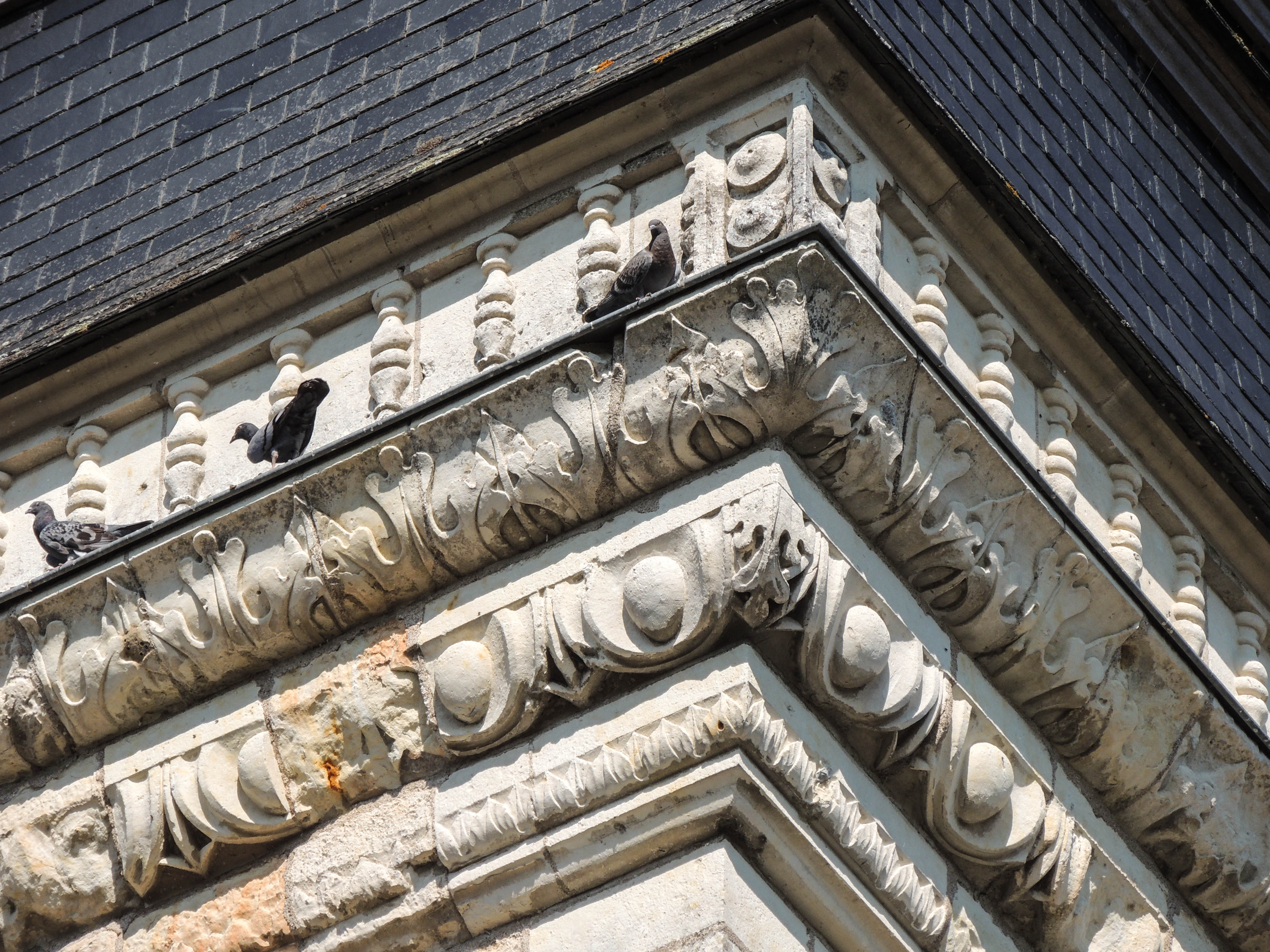
Detail of the decor.

==== Nave and entrance ====
The nave, rebuilt in the mid-16th century, consisted of four irregular bays. Almost entirely destroyed, it was only partially rebuilt after the fire of 1921, for lack of funds. The first two bays were replaced by a forecourt enclosed by a low wall allowing access from the western façade. The nave of Saint-Martin's church comprises three vessels separated by two rows of square pillars supporting pointed arches. The roof structure is paneled.

The portal, originally located on the southern façade and spared by the disaster, has been reassembled stone by stone on the new façade. The portal represents the transition between Gothic and Renaissance styles and depicts the episode of La Charité de saint Martin. The three elements of which it is composed - Saint Martin, his horse and the beggar - are partially deteriorated. Outside, the walls and corners of the nave are adorned with gargoyles and jesters.

The church entrance.

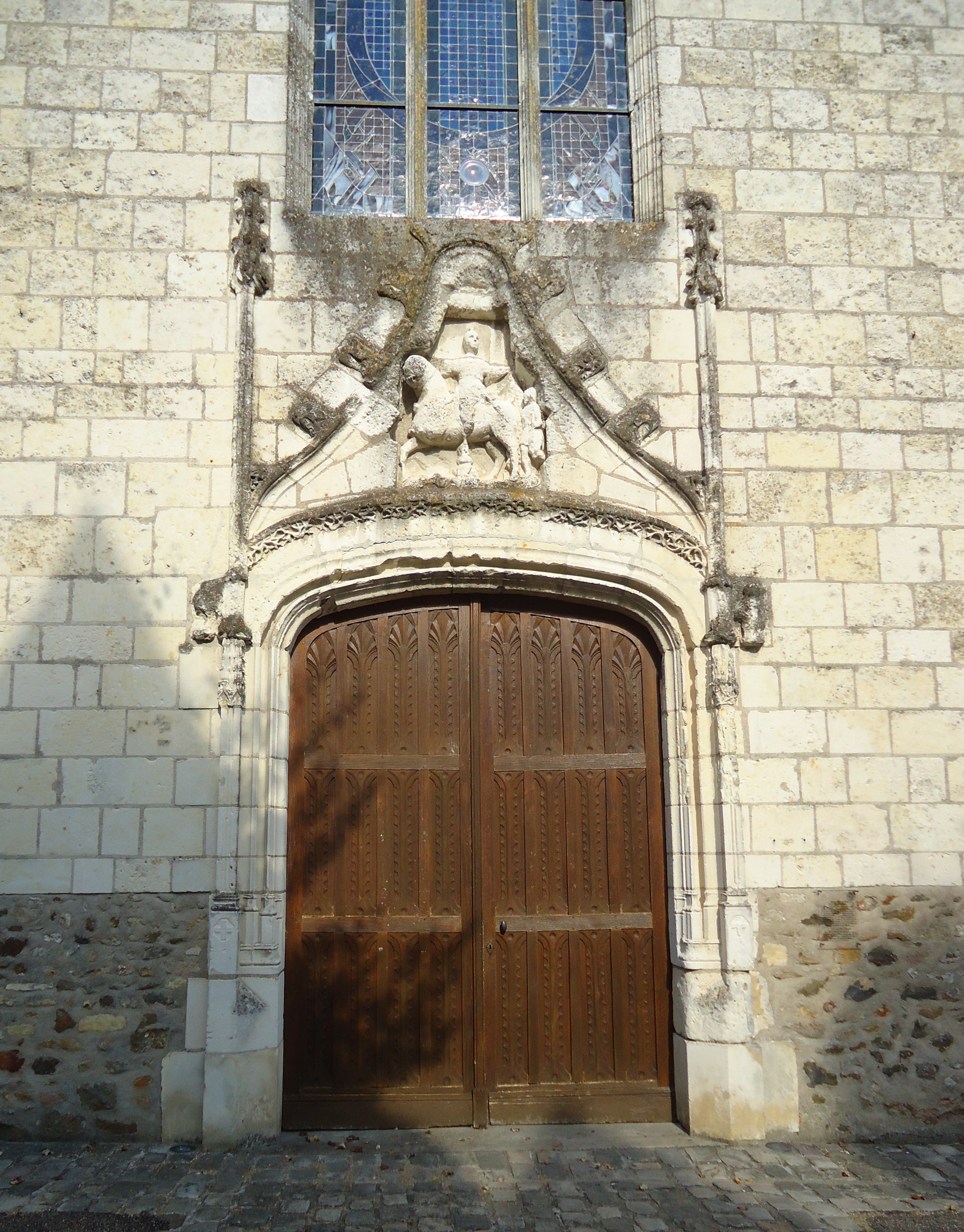
Overview

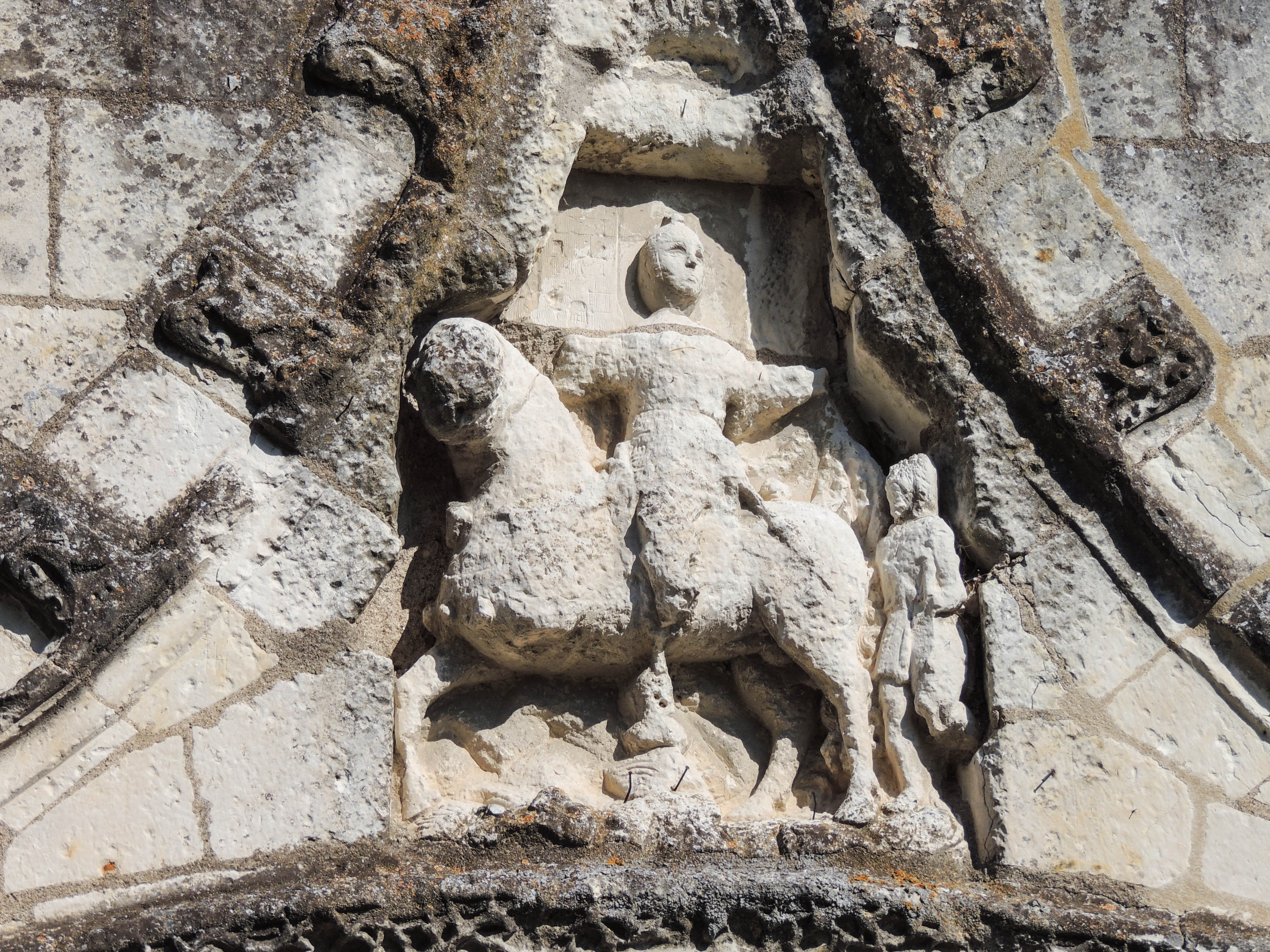
La Charité de saint Martin.

=== Decor and furnishings ===
==== Statues ====
The church of Saint-Martin is home to an important collection of sculptures in wood, stone and terracotta, some of which are listed as historical monuments.

==== Wooden statues ====
Lamentation of Christ.

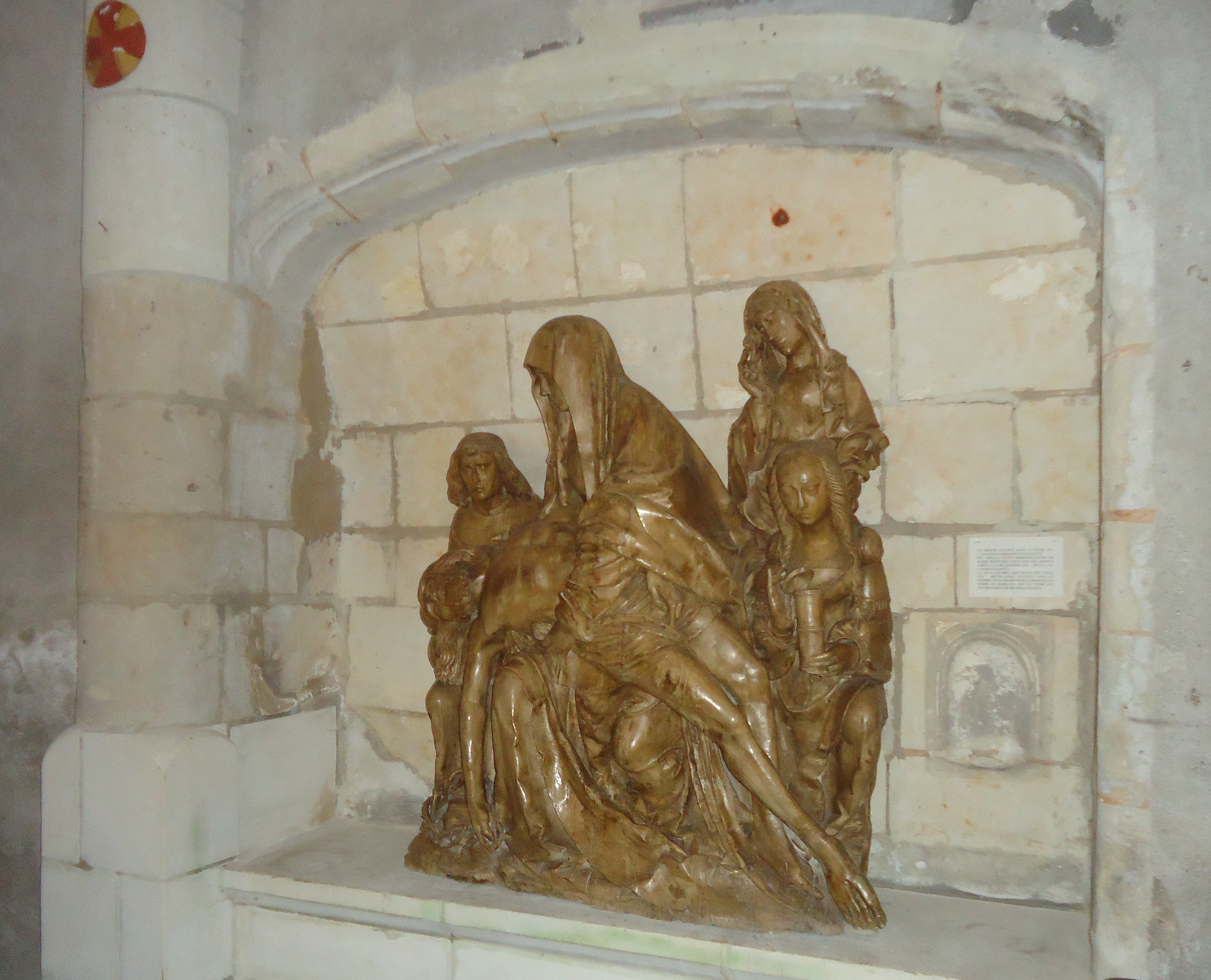
Overview

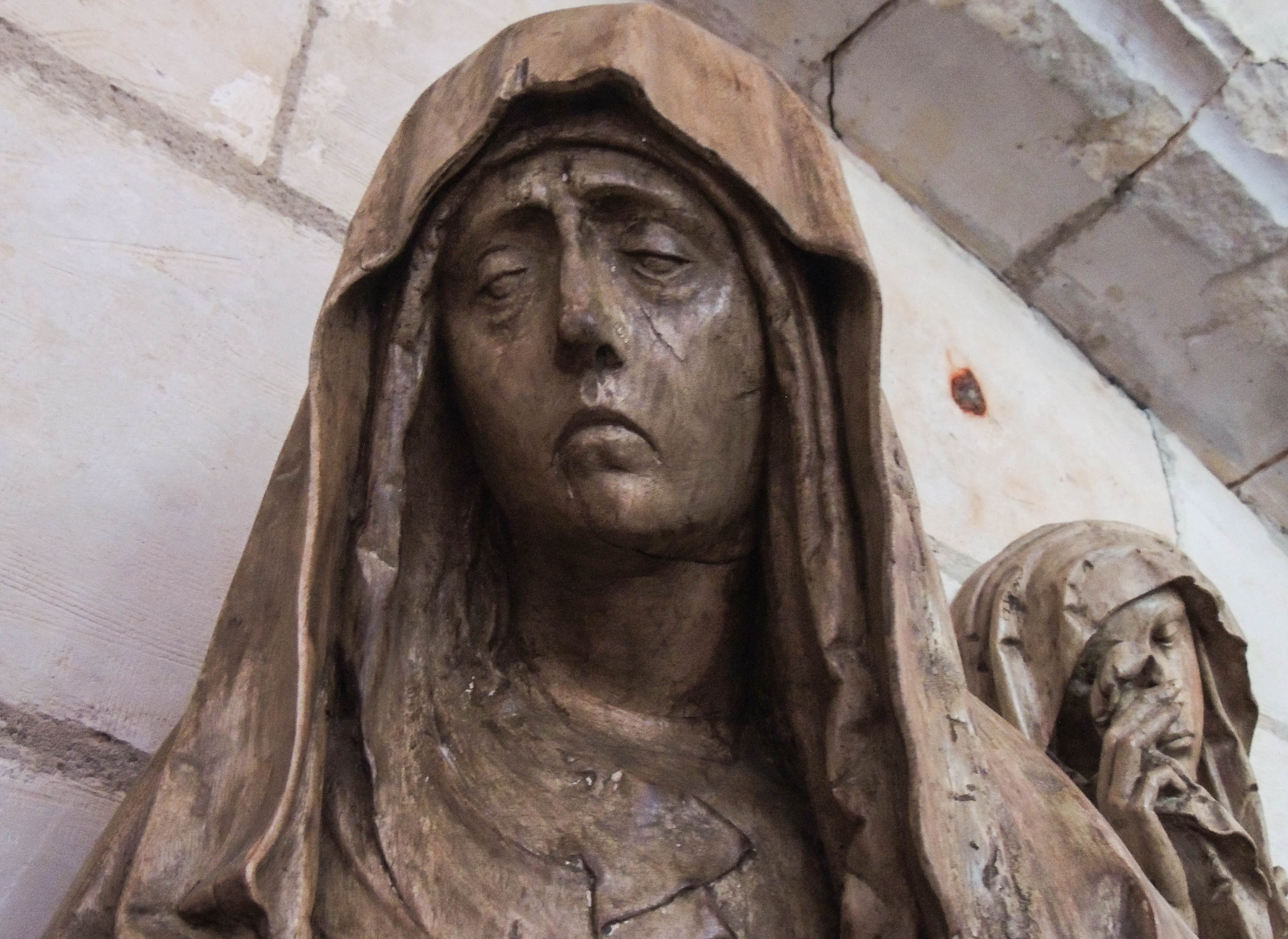
Face of the Madonna (detail).

A carved walnut wooden group statue depicting the Lamentation of Christ, sometimes called the Pietà, is located in a niche on the southern wall of the nave, at the entrance to the church. It was probably executed either by a Touraine artist in the 1500s, or by a Nordic or Burgundian artist. It is distinctive for its balanced composition and realistic expression of suffering. In the center of the group, the Virgin carries the dead Christ on her lap. She is flanked on the left by Saint John the Evangelist, and on the right by Mary Magdalene, while a holy woman stands at the back. The work also bears witness to an era of transition: the Gothic style is still clearly visible in the elongated faces, as are the curved mouths and drooping eyelids of the figures, but Mary Magdalene's costume is closer to that of the Renaissance. The layer of varnish applied to the sculpture during restoration in the late 19th century probably saved it from the fire in the summer of 1921. It was classified as a historical monument in 1938.

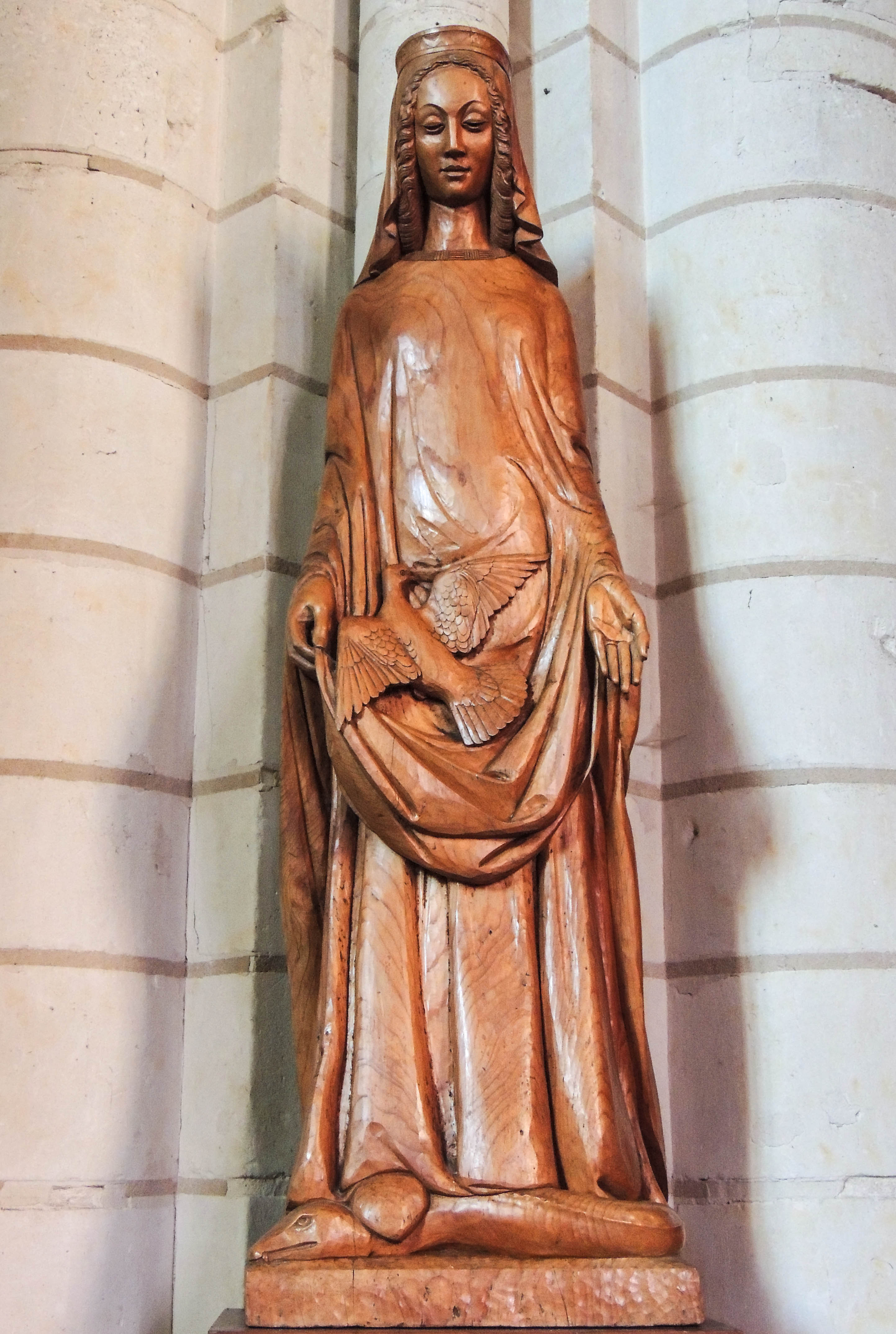
Virgin of the Annunciation.

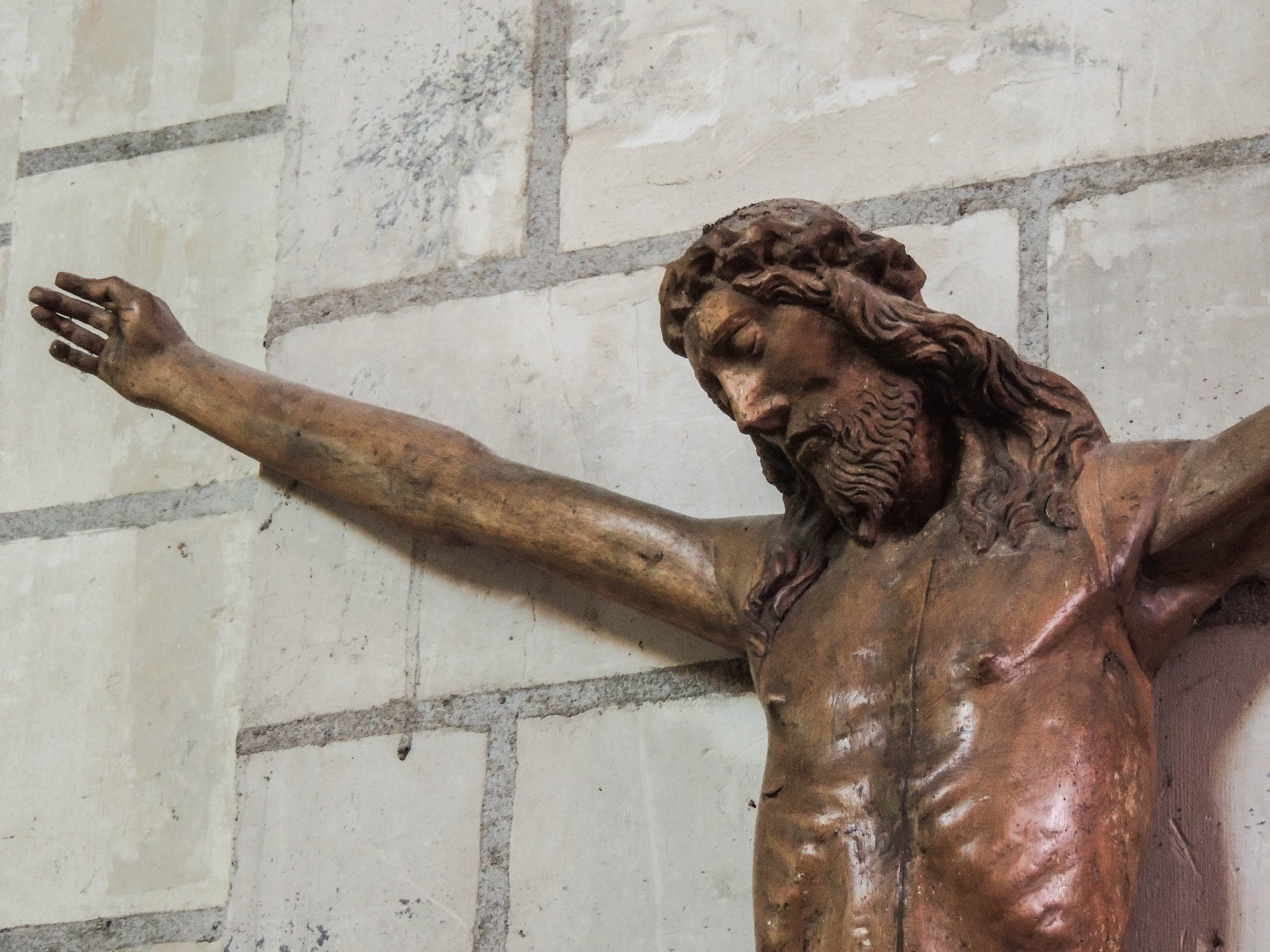
Crucifixion (detail).

The church also features two walnut wooden statues depicting the Crucifixion. Dating from the 15th or 16th century, it comes from the church of Notre-Dame de Pringé and was damaged by fire in 1921, with the loss of the cross and part of Christ's body. Its arms were sculpted and added around 1990 by Abbé Georges Guillaume, parish priest of Luché-Pringé.

The second is to the left of the entrance, above the baptismal font. Also damaged in the fire, it was restored by Touraine sculptor Christian Sallé in 2003.

More recent works include the Virgin of the Annunciation, installed under the bell tower vault and carved from a cedar trunk from the park of Château de Gallerande, by Sarthe sculptor Raymond Dubois in 1950.

==== Stone statues ====
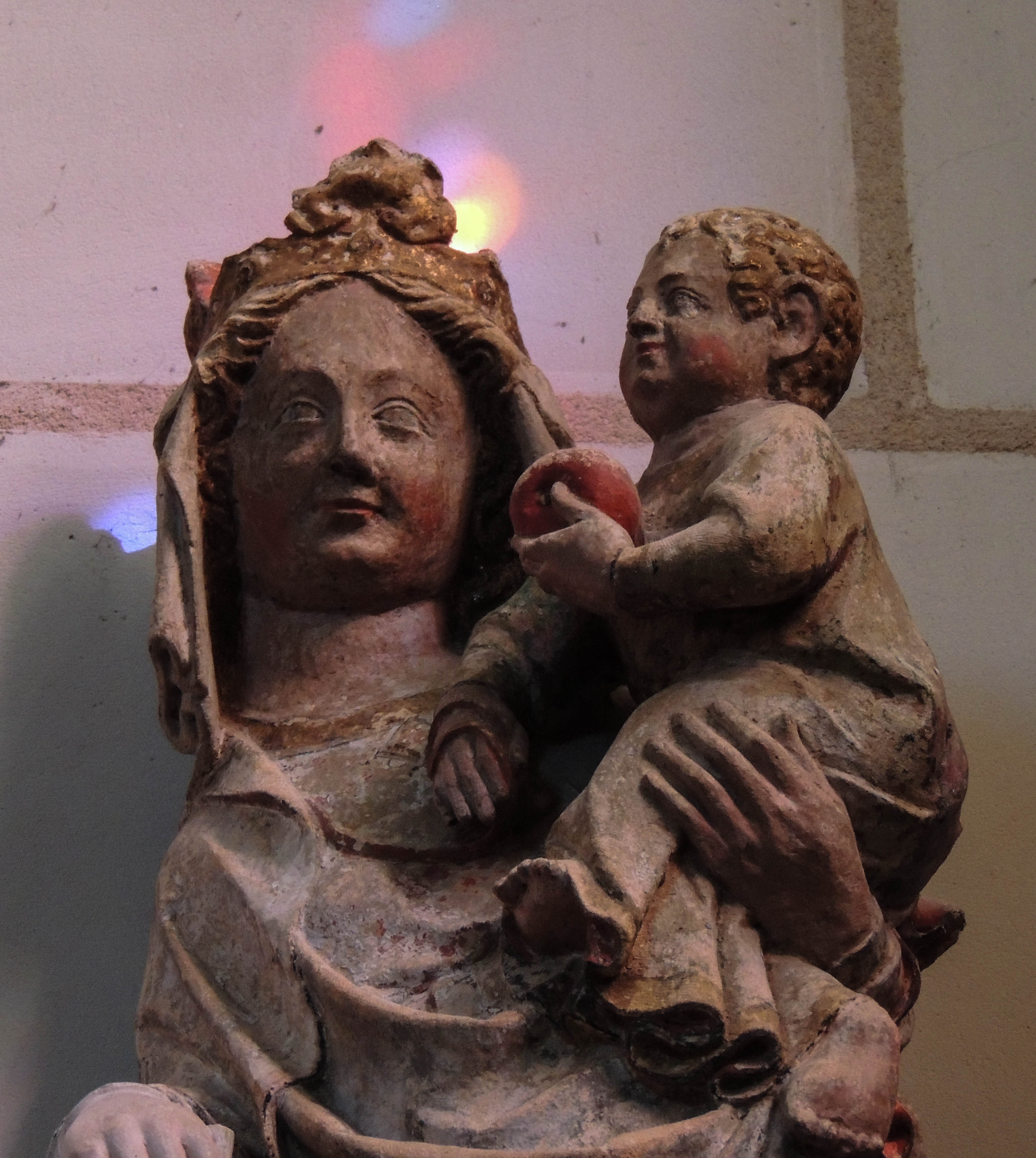
Detail of the Madonna and Child.

A number of stone statues adorn the building, including a Madonna and Child on the southern side of the transept. Dating from the late 14th century, making it the oldest statue in the church, it comes from Notre-Dame de Pringé, as does the 16th-century polychrome limestone St. John the Baptist in the south choir window.

In the late 1950s, work carried out in the village center unearthed three limestone statues dating from the early 16th century, which were later moved to the church of Saint-Martin. They could be attributed to Touraine sculptor Michel Colombe, or to his nephew Guillaume Regnault. Two of the statues, one representing the archangel St. Michael, the other an angel, were discovered in 1958 in the walls of an old house on rue Curie, while a larger group, representing the Education of the Virgin, was found in poor condition in the presbytery garden two years later. The latter may have come from the former communal cemetery adjacent to the church.

Of this group, only the statue of Saint Anne is preserved and installed in a niche at the back of the church forecourt. Having lost its head, it was restored in the 1990s by the parish priest, Georges Guillaume. The angel and bust of St. Michael are kept at the entrance to the church, and only the latter has been protected as a historical monument since 1982.

Elements of 16th-century sculpture rediscovered in the mid-20th century.

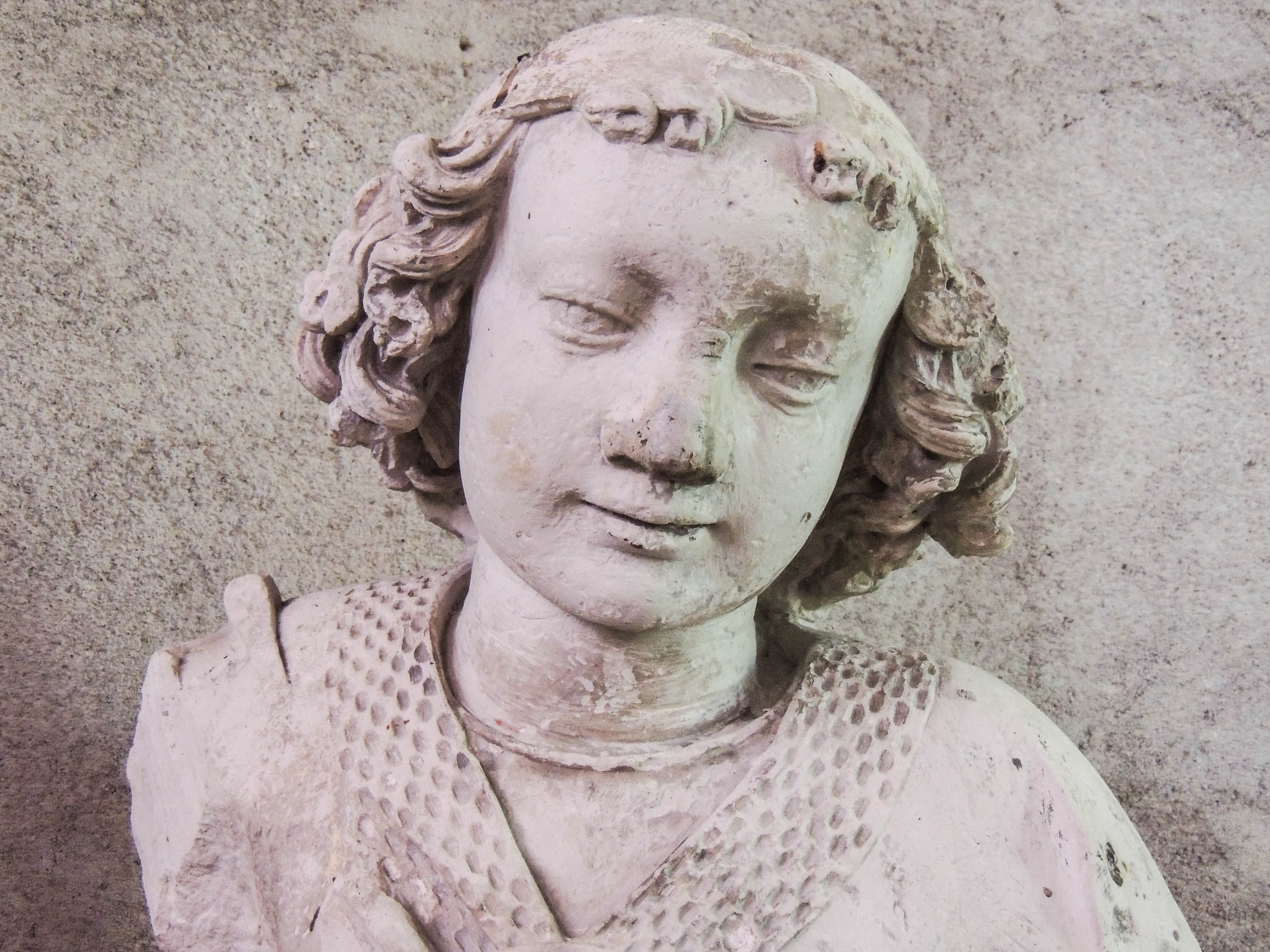
St. Michael.

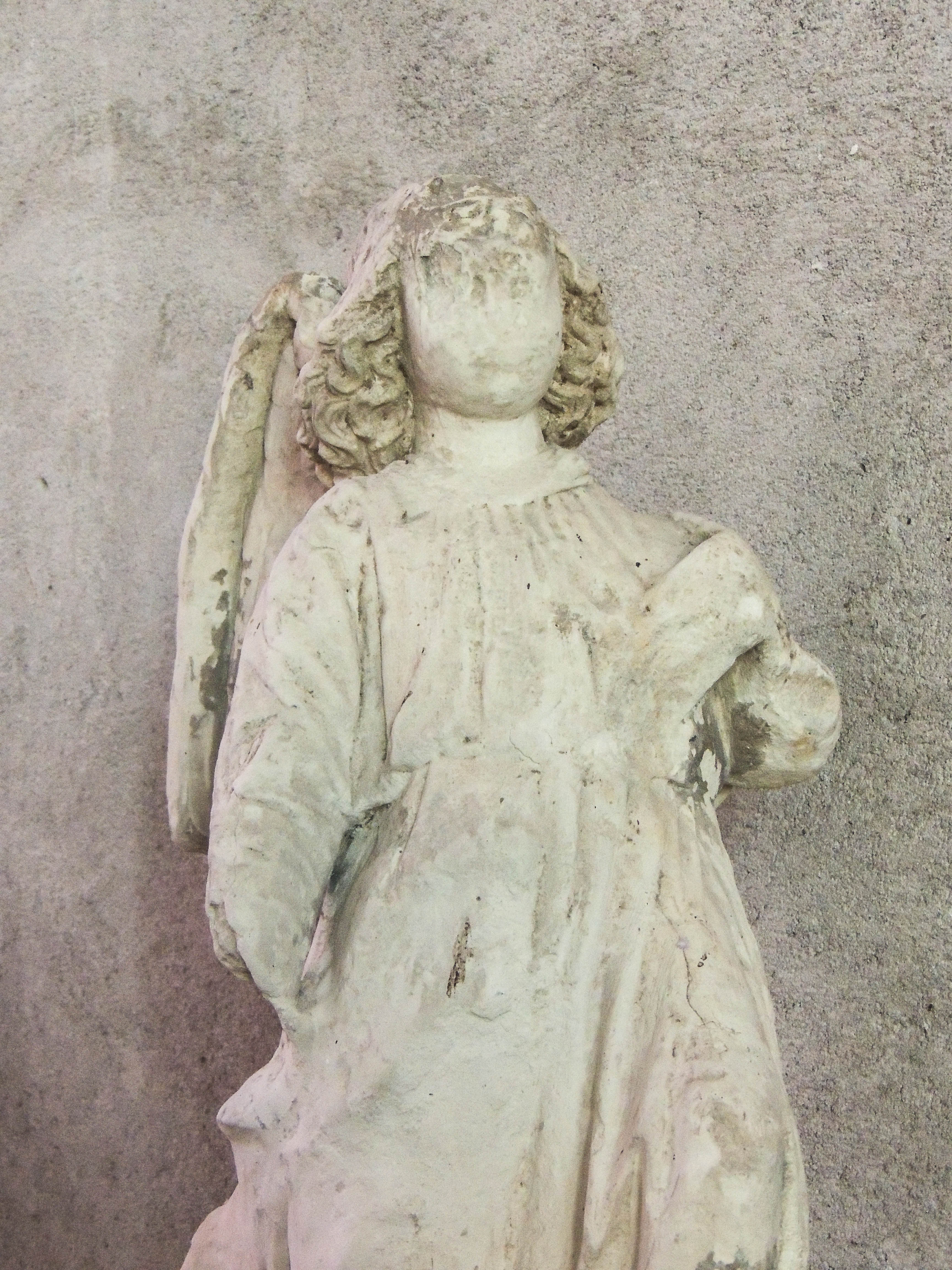
The angel.

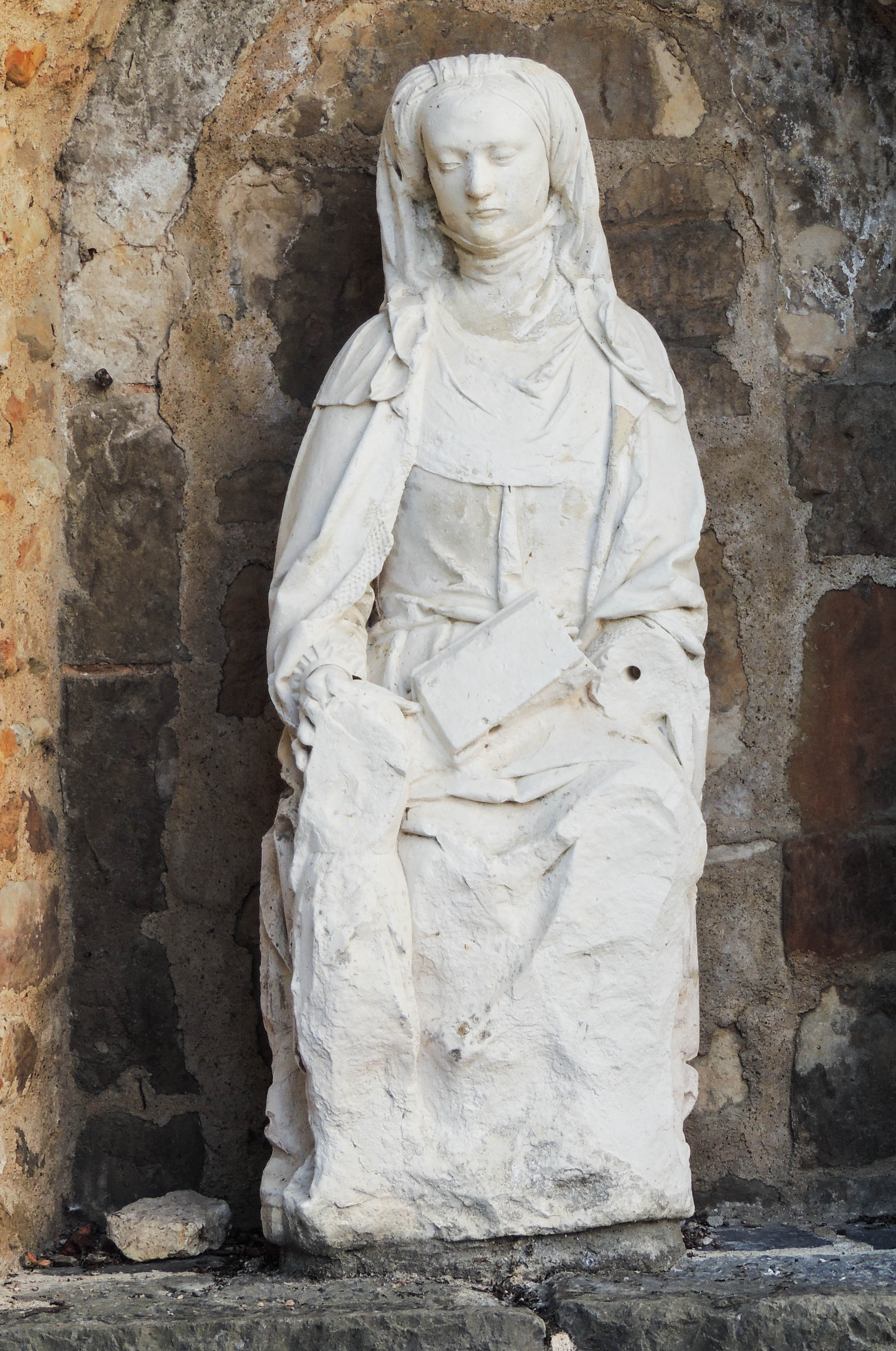
Saint Anne.

==== Terracotta statues ====
Last but not least, the church's choir features a number of terracotta statues. A two-meter-high Saint Martin in bishop's robes, created in 1668 by Fléchois sculptor Nicolas Bouteiller, can be seen behind the altar. Its current polychrome finish was created by Louis Renouard, a painter from Mance, in 1877. It dominates a series of five small, rather crudely executed statues representing Christ and four of his apostles seated.

In the south-east corner of the choir stands a statue of the Virgin and Child from the Pringé church. Dating from the first half of the 16th century, it is one of the oldest terracotta statues in the region. Other statues are probably isolated elements of larger groups, such as the kneeling St. Francis of Assisi in profile against the north wall, or the St. Joseph carrying his carpenter's tools.

Terracotta statues

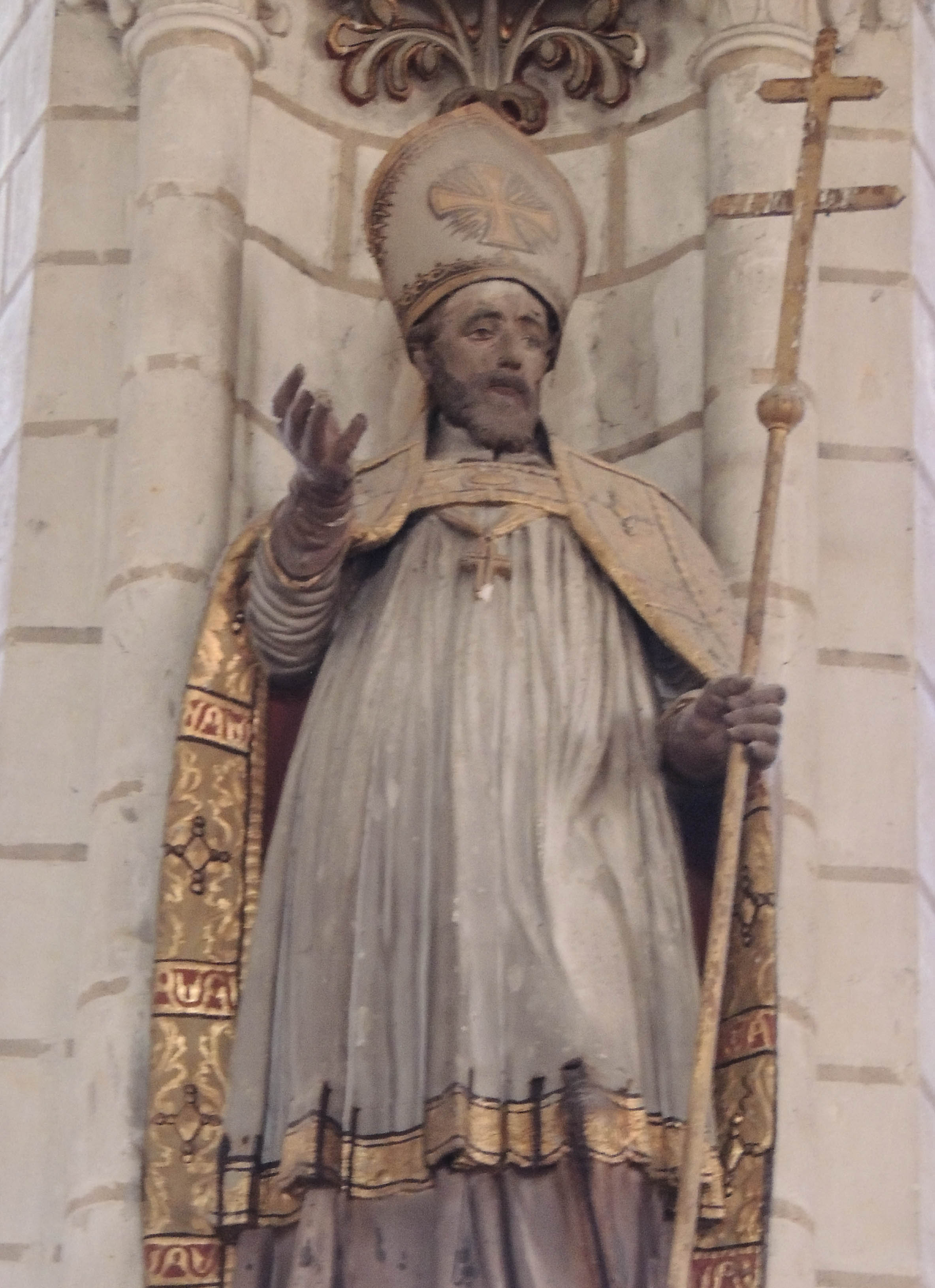
Saint Martin, in the center of the chevet (1668).

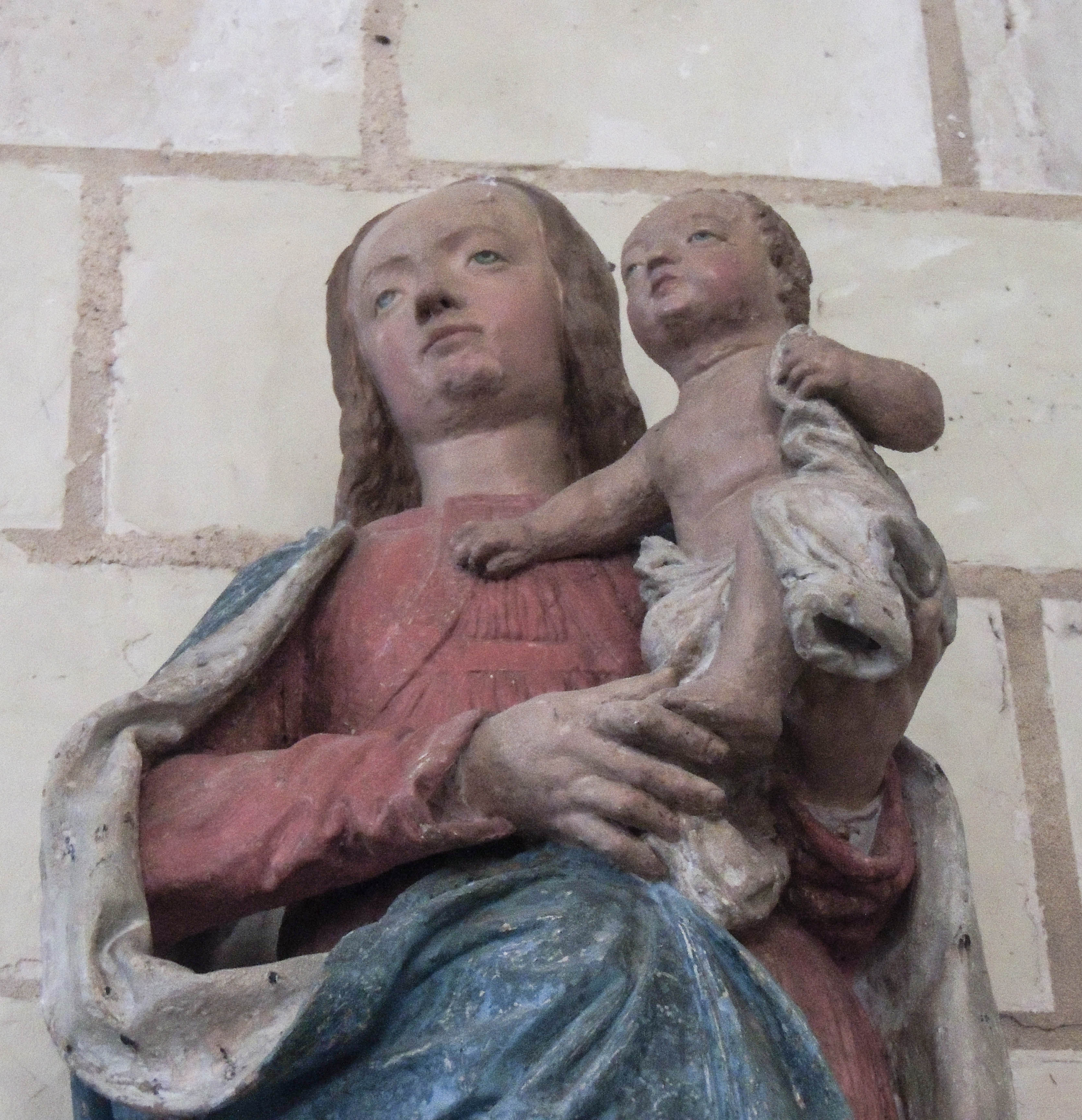
Madonna and Child (16th century).

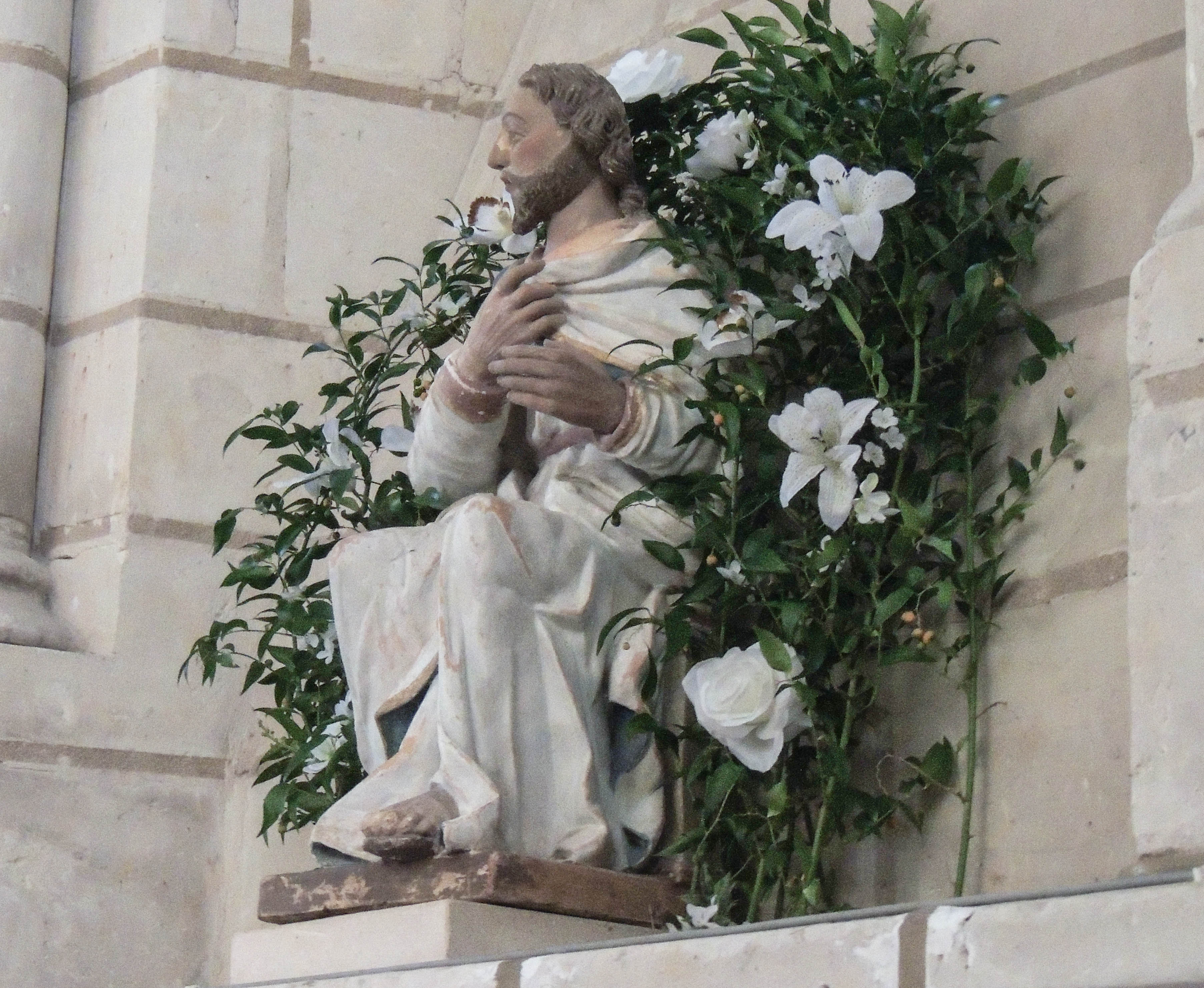
One of the apostles in the chevet (17th century).

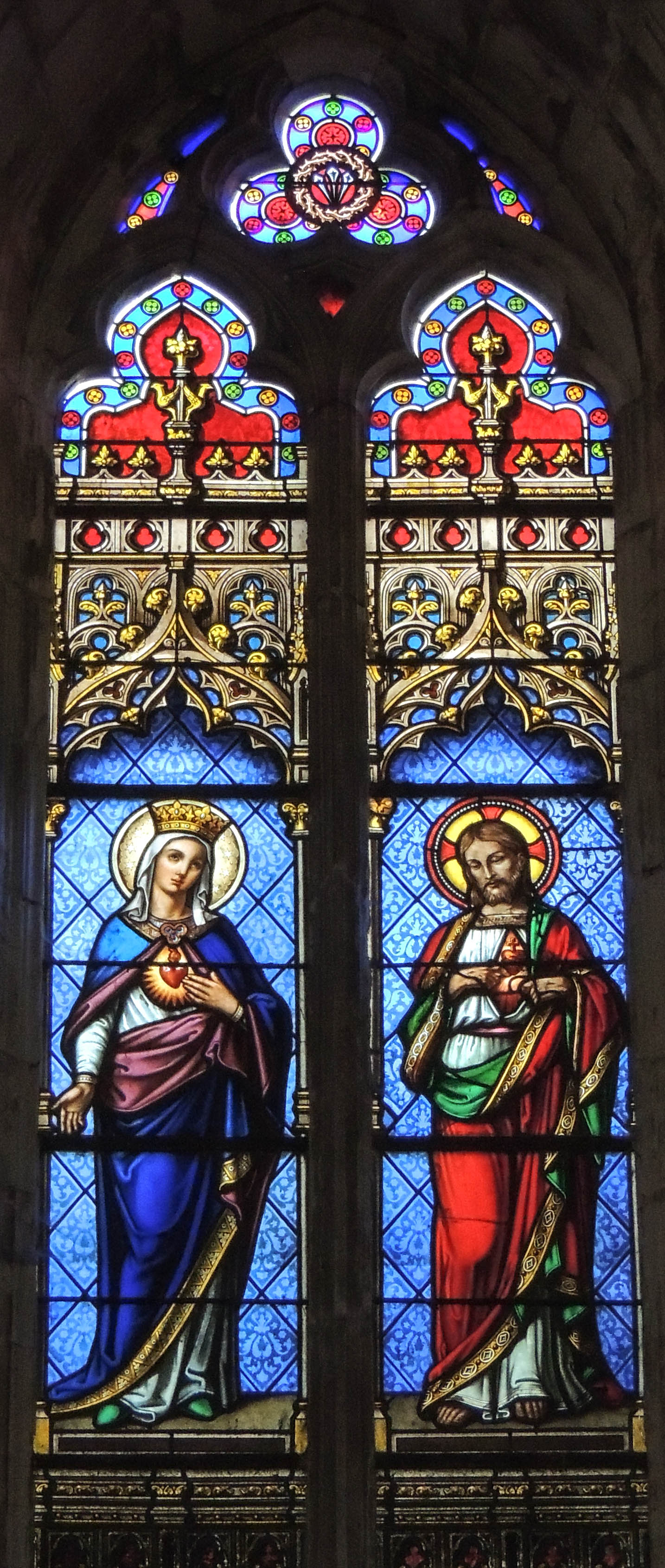
Mary and Jesus, in the left side of the transept.

==== Stained glass ====
The stained-glass windows in the choir and transept were made by François Fialeix, a master glassworker from Sarthe, in 1876. The four windows in the chevet represent episodes in the life of Jesus, from the Visitation of the Virgin Mary to the Resurrection. The large stained glass window in the south arm of the transept highlights the life of Saint Martin. It features six medallions set in a blue and red latticework, in a style reminiscent of the 13th century. Opposite, on the north arm of the transept, the figures of Jesus and the Virgin Mary are depicted. Finally, there are two large windows on either side of the choir: on the north side, Saint John and the handing over of the keys to Saint Peter, and on the south side, Saint Stephen and Saint Joseph accompanying Jesus.

The abstract stained-glass windows in the nave are more recent. They were designed by Emmanuel Putanier, of the Vitrail France workshop in Neuville-sur-Sarthe, in 2001. The stained glass window on the west façade, above the portal, depicts the Crucifixion. On the north side of the nave, the bay is built around three paths: the bodies, the cycle of days and the seasons. Opposite, on the south side, the composition of the two stained-glass windows links up with the 19th-century windows in the transept and choir, also overlooking Place Sainte-Apolline.

==== Various furnishings ====
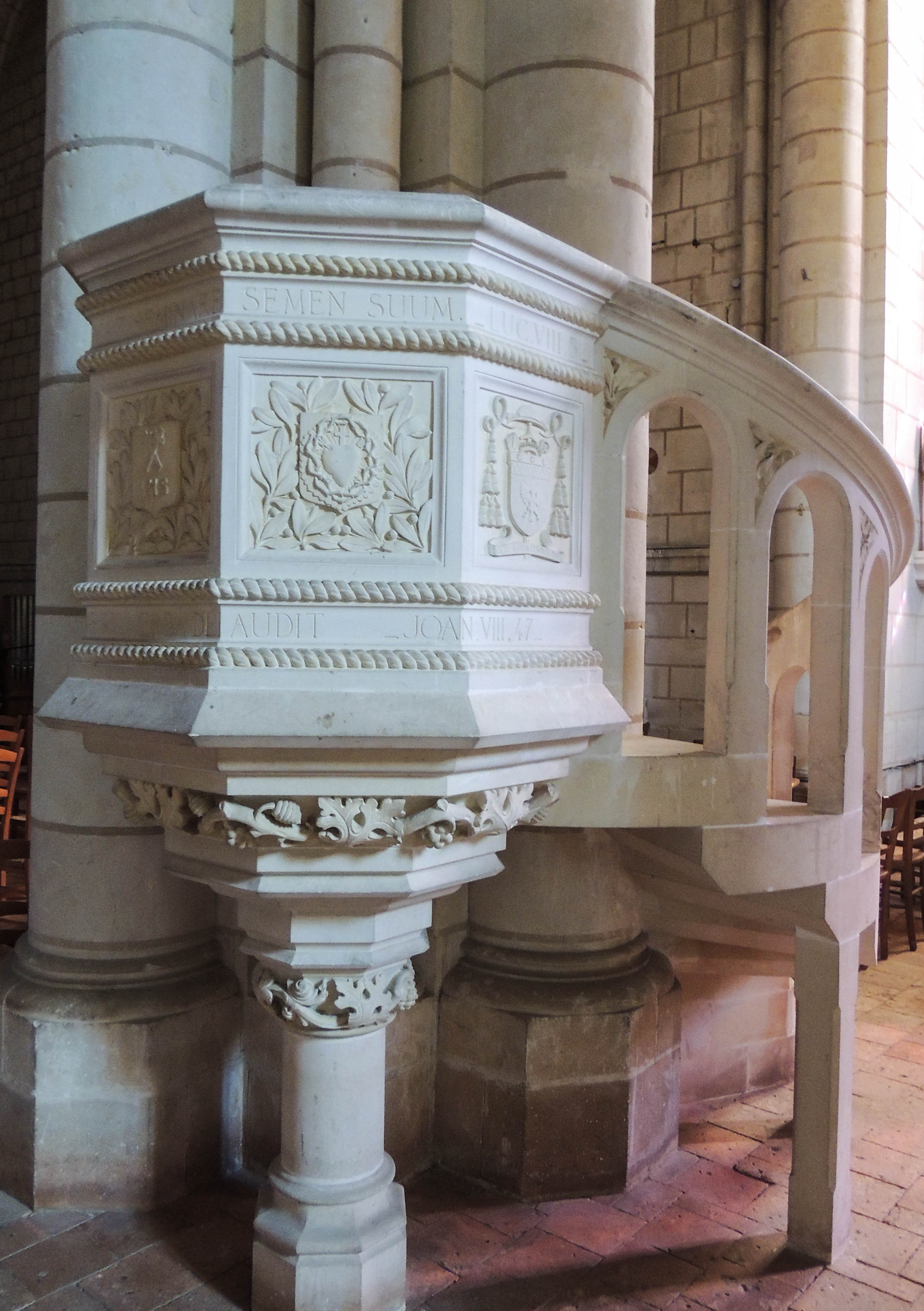
The limestone pulpit rebuilt in 1929.

The Saint-Martin de Luché church contains other remarkable items of furniture, such as a Merovingian stone sarcophagus, discovered during restoration work after the building burned down. It was classified as a historic monument in 1988. The 18th-century wrought-iron rood screen was listed the previous year.

The pulpit and baptismal font were donated in 1929 by the Rousseau and Gouin families to replace those destroyed by fire. The pulpit features the coat of arms and motto of Monseigneur Rousseau, the Luché-born bishop of Le Puy-en-Velay. The pulpit is partly decorated in the same way as the previous one, built in stone in the 16th century, notably with Christian symbols, including the IHS monogram, and quotations from the Gospels of Luke and John. It stands on a column with an octagonal base, while the basin is hexagonal in plan. The limestone baptismal font stands on two octagonal columns. The oval basin is fitted with four circular basins and decorated in high relief.

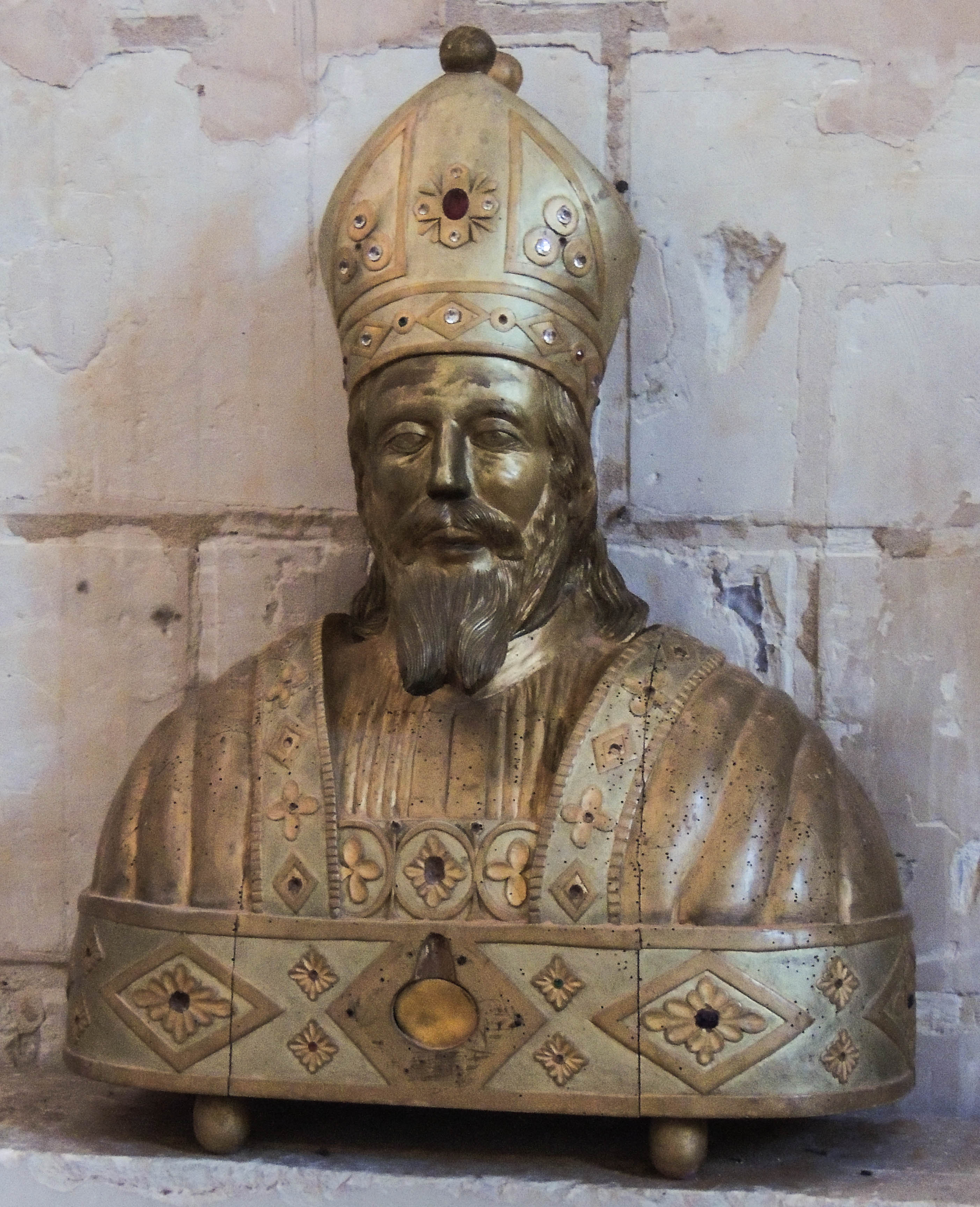
The reliquary-bust of St. Martin.

A reliquary-bust of Saint Martin stands on a secondary altar in the south arm of the transept. Made of gilded wood and adorned with artificial stones, it consists of three assembled parts and probably dates from the late 19th century. It depicts Saint Martin wearing a coif and miter.

Other secondary altars decorate the church, such as the one surmounted by a polychrome plaster statue of the Sacred Heart of Jesus, installed in the nave in 1877 following a donation from a parishioner. Two neo-Gothic limestone altars, installed in the same year, stand at the ends of the chevet.

The bell tower houses three bells. The largest, Anne-Marie-Martine, weighs 622 kg. Installed in 1925, during restoration work on the church, and blessed by Monsignor Norbert Rousseau, it was cast in Le Mans by the Bollée company. After the end of the Algerian war, two other bells were transferred to Luché from two Algerian parishes. One, Jeanne, weighs 440 kg and comes from the Bourkika church. The smaller Alice, weighing 305 kg, was blessed by Bishop Paul Chevalier of Le Mans on April 26, 1966.

== See also ==
- fr:Liste des monuments historiques de la Sarthe
- fr:Liste des églises de la Sarthe
- Luché-Pringé
- Plantagenet style

== Bibliography ==
- ^{(fr)} Robert Triger, "L'église de Luché", Revue historique et archéologique du Maine, vol. 77, 1921, pp. 214–228 (read online archive, accessed January 22, 2021).
- ^{(fr)} André Massat, "L'église de Luché", in Congrès archéologique de France. 119e session. Maine. 1961, Paris, Société française d'archéologie, 1961 (read online archive), pp. 163–169
- ^{(fr)} Norbert Dufourcq, "Les statues de l'église de Luché-Pringé", La Province du Maine, 5th series, t. IV, July–September 1990, pp. 233–248.
- ^{(fr)} Collective (pref. Abbé Georges Guillaume), Autrefois chez nous : Les histoires, les coutumes, les curiosités de nos villages : Luché-Pringé, Mareil-sur-Loir, Saint-Jean-de-la-Motte, Thorée-les-Pins, Association Autrefois chez nous, 1998, 318 p. (ISBN 978-2-9513033-0-0)
- ^{(fr)} Françoise Mousset-Pinard (ed.), Christine Toulier (texts), Jean-Baptiste Darrasse (photographs) and Virgine Desvigne (maps), Le Lude en Vallée du Loir, Nantes, Éditions 303, coll. "Images du Patrimoine" (no. 285), 2015, 144 p. (ISBN 979-10-93572-11-6).
- ^{(fr)} Parcours, l'église Saint-Martin de Luché, PETR Pays vallée du Loir, 2020, 12 p. (read online archive [PDF]).
