= Dissé-sous-le-Lude =

- Part of Le Lude
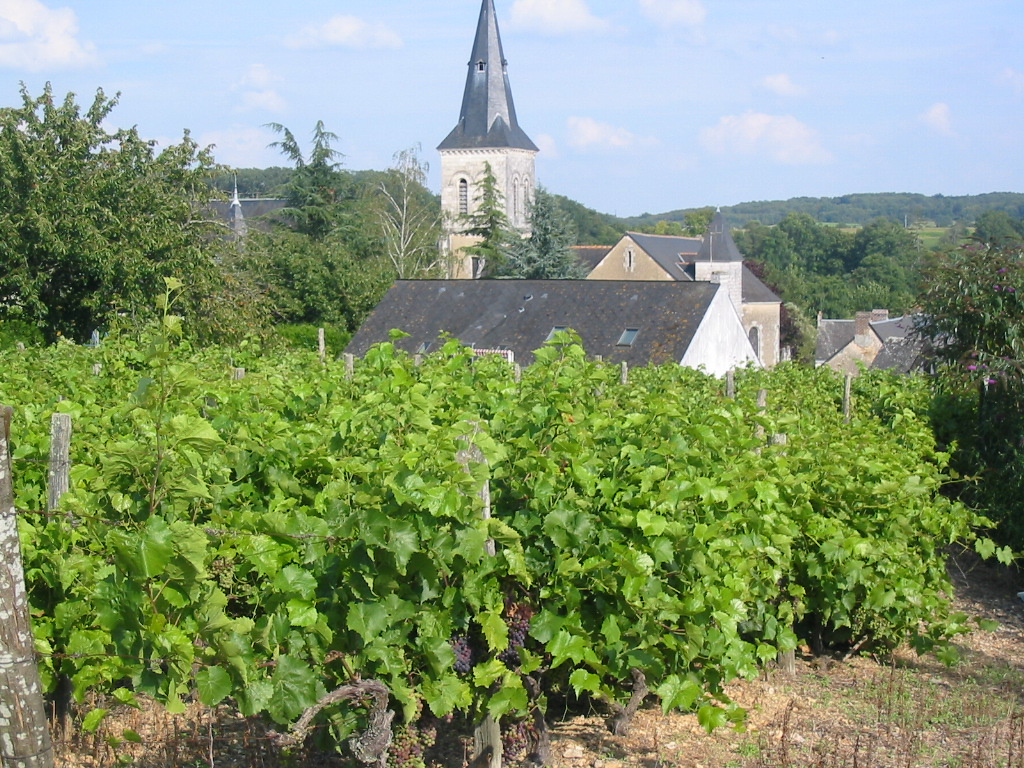
- Bell tower
- Location of Dissé-sous-le-Lude
- Location within France Location within Pays de la Loire
- Coordinates: 47°36′28″N 0°09′16″E
- Country: France
- Region: Pays de la Loire
- Department: Sarthe
- Arrondissement: La Flèche
- Canton: Le Lude
- Commune: Le Lude
- Area^{1}: 22.37 km^{2} (8.64 sq mi)
- Highest elevation: 111 m (364 ft)
- Lowest elevation: 41 m (135 ft)
- Population (2022): 483
  - Density: 21.6/km^{2} (55.9/sq mi)
- Time zone: UTC+01:00 (CET)
  - Summer (DST): UTC+02:00 (CEST)
- Postal code: 72800
- ^{1} French Land Register data, which excludes lakes, ponds, glaciers > 1 km^{2} (0.386 sq mi or 247 acres) and river estuaries.

Dissé-sous-le-Lude (French pronunciation: [dise su lə lyd], literally Dissé under Le Lude) is a former commune in the Sarthe department in the Pays de la Loire region in north-western France. On 1 January 2018, it was merged into the commune of Le Lude. Its population was 483 in 2022.

== See also ==
- Communes of the Sarthe department
