= Château du Lude =

13th-century castle in the Loire Valley, France

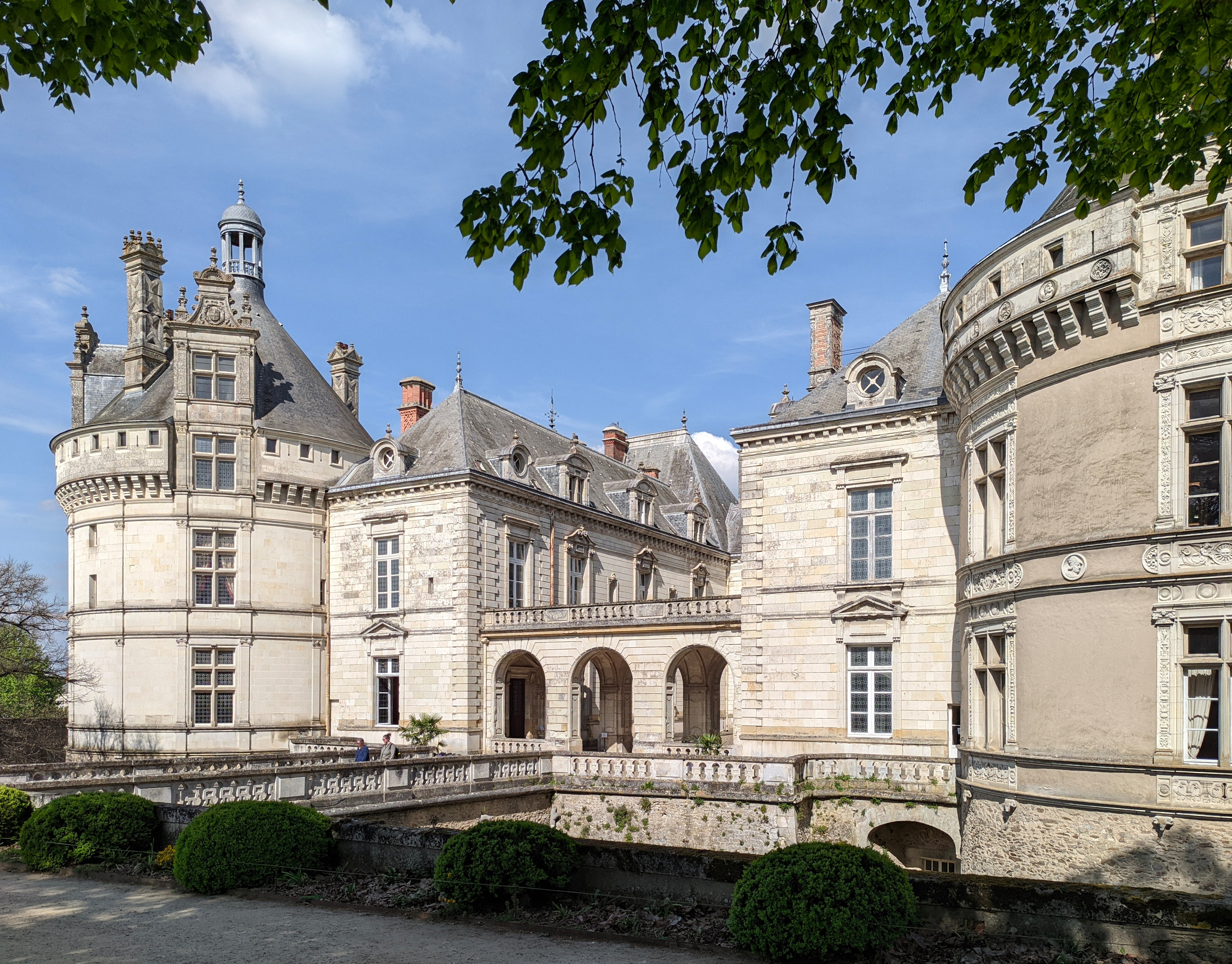
- Interactive map of the Château du Lude area

General information
- Location: Le Lude, France
- Coordinates: 47.6475°N 0.158889°E
- Construction started: 13th century
- Completed: 19th century
- Owner: Louis-Jean de Nicolaÿ

Website
- http://www.lelude.com

The Château du Lude is one of the many monumental châteaux of the Loire Valley (Vallée de la Loire) in France. The château is situated in the commune of Le Lude in the Sarthe department in the region of Pays de la Loire and stands at the crossroads of Anjou, Maine and Touraine. Le Lude is the most northerly château of the Loire Valley and one of the last important historic castles in France, still inhabited by the same family for the last 260 years. The château is testimony to four centuries of French architecture, as a stronghold transformed into an elegant house during the Renaissance and the 18th century. The monument is located in the valley of Le Loir. Its gardens have evolved throughout the centuries. It is a harmonious combination of French design and an English-style landscape, with a rose garden, topiaries, a labyrinth and a botanical walk.

== History ==
The original fortress was built between the 10th and 11th centuries on the banks of the river Loir in order to defend Anjou from the incursions of the Normans and then the English during the Hundred Years War.

Louis XI's chamberlain, Jehan de Daillon, took possession of the Lude estates at the end of the 15th century. He employed Italian artists to convert the fortress into a residence.

In 1751, Le Lude became the property of Joseph Duvelaër, head of the Council of The French East India Company. His niece, the Marquise de la Vieuville, built the classical wing in the style of Louis XVI and defended the château during the French Revolution. Her descendants, the Talhouët-Roy, carried out extensive works of restoration throughout the 19th century. Le Lude has been passed down to the current occupants Count and Countess Louis-Jean de Nicolaÿ, who have carried on its tradition of restoration and decoration.

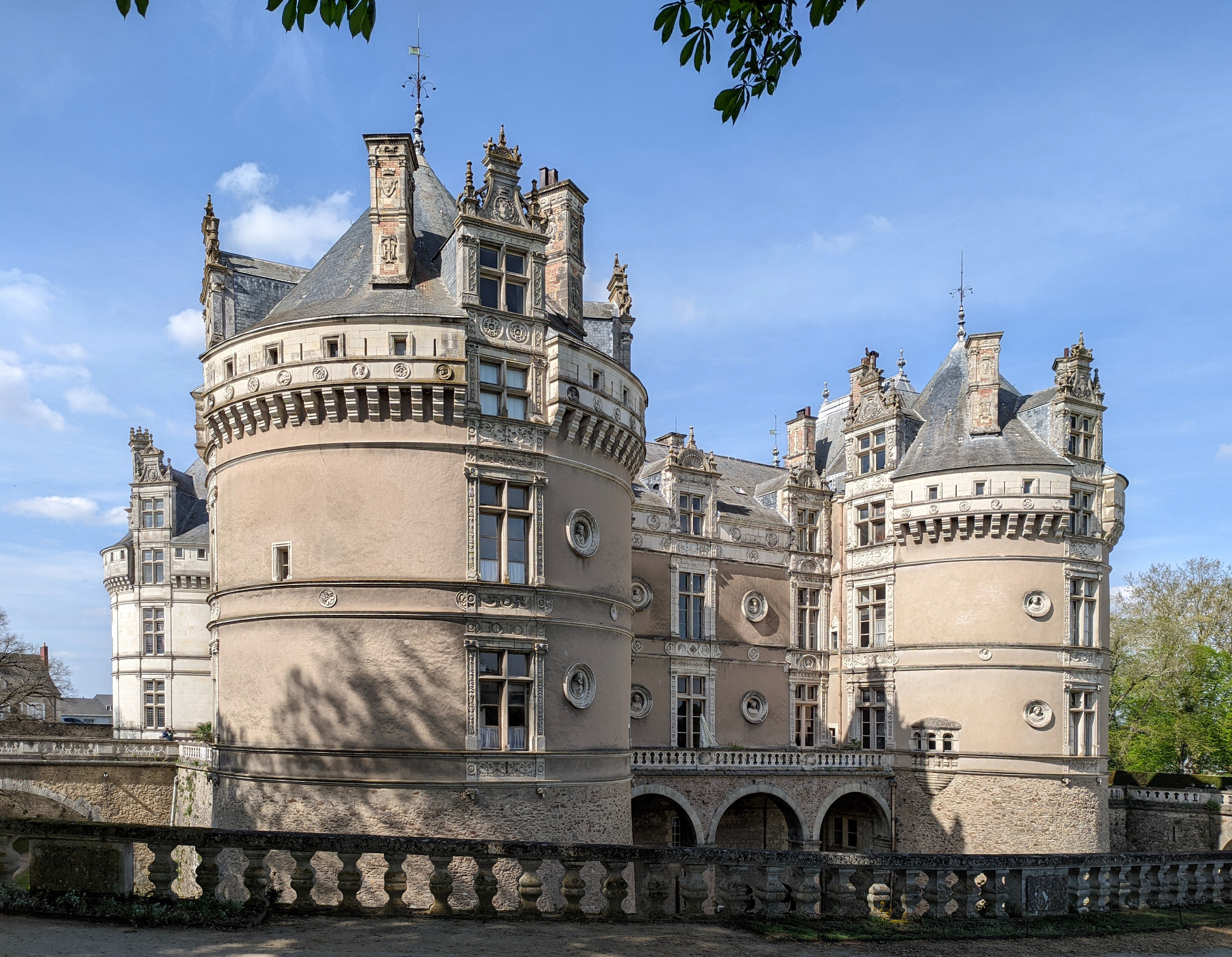

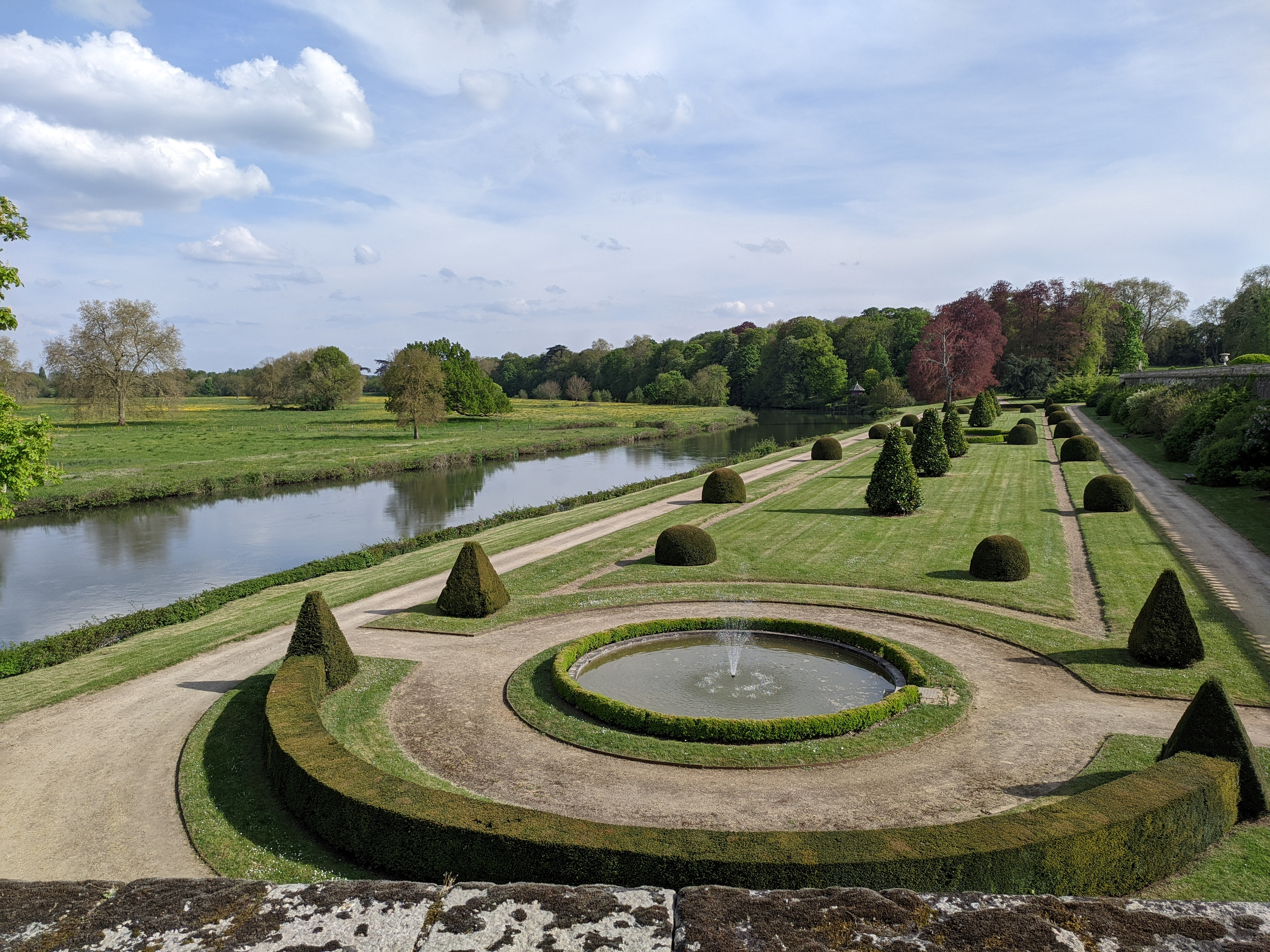

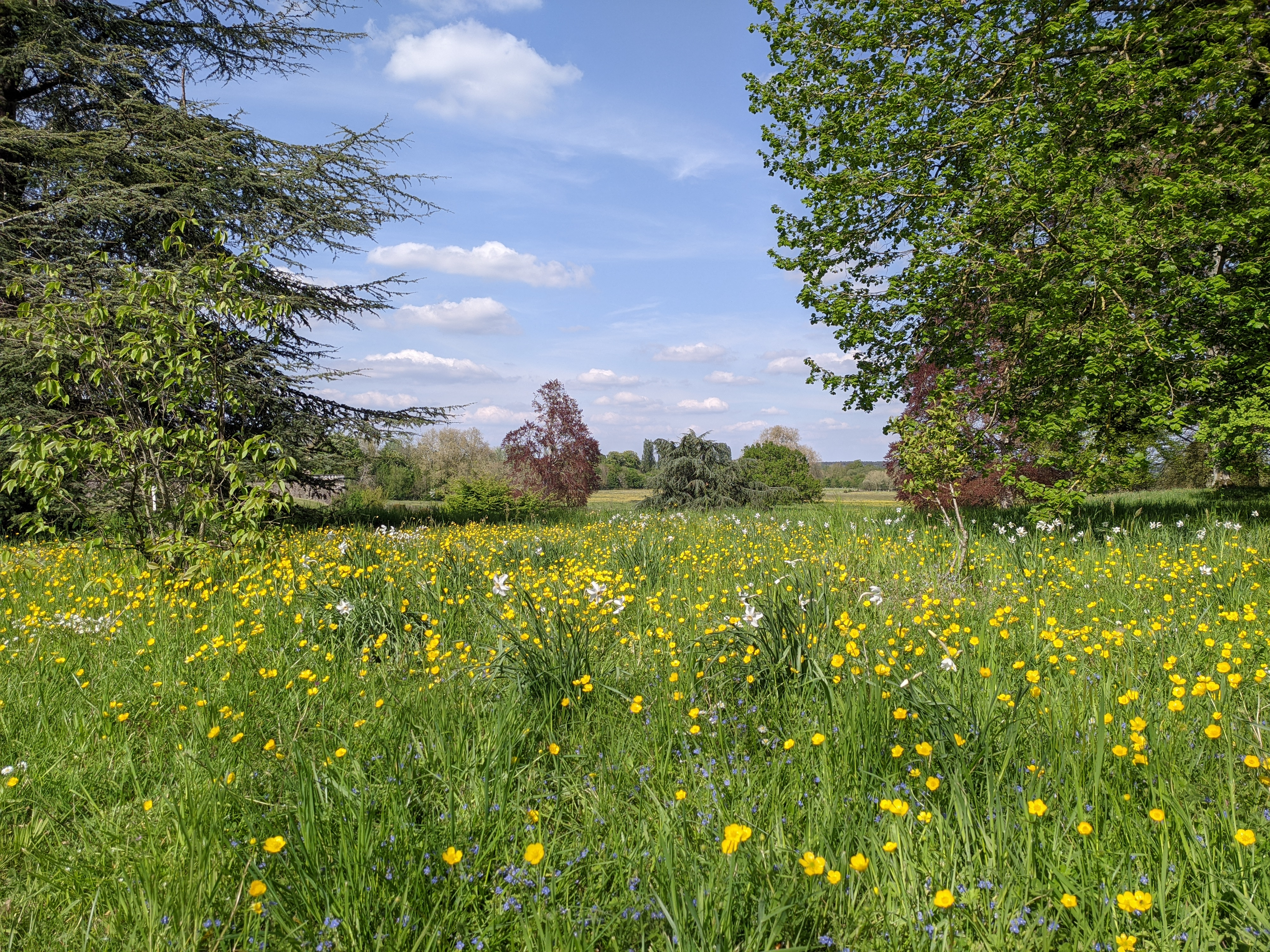

== See also ==
- List of castles in France
- Château
