= Le Lude =

- Commune
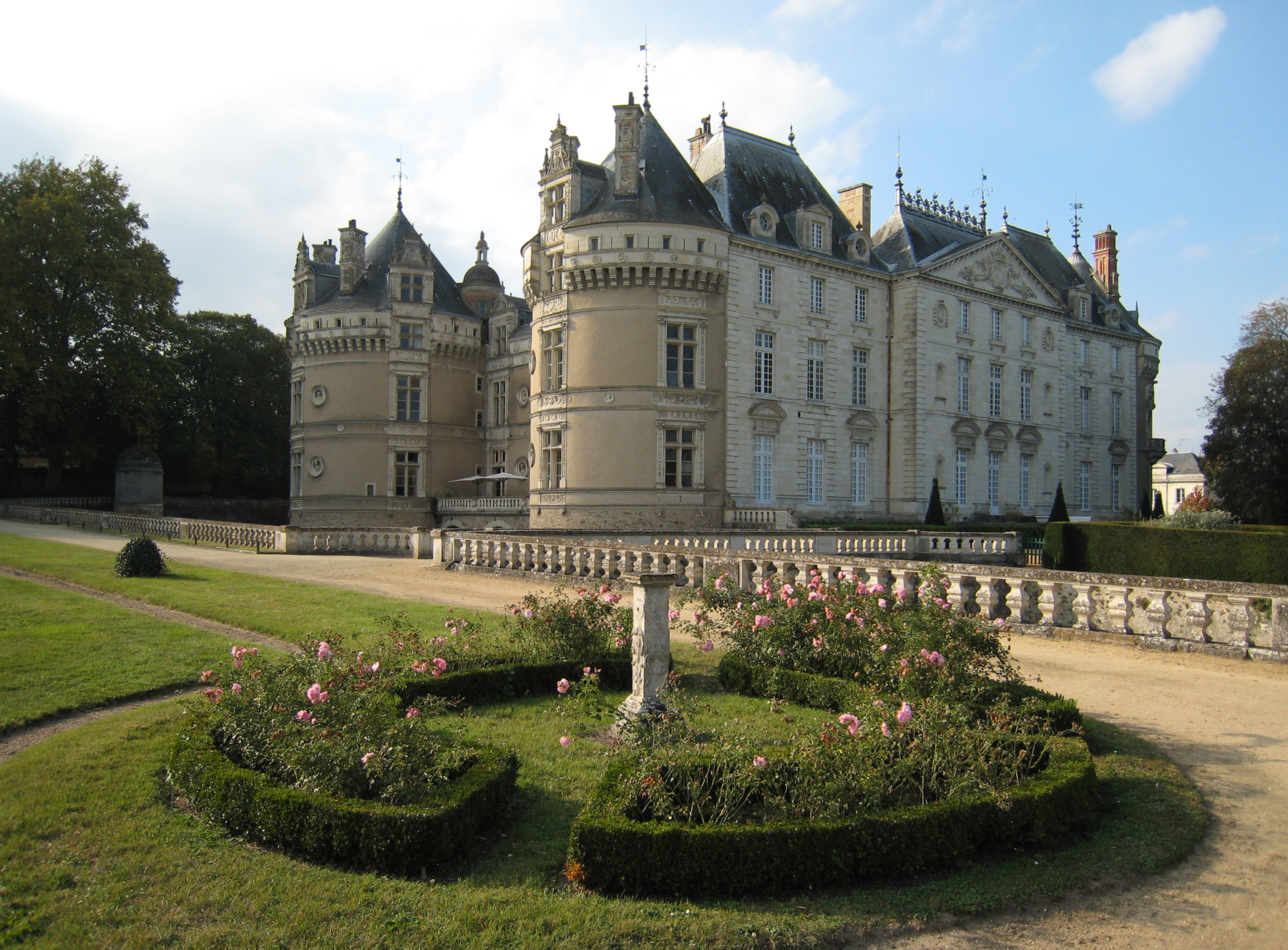
- The Château du Lude

- Coat of arms
- Location of Le Lude
- Location within France Location within Pays de la Loire
- Coordinates: 47°38′45″N 0°09′14″E
- Country: France
- Region: Pays de la Loire
- Department: Sarthe
- Arrondissement: La Flèche
- Canton: Le Lude
- Intercommunality: Sud Sarthe

Government
  - Mayor (2020–2026): Béatrice Latouche
- Area^{1}: 68.36 km^{2} (26.39 sq mi)
- Highest elevation: 93 m (305 ft)
- Lowest elevation: 30 m (98 ft)
- Population (2023): 3,983
  - Density: 58.27/km^{2} (150.9/sq mi)
- Demonym(s): Ludois, Ludoise
- Time zone: UTC+01:00 (CET)
  - Summer (DST): UTC+02:00 (CEST)
- INSEE/Postal code: 72176 /72800
- ^{1} French Land Register data, which excludes lakes, ponds, glaciers > 1 km^{2} (0.386 sq mi or 247 acres) and river estuaries.

Le Lude (French pronunciation: [lə lyd]) is a commune in the Sarthe department in the region of Pays de la Loire, northwestern France. On 1 January 2018, the former commune of Dissé-sous-le-Lude was merged into Le Lude.

== Population ==
Population data refer to the area corresponding with the commune as of January 2025.

Historical population
Year	Pop.	±% p.a.
1968	4,396	—
1975	4,681	+0.90%
1982	5,138	+1.34%
1990	5,018	−0.29%
1999	4,757	−0.59%
2007	4,638	−0.32%
2012	4,519	−0.52%
2017	4,255	−1.20%
2023	3,983	−1.09%
Source: INSEE

== See also ==
- Communes of the Sarthe department
- History of Le Lude
