= History of Le Lude =

History of Le Lude, France

The coat of arms of the commune of Le Lude reads as follows: Azure, a cross engrailed argent. This coat of arms, originally that of the Daillon family, was officially adopted by the commune of Le Lude on July 17, 1961, but was already in use in 1669.

The history of Le Lude encompasses all ancient or recent events related to the town of Le Lude in Sarthe, France. The megalithic complexes in the Loir Valley provide evidence of the region's occupation since the Neolithic period. The spur of the Vaux camp and the Cherré site, both located a few kilometers east of Le Lude, demonstrate the region's continued dynamism from the Bronze Age to Antiquity.

During the Middle Ages, Le Lude emerged as a formidable stronghold on the border between the counties of Anjou and Maine. The defensive apparatus of Le Lude consisted of a feudal motte and a stone castle. The town's development was facilitated by its milling activity and the establishment of several religious buildings. However, it subsequently experienced the challenges of the Hundred Years' War, during which the English occupied Le Lude Castle from 1425 to 1427. The town of Le Lude experienced a new period of growth and prosperity during the Renaissance era, thanks to the efforts of its lord, Jean Daillon, who undertook the castle restoration from its ruins. His successors continued to develop the town by establishing hospitals and leather and woolen cloth factories. In 1545, the lordship of Le Lude was elevated to a county, and in 1675, it was elevated to a duchy-peerage. The lordship later had a salt storehouse in the Seneschal of Baugé.

During the French Revolution, the commune of Le Lude was attached to the Sarthe department. Following the Restoration, it was repeatedly affected by unrest related to the Chouannerie, with the royalist troops of Bernard de la Frégeolière seizing control of the area on two occasions. In 1816, four men who were part of a group known as the "Vultures of Bonaparte", demonstrating their loyalty to the emperor, were executed in Le Lude.

The 19th century saw the economic and industrial development of the town, facilitated by the arrival of the railway and then electricity, and the establishment of factories such as the Courbe paper mill. The town suffered a significant loss of life during the First World War, with the death of 123 of its inhabitants, and experienced German occupation during the Second World War. Russian prisoners were interned in the area, and a munitions storage camp was established between the communes of Le Lude and those of Savigny-sous-le-Lude and Thorée-les-Pins. The explosion of the Le Lude station on March 3, 1944, was one of the most notable local events of the period. Similarly, the deportation of several young people who resisted compulsory work service (STO) triggered a spontaneous protest against the occupying forces.

Following the conclusion of the previous conflict, Le Lude distinguished itself through the implementation of one of France's inaugural sound and light displays. However, the town, along with the entirety of the south of Sarthe, experienced a pronounced decline in industrial activity during the latter half of the 20th century and the early years of the 21st century.

== Territorial occupation from prehistory to antiquity ==
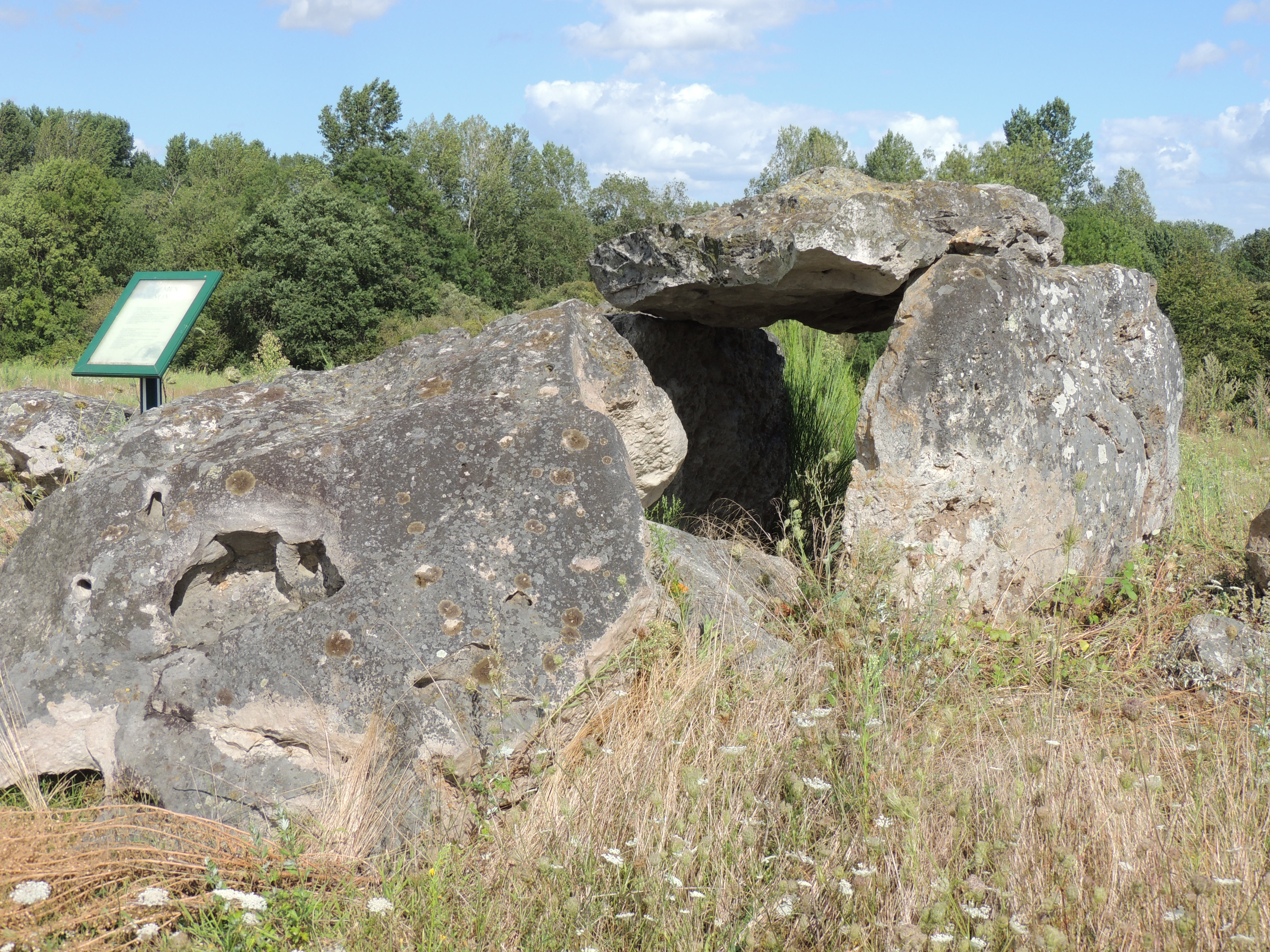
The dolmen of Amenon, one of the many megaliths in the Loir valley.

The Ludois region has been inhabited by humans for a very long time, with evidence of Neolithic occupation. This is indicated by the presence of several megalithic complexes. One such complex is the dolmen, known as "de Cuissé", located on the Le Lude territory. However, this dolmen was destroyed in 1928. The menhir of Loup-Pendu, situated four kilometers southwest of Le Lude in the commune of Savigny-sous-le-Lude, has been preserved. Moreover, numerous other dolmens or menhirs have been reported in neighboring communes, along with several protohistoric enclosures. The dolmen of Amenon, excavated in the 1970s in Saint-Germain-d'Arcé, was used as a burial place at the end of the fourth millennium BC. Two other dolmens are listed near the farms "la Persillière" and "Colombier" in Aubigné-Racan.

Furthermore, the "camp de Vaux", a spur located 6 kilometers from Le Lude and overlooking the Loir, was occupied from the 7th century BC. Its fortification phase was accompanied, in the northeast and the valley, at the Cherré site, by the creation of a necropolis from the Bronze Age and the Hallstatt period.

In the era of the Roman Empire, Le Lude was situated on the route that connected Le Mans to Poitiers, traversing Coulongé. Its territory was at the northern border of the civitas of the Andecavi, which followed the course of the Loir. It was located at the crossroads of the Turones' territory to the southeast and that of the Aulerci Cenomani to the north. During this period, the commercial significance of the Cherré site increased considerably. Archaeological excavations have revealed a theater, a forum, a temple, baths, and the remnants of an aqueduct. Additionally, three kilometers north of Le Lude, on a hillside overlooking the Loir, the remains of a Gallo-Roman villa have been unearthed in the vicinity of the Grifferie castle.

== Le Lude in the Middle Ages ==
=== From the Early Middle Ages to the 13th century ===
From the end of the Antiquity period onwards, a settlement seems to have developed in Le Lude around its church, which is first mentioned in Actus pontificum Cenomannis in the 4th century. Furthermore, the discovery of a coin struck in Le Lude around 650 provides evidence of the city's economic activity at the beginning of the Middle Ages. The bridge was fortified with a postern flanked by towers on the right bank, which defended access.

The initial Viking incursions into Anjou between 853 and 873 prompted local lords to construct fortresses to safeguard their territories. Given its pivotal location at the border of Maine, Anjou, and Touraine, the site of Le Lude assumed particular significance, leading to the erection of the "Fort de la Motte" on the left bank of the Loir. The original castle was constructed approximately one hundred meters to the north of the current castle. It was a primitive structure comprising a motte on which a keep was erected, surrounded by moats and palisades. The site was later established as a castellany under the name of La Motte-sous-le-Lude.

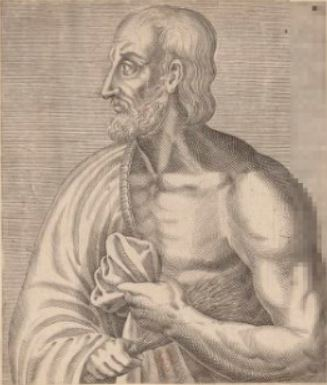
Foulques Nerra, Count of Anjou, owned the fortress of Le Lude in the 11th century.

Another consequence of the Norman expeditions in Anjou was the plundering of the town of Le Lude and the destruction of its church. In 976, Geoffrey Grisegonelle, Count of Anjou and Lord of Le Lude, donated it to the Abbey of Saint-Jouin-de-Marnes, Poitou. The church was not rebuilt, and only a chapel was erected on its ruins. In 1085, Lord Hubert de Beaumont transferred the chapel's custody to the Abbey of Saint-Aubin d'Angers’ monks. On June 25, 1113, they established a priory at the site, under the patronage of Saint Vincent. They were also responsible for the construction of the new church, which bears the same name.

Before this, in 1027, the Count of Anjou, Fulk Nerra, was besieged at Le Lude Castle by Duke Alan of Brittany, who sought to exact retribution for the mistreatment of his ally, Herbert Wakedog, Count of Maine. Two years prior, the latter had been captured in Saintes by Fulk Nerra, who sought to seize his possessions. He was released in exchange for land and hostages. Surprised by the attack of the Duke of Brittany and lacking the necessary troops to sustain the fight, Fulk Nerra immediately submitted and returned the men and property he had seized. (Note: Candé 1889, pp. 126–129)

The castle of Le Lude enjoyed a lengthy period of prosperity over the centuries. Its lord held rights over the Loir River from Vaas to the Vilaines mill in Luché-Pringé, and milling activity was highly developed within its territory. The Thienval mill is referenced in the cartulary of the Abbey of Saint-Aubin d'Angers as early as the beginning of the 11th century. This abbey also owned the mills of Rihouy (Note: This mill, like the one in Pontfour, is not situated on the Loir River but rather on the Ris-Ouï stream, as it is currently spelled.) and Pontfour. Additionally, several mills were established on the Malidor site. Richard III de Beaumont, Lord of Le Lude from 1236 to 1239, granted the tithe to the Abbey of Notre-Dame de la Charité d'Angers. Furthermore, from the end of the 12th century, the hamlet of Raillon developed approximately 1,500 meters south of the town, on the banks of the Marconne. The initial gathering of inhabitants occurred around a priory established in 1190 by the monks of Saint-Aubin d'Angers. Subsequently, a leper house was constructed in 1202 at the behest of Raoul VIII of Beaumont-au-Maine near the Chapel of Sainte-Marie de Raillon.

=== Construction of the current castle and the Hundred Years' War ===
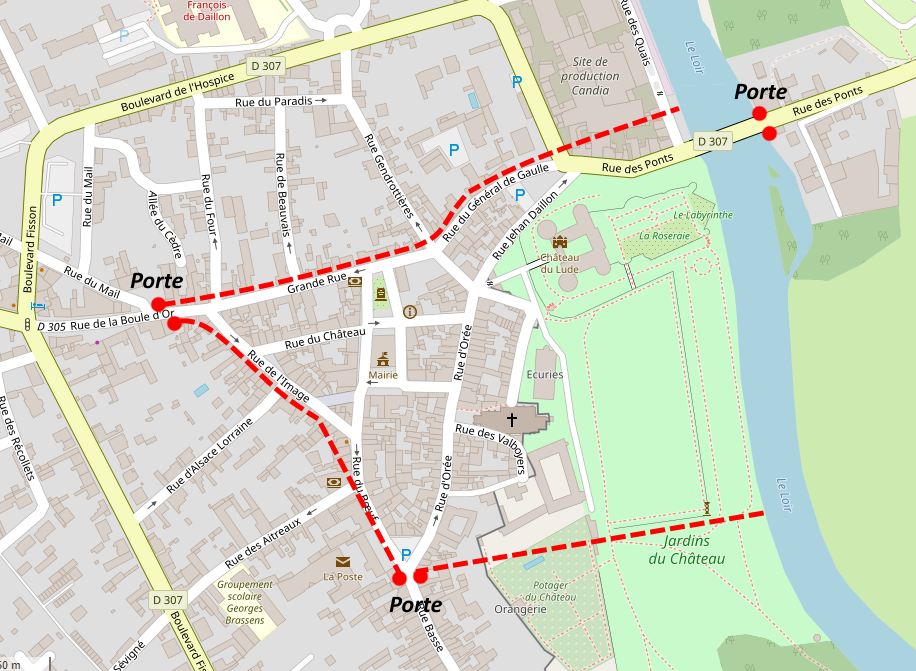
The boundaries of the town of Le Lude in the Middle Ages, based on the work of Jacques Bellanger.

Towards the end of the 13th century, the Fort de la Motte was abandoned. The foundations of a masonry fortress were laid further south, giving rise to the current castle. The construction of this medieval fortress spanned two centuries, and significant defensive measures were put in place. These included the digging of moats, the construction of a masonry spur, and the building of ramparts facing the Loir. Louis II de Beaumont, Lord of Le Lude, was a member of the French troops led by Bertrand du Guesclin. He perished during the Battle of Cocherel. (Note: Candé 1889, pp. 145–150)

Le Lude's strategic location on the border of Maine, within the territory of Anjou, rendered it a significant site during the Hundred Years' War. The fortified castle of Le Lude, which belonged to the Viscountess of Beaumont, Isabeau de Bourbon, constituted a strategic point. Captain Guillaume de Méron was appointed to oversee the defense of the castle. The English launched two attacks on the castle, likely between April and September 1371. Méron promptly initiated a series of measures to reinforce the fortifications. During the initial assault, the English filled the moats with wood piled up in front of the ramparts but were repelled, with notable assistance from Jean III of Bueil. Under the command of Robert Knolles, the English attempted a second assault, which proved unsuccessful. Some of the troops then withdrew to construct a fort at Vaas.

In 1417, the English undertook several incursions into the Loir Valley, resulting in the capture of the castles of Gallerande and Malicorne. (Note: Candé 1889, p. 178) However, following the French army's defeat at Verneuil in 1424, the English proceeded to complete the conquest of Maine. In the fall of 1425, the Earl of Warwick ordered the seizure of Le Lude Castle. He promptly appointed Guillaume Gladsdall, who had already been captain of Malicorne, to govern the area. (Note: Candé 1889, pp. 166–167) He remained in control for a brief period following his appointment as bailiff of Alençon and captain of the fortress of Fresnay in 1426. He was subsequently replaced by his lieutenant, William Blackburn, who led a garrison of 1,200 men. For the local population, the English occupation was particularly onerous, as elucidated by Dr. Paul Candé: "The subjected parishes were obliged to procure, for a fee, a certificate issued in the name of the Duke of Bedford, regent in Anjou, attesting their oath of obedience to the English. [...] The number of certificates required corresponded to the number of hearths in each parish". "Each parish was also required to pay a ransom or composition, called appatis, to ensure protection from the pillaging of the English garrisons". (Note: Candé 1889, pp. 169–171) However, this was insufficient to guarantee peace for the local population, who continued to suffer from numerous pillages. Additionally, the Chronicle of the Abbey of Bourgueil indicates that in 1427, on Saint Denis's Day, the English garrison of Le Lude collaborated with those of neighboring towns to perpetrate a series of incursions into the territory situated between Beaufort-en-Vallée and Bourgueil. Ultimately, the English occupation endured for a mere two years. By the end of 1427, the French troops, led by Ambroise de Loré, successfully recaptured Le Lude Castle following a prolonged siege. Notably, Gilles de Rais and Jean de Bueil played pivotal roles in this operation.

== Le Lude in the Modern Era ==
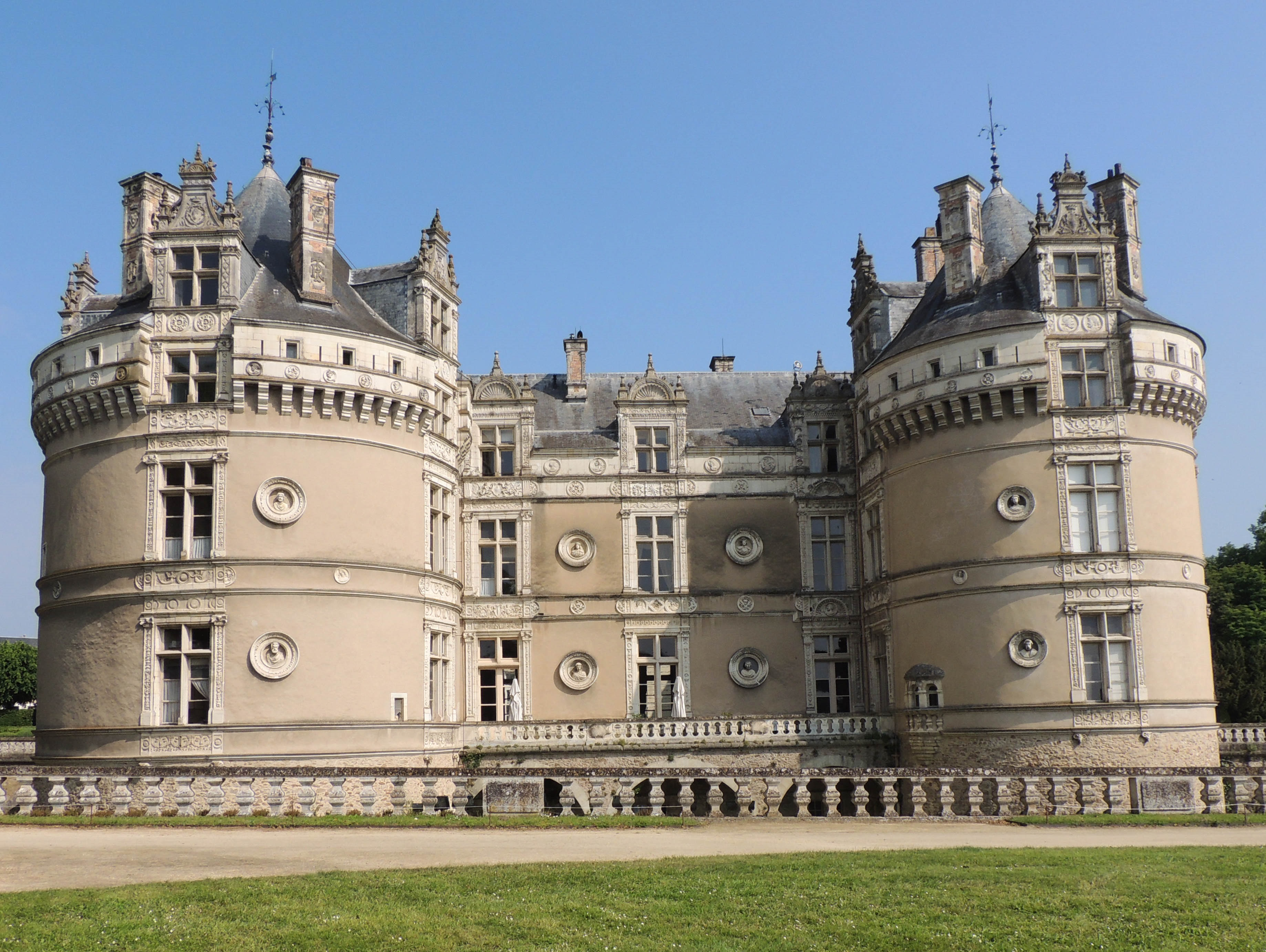
The Renaissance facade of the castle, designed by architect Jean Gendrot.

The castle of Le Lude experienced a period of prosperity during the Renaissance. In 1457, Jean Daillon, a childhood friend and chamberlain of King Louis XI of France, acquired the castle. Restored to favor by the king in 1468, Daillon decided to rebuild the castle from the ruin caused by the Hundred Years' War. He called upon Jean Gendrot, the architect of King René of Anjou, to assess the damage and determine the restoration work to be undertaken. In 1479, Jean Gendrot arrived at Le Lude and oversaw the work, which lasted nearly half a century. The old medieval fortress was entirely transformed into a pleasure residence, while still retaining its military aspect. During his stay at Le Lude, Jean Gendrot settled in a house near the castle, which is now called the "House of the Architects". The numerous workers engaged in the castle reconstruction were provided with accommodation in specially constructed housing units, such as the "House of the Foremen", situated close to the construction site. Additionally, the street known as the "Rue de la Gendrottière" derives its name directly from that of the architect, Jean Gendrot.

The Daillon family, who held the land of Le Lude for two centuries, occupied high positions in court. In May 1545, François I elevated the seigneury of Le Lude to the status of a county and, in 1675, Henry de Daillon, lieutenant-general of the king's armies, was granted the duchy-peerage. During this period, Le Lude received two royal visits. In 1598, Henry IV attended his first procession since his conversion to Catholicism on the occasion of Corpus Christi in the Church of Saint Vincent. His son and successor, Louis XIII, stayed at Le Lude Castle in 1619.

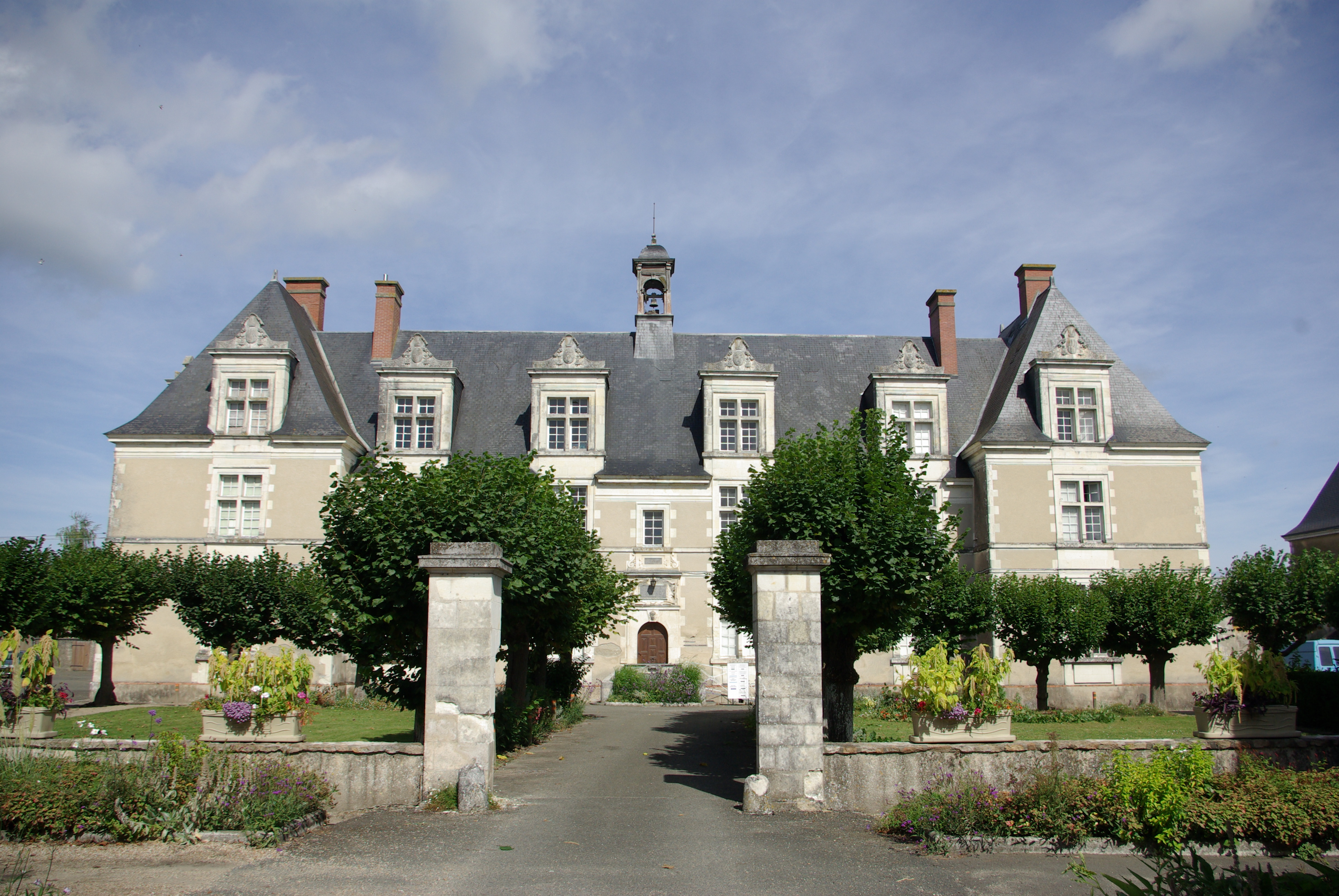
The hospital founded by René de la Crochinière.

In 1606, François de Daillon, Count of Le Lude, established a hospital for the ailing under the patronage of Saint Anne. Another hospital, known as Sainte-Catherine, was founded in the mid-17th century to serve as a retirement home. In the early 18th century, on January 27, 1705, René-François Fontaine de la Crochinière established the Notre-Dame de la Miséricorde Hospital, which was intended to provide care for orphaned girls. An ecclesiastic from a noble family of Le Lude, he acquired buildings located at the city gates, previously occupied by a community of Clarisse nuns. These buildings were subsequently incorporated into the grounds of the hospital, which was established by a prefectural decree on July 7, 1805, and which eventually merged the three hospitals of Le Lude into a single institution.

On April 16, 1640, Timoléon de Daillon, the lord of Le Lude, transferred ownership of a house situated on the outskirts of the town (Note: This is the 15th most prominent establishment on Rue de la Boule-d'Or.) to the Recollect monks, to establish a convent there.

The town's economic development gained new momentum in the 17th century with the establishment of several dyeing and tanning factories. Le Lude rapidly acquired a reputation for the production of leather and serge cloth. The tanners of Le Lude played a significant role in the development of the fair in the hamlet of Raillon, where trade in hides with merchants from across Western France was conducted. During the reigns of Louis XIV and Louis XV, the serge cloaks of Le Lude were highly sought after at the court. In 1730, a weekly market was established on Champ-de-Foire square, held every Thursday.

In the final decades of the 18th century, the Marquise de la Vieuville, the heir to the castle, undertook a series of substantial modifications to the residence, including the construction of the northeast facade, which faces the spur and the Loir, in a neoclassical style. After the Ancien Régime, Le Lude was part of the Angevin seneschal of Baugé and had its court, or "salt granary".

== Revolution and empire ==
In 1790, during the formation of the French departments, Le Lude, along with seventeen other parishes from the former province of Anjou, was incorporated into the Sarthe department. Subsequently, the commune became the seat of a canton. On October 10, 1790, the Department Directory issued an order transferring the annual fair from the hamlet of Raillon to the newly constructed Place du Mail in Le Lude. This site was previously occupied by the town's old cemetery. The sale of several religious buildings as national assets enabled the municipality, the National Guard, and the gendarmerie to progressively establish their headquarters in the former convent of the Recollects. On August 13, 1810, the neighboring commune of Saint-Mars-de-Cré was annexed by decree to that of Le Lude.

The year 1793 saw the commencement of the Vendée insurrection in response to the mass conscription decreed by the Convention. On March 18, the 60 men of the National Guard of Le Lude, under the command of the notary Lépingleux, were mobilized. The men subsequently joined the companies of La Flèche and Baugé, and on the following day, they reached the city of Saumur, where they confronted the insurgents. The Battle of Chemillé, which took place on April 11, resulted in the deaths of several guards from Le Lude. Le Lude was temporarily threatened during the Virée de Galerne. On December 10, 1793, while the insurgents had occupied La Flèche for three days, members of the municipal council of Le Lude sought refuge in Coulongé. As the Vendéens, having been defeated at Le Mans a few days prior, retreated towards the Loire, the representative on mission Garnier de Saintes ordered several companies of National Guards, including those from Châteaudun, Château-du-Loir, and Vendôme, to guard the bridge at Le Lude to prevent the insurgents from crossing. Despite the annihilation of the Catholic and Royal Army, disturbances persisted. Groups of Chouans continued to incite unrest in the region, resulting in occasional clashes. One such incident occurred on February 1, 1795, near the domain of Cherbon, situated to the north of the commune.

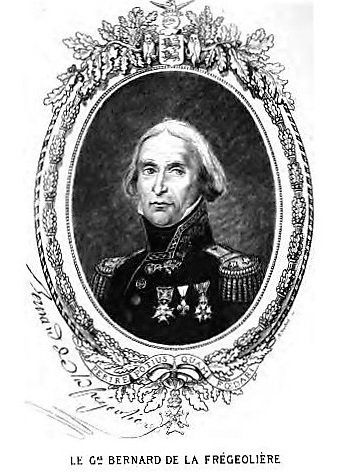
Henri-René Bernard de la Frégeolière's royalist troops take Le Lude twice.

In the context of the Third War in the Vendée (1799-1800), Henri-René Bernard de la Frégeolière, who held the rank of colonel in the 13th legion of the Maine Army of the Count of Bourmont, played a pivotal role in the capture of the town of Le Lude. This occurred shortly before the capture of Le Mans. Subsequently, he established his cantonment there, while the Chouans under his command engaged in several battles against the Republicans. One such battle was in the village of Foulletourte, where they drove out the 30th demi-brigade in January 1800. After the signing of the peace treaty by Count Bourmont at the beginning of February, Bernard de la Frégeolière maintained his troops in Le Lude for some time. However, he ultimately disbanded them following the arrest of Louis de Frotté in Normandy.

In 1813, Bernard de la Frégeolière clandestinely organized two companies of one hundred men each between Sarthe and Maine-et-Loire, under the name of "Nouveaux-Nés", to gather draft dodgers and hinder tax collection. At this time, the hope of a return to the monarchy was at its highest among the supporters of the monarchy. In response to these troop movements, the sub-prefect of La Flèche directed the National Guard to pursue the insurgents. The following year, the return of Napoleon I during the Hundred Days marked the beginning of a new uprising in western France, known as the "Petite Chouannerie". General of Andigné, commanding the royal army on the right bank of the Loire, organized the various commands. The arrondissement of La Flèche was the site of numerous clashes. On June 9, the royalist troops, led by General of Ambrugeac and Bernard de la Frégeolière, captured the town of Le Lude.

The Restoration did not bring an end to the region's troubles. In 1816, a few months after Napoleon I's second abdication, a small group of laborers, millers, and small landowners from the Le Lude region called for a revolt against the royal power. Calling themselves the "Vultures of Bonaparte", they seized weapons from nearby farmers to attack the local authorities. One of the members of this group, which numbered fewer than 20 individuals, had conceived the project of forming a free corps against the Prussians the previous year. Ultimately apprehended, the "Vultures of Bonaparte" were subjected to severe penalties by the Sarthe Provost Court. Four of them were executed by guillotine in Le Lude on the following day, while the remaining ten were imprisoned. (Note: Bellanger 1988, p. 102)

== Le Lude from the 19th century to the Interwar ==
=== Development and modernization of the town ===
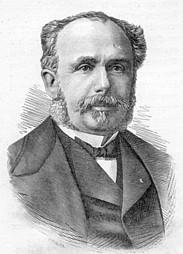
Count Auguste de Talhouët-Roy.

After the Revolution, the Talhouët family acquired Le Lude Castle. Later, members of the family held prominent political positions, with Frédéric de Talhouët becoming president of the General Council of Sarthe and his son, Auguste de Talhouët-Roy, serving as deputy and senator for Sarthe. In 1870, he was appointed Minister of Public Works and initiated a significant restoration project for the castle. His grandson, René de Talhouët-Roy, served as mayor of the town from 1888 to 1945 and concurrently as a member of the Sarthe General Council from 1898 to 1904.

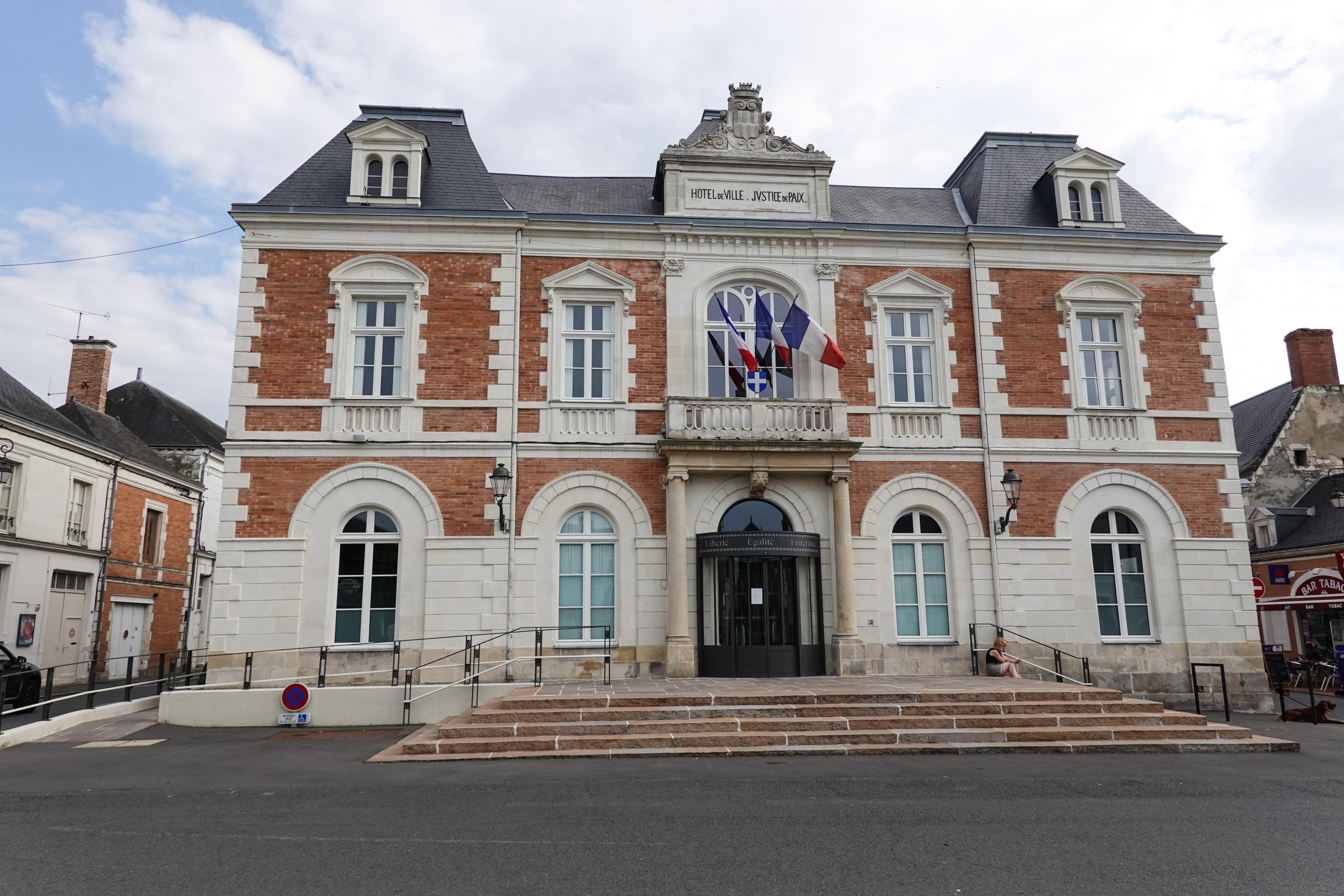
The town hall was built in the second half of the 19th century.

During the nineteenth century, Le Lude underwent a significant modernization process. The town hall, initially situated within the current premises of the Sainte-Anne school, was subsequently rebuilt in the center of the town by the designs of architect Pierre-Félix Delarue between 1857 and 1863. In 1868, the bridge over the Loir River was reconstructed in stone. In 1871, the railway reached Le Lude with the inauguration of the line connecting La Flèche to Aubigné-Racan. (Note: Bellanger 1988, p. 107) During this period, the decline in navigation on the Loir was gradual, yet the river continued to contribute to the town's economic development. In addition, several paper mills were established in the vicinity, including the Courbe paper mill in Le Lude in 1849. A community of workers rapidly developed around the mill, and by the early 20th century, a school was established in the vicinity. (Note: Bellanger 1988, pp. 103–105) The Malidor mill, which had previously been used for the production of flour and the tanning of animal hides until 1893, was subsequently converted into a hydroelectric power plant, thereby supplying the town with electricity. The initial efforts to establish a potable water supply system commenced in 1933. In 1933, the inauguration of the music pavilion on Champ-de-Foire square marked the beginning of several enhancement projects. In the same year, the Paul Doumer Boulevard, which provides access to the town from Tours, was inaugurated. The 1930s also saw the development of bus services providing daily connections to Le Mans, Tours, and Saumur, which began to compete with the railway. Industry concentrated along the Loir River, particularly in the bridge district, where the Joly tannery, Coiffard dairy, a boat-making workshop, and a laundry boat were located. Meanwhile, outside the town, the activity of the Courbe paper mill declined.

In 1910, the restaurant-dancing venue at Luna Park, located at Vaunaval, became one of the city's most significant entertainment destinations. The establishment was situated within a former starch factory and enjoyed considerable success during the interwar, remaining a popular venue until 1934. (Note: Bellanger 2000, p. 111) Following this, recreational activities were relocated to the Malidor site. In 1935, the Ludois Nautical Club constructed a swimming area on the Loir River, and two years later, a racecourse was built.

=== World War I ===
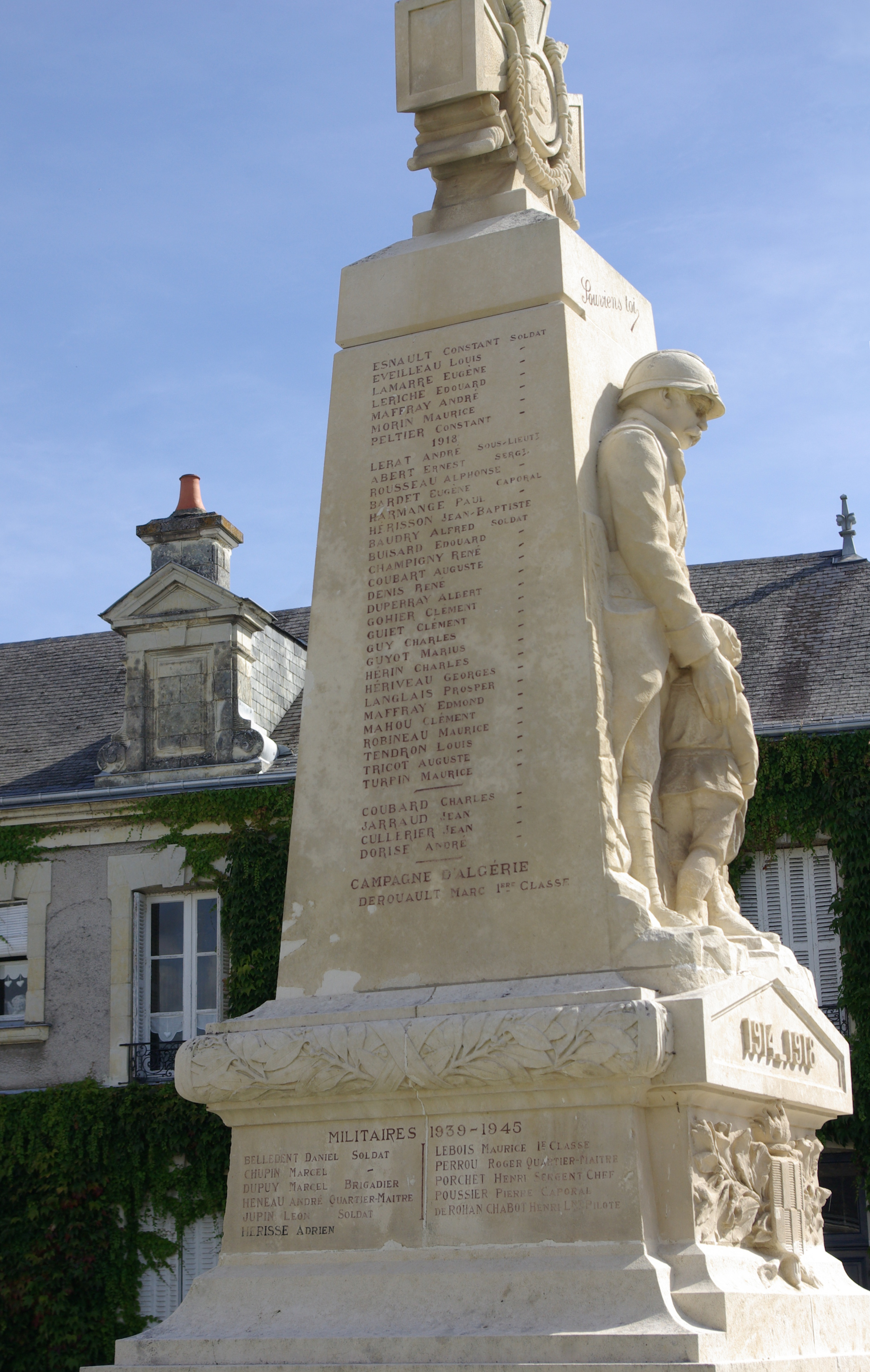
The war memorial pays tribute to the 123 Ludois who died between 1914 and 1918.

During the First World War, the town of Le Lude provided shelter to approximately sixty Belgian and French refugees from the front regions. Additionally, the town's hospital provided care for recuperating wounded military personnel. In 1916, young recruits from the 117th Infantry Regiment were stationed in Le Lude, followed the next year by a detachment of 700 men from the 150th Infantry Regiment. By the end of 1917, American troops had been stationed at Luna Park for several weeks, occupying the football field in particular. The conflict resulted in the deaths of 123 Ludois. As was the case with numerous other French communes, Le Lude erected a war memorial to honor the fallen after the war. The monument, created by sculptor Robert Gaullier, features an obelisk topped with a war cross and depicts a soldier with a child. It was inaugurated in the town square on October 23, 1921, in the presence of various dignitaries, including High Commissioner of the Ministry of War Henry Paté, General Vuillemot, Cardinal Dubois, and Prefect Alfred Stecke.

== The "Dark Years" (1939-1945) ==
=== German occupation during World War II ===
In the wake of the declaration of war on September 1, 1939, over 200 Ludois were mobilized. On September 8, evacuees from Paris's 19th arrondissement, primarily women and children, arrived at Le Lude's train station and were distributed among different communes. Le Lude provided shelter to 376 adults and 252 children displaced by the conflict. The number of evacuees increased over the following months, but by the end of 1939, two-thirds had returned to Paris. Meanwhile, on September 20, approximately one hundred British military personnel were stationed in Le Lude. The command post was established in the Hôtel du Bon Laboureur, while the troops were billeted in a structure adjacent to Malidor. The British military also initiated the construction of a provisional airfield to the south of the town, requisitioning agricultural land and demolishing buildings on the Bel-Air farm. However, the project was terminated in April 1940 due to the accelerated advancement of German forces. The landowners were compensated the following year.

In mid-May, the town hall established a reception center for Belgian and Ardennes refugees fleeing combat zones. Initially situated on the ground floor of the town hall and subsequently in the Hôtel du Bon Laboureur, the center could not accommodate the influx of refugees, who were occasionally housed in nearby farm barns and sheds. On June 19, 1940, the German army occupied the town. The German military requisitioned housing in the town center, at residents' homes, municipal buildings, and the castle. The commandant's office was initially established at 13 Rue de la Boule-d'Or and later relocated in September 1942 to 47 Boulevard Fisson. In contrast, 102 Ludois were detained in prisoner camps in Germany. In 1941, the Germans established a 35 km² perimeter of forests between Le Lude, Thorée-les-Pins, and Savigné-sous-le-Lude, named "Camp Moltke". Owned by the Marquis de Talhouët-Roy, these lands were used to store munitions, with nearly 800 bunkers camouflaged along forest paths. The command post was situated at the Domaine du Ruisseau in Thorée-les-Pins. (Note: Bellanger 2001, pp. 104–106)

On October 9, 1942, the five members of the Feuerman family, Jewish refugees from Paris, were arrested by the Gestapo and deported to Auschwitz and Ravensbrück, where they perished. In contrast, several Jewish children were successfully hidden by townspeople. Later, two women, Marie-Louise Déré and her daughter Andrée Chéramy-Déré, were acknowledged as Righteous Among the Nations by Yad Vashem in 1996.

On February 16, 1943, approximately 200 young people were summoned to the town hall for registration under the recently enacted law establishing compulsory work service. As the registration concluded at noon, a group of these young people, accompanied by other residents, (Note: In a report prepared three days later, the gendarmerie stated that a parade had been observed, which they estimated to have involved approximately two hundred individuals.) initiated a procession to the war memorial. After laying a wreath, they raised the French flag and performed a rendition of La Marseillaise accompanied by a bugle. The procession then proceeded to march through the streets, targeting the shop of a grocer who was accused of collaborating with the Germans. The demonstration ultimately concluded following intervention by the police and the deputy prefect of La Flèche. The following day, several demonstrators were arrested. (Note: Bellanger 2001, pp. 118–123) Thirteen young people from Le Lude and Thorée-les-Pins were deported to concentration camps, where six perished. Meanwhile, the intensity of resistance activities increased, with several networks operating in the Ludois region. One such network was the Max-Butler network, founded by Jean Bouguennec. (Note: Bellanger 2001, pp. 134–151)

On March 3, 1944, at a late hour in the morning, an act of sabotage perpetrated by local resistance fighters resulted in the detonation of a German munitions train at Le Lude station. The explosion killed two Ludois and caused extensive damage to nearby buildings and homes, with some structures being destroyed. (Note: Bellanger 2001, pp. 151–167)

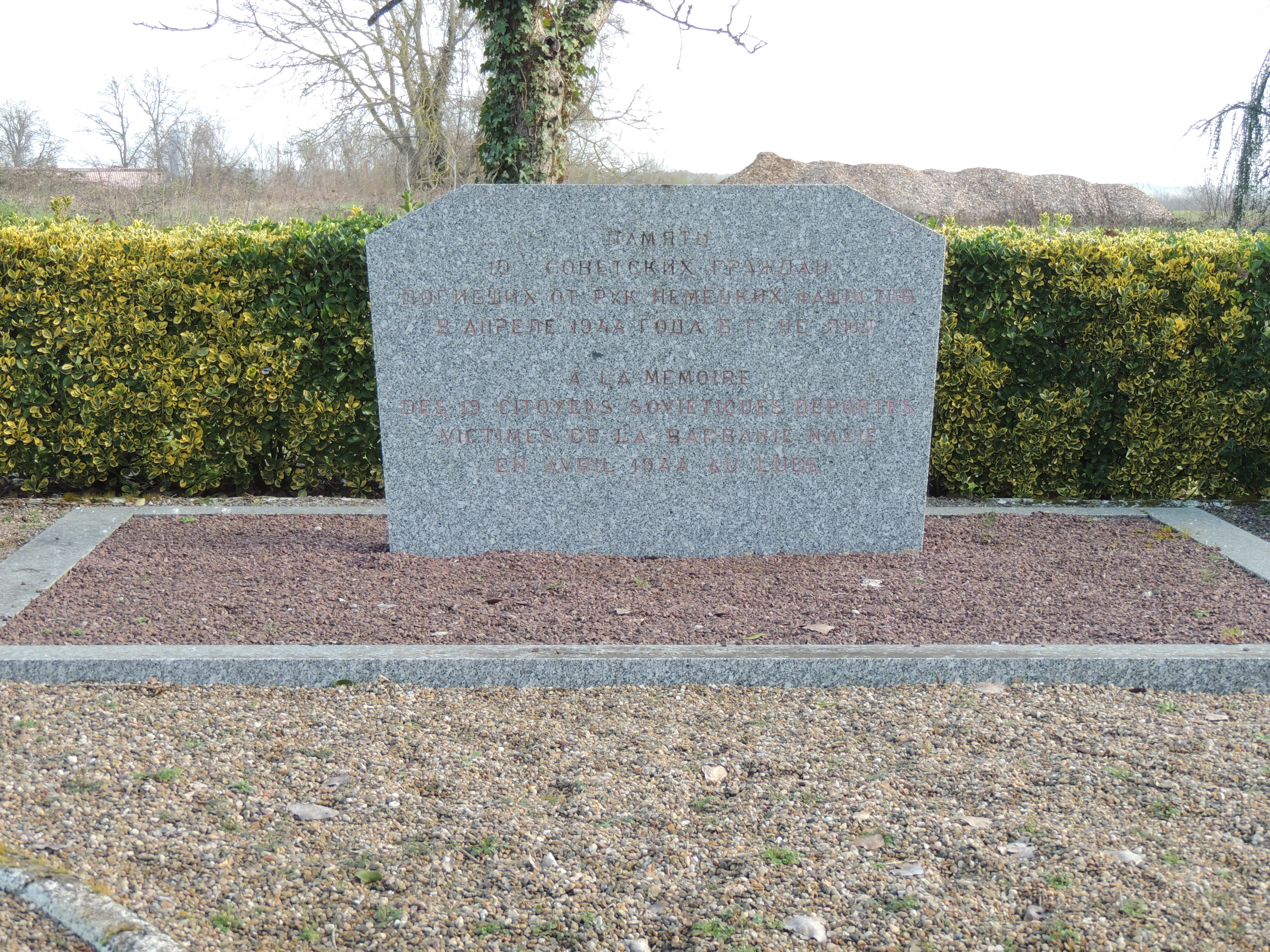
A stele pays tribute to the 19 Russian prisoners who died in detention at Le Lude.

On April 7, 1944, Russian prisoners were transported to Le Lude in buses from STAO requisitioned for the occasion. The German troops placed them in the vacant buildings of the Paul Marétheu shoe factory, situated by the Ris-Oui stream on the road to La Flèche. (Note: This is the current Vetra factory.) In total, over 500 prisoners were housed there in very harsh conditions, where food was scarce, and they were forced into labor. The women were assigned to excavate tuffeau in the mushroom caves of Luché-Pringé, situated opposite the Pilier farm, to store munitions and housing V1 missile assembly lines. In the meantime, they were engaged in the repair of the departmental road from Port des Roches to the mushroom caves, a 2.5-kilometer section that had been damaged by the passage of trucks transporting materials. Similarly, the road between Luché station and Mervé Castle, where the German officers of the Todt Organization resided, was restored. During their detention, 19 Russians perished. They were interred on a plot of land situated opposite the factory, between the road to La Flèche and the railway line.

=== Liberation ===
Following the Allied landing in Normandy on June 6, 1944, a resistance group emerged in the woods surrounding the Amenon castle. They engaged in combat with German soldiers on several occasions. (Note: Bellanger 2001, pp. 177–178) On August 2 and 7, Camp Moltke was subjected to aerial bombardment by the Allies, resulting in minimal damage due to the isolated storage bunkers. Three nearby residents were killed in these attacks. (Note: Bellanger 2001, pp. 178–181) The camp was ultimately mined and destroyed by the Germans as they commenced their withdrawal from the Ludois region on August 8. Some Russian prisoners managed to evade capture, but the majority were transferred by the Germans to an undisclosed location. The following day, members of the French Forces of the Interior assumed control of the town and apprehended 80 German soldiers at the hamlet of Raillon. Despite the Allied advance, Wehrmacht units were still reported to be in retreat around Le Lude in the following days. (Note: Bellanger 2001, pp. 184–186) However, the town was finally liberated by American troops on the morning of August 12. (Note: Bellanger 2001, pp. 189–190)

In response to the August 23 decree requiring resistance fighters to sign up for the duration of the war, several Ludois resistance members joined the 1st FFI Regiment. On August 28, the 4th Company of this battalion was garrisoned in the La Chaussée factory for a brief ten-day military training period. On September 10, they joined other volunteers in Le Mans to form the 1st Company of the 8th FFI Battalion, (Note: Bellanger 2001, pp. 195–196) which fought in the Saint-Nazaire pocket until the German forces surrendered on May 11, 1945.

Meanwhile, the La Chaussée factory was utilized by the American military as a barracks and prison facility. (Note: Bellanger 2001, p. 197)

== From post-war to the 21st century ==
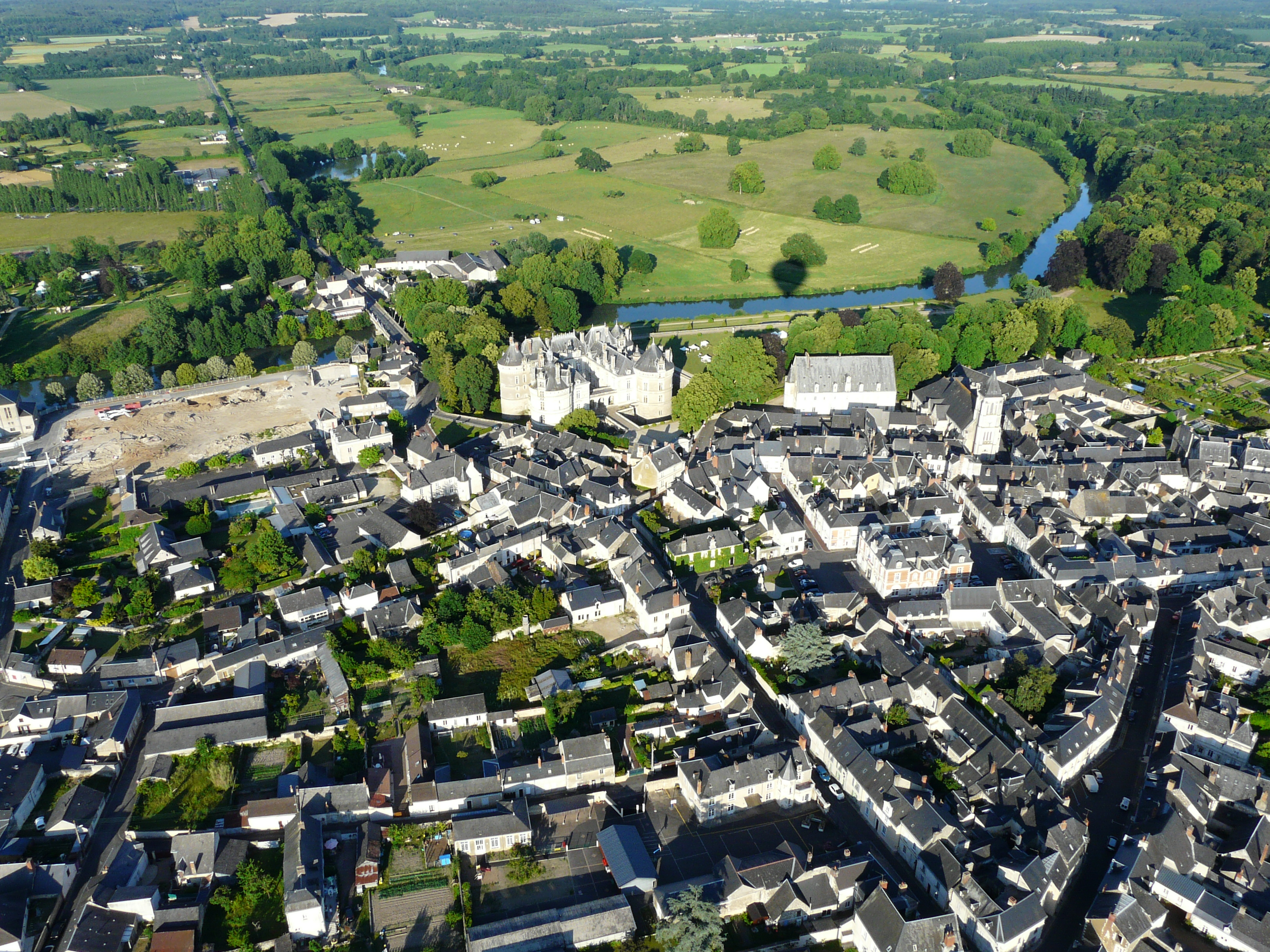
The site of the former Candia factory, to the left of the château, is to make way for a police station.

In the months following the liberation of the town, economic activity resumed. To address the labor shortage resulting from the continued captivity of numerous French soldiers in Germany, local farmers recruited approximately thirty German prisoners from the Thorée-les-Pins military camp for agricultural labor. On October 3, 1945, eleven of them were also engaged in the construction of the new municipal stadium at the end of Chemin de la Cave-au-Coq, which was inaugurated three years later. (Note: Bellanger 2001, pp. 214–215) While the economy developed, railway transport declined rapidly. The last passenger train arrived at Le Lude station in June 1949.

On December 29, 1955, a violent storm struck western France. The bell tower of Saint-Vincent Church was destroyed and not rebuilt identically, lacking its spire. In 1949, the bodies of the 19 Russian prisoners who died during their detention were exhumed and transferred to the town cemetery. In 1985, two steles were erected in their honor: one in the cemetery and the other near the factory entrance where they were held. The latter was inaugurated in the presence of the Soviet consul.

In the latter half of the 20th century, the town gained a certain degree of renown as a result of some notable events. Le Lude stands out for having hosted the European Jeep-Cross Championship in 1953 and 1954. (Note: Bellanger 2000, p. 125) However, it was primarily the presence of its castle that brought fame to the town. In 1958, Princess Pia-Maria of Orléans-Braganza, widow of Count René de Nicolaÿ, commissioned the creation of one of France's first sound and light shows at the château. The show ensured the building's and the town's fame until its final performance in 1995.

The most significant accomplishment of the late 20th century in Le Lude was the establishment of the Espace Ronsard in 1989. This complex encompasses a dining hall and a 440-seat theater, utilized for film screenings and cultural events.

Since the early 2000s, many ground collapses have occurred in Le Lude, resulting in one fatality in November 2008. These collapses are attributed to the numerous underground tuffeau stone extraction galleries, which have been utilized since the 16th century for the construction of residential buildings and the castle in Le Lude.

The early 21st century has been marked by a sharp decline in industrial and economic activity throughout southern Sarthe, and Le Lude has not been spared. In 2014, the Candia dairy's closure resulted in the loss of 185 jobs in the town. This closure was part of a series of other company shutdowns since the early 2000s. The site of the former dairy was completely demolished in 2019 and became the property of the Sud Sarthe community of communes to establish a new gendarmerie there.

== Bibliography ==
- Montzey, Charles (1977). Histoire de La Flèche et de ses seigneurs (in French). Vol. I–III. Le Mans, Paris: R. Pellechat-H. Champion. pp. 286, 356 & 377.
- Candé, Paul (1889). "Les seigneurs du Lude au temps de la féodalité". Revue historique et archéologique du Maine (in French). 26. Archived from the original on July 10, 2024.
- Candé, Paul (1950). Notice historique sur Le Lude et son château (in French) (2nd ed.). La Flèche: Besnier.
- Bellanger, Jacques (1988). À la recherche du Lude ancien (in French). Le Mans: Impr. MBI. ISBN 2-9507738-2-6.
- Bellanger, Jacques (2000). Le Lude et son canton. Mémoire en Images (in French). Alan Sutton. ISBN 2842534328.
- Bellanger, Jacques (2001). Le Lude des années sombres : 1939-1945 (in French). Fresnay-sur-Sarthe: Imprimerie fresnoise. ISBN 2-9513400-5-2.
- Bellanger, Jacques (2007). Chroniques du Lude : 1900-1920. Témoignages et récits (in French). Saint-Cyr-sur-Loire: Alan Sutton Eds. ISBN 978-2-8491068-4-6.
- David, Charles-Marie (2009). Le château du Lude : Essai historique sur son origine et ses possesseurs. Monographies des villes et villages (in French). Saint-Cyr-sur-Loire: Livre d'Histoire. ISBN 978-2-7586026-2-0.
- Yagil, Limore (2014). Le sauvetage des Juifs dans l'Indre-et-Loire (in French). Sarthe, Mayenne, Maine-et-Loire, Loire-Inférieure: Geste éditions.
- Yagil, Limore (2009). "Typologie du sauvetage des juifs dans la Sarthe 1940-1944". Guerres Mondiales et Conflits Contemporains (in French) (236): 97–119.
