= Albinus of Angers =

French abbot and bishop

Saint Albinus of Angers
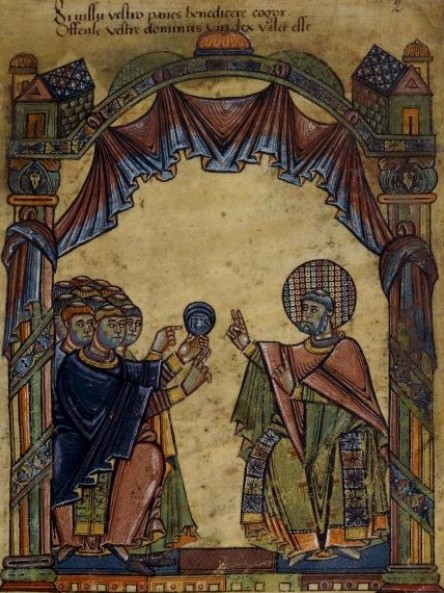
- Saint Albinus (Albin) at the Third Council of Orléans

Bishop
- Born: c. 470 AD; Vannes, Brittany
- Died: 550 AD; Angers, France
- Venerated in: Roman Catholic Church; Anglican Church
- Major shrine: fr:Abbaye Saint-Aubin d'Angers, Angers
- Feast: 1 March
- Patronage: invoked against pirate attacks

Saint Albinus of Angers (French: Saint-Aubin; c. 470 – 1 March 550), also known as Saint Albin (/ˈælbɪn/) in English, was a French abbot and bishop. Born to a noble Gallo-Roman family at Vannes, Brittany, St. Albinus was a monk and from 504 A.D. Abbot of Tintillac (Note: This no longer stands; its location has not been satisfactorily identified.) His reputation spread during the 25 years in which he served as abbot. In 529, St. Albinus was elected, against his wishes, Bishop of Angers.

== Episcopate ==
He campaigned against incestuous weddings, such as those that occurred between members of the nobility. He participated in the Third Council of Orléans (538) after King Childebert granted permission for this council to take place. Albinus sought advice from St. Caesarius of Arles after seeing laxity in other bishops.

Tradition states that he helped all in distress, using diocesan funds to free hostages from pirates. Another tradition states that he clashed with King Childebert, who had imprisoned a woman called Etherie, from Douille near Angers. Unable to secure her release, Albinus visited her in prison and the soldier who tried to resist him fell dead at his feet. This so impressed the king that he allowed St. Albinus to bail her out.

Another legend relates that St. Albinus once prayed far into the night for some men imprisoned in the Tower of Angers. Suddenly a great stone collapsed from the wall, allowing their escape.

== Death and burial ==
St. Albinus died in 550 and was buried in the church of Saint-Pierre at Angers. In 556, a church was dedicated to him and his body was reburied in its crypt; near to this church, an abbey arose, called Saint-Aubin.

== Veneration ==
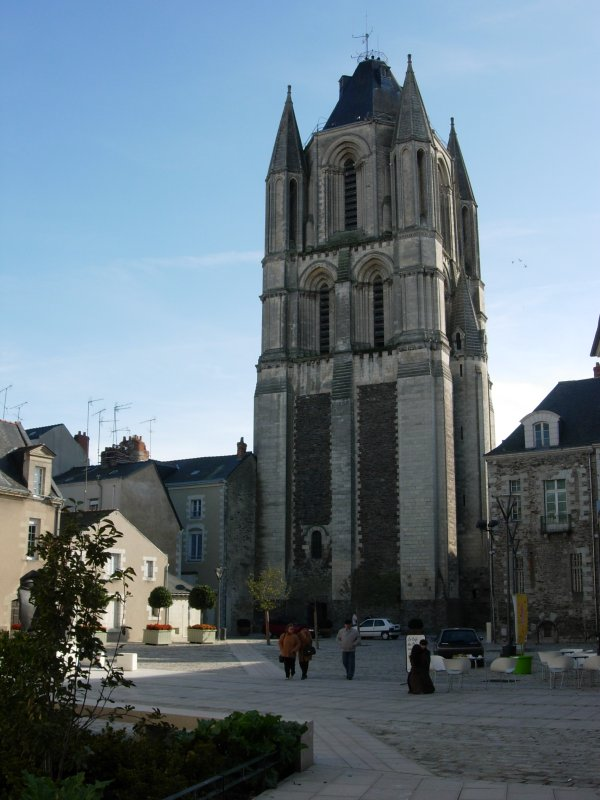
Saint-Aubin, Angers

St. Gregory of Tours remarks on the cult of St. Albinus, which later became diffused in Germany, England, and Poland, making St. Albinus a popular saint during the Middle Ages. St. Venantius Fortunatus, a near contemporary, wrote a life of this saint.

Churches were dedicated to him right across the continent as far as Poland, and he was sometimes seen as the patron saint for protection from pirate attack. This may have been based on the tradition that he bought back parishioners who had been taken captive by pirates sailing up the Loire river. Later the tradition was reinforced by a miracle recorded in the 10th century, when the walled town of Guérande, near the mouth of the Loire, prayed to St. Albinus for help and found their attackers miraculously defeated.

In the Middle Ages, Nicholas Belfort notably wrote describing miracles performed at the tomb of St. Aubin after the year 1000 AD. Belfort was a Regular Canon in the monastery of St John the Baptist by the city of Soissons.

Thus, his fame increased and many coastal villages chose Aubin as their patron saint; presumably this is the reason why St. Aubin in Jersey bears his name, preserving the name of an ancient chapel that has long since disappeared. St. Aubin is venerated there in the Anglican church of St Aubin on the Hill. (Note: See Saint-Aubin article for other places named after him.)

St. Albinus' feast day is celebrated annually on 1 March. St. Albinus is the name of a song written by Henry Gauntlett to the hymn "Jesus lives! Thy terrors now" by Christian Furchtegott Gellert 1715-1769 (New English Hymnal #112).

== See also ==
- Abbey of Saint-Aubin
