= Abbey of Saint-Aubin =

Abbey in Angers, France

Coordinates: 47.4687°N 0.5533°W

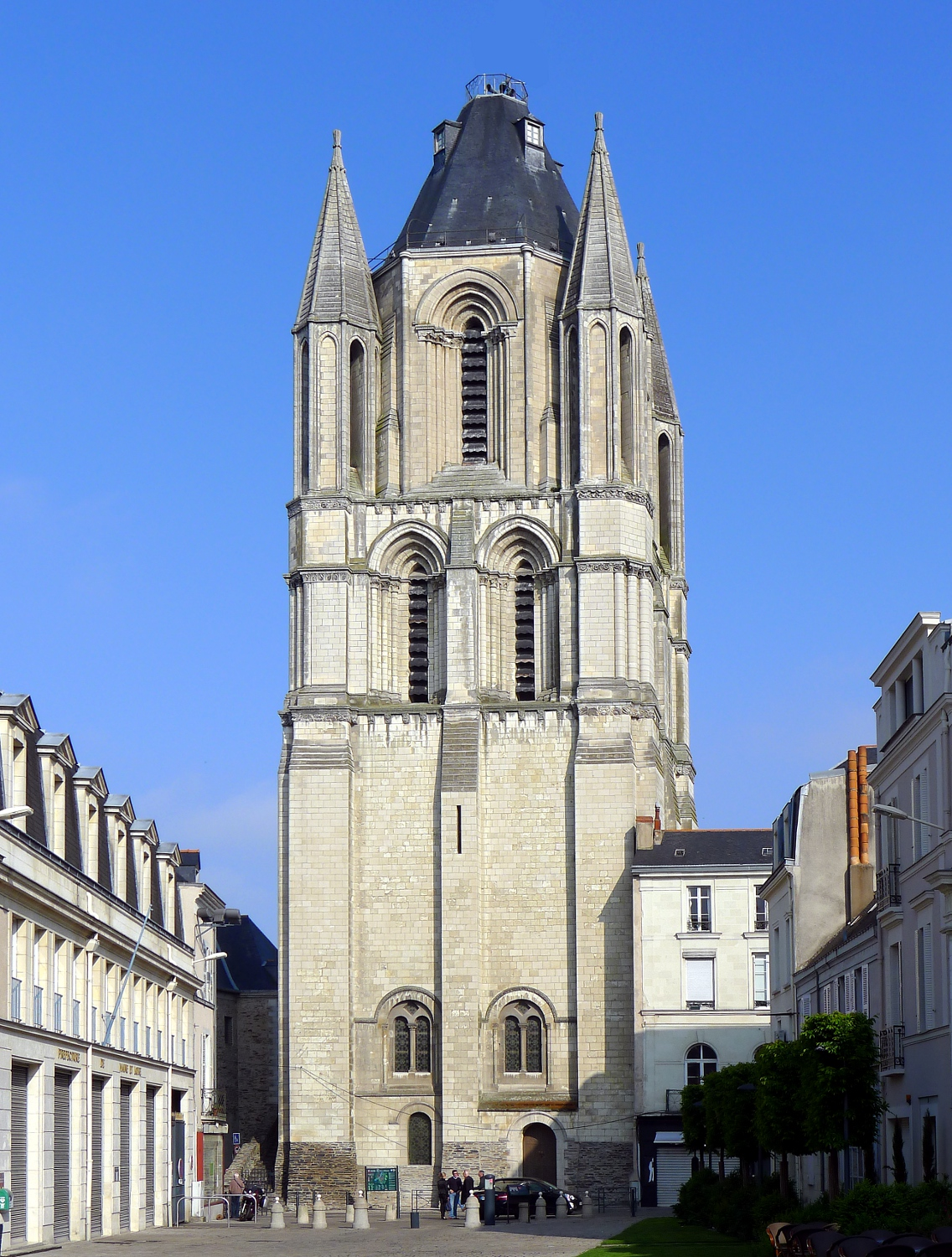

Religion
- Affiliation: Catholic church
- District: Angers
- Province: Maine-et-Loire
- Region: Pays de la Loire

Location
- Country: France
- Interactive map of Abbey of Saint-Aubin

Architecture
- Completed: 17th century

Saint-Aubin Abbey is a former abbey in Angers, founded in the 6th century and dispersed during the French Revolution.

== History ==
The abbey's origins date back to a funerary basilica (memoria) built to house the tomb of Bishop Albinus (529–550). Albinus had been buried in a cellula angusta pending completion of the great basilica, which took place between 550 and 576. The nova basilica was soon named after Saint Aubin, as Gregory of Tours mentions ("Dix Livres d'histoire", l. VI, 16).

The funerary basilica became a monastery around the 6th–7th centuries. In 616, Bishop Bertrand du Mans implied monastic activity: "venerabile Bobeno abbate de basilica sancti Albini", as did the author of the first Vita S. Magnobodi (9th or 10th century): "abbas vocabulo Niulphus qui coenobium". Excavations carried out in 1997 during the redevelopment of the Musée des Beaux-Arts (Logis Barrault) showed that around this period, the courtyard area of the building was empty of human habitation, and that a few burials were present; the occupation of this period is interpreted as already being the enclosure of the Abbey of Saint-Aubin.

A canonical community took the place of the monks in the 8th or 9th century. Bishop Théodulf d'Orléans, accused of supporting Bernard of Italy, was detained here from 818 until his death in 820.

Saint-Aubin definitively regained its abbey status with the return of the monks in 966 (Cartulaire de Saint-Aubin, no. 18), when the establishment was reformed. The monks were dispersed by the French Revolution.

The abbey church was demolished in 1811 to create what is now Place Michel-Debré, and the cloister was incorporated into the new Maine-et-Loire prefecture building. The fortified bell tower, separate from the abbey and formerly the abbot's own property, has been preserved (the "Tour Saint-Aubin", still visible on rue des Lices).

== The Tower Saint-Aubin ==
The bell tower of Saint-Aubin Abbey is not as old as the adjoining abbey. It was built in the 11th century. It rises 54 meters above the city of Angers. In the Middle Ages, the Saint-Aubin tower served as a watchtower. It formed a small fortress with loopholes and a well. Like other abbey towers of the same period, it was built outside the abbey itself.

With the ravages of time, successive occupations and multiple uses, the tower eventually fell into disrepair. During the 19th century, the belfry, campanile and roof were destroyed. It later became a shot tower for the manufacture of hunting shot.

In 1862, the Saint-Aubin tower was listed as a Monument Historique. Further protection through classification or inscription (classifications in 1901, 1904, 1968; inscription in 2007) completed this initial classification.

In the first half of the 20th century, it housed the Musée de l'Industrie, then a meteorological observatory. Today, it hosts temporary art exhibitions.

== The abbey's cloister ==
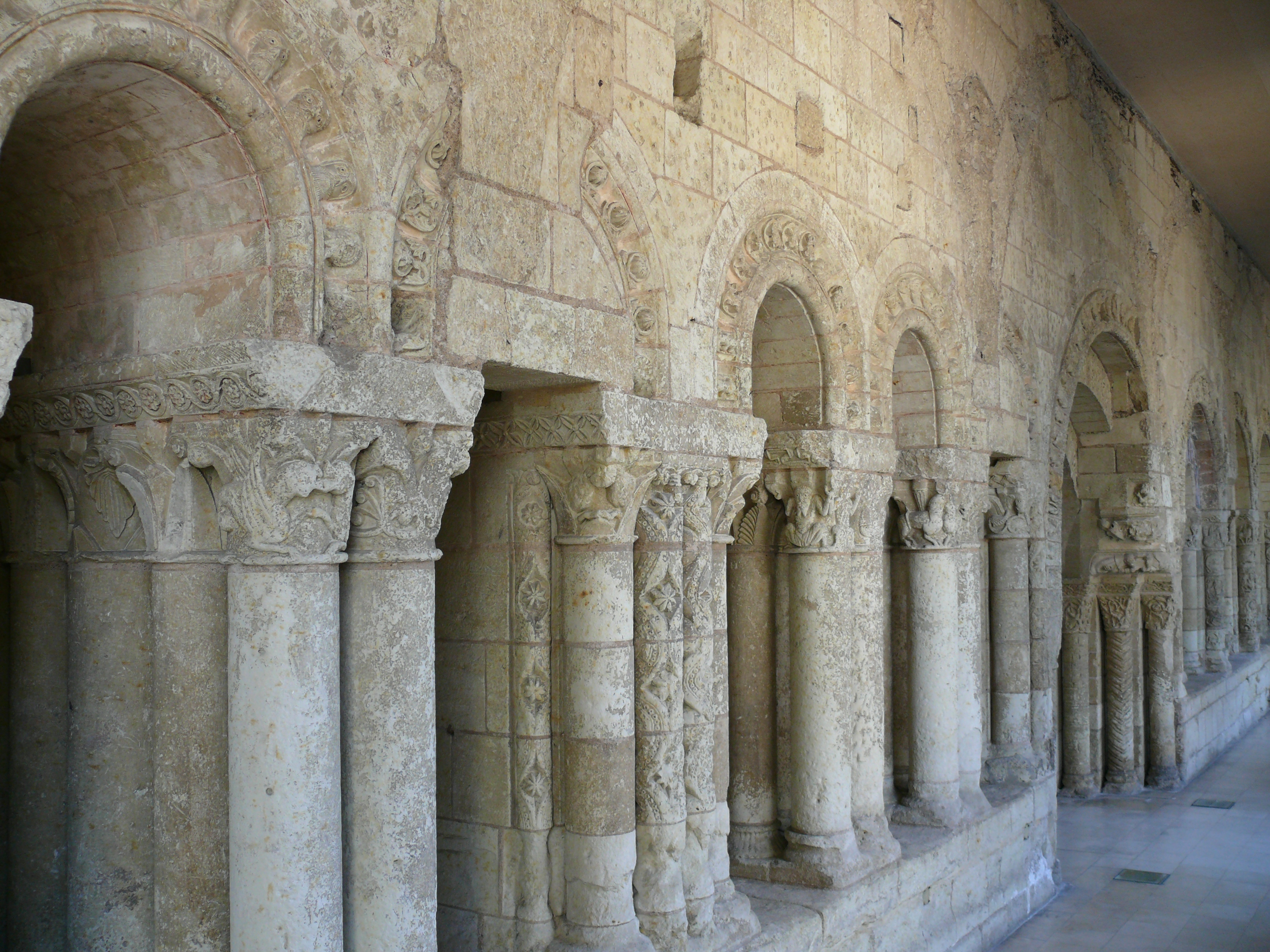
East gallery of the cloister

The abbey's Romanesque cloister stood on the site of today's Maine-et-Loire prefecture. It was built on the initiative of Robert de La Tour-Landry, abbot of Saint-Aubin from 1127 to 1154. All that remains is the eastern gallery with the Chapter house door and two series of arcades on either side. On the north side, they consist of two triplets of three arcades each. On the south side, they are composed of geminated bays beneath three framing arcades. These twelve arcades must have been built in the 12th century.

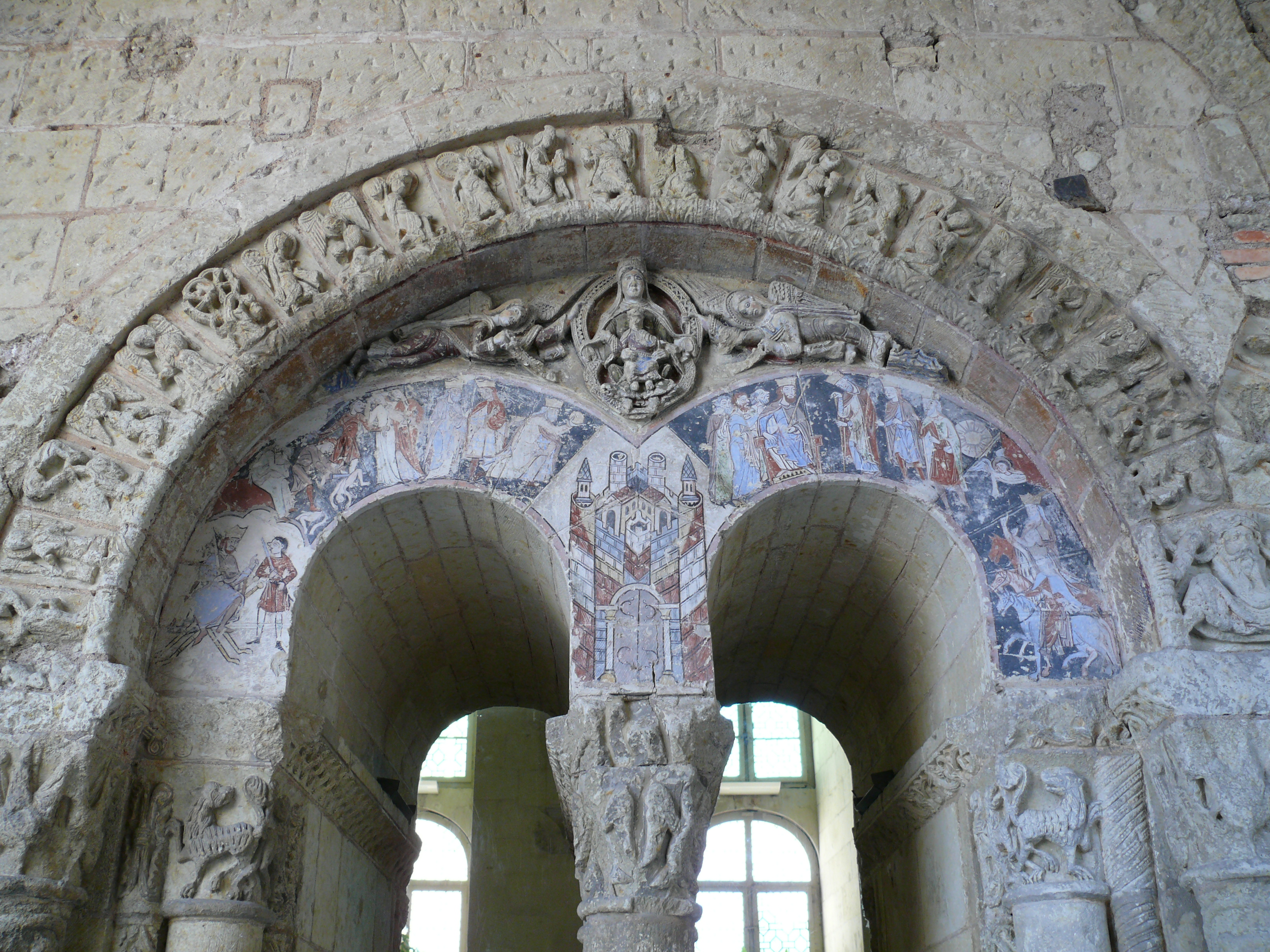
The Maestà and Romanesque paintings

The doorway to the chapter house features three archivolt scrolls. The capitals on the cloister side depict episodes from the story of Samson. Under the archivolts of the southern arcades, the spandrels depict scenes depicting the Maestà and the story of David and Goliath. Beneath the representation of the Maestà, surrounded by two angels, is a painting showing, on the right, the Magi showing the star and setting off towards Jerusalem, on the left, Herod ordering the Massacre of the Innocents, and in the center, Jerusalem symbolized by the representation of the Virgin.

The monks wanted to cover the cloister with a Gothic vault in the 14th century, but this work damaged the Romanesque sculptures. The abbey buildings were rebuilt between 1668 and 1692.

The surviving cloister arcades in the courtyard of the Angers prefecture and in a room on the first floor of the prefecture's central building were classified as Historic Monuments by decree on 19 July 1901.

== Bibliography ==
- Germain, Dom Michel. Matériaux du Monasticon Gallicanum, (in Latin).
- d'Herbécourt, Pierre; Porcher, Jean (1959). Anjou roman (1st ed.). La Pierre-qui-Vire. pp. 149–178.
- Deyres, Marcel; Porcher, Jean (1987). Anjou roman (2nd ed.). La Pierre-qui-Vire. pp. 207–217. ISBN 2-7369-0039-1.
- Comte, François; Siraudeau, Jean (1990). Documents d'évaluation du patrimoine archéologique des villes de France, « Angers ». Tours: Centre national d'archéologie urbaine.
- Comte, François (2003). Le Territoire d'Angers du dixième au treizième siècle: naissance des bourgs et faubourgs monastiques et canoniaux, in: (en) Anjou, Medieval Art, Architecture and Archaeology (Leeds ed.). The British Archaeological Association.
- Pietri, Luce (1987). Topographie chrétienne des cités de la Gaule. Paris: Bibliothèque de l'École des chartes. pp. 67–81.
