= Talhouët family =

Noble family

Coat of arms of the Talhouët family

The Talhouët family is a French noble family from the Duchy of Brittany, originating in the 15th century.

== Members ==
=== Marquises of Talhouët ===
- Louis Céleste de Talhouët-Bonamour (Rennes, 5 October 1761 - Paris Ier arrondissement, 5 March 1812), marquis of Talhouët and marquis of Acigné, lord of Québriac, lieutenant in the king's infantry (27 April 1788), marquis of Talhouët, count of the Empire, member and president of the electoral college of Sarthe.
- Auguste-Frédéric de Talhouët (1788-1842), marquis of Talhouët, maréchal de camp, peer of France.
- Auguste de Talhouët-Roy (1819-1884), marquis of Talhouët, deputy, senator, minister

=== Other members ===
- Françoise de Talhouët-Roy (1818–1863), who married Géraud de Crussol d'Uzès, 11th Duke of Uzès

== Sources ==
- "de talhouet". Base (in Breton). 16 October 2018.
