= Etamine =

Mesh fabric type

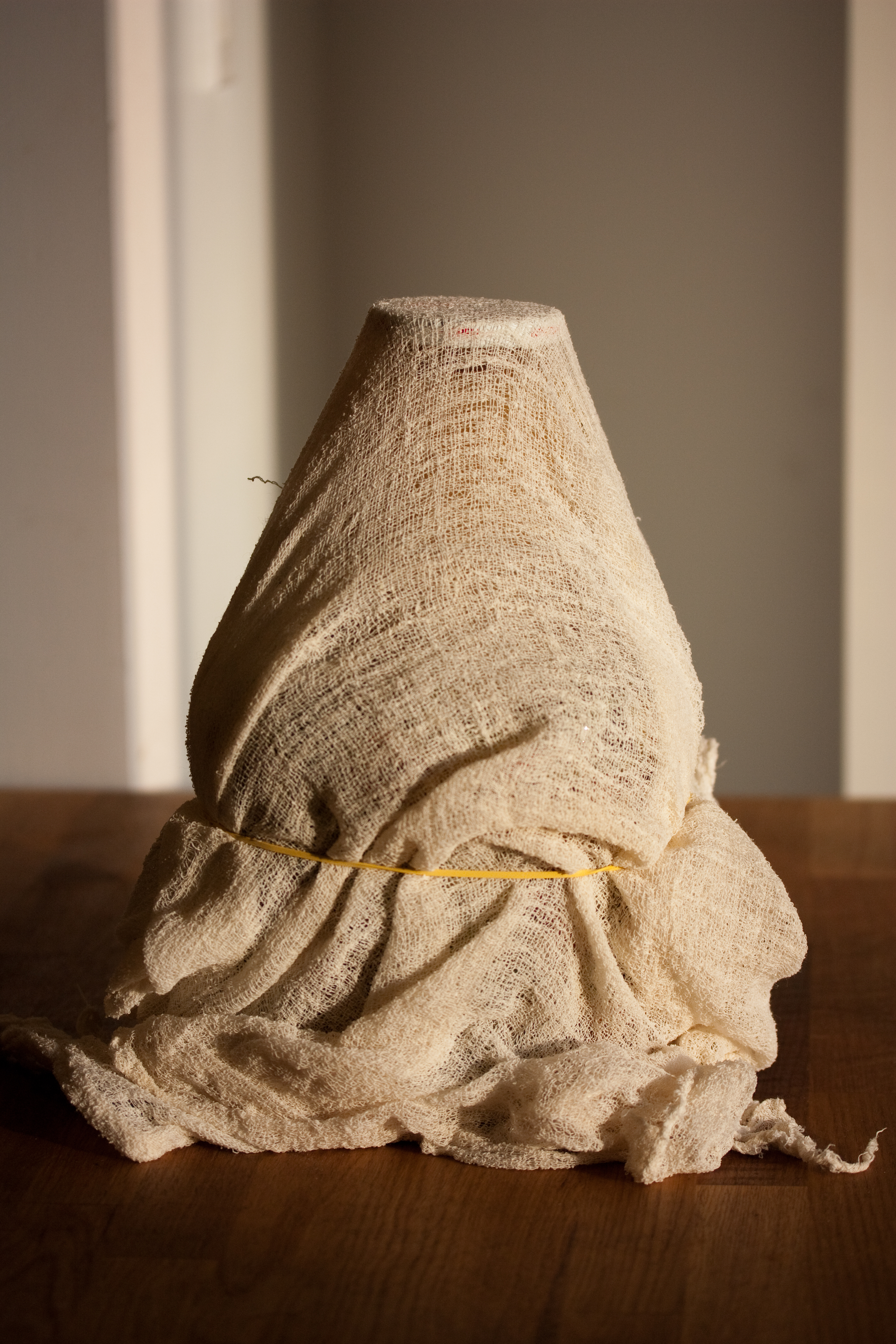

Etamine is a loosely woven fabric with a similar structure to voile or a mesh. It is an open fabric structure manufactured with plain weaving by using hardly twisted cotton or wool yarns. There were further variations including various fibres such as silk. Etamine was initially used as filter cloth, but became popular in women's skirts from 1910. Etamine was used in a variety of applications, including garments, nun's veils, and even flags.

== Etymology ==
The word étamine, which means sieve, is a borrowed word from French language. The kitchen tool of fabric mounted on a round frame is often referred to in English as the sound-alike "tammy" or "tami". The same tool can also be called a "drum-sieve" in other books about French cooking.

== See also ==
- Sheer fabric
