= Coulongé =

- Commune
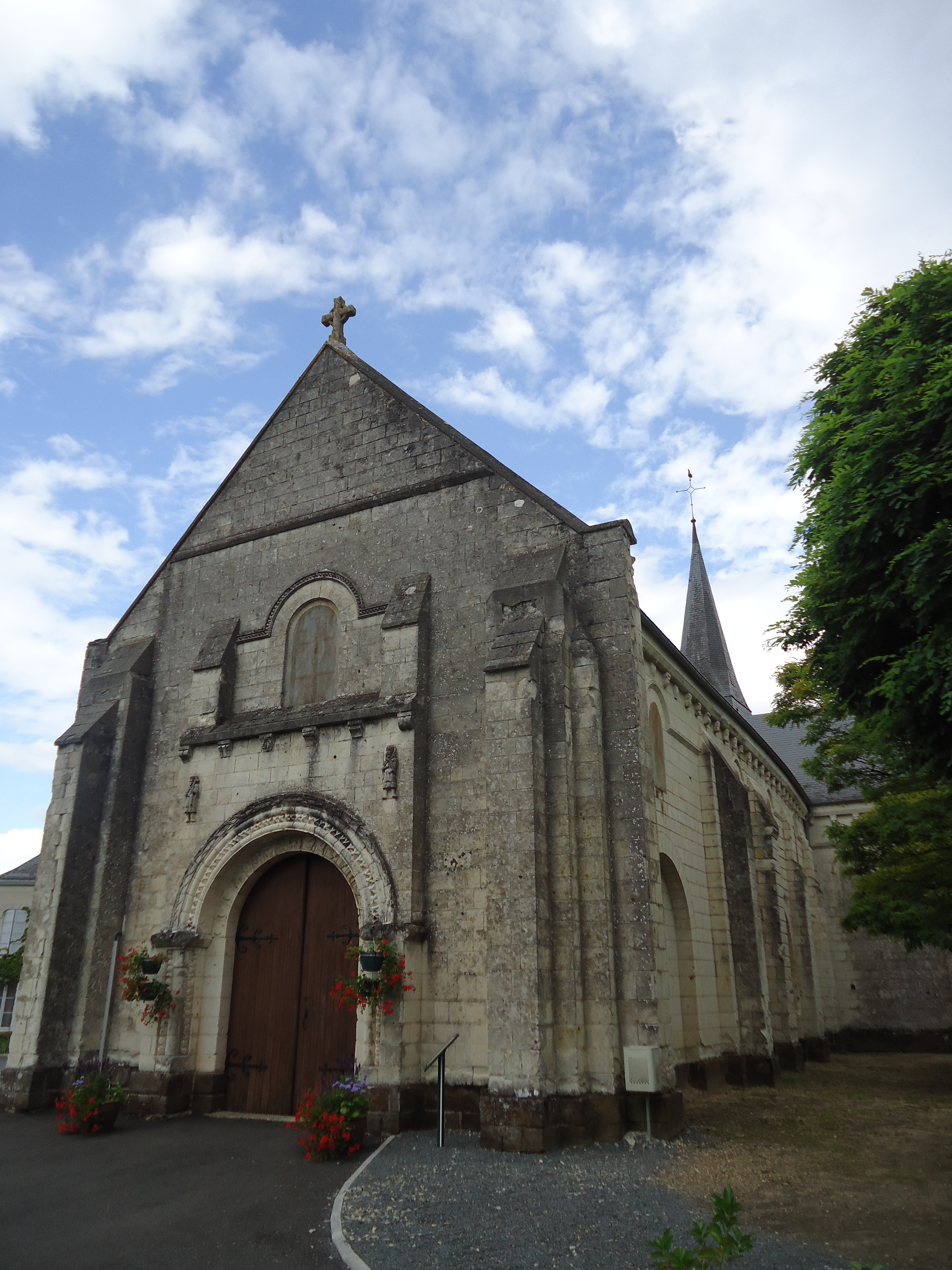
- The church of Saint Lubin

- Coat of arms
- Location of Coulongé
- Location within France Location within Pays de la Loire
- Coordinates: 47°41′28″N 0°12′01″E
- Country: France
- Region: Pays de la Loire
- Department: Sarthe
- Arrondissement: La Flèche
- Canton: Le Lude
- Intercommunality: Sud Sarthe

Government
  - Mayor (2020–2026): Yves Le Bouffant
- Area^{1}: 15.2 km^{2} (5.9 sq mi)
- Population (2023): 506
  - Density: 33.3/km^{2} (86.2/sq mi)
- Demonym(s): Coulongeois, Coulongeoise
- Time zone: UTC+01:00 (CET)
  - Summer (DST): UTC+02:00 (CEST)
- INSEE/Postal code: 72098 /72800
- ^{1} French Land Register data, which excludes lakes, ponds, glaciers > 1 km^{2} (0.386 sq mi or 247 acres) and river estuaries.

Coulongé (French pronunciation: [kulɔ̃ʒe]) is a commune in the Sarthe department in the Pays de la Loire region in north-western France.

== See also ==
- Communes of the Sarthe department
