= Aubigné-Racan =

- Commune
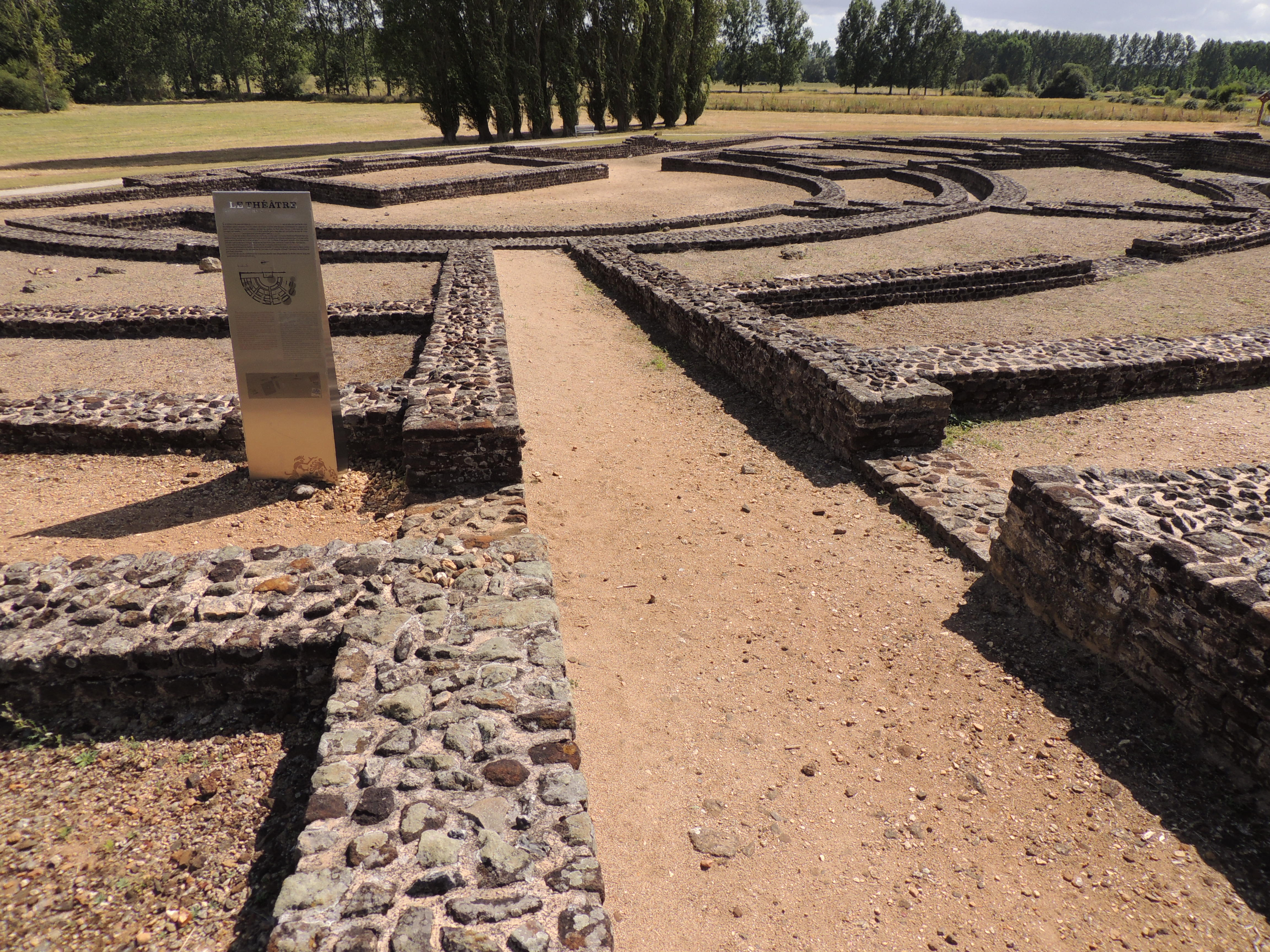
- The ruins of the theatre

- Coat of arms
- Location of Aubigné-Racan
- Location within France Location within Pays de la Loire
- Coordinates: 47°41′29″N 0°16′07″E
- Country: France
- Region: Pays de la Loire
- Department: Sarthe
- Arrondissement: La Flèche
- Canton: Le Lude
- Intercommunality: CC Sud Sarthe

Government
  - Mayor (2020–2026): Nicolas Mourier
- Area^{1}: 32.03 km^{2} (12.37 sq mi)
- Elevation: 31 m (102 ft)
- Highest elevation: 118 m (387 ft)
- Lowest elevation: 37 m (121 ft)
- Population (2023): 2,158
  - Density: 67.37/km^{2} (174.5/sq mi)
- Time zone: UTC+01:00 (CET)
  - Summer (DST): UTC+02:00 (CEST)
- INSEE/Postal code: 72013 /72800
- ^{1} French Land Register data, which excludes lakes, ponds, glaciers > 1 km^{2} (0.386 sq mi or 247 acres) and river estuaries.

Aubigné-Racan (French pronunciation: [obiɲe ʁakɑ̃]) is a commune in the Sarthe department in the region of Pays de la Loire in north-western France.

== Population ==
Historical population
Year	Pop.	±% p.a.
1968	1,858	—
1975	1,942	+0.63%
1982	1,923	−0.14%
1990	2,103	+1.12%
1999	2,100	−0.02%
2007	2,077	−0.14%
2012	2,144	+0.64%
2017	2,120	−0.22%
2023	2,158	+0.30%
Source: INSEE

== Sights ==
In the surrounding countryside, one can find prehistoric standing stones, or dolmens ("dolmen de la Pierre" and "dolmen du Colombier").

Aubigné-Racan is also the site of the archeological excavation of Cherré, a Gallo-Roman complex of 20 hectares from the 1st to the 3rd centuries. The site was likely a rural centre of commercial and religious activity before the Roman conquest. Excavations in 1977 by C. Lambert and J. Rioufreyt discovered an ancient theatre, two temples, Roman thermae, a forum and an aqueduct.

The town has a Romanesque church from the 11th century.

== People ==
Aubigné-Racan is the birthplace of the 17th century poet and dramatist Honorat de Bueil, seigneur de Racan. His birthplace, the Manoir de Champmarin, is still standing.

== See also ==
- Communes of the Sarthe department
