= Saint-Germain-d'Arcé =

- Commune
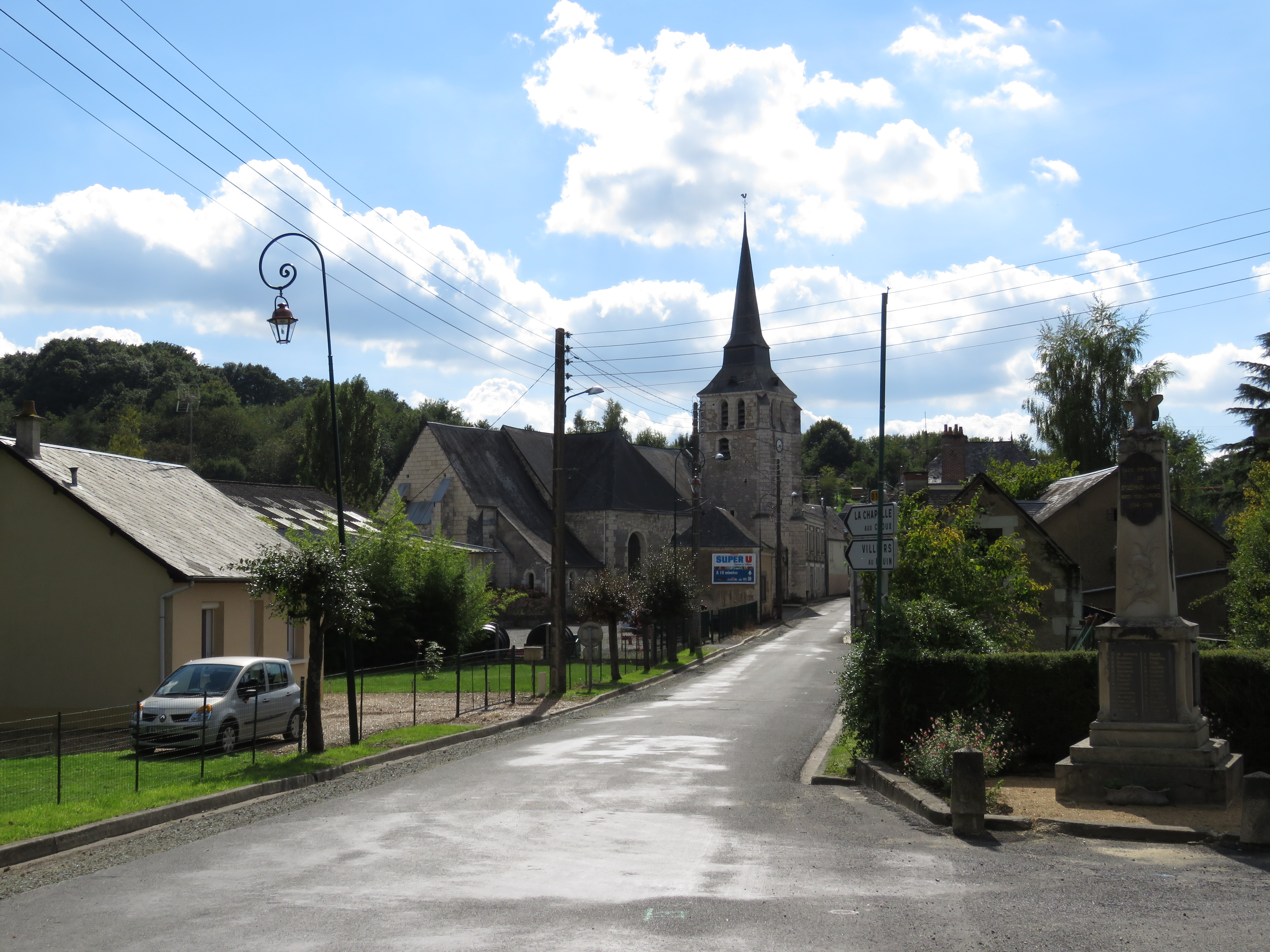
- The church of Saint-Germain-d'Arcé
- Location of Saint-Germain-d'Arcé
- Location within France Location within Pays de la Loire
- Coordinates: 47°37′22″N 0°17′29″E
- Country: France
- Region: Pays de la Loire
- Department: Sarthe
- Arrondissement: La Flèche
- Canton: Le Lude
- Intercommunality: Sud Sarthe

Government
  - Mayor (2020–2026): Antony Rousseau
- Area^{1}: 29.3 km^{2} (11.3 sq mi)
- Population (2023): 337
  - Density: 11.5/km^{2} (29.8/sq mi)
- Demonym(s): Arcéen, Arcéenne
- Time zone: UTC+01:00 (CET)
  - Summer (DST): UTC+02:00 (CEST)
- INSEE/Postal code: 72283 /72800
- ^{1} French Land Register data, which excludes lakes, ponds, glaciers > 1 km^{2} (0.386 sq mi or 247 acres) and river estuaries.

Saint-Germain-d'Arcé (French pronunciation: [sɛ̃ ʒɛʁmɛ̃ daʁse]) is a commune in the Sarthe department in the region of Pays de la Loire in north-western France.

== See also ==
- Communes of the Sarthe department
