= Candia (brand) =

French dairy brand

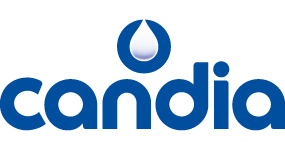
- Logo of Candia
- Company type: Simplified joint-stock company (SASU)
- Industry: Dairy products
- Founded: January 19, 1971; 54 years ago
- Founder: Sodiaal
- Headquarters: 200 Rue Raymond Losserand, 75014 Paris, France
- Key people: Romain Deurbergue
- Products: Milk, cream, butter
- Revenue: €1,172,142,000 (2019) (2019)
- Number of employees: 1,459 (2019)
- Parent: Sodiaal
- Website: candia.fr

Candia is a French commercial brand of dairy products founded in 1971 and owned by the Sodiaal group.

At its inception, Candia was among the first milk brands to emerge on the French national market. Since then, it has driven its growth through innovations in its field—such as UHT bottles, infant milk, cartons with caps, and fortified products—and by establishing a presence in several countries through commercial networks.

== History ==
Candia was launched in 1971 by the Sodima cooperative group (now Sodiaal), which also owns Yoplait. It aimed to create a national milk brand in a market that, at the time, was unbranded and dominated by fresh milk sold in glass bottles. The brand name was a marketing choice inspired by the Latin word candidus (white, pure, bright, radiant), to evoke purity and freshness. The name was created by the naming agency Novamark.

Candia pursued an expansion strategy by introducing innovations such as UHT cartons (milk heated at Ultra High Temperature for extended shelf life), vitamin-fortified milk, plastic bottles, bottles with handles, and screw-cap bottles. The brand also promoted advertising slogans like "La vie va de Candia en Candia" ("Life goes from Candia to Candia").

Candia's growth strategy also involved establishing commercial subsidiaries in Europe (UK, Benelux, Spain, and Italy) and partnering with distributors in various countries. Since 1986, the brand has also developed franchises. These franchises provide not only a brand license but also technical and marketing expertise to agri-food groups in countries where the dairy industry is still growing. As a result, Candia products are available in Africa (Algeria, Libya, Senegal, Ivory Coast, Gabon, Mali, and Burkina Faso), the Middle East (Lebanon and Palestine), and the Indian Ocean islands (Madagascar, Réunion, and Mauritius).

From 2021 to 2024 Candia's milk-butter-cream activities were led by Éric Forin, followed by Romain Deurbergue starting in 2024. The company faces challenges such as a steady decline in milk consumption and increasing competition. During the 2010s, it halved its industrial operations and continues to restructure and resize its facilities.

== Production and commercialization ==
Candia offers a range of fresh dairy products (milk, cream, butter, and chocolate products) and powdered milk, including infant formula.

Its products are distributed through large retail chains, franchisees, and private-label brands.

As of the early 2020s, Candia employed around 1,500 people and operated from two administrative offices (Paris and Lyon), four dairies (Vienne, Lons, Awoingt, and Saint-Étienne), and two butter production sites (Quimper and Clermont-Ferrand).
