= Auguste-Frédéric de Talhouët =

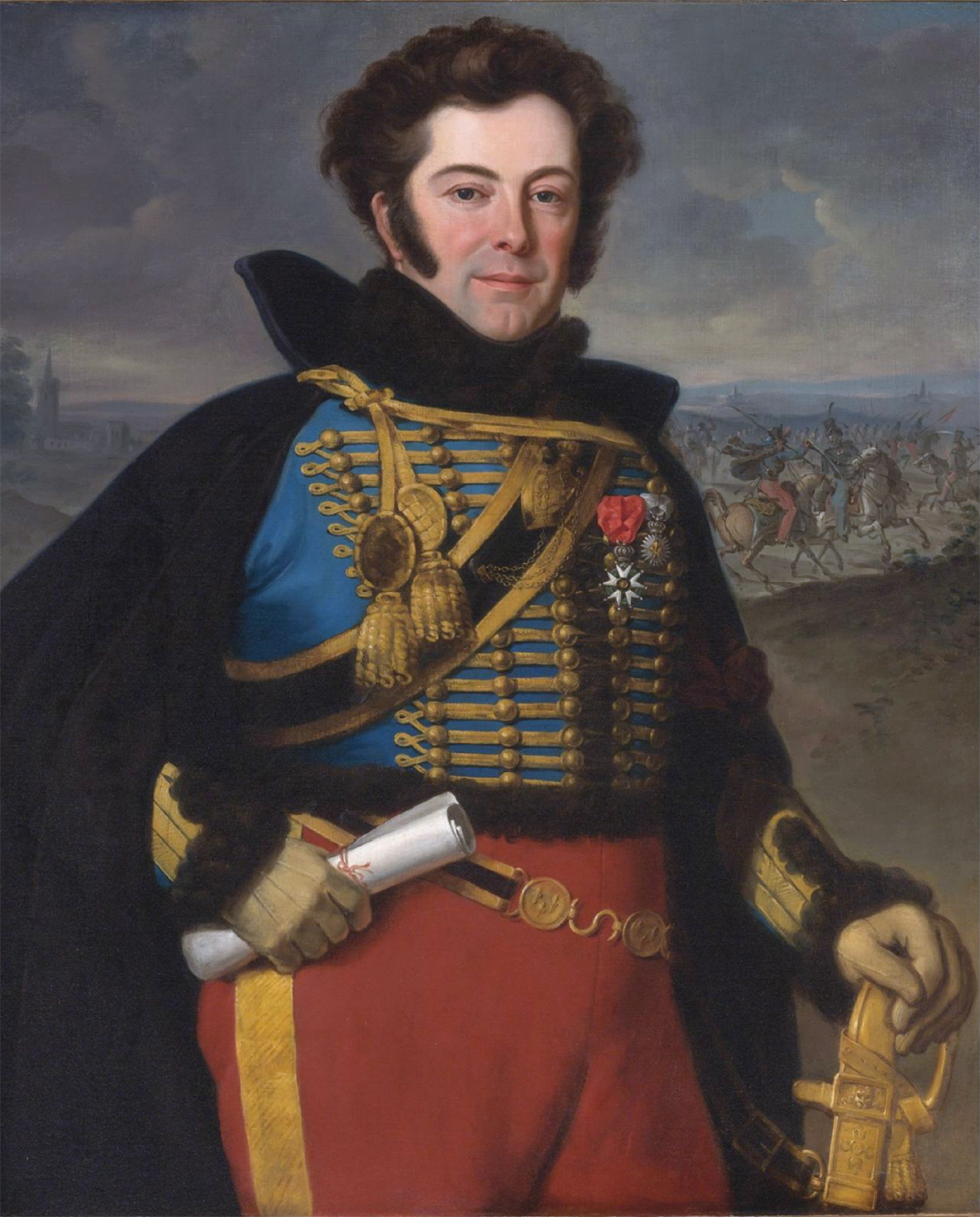
Talhouet by Emile-Jean-Horace Vernet, 1818.

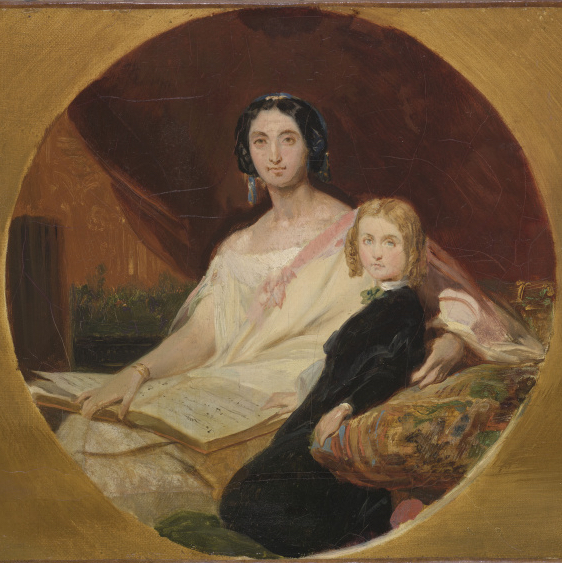
Françoise Antoinette with her eldest daughter.

Auguste-Frédéric de Talhouët-Bonamour, marquis de Talhouët (French pronunciation: [oɡyst fʁedeʁik də talwɛ]; 8 April 1788, Rennes - 12 March 1842, Paris) was a French general of the Napoleonic Wars. He was awarded the Military Merit Order along with several French orders.

== Life ==
The son of Louis Céleste de Talhouët-Bonamour (1761–1812), marquis de Talhouët, and his wife Élisabeth Baude de La Vieuville (1764–1814), Auguste de Talhouët first joined the army in 1804 in a light infantry regiment. He studied at the École spéciale militaire de Fontainebleau and graduated as a sous-lieutenant in the 15th Horse Chasseurs Regiment. He took part in the Prussian campaign, becoming Napoleon's ordnance officer in 1807, a captain in 1809 after the battle of Wagram, a baron of the Empire on 3 August 1810, chef d'escadron in 1811 and an officer of the Légion d'honneur on 29 September 1813 after the battle of Borodino, where he routed a Russian battalion (he had already been made a légionnaire of the Légion d'honneur on 11 July 1807). A few days after Borodino he was appointed colonel of the Mounted Grenadier regiment in the Imperial Guard. Seriously wounded on the retreat from Russia, he only survived thanks to one of his men dragging him to an ambulance.

In 1814 he shifted his allegiance from Napoleon to the restored French monarchy and on 27 December that year was promoted to commander of the Légion d'honneur. He was also made a knight of the Order of the Reunion on 3 April and of the Order of Saint Louis on 27 June that year. He took no action for either side during the Hundred Days and so in September 1815 was appointed maréchal de camp and commander of the Mounted Grenadier Regiment in the Royal Guard. In 1817 he married Alexandrine Roy (1799–1854), daughter of count Antoine Roy, several times minister of finance after the Restoration, bringing de Talhouët a substantial fortune and two children. Their son Auguste Élisabeth Joseph Bon-Amour de Talhouët-Roy (1819–1884), marquis de Talhouët married Léonie Marie Isidore Désirée Sidonie Honnorez (1829–1892) in 1847 and had issue, whilst their daughter Françoise Antoinette Élisabeth Sophie de Talhouët-Roy (1818–1863) married Armand Géraud Victurnien Jacques Emmanuel de Crussol (1808–1872), 11th duke of Uzès in 1836 and had issue.

Promoted to a peer of France on 5 March 1819 before leaving active service, he voted for the right in the upper chamber, took the oath of obedience to the July Monarchy and was member and president of the general counsel for Sarthe, the department which included the château du Lude he had inherited from his mother. In 1819 he was one of the founders of the Société pour l'amélioration des prisons, a prison reform organization. On 31 October 1828 he rose to grand officer of the Légion d'honneur. He fully retired on 17 February 1841, still at the rank of maréchal de camp.

== Sources ==
- (in French) Talhouët (Auguste-Frédéric Bonamour, marquis de) », in Robert et Cougny, Dictionnaire des parlementaires français, 1889, tome V, p. 356
