= Savigné-sous-le-Lude =

- Commune
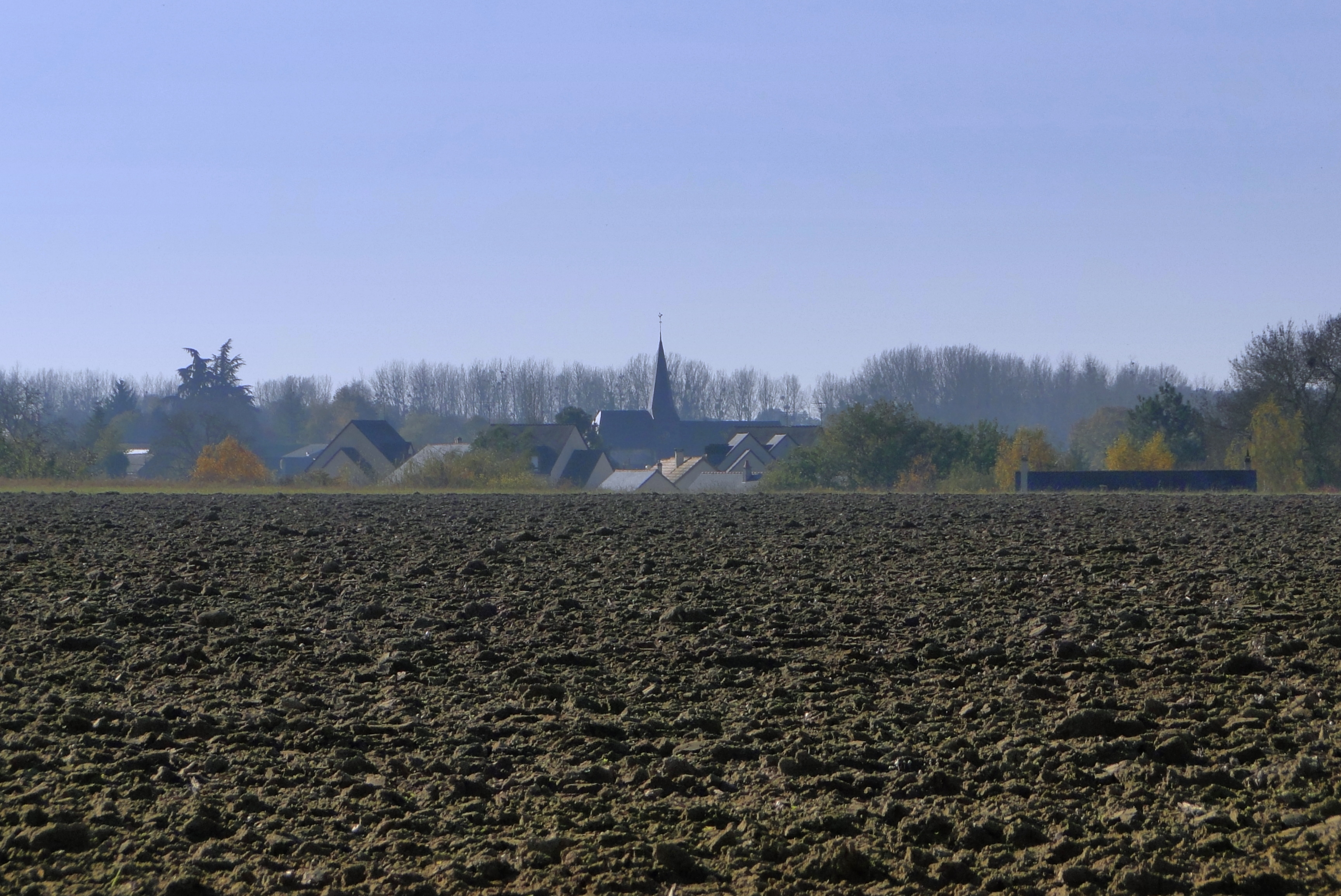
- A general view of Savigné-sous-le-Lude
- Location of Savigné-sous-le-Lude
- Location within France Location within Pays de la Loire
- Coordinates: 47°37′06″N 0°03′26″E
- Country: France
- Region: Pays de la Loire
- Department: Sarthe
- Arrondissement: La Flèche
- Canton: Le Lude
- Intercommunality: Sud Sarthe

Government
  - Mayor (2020–2026): Lydia Robineau
- Area^{1}: 34 km^{2} (13 sq mi)
- Population (2023): 446
  - Density: 13/km^{2} (34/sq mi)
- Time zone: UTC+01:00 (CET)
  - Summer (DST): UTC+02:00 (CEST)
- INSEE/Postal code: 72330 /72800
- ^{1} French Land Register data, which excludes lakes, ponds, glaciers > 1 km^{2} (0.386 sq mi or 247 acres) and river estuaries.

Savigné-sous-le-Lude (French pronunciation: [saviɲe su lə lyd], literally Savigné under Le Lude) is a commune in the Sarthe department in the region of Pays de la Loire in north-western France.

== See also ==
- Communes of the Sarthe department
