= Château de Gallerande =

Castle in Pringé

- Luché-Pringé, Maine, France
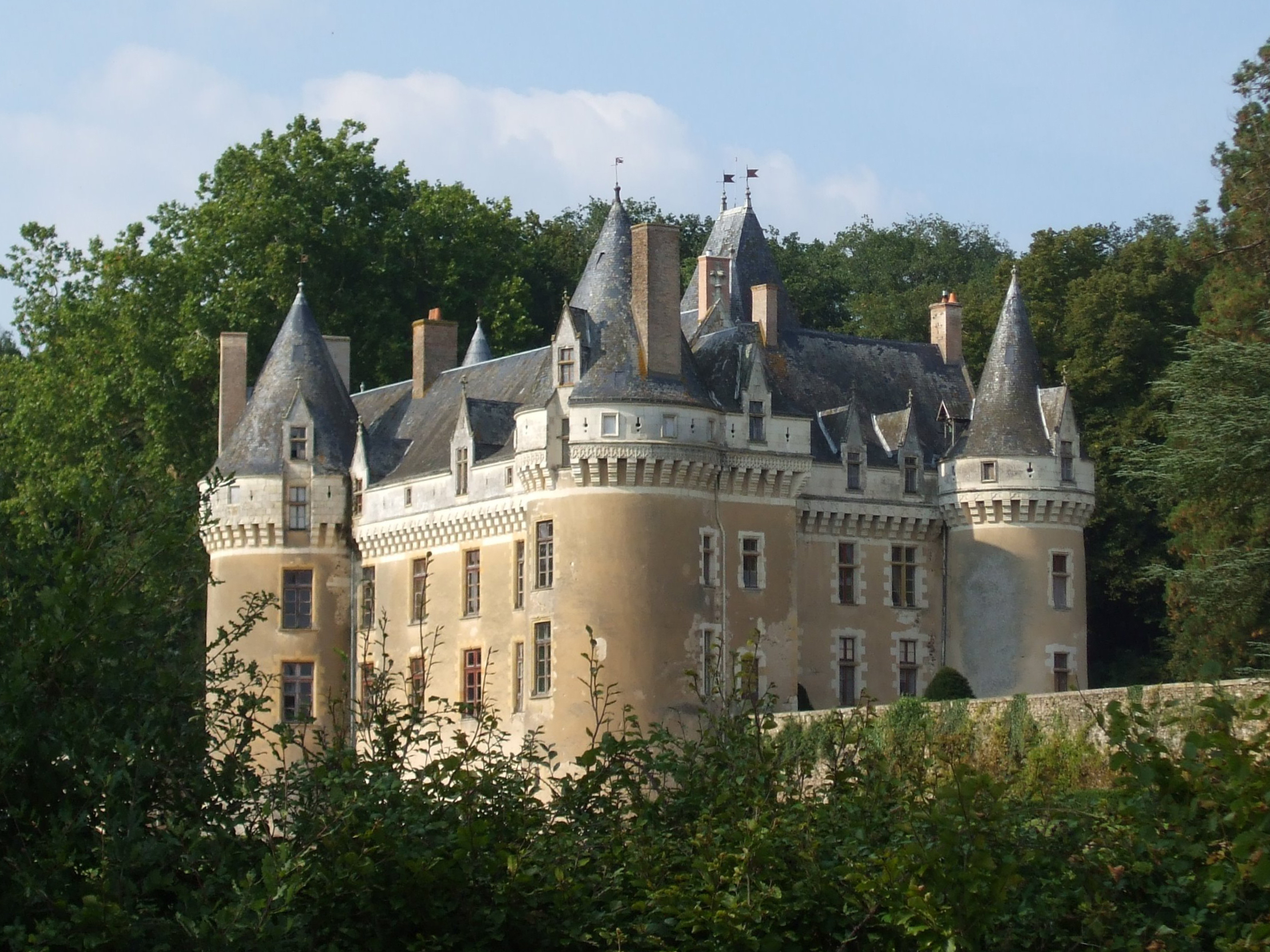

Location
- Coordinates: 47°42′52″N 0°02′14″E

Site history
- Built: 11th century

Château de Gallerande is a building located in Pringé, in the commune of Luché-Pringé, on the borders of the historic regions of Anjou and Maine (in today's Sarthe département), France.

Privately owned, the château is not open to visitors.

== History ==
=== The land of Gallerande in the Middle Ages ===
The first known lord of the land of Gallerande is a certain Garin de Galaranda, in 1173, succeeded by Hugo de Galaranda (before 1180) and Hamelin de Galaranda in 1239. The union of the heiress of these first three lords with Robin II, lord of the neighboring land of Clermont, around 1210, gave rise to the de Clermont-Gallerande family, who held the château for almost six centuries, until the French Revolution.

Château de Gallerande was originally a fortress, built from the eleventh century onwards, coupled with a rather modest dwelling. In the early thirteenth century, Robin III, sixth lord of Clermont-Gallerande, founded a chapel in the nearby church of Notre-Dame de Pringé as a burial place for various family members. In 1275, the castle chapel, known as du Douet, was built. Jean II, grandson of Robin III, extended the Gallerande estate by marrying the heiress of the Mervé land around 1380.

During the Hundred Years' War, the castle was attacked several times by the English. Its chapel was destroyed in 1360. The lord of Gallerande having retired to his Angevin land of Montrevault, custody of the château was entrusted to Guillaume Grugelin, who abandoned it to the English without a fight in 1421, shortly after the battle of Baugé. The castle was retaken by the troops of Constable de Richemont in July 1426, but the English, who had taken refuge in the keep, destroyed it by fire before leaving the site.

=== Rebuilding the castle during the Renaissance ===
In the second third of the 15th century, Louis II, twelfth lord of Clermont-Gallerande and chamberlain to King René d'Anjou, had the château rebuilt, abandoning the defensive character of the feudal fortress for the comfort and aesthetics of Renaissance dwellings. After Louis II's death in 1477, his descendants held important positions in the army and the kingdom's administration.

In 1576 the land of Gallerande was made a marquisate by King Henri III, in favor of Georges I, the local lord. It brought together the seigneuries of Clermont, Gallerande, Mareil, Luché, and Pringé, as well as the fieffées farms of Plessis-Allouin and Plessis-Marchais. The Douet chapel was rebuilt in 1647. During the Wars of Religion, Château de Gallerande was occupied by the League.

=== Contemporary period ===
In 1822 Château de Gallerande was sold to the de Sarcé family, whose last heiress, Anne de la Planche de Ruillé, died in 1985, bequeathing the property to the Sovereign Order of Malta, of which she was a member. The Musée du Louvre acquired a painting by Georges de La Tour, Saint-Thomas à la Pique, kept at the château, for 32 million francs before the property was sold to a wealthy American.

== Architecture ==
Château de Gallerande is located near the village of Pringé, in the middle of a wooded park at the foot of a hill sloping down to the Loir River. It comprises a main building and a wing set back to the rear, accompanied by four cylindrical towers and two quadrangular towers. The flowerbeds are separated from the road by a long canal. The Gallerande estate extends across the road, with two former 18th-century outbuildings housing the Marquis de Gallerande's troops and a dovecote with triangular openings.

== See also ==
- Luché-Pringé

== Bibliography ==
- Schilte, Pierre (1991). Châteaux et gentilhommières du Pays fléchois (in French). Farré.
- Collectif (1998). Autrefois chez nous : Les histoires, les coutumes, les curiosités de nos villages : Luché-Pringé, Mareil-sur-Loir, Saint-Jean-de-la-Motte, Thorée-les-Pins (in French). Association Autrefois chez nous. ISBN 2-9513033-0-0.
- Massin-Le Goff, Guy (2007). Les châteaux néogothiques en Anjou. Le fond des choses (in French). Éditions Nicolas Chaudun. ISBN 978-2-35039-032-1.
- Mousset-Pinard, Françoise; Toulier, Christine; Darrasse, Jean-Baptiste; Desvigne, Virgine (2015). Le Lude en Vallée du Loir. Images du Patrimoine (in French). Éditions 303. ISBN 979-10-93572-11-6.
