= Manoir de Venevelles =

15th-century manor house in Sarthe, France

Coordinates: 47.7175°N 0.1091°E

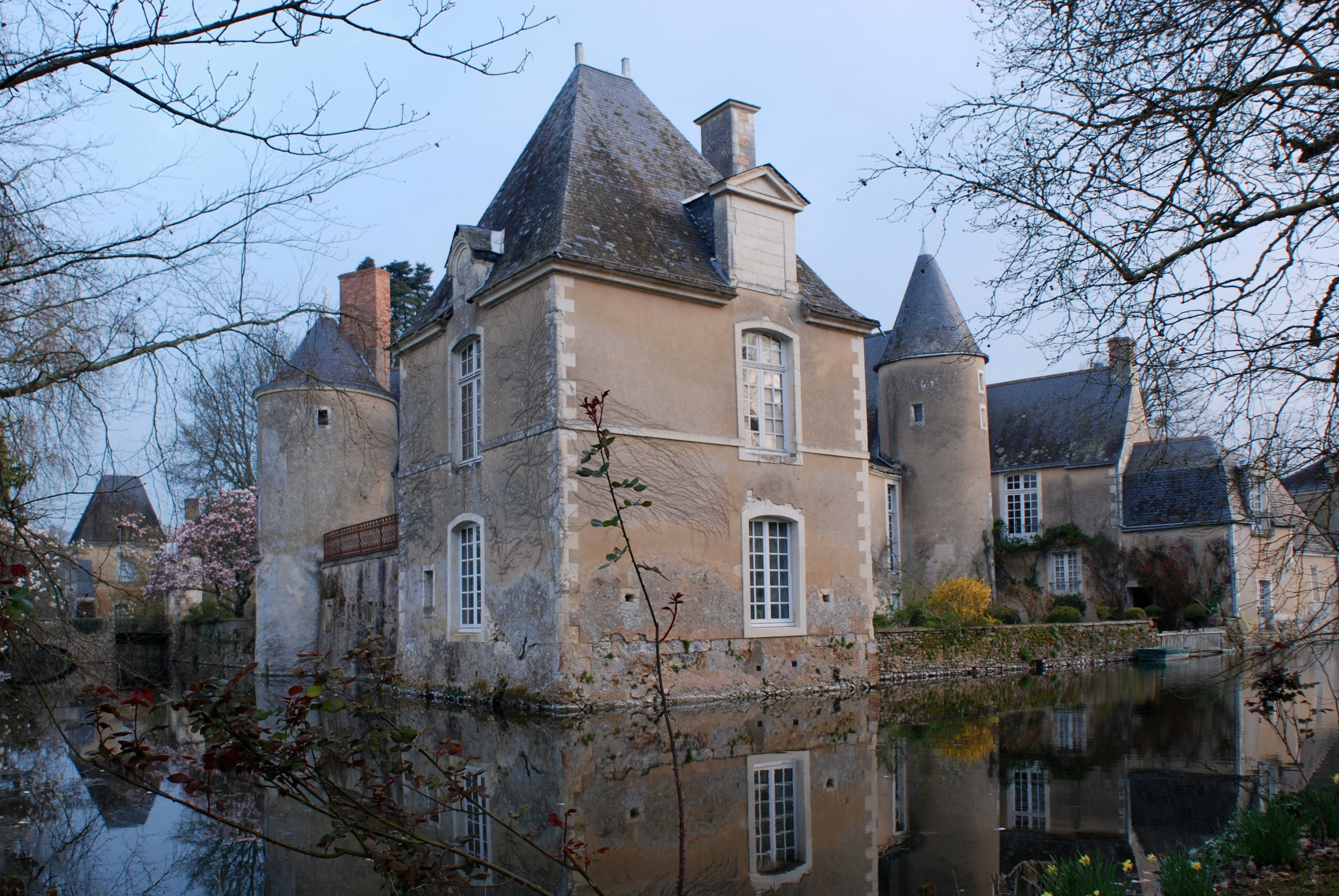
- Interactive map of Manoir de Venevelles
- Location: Venevelles
- Type: Manor house

The Manoir de Venevelles, or Château de Venevelles, is a 15th-century manor house in the commune of Luché-Pringé, in the Sarthe departement of France. Established in the 11th century at the bottom of the Aune valley, at the foot of a wooded hill, the manor was rebuilt after the Hundred Years' War by the d'Espaigne family. Under the impetus of Henri-Paul d'Espaigne and Suzanne Le Vasseur, it became a major center of Calvinism in Anjou in the mid-17th century.

== History ==
=== Origins of the château ===
Located on the borders of Maine, Anjou and Touraine, Venevelles lies at the bottom of a wooded hill that was once the site of a Roman castrum. Venevelles' riverside position, along a Roman road that linked Saint-Jean-de-la-Motte to Le Lude, defended access to the Loir valley. The name Venevelles comes from the Gallic verna, meaning "alder", and val, meaning "valley". The name "vallée des Aulnes" or "vallée de l'Aulne" comes from the site's location on the banks of the river Aune.

The origins of the first owners of the Vénevelles land are not well known. At the end of the 11th century, it belonged to Algerius de Venevelles, a monk from the Abbey of Saint-Aubin in Angers, on which the priory of Luché depended. Herbert d'Espaigne, a modest seigneur from Saint-Gervais-en-Belin, was probably the first d'Espaigne to settle in Venevelles. He appears at the end of the 13th century as seigneur of Venevelles, Aunay and Coullaines. The d'Espaigne family remained owners until the French Revolution, and rebuilt the château after the Hundred Years' War. Marie de Pons, daughter of Jacques de Pons, baron of Mirambeau and Champniers in Périgord, and Marie de La Porte, lady of Champniers and Chambon, married Paul d'Espeigne, lord of Vennevelles and Coulaines, in her first marriage; then, in her second marriage, she married Gédéon de Pressac, lord of Pressac and Lioncel.

=== Modern period ===
The importance and renown of Venevelles grew in the 17th century under the impetus of Henri-Paul d'Espaigne. Gentleman of the King's Chamber, he took part in the siege of Belfort alongside Marshal Henri de La Ferté-Senneterre, then became governor of the town. The land of Venevelles was made a marquisate in his favor in 1654. Henri-Paul d'Espaigne married Suzanne Le Vasseur, heiress of the seigneurs de Cogners, in 1643. Both fervent supporters of the "Protestant Reformed Religion", they made Venevelles one of the most active Calvinist centers in the region, and sent their children to study at the Saumur academy. In memory of this period, the castle's southeast tower is nicknamed the "Huguenotière". Venevelles became the preferred meeting place for Protestant groups from the surrounding area, such as those from Pringé, Mansigné and Dissé.

Henri-Paul d'Espaigne and Suzanne Le Vasseur continued the transformation of the château, transforming the late 15th-century fortified house into a building in keeping with the tastes of the time. While it's not certain that they built the two Louis XIII-style pavilions framing the outbuildings, there is evidence that they did build the one to the south (dated 1652 and probably designed by Le Lude architect Jean Hérault). They had the house extensively remodeled, removing an interior floor to create a noble floor with a high ceiling, and had a grand staircase built, followed by a drawbridge to access the park. The latter was probably built in 1650 by a certain Gaspard Dauphin, a garden contractor in Courcelles. Work continued after the marquis's death in 1656, under the direction of his wife, Suzanne Le Vasseur. Ruined, she sold the estate shortly before her death to her son, who had to part with almost half the leased property of the Venevelles estate to cover his debts. Protestant activity continued at Venevelles, leading to the occupation of the château by the king's dragoons in 1686.

Having finally abjured the Protestant religion, the d'Espaigne family distinguished themselves in the eighteenth century by serving in the armies. Two of them were made knights of the Order of Saint-Louis. Seigneur de Venevelles à l'aube de la Révolution, Henri-Jacques d'Espaigne de Venevelles émigre comme de nombreux nobles et rejoint l'armée de Condé. Château de Venevelles was sold as bien national in 1799 to citoyen Jouanneau. The widow of Henri-Jacques d'Espaigne, Alexandrine-Thérèse de Nieul managed to buy back the estate in 1802, but sold it five years later in view of the heavy expenditure required to maintain the château.

=== Contemporary period ===
In 1807, the property was purchased by Armand Constant Lebaigue, a member of the Parisian bourgeoisie who later became mayor of Luché. On his death in 1859, his granddaughter Marie Louise de Boucher, wife of Jacques de Chabot, inherited the estate and sold it to the Marquis de Brémond in 1887. The Brémond family lived little in Venevelles, occasionally renting the château, before selling it to a notary in La Flèche in 1920, who sold it four years later to an estate agent. A Japanese painter, Toyosaku Saïto, acquired the château in 1926 and moved in with his wife. Musicologist and organist Norbert Dufourcq became the owner of Château de Venevelles in 1955, and on January 21, 1963, the château was listed as a monument historique. As a plaque unveiled by the Préfet de la Sarthe in the château's entrance recalls, for almost thirty years the Dufourcqs were passionate about Venevelles, undertaking major restorations and truly saving the edifice. At the end of his life, thanks to the discovery of local archives, Norbert Dufourcq wrote his last book: Nobles et paysans aux confins du Maine et de l'Anjou: La seigneurie de Venevelles. A historian's work, based on extensive research, this book, with a preface by Jean Favier, is the main source of information on the seigneury of Venevelles.

== Description ==
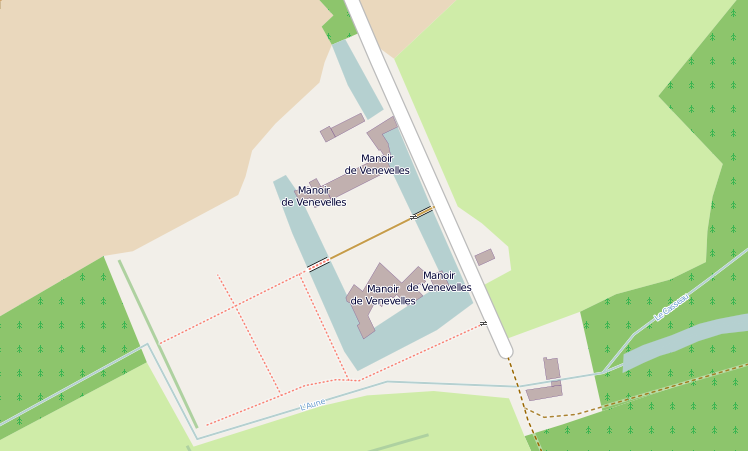
Plan of the Venevelles manor house and surrounding area.

The Manoir de Venevelles sits at the bottom of an east-west valley, at the foot of a wooded hill, at the confluence of the River Aune and its tributary the Casseau. The manor house is surrounded by a wide, deep moat, fed by river water and regulated by a mill a few meters upstream. It was defended by a double body of water: the moat surrounding the quadrilateral on which the buildings were built, and the stream itself, which completely encircled this first defensive organization by displacing the riverbed, probably in the High Middle Ages. In the first third of the century (between 1810 and 1846, dates provided by land registers), the northern branches of the moat and the river were filled in.

Although the lords of Venevelles have been mentioned since the end of the 11th century, no remains of the original château can be found in the current building. Most of the manor's construction dates from the late 15th century. It comprises a central dwelling, built between 1460 and 1480, set at right-angles to each other and framed by two turrets, one facing north-west, the other, nicknamed the "Huguenotière", facing south-east. Two outbuildings were added in the early 16th century, one of which included a chapel blessed in 1503 by Cardinal de Luxembourg, Bishop of Le Mans. The chapel features two Plantagenet-style pointed vaults. The four corner pavilions were built in the 16th and 17th centuries.

Located to the north of the central dwelling, from which it is separated by the vast courtyard of honour, the farmhouse, built during the 16th century, is a long building flanked by two corner pavilions. The entrance gate, once fitted with a drawbridge, dates from 1720 and certainly replaced a 15th-century fortified postern. A second gate surmounts the west moat, which separates the main courtyard from a formal park. Built in 1657, its two pillars bear the initials of Paul-Henri d'Espaigne and Suzanne Le Vasseur.

Several sources attest to the existence of a vast network of underground galleries, one of which linked the Venevelles manor house to the Château de la Grifferie, also in the Luché-Pringé commune.

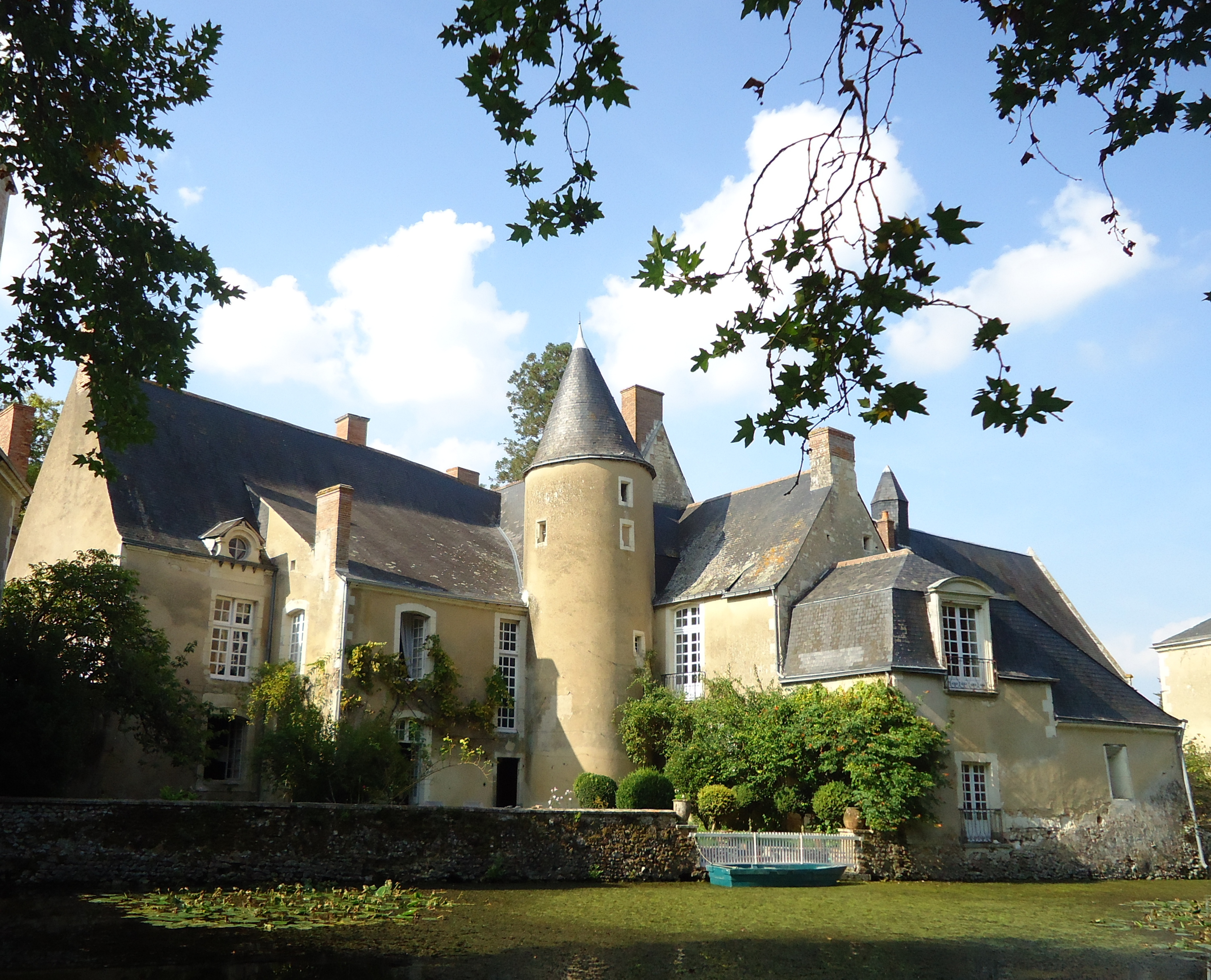

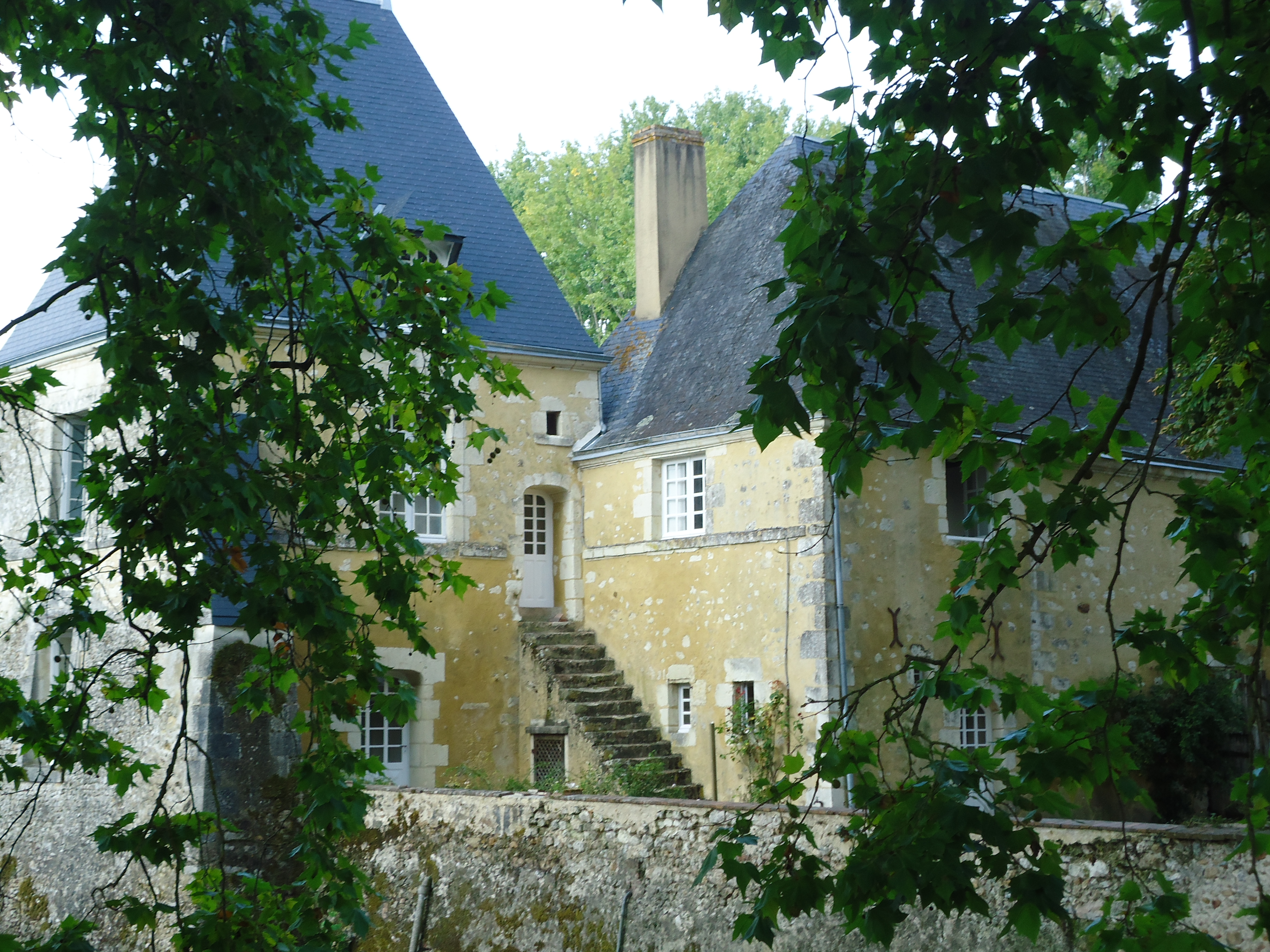

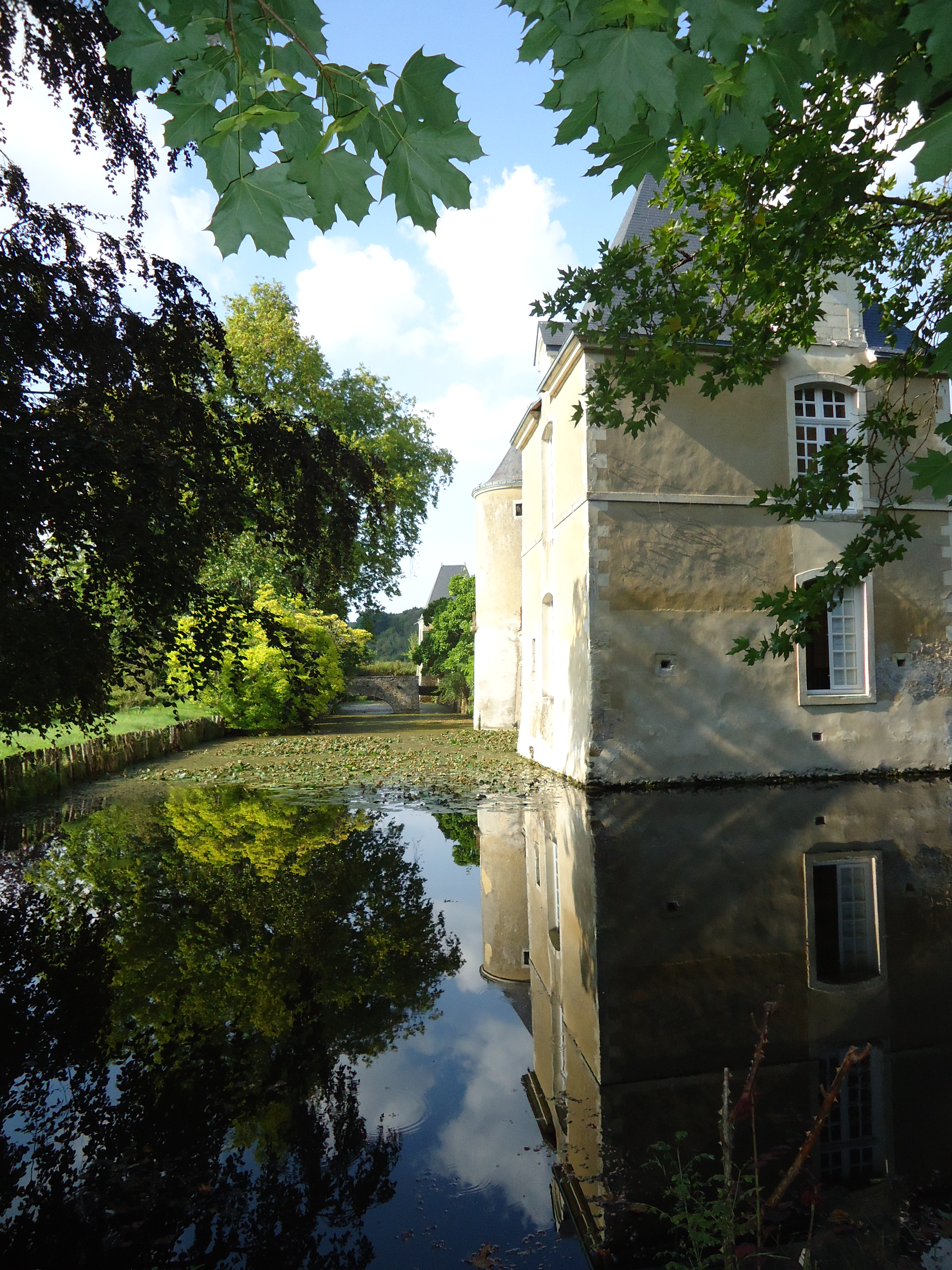

== See also ==
- List of castles in France
- List of châteaux in France
- Château

== Works cited ==
- Dufourcq, Norbert (1988). Nobles et paysans aux confins de l'Anjou et du Maine: La seigneurie de Venevelles. Paris: Picard. ISBN 2-7084-0349-4.
- Schilte, Pierre (1991). Châteaux et gentilhommières du pays fléchois (in French). Cholet: Farré. pp. 205–212.
