= Canton of Le Lude =

Coordinates: 47.65°N 0.15°E

The canton of Le Lude is an administrative division of the Sarthe department, northwestern France. Its borders were modified at the French canton reorganisation which came into effect in March 2015. Its seat is in Le Lude.

It consists of the following communes:

1. Aubigné-Racan
2. La Bruère-sur-Loir
3. Cérans-Foulletourte
4. La Chapelle-aux-Choux
5. Château-l'Hermitage
6. Chenu
7. Coulongé
8. La Fontaine-Saint-Martin
9. Luché-Pringé
10. Le Lude
11. Mansigné
12. Mayet
13. Oizé
14. Pontvallain
15. Requeil
16. Saint-Germain-d'Arcé
17. Saint-Jean-de-la-Motte
18. Sarcé
19. Savigné-sous-le-Lude
20. Vaas
21. Verneil-le-Chétif
22. Yvré-le-Pôlin
