= Sarcé =

- Commune
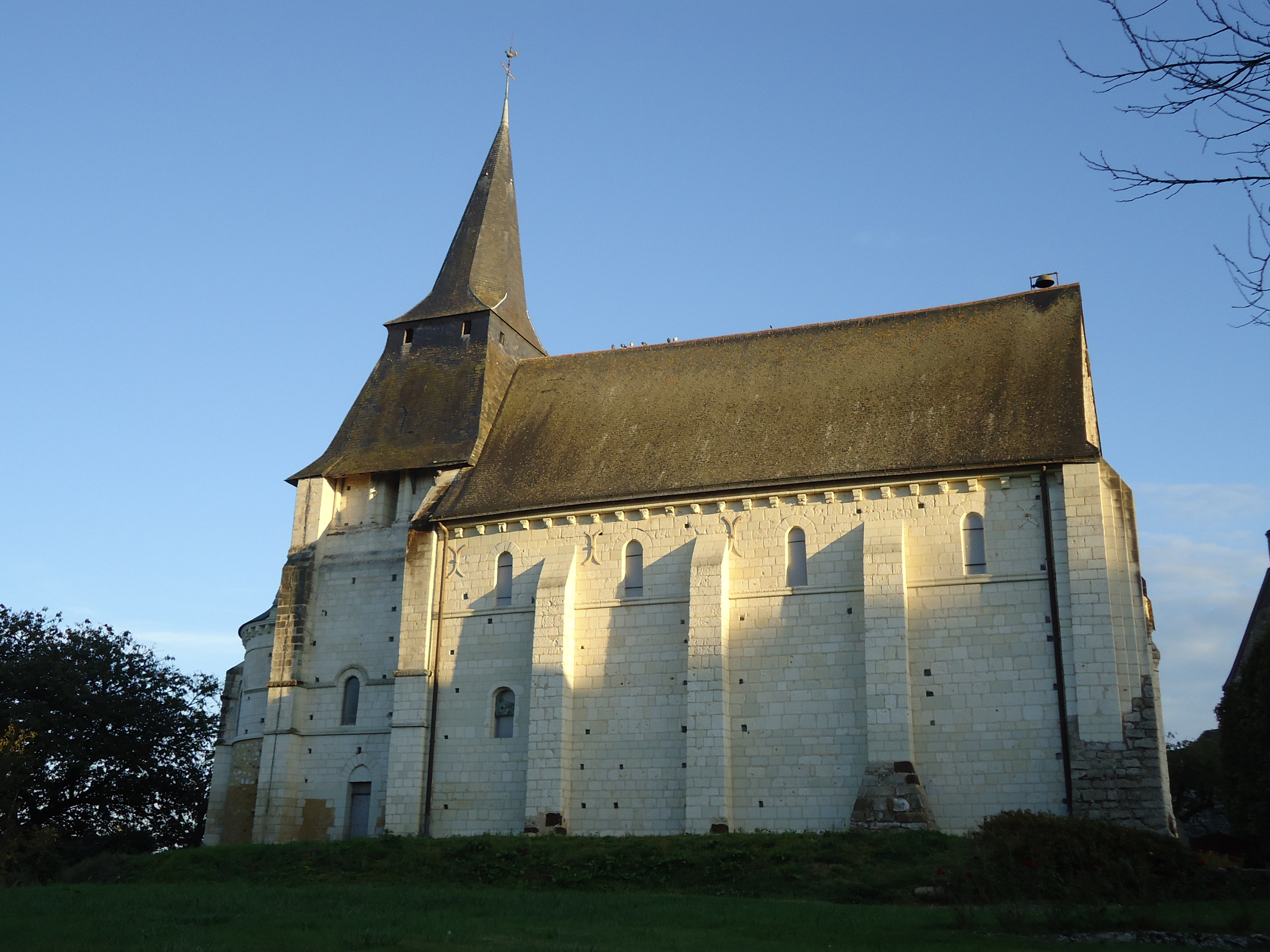
- The church of Saint-Martin, in Sarcé
- Location of Sarcé
- Location within France Location within Pays de la Loire
- Coordinates: 47°43′17″N 0°13′17″E
- Country: France
- Region: Pays de la Loire
- Department: Sarthe
- Arrondissement: La Flèche
- Canton: Le Lude
- Intercommunality: Sud Sarthe

Government
  - Mayor (2021–2026): Michel Duval
- Area^{1}: 11 km^{2} (4.2 sq mi)
- Population (2023): 264
  - Density: 24/km^{2} (62/sq mi)
- Demonym(s): Sarcéen, Sarcéenne
- Time zone: UTC+01:00 (CET)
  - Summer (DST): UTC+02:00 (CEST)
- INSEE/Postal code: 72327 /72360
- ^{1} French Land Register data, which excludes lakes, ponds, glaciers > 1 km^{2} (0.386 sq mi or 247 acres) and river estuaries.

Sarcé (French pronunciation: [saʁse]) is a commune in the Sarthe department in the region of Pays de la Loire, north-western France.

== See also ==
- Communes of the Sarthe department
