= Mervé mill =

15th-century mill in Sarthe, France

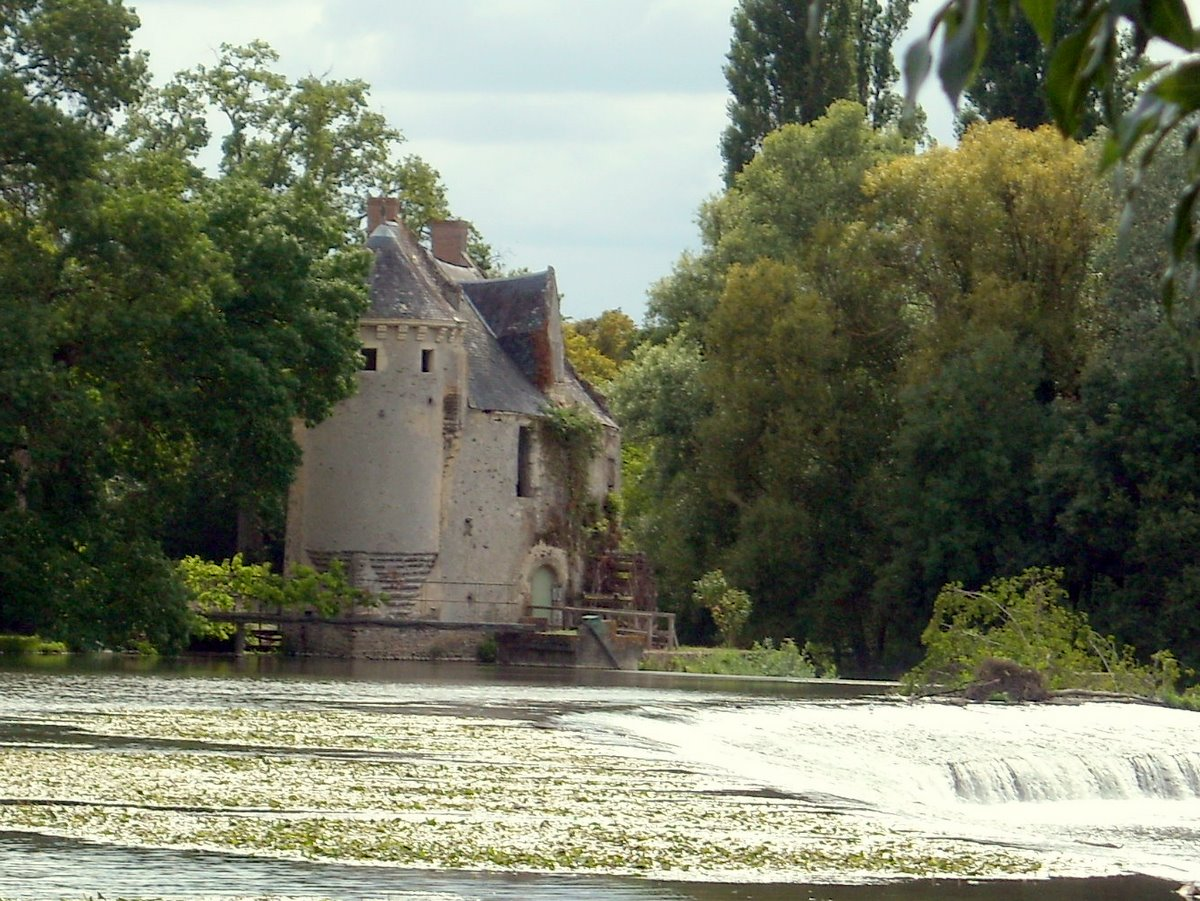
- The Mervé mill on the banks of the Loir.
- Location: Luché-Pringé, Sarthe
- Coordinates: 47°41′50″N 0°03′46″E
- Type: Watermill
- Beginning date: 15th century
- Listed MH (1927)

The Mervé mill is a fortified 15th-century mill located in Luché-Pringé, in the Sarthe department of France.

== History ==
=== From the origins of Mervé to the revolution ===
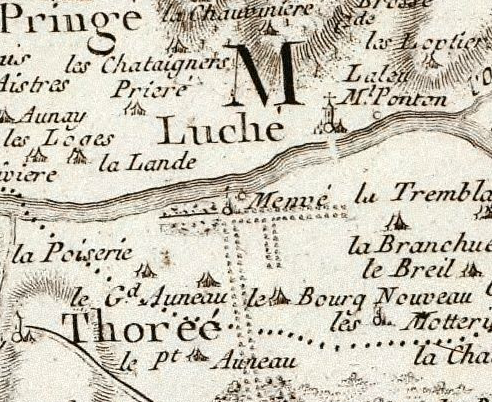
Location of Mervé on the map of the bishopric of Le Mans published by Hubert Jaillot in 1711.

The origins of Mervé date back to the Middle Ages when a fortified castle surrounded by moats fed by the Loir River was established on the site. Sacked during the Revolution, it was abandoned in the early 18th century. In the 14th century, Mervé became the property of the Clermont-Gallerande family following the marriage of the heiress of the Lords of Mervé to Jean II de Clermont-Gallerande. A fortified mill was built in the 15th century on the left bank of the Loir, near the castle. By 1467, the lords of Mervé were paying homage to the Counts of Le Lude for their land in Mervé. This land remained connected to that of Gallerande until 1711 when Charles-Léonor de Clermont sold the Château de Mervé to Henry Fontaine de la Crochinière, Inspector General of Farms in Anjou, who took the name of the estate.

=== Modern period ===
Henry Fontaine's granddaughter, the château owner, married a member of the La Motte d'Aubigné family, a Breton nobleman and commander of the bourgeois militia of La Flèche. They emigrated with their two sons in the early years of the Revolution. One of them, M. de la Motte-Mervé, distinguished himself in the Catholic and Royal Army of Maine, commanded by Count Louis de Bourmont, before dying in combat during the Battle of Le Mans in 1799. The Château de Mervé was sold as national property, and its assets were dispersed. Upon returning from exile, the La Motte family repurchased the château. Faced with the extensive restoration work required for the old fortress, they decided to construct a new residence to replace it. This new rectangular-shaped building was flanked by four round corner towers. Throughout the 19th century, the château passed through successive marriages into the Follin, Carcaradec, and Ruillé families. The Mervé mill was listed as a historic monument on December 22, 1927.

During World War II, the château was occupied by the Germans, who used it as the local headquarters of the Organisation Todt. Upon their departure in 1944, the Germans set fire to the château. Left in ruins, the residence was never restored and was ultimately demolished in 1989.

== Description ==
The Mervé mill is located 1 kilometer southwest of the commune of Luché-Pringé, on the left bank of the Loir River. Built during the Renaissance, it stands on a ship-bow-shaped foundation and features a corbelled turret with machicolations topped by a pepper-pot roof. The mill retains one of its two waterwheels, dating back to the 15th century.

In November 2013, the mill owners received the 15th Vieilles Maisons Françaises Preservation Award for the restoration work carried out on the building.

== Bibliography ==
- Schilte, Pierre (1991). Châteaux et gentilhommières du pays fléchois [Castles and manor houses in the Fleurus region] (in French). Cholet: Farré. pp. 205–212.
- Collectif (1998). Autrefois chez nous : Les histoires, les coutumes, les curiosités de nos villages [Autrefois chez nous: The stories, customs and curiosities of our villages] (in French). Luché-Pringé: Association Autrefois chez nous. ISBN 2-9513033-0-0.
- Collectif (2000). Le patrimoine des communes de la Sarthe [The heritage of the municipalities of the Sarthe] (in French). Vol. 1. Paris: Flohic Éditions. p. 733. ISBN 2-84234-106-6.
