= Requeil =

- Commune
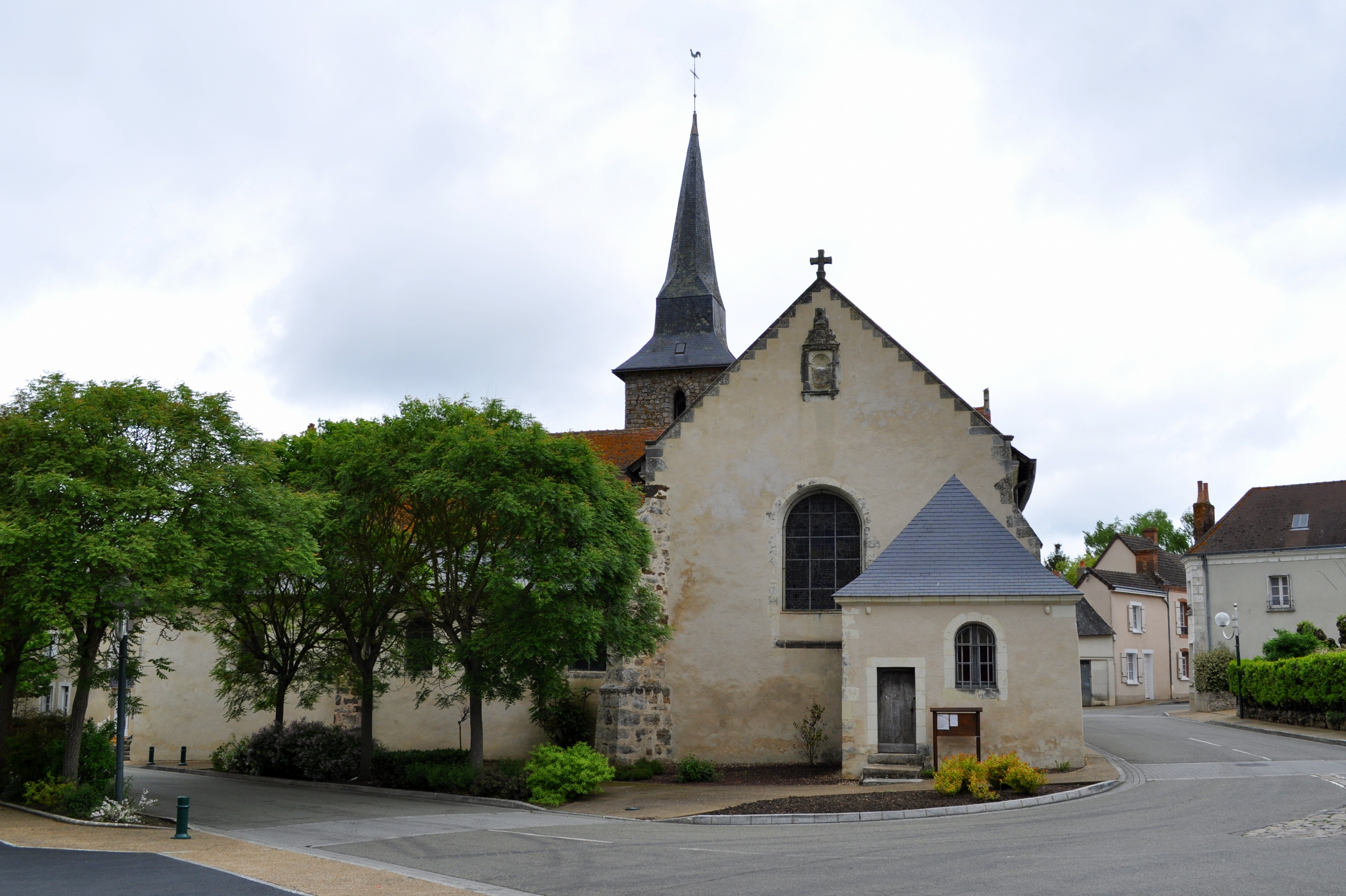
- The church of Saint-Pierre
- Location of Requeil
- Location within France Location within Pays de la Loire
- Coordinates: 47°47′05″N 0°09′49″E
- Country: France
- Region: Pays de la Loire
- Department: Sarthe
- Arrondissement: La Flèche
- Canton: Le Lude
- Intercommunality: Sud Sarthe

Government
  - Mayor (2020–2026): Christiane Martin
- Area^{1}: 14.1 km^{2} (5.4 sq mi)
- Population (2023): 1,108
  - Density: 78.6/km^{2} (204/sq mi)
- Demonym(s): Requeillois, Requeilloise
- Time zone: UTC+01:00 (CET)
  - Summer (DST): UTC+02:00 (CEST)
- INSEE/Postal code: 72252 /72510
- ^{1} French Land Register data, which excludes lakes, ponds, glaciers > 1 km^{2} (0.386 sq mi or 247 acres) and river estuaries.

Requeil (French pronunciation: [ʁəkɛj]) is a commune in the Sarthe department in the region of Pays de la Loire in north-western France.

== See also ==
- Communes of the Sarthe department
