= La Chapelle-aux-Choux =

- Commune
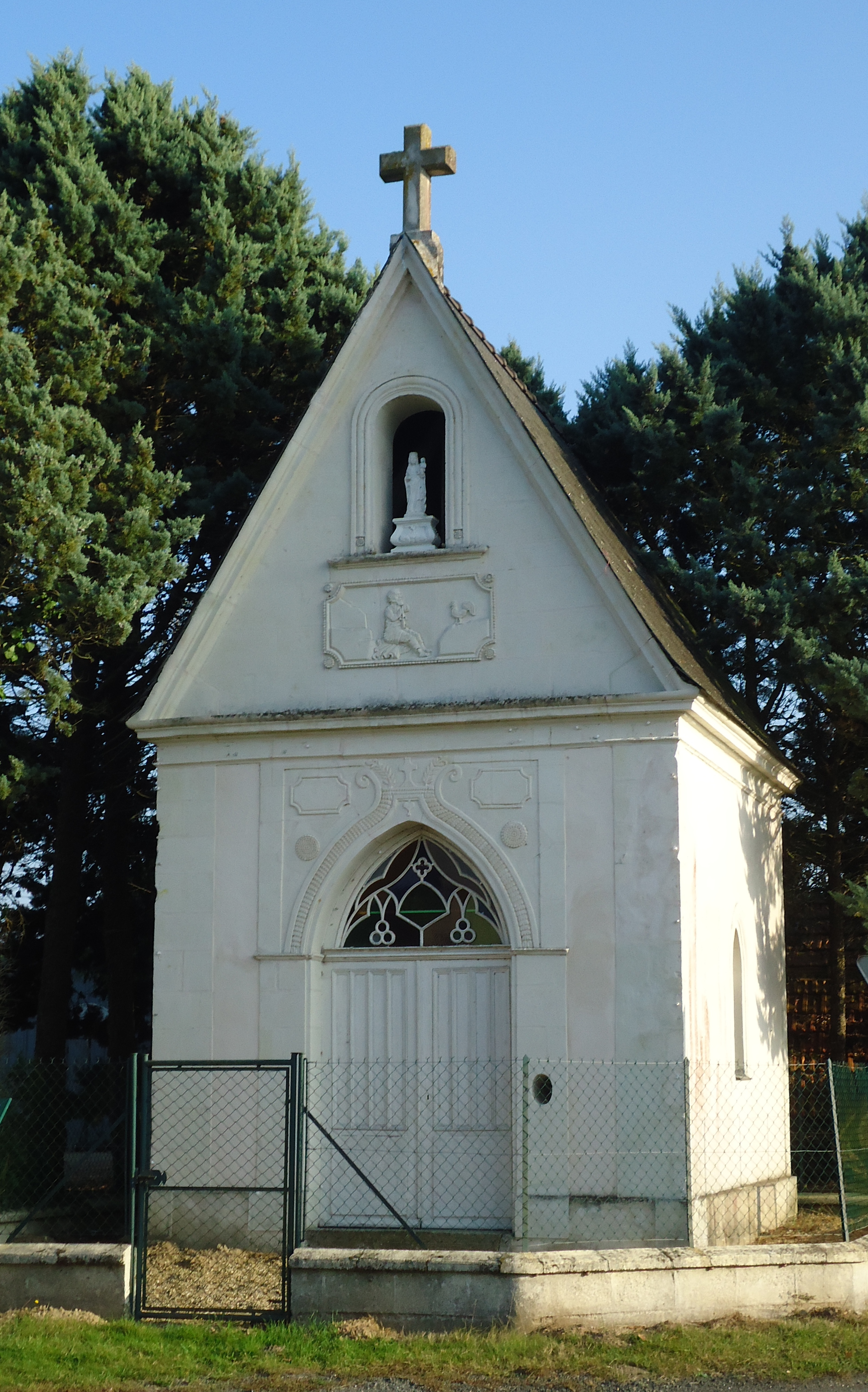
- Mabilleau chapel
- Location of La Chapelle-aux-Choux
- Location within France Location within Pays de la Loire
- Coordinates: 47°38′02″N 0°13′57″E
- Country: France
- Region: Pays de la Loire
- Department: Sarthe
- Arrondissement: La Flèche
- Canton: Le Lude
- Intercommunality: Sud Sarthe

Government
  - Mayor (2020–2026): Émile Guillon
- Area^{1}: 14.6 km^{2} (5.6 sq mi)
- Population (2023): 283
  - Density: 19.4/km^{2} (50.2/sq mi)
- Demonym(s): Chapellois, Chapelloise
- Time zone: UTC+01:00 (CET)
  - Summer (DST): UTC+02:00 (CEST)
- INSEE/Postal code: 72060 /72800
- ^{1} French Land Register data, which excludes lakes, ponds, glaciers > 1 km^{2} (0.386 sq mi or 247 acres) and river estuaries.

La Chapelle-aux-Choux (French pronunciation: [la ʃapɛl o ʃu]) is a commune in the Sarthe department in the Pays de la Loire region in north-western France.

== See also ==
- Communes of the Sarthe department
