= La Fontaine-Saint-Martin =

- Commune
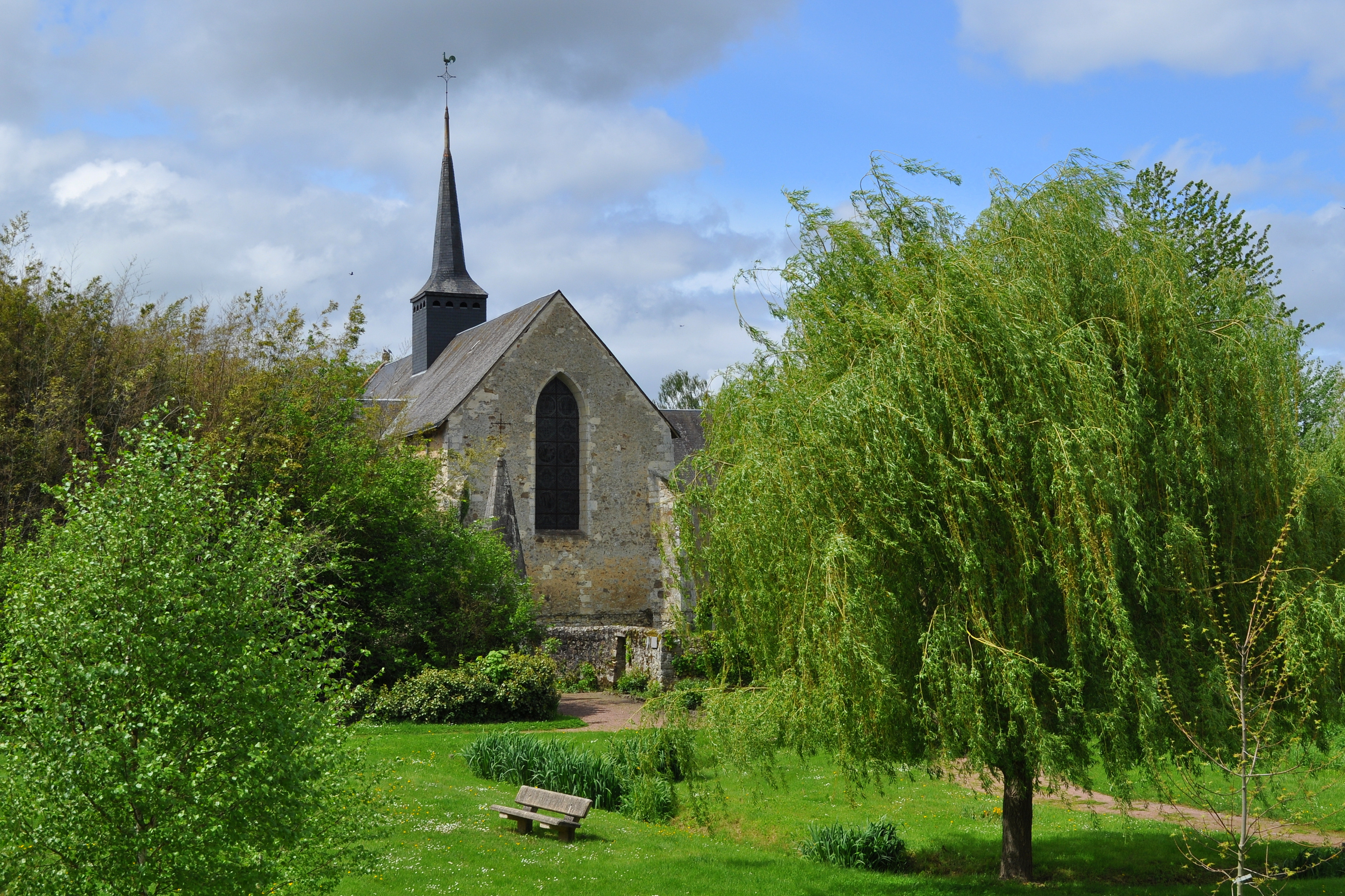
- The church of Saint-Martin, La Fontaine-Saint-Martin
- Location of La Fontaine-Saint-Martin
- Location within France Location within Pays de la Loire
- Coordinates: 47°47′27″N 0°02′56″E
- Country: France
- Region: Pays de la Loire
- Department: Sarthe
- Arrondissement: La Flèche
- Canton: Le Lude
- Intercommunality: Pays Fléchois

Government
  - Mayor (2020–2026): Christophe Libert
- Area^{1}: 13.72 km^{2} (5.30 sq mi)
- Highest elevation: 100 m (330 ft)
- Lowest elevation: 49 m (161 ft)
- Population (2023): 599
  - Density: 43.7/km^{2} (113/sq mi)
- Demonym(s): Fontainois, Fontainoise
- Time zone: UTC+01:00 (CET)
  - Summer (DST): UTC+02:00 (CEST)
- INSEE/Postal code: 72135 /72330
- ^{1} French Land Register data, which excludes lakes, ponds, glaciers > 1 km^{2} (0.386 sq mi or 247 acres) and river estuaries.

La Fontaine-Saint-Martin (French pronunciation: [la fɔ̃tɛn sɛ̃ maʁtɛ̃]) is a commune in the Sarthe department in the region of Pays de la Loire in north-western France.

== See also ==
- Communes of the Sarthe department
