= Château-l'Hermitage =

- Commune
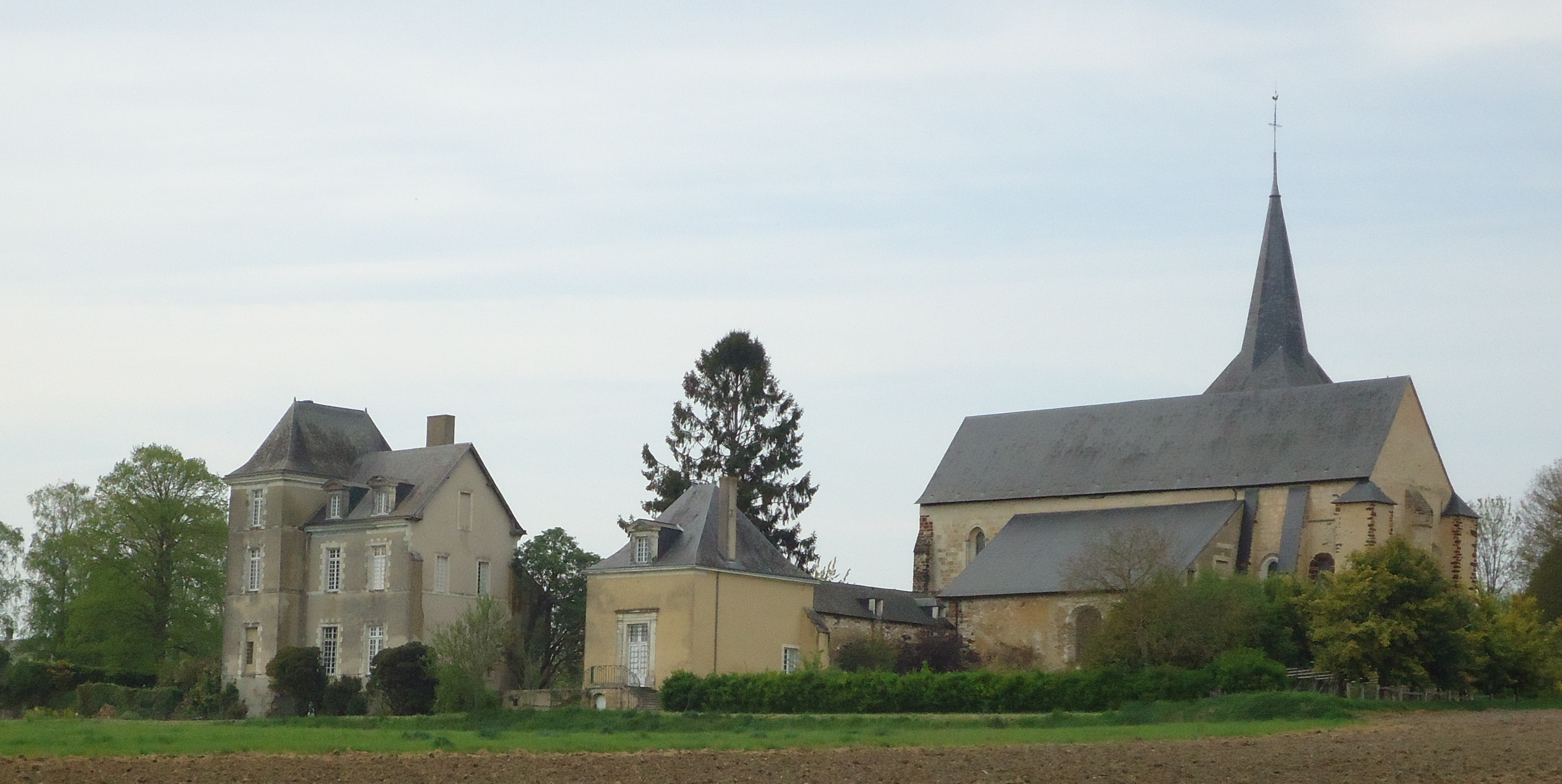
- The old priory

- Coat of arms
- Location of Château-l'Hermitage
- Location within France Location within Pays de la Loire
- Coordinates: 47°48′16″N 0°10′57″E
- Country: France
- Region: Pays de la Loire
- Department: Sarthe
- Arrondissement: La Flèche
- Canton: Le Lude
- Intercommunality: Sud Sarthe

Government
  - Mayor (2020–2026): Jean-Luc Loriot
- Area^{1}: 9.39 km^{2} (3.63 sq mi)
- Highest elevation: 112 m (367 ft)
- Lowest elevation: 51 m (167 ft)
- Population (2023): 256
  - Density: 27.3/km^{2} (70.6/sq mi)
- Demonym(s): Castelien, Castelienne
- Time zone: UTC+01:00 (CET)
  - Summer (DST): UTC+02:00 (CEST)
- INSEE/Postal code: 72072 /72510
- ^{1} French Land Register data, which excludes lakes, ponds, glaciers > 1 km^{2} (0.386 sq mi or 247 acres) and river estuaries.

Château-l'Hermitage is a commune in the Sarthe department in the Pays de la Loire region in north-western France.

== See also ==
- Communes of the Sarthe department
