= La Bruère-sur-Loir =

- Commune
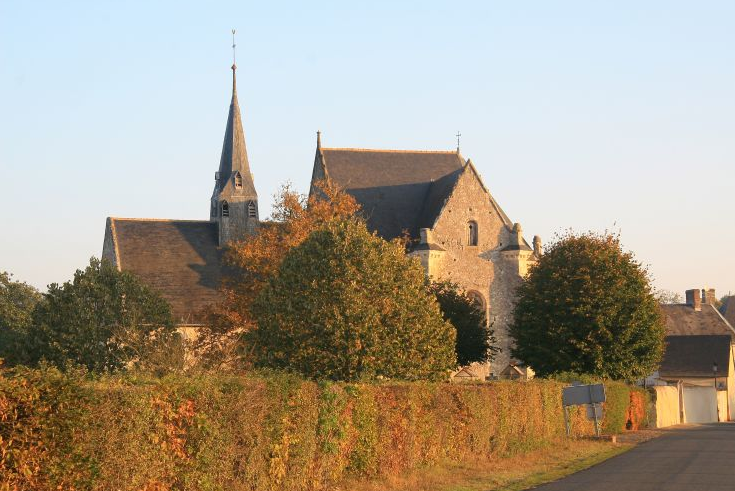
- The church of Saint-Martin
- Location of La Bruère-sur-Loir
- Location within France Location within Pays de la Loire
- Coordinates: 47°39′05″N 0°20′59″E
- Country: France
- Region: Pays de la Loire
- Department: Sarthe
- Arrondissement: La Flèche
- Canton: Le Lude
- Intercommunality: Sud Sarthe

Government
  - Mayor (2020–2026): Dominique Paquet
- Area^{1}: 11.6 km^{2} (4.5 sq mi)
- Population (2023): 250
  - Density: 22/km^{2} (56/sq mi)
- Demonym(s): Bruérois, Bruéroise
- Time zone: UTC+01:00 (CET)
  - Summer (DST): UTC+02:00 (CEST)
- INSEE/Postal code: 72049 /72500
- ^{1} French Land Register data, which excludes lakes, ponds, glaciers > 1 km^{2} (0.386 sq mi or 247 acres) and river estuaries.

La Bruère-sur-Loir (French pronunciation: [la bʁyɛʁ syʁ lwaʁ], literally La Bruère on Loir) is a commune in the Sarthe department in the region of Pays de la Loire in north-western France.

== See also ==
- Communes of the Sarthe department
