= Yvré-le-Pôlin =

- Commune
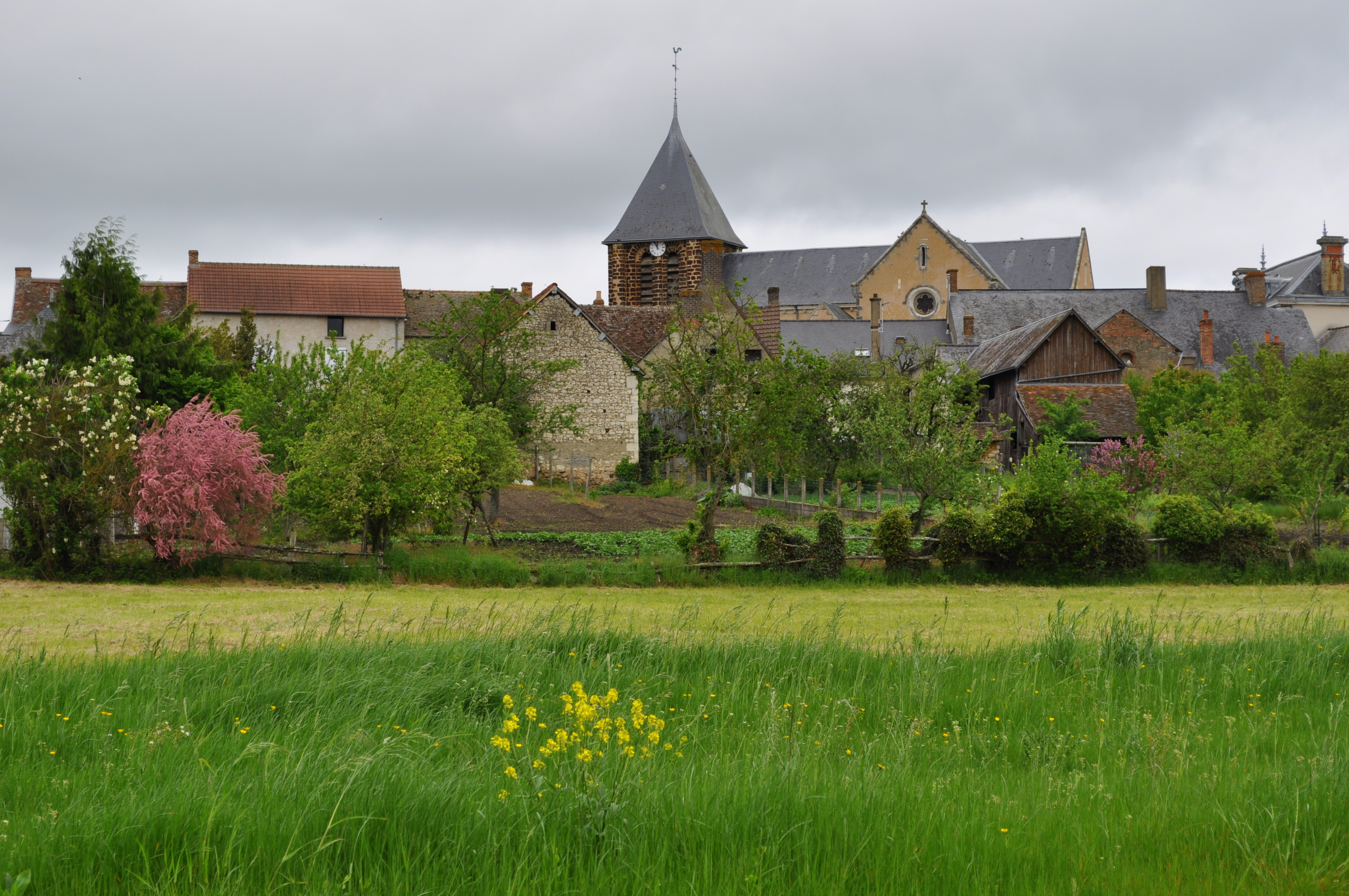
- A general view of Yvré-le-Pôlin

- Coat of arms
- Location of Yvré-le-Pôlin
- Location within France Location within Pays de la Loire
- Coordinates: 47°49′12″N 0°09′14″E
- Country: France
- Region: Pays de la Loire
- Department: Sarthe
- Arrondissement: La Flèche
- Canton: Le Lude
- Intercommunality: Sud Sarthe

Government
  - Mayor (2020–2026): Christian Lelarge
- Area^{1}: 21.84 km^{2} (8.43 sq mi)
- Highest elevation: 112 m (367 ft)
- Lowest elevation: 41 m (135 ft)
- Population (2023): 1,717
  - Density: 78.62/km^{2} (203.6/sq mi)
- Demonym(s): Paulinais, Paulinaises
- Time zone: UTC+01:00 (CET)
  - Summer (DST): UTC+02:00 (CEST)
- INSEE/Postal code: 72385 /72330
- ^{1} French Land Register data, which excludes lakes, ponds, glaciers > 1 km^{2} (0.386 sq mi or 247 acres) and river estuaries.

Yvré-le-Pôlin (French pronunciation: [ivʁe lə polɛ̃]) is a commune in the Sarthe department in the region of Pays de la Loire in north-western France.

== Population ==
Historical population

Year	Pop.	±% p.a.
1793	1,265	—
1800	1,289	+0.27%
1806	1,340	+0.65%
1821	1,510	+0.80%
1831	1,602	+0.59%
1836	1,557	−0.57%
1841	1,523	−0.44%
1846	1,545	+0.29%
1851	1,558	+0.17%
1856	1,470	−1.16%
1861	1,428	−0.58%
1866	1,408	−0.28%
1872	1,372	−0.43%
1876	1,286	−1.61%
1881	1,253	−0.52%
1886	1,281	+0.44%
1891	1,248	−0.52%
1896	1,269	+0.33%
1901	1,250	−0.30%

Year	Pop.	±% p.a.
1906	1,229	−0.34%
1911	1,220	−0.15%
1921	1,080	−1.21%
1926	1,054	−0.49%
1931	1,004	−0.97%
1936	942	−1.27%
1946	908	−0.37%
1954	866	−0.59%
1962	864	−0.03%
1968	942	+1.45%
1975	1,386	+5.67%
1982	1,740	+3.30%
1990	1,619	−0.90%
1999	1,665	+0.31%
2007	1,870	+1.46%
2012	1,818	−0.56%
2017	1,768	−0.56%
2023	1,717	−0.49%

Source: EHESS (1793-1999) and INSEE

== See also ==
- Communes of the Sarthe department
