= Luché-Pringé =

- Commune
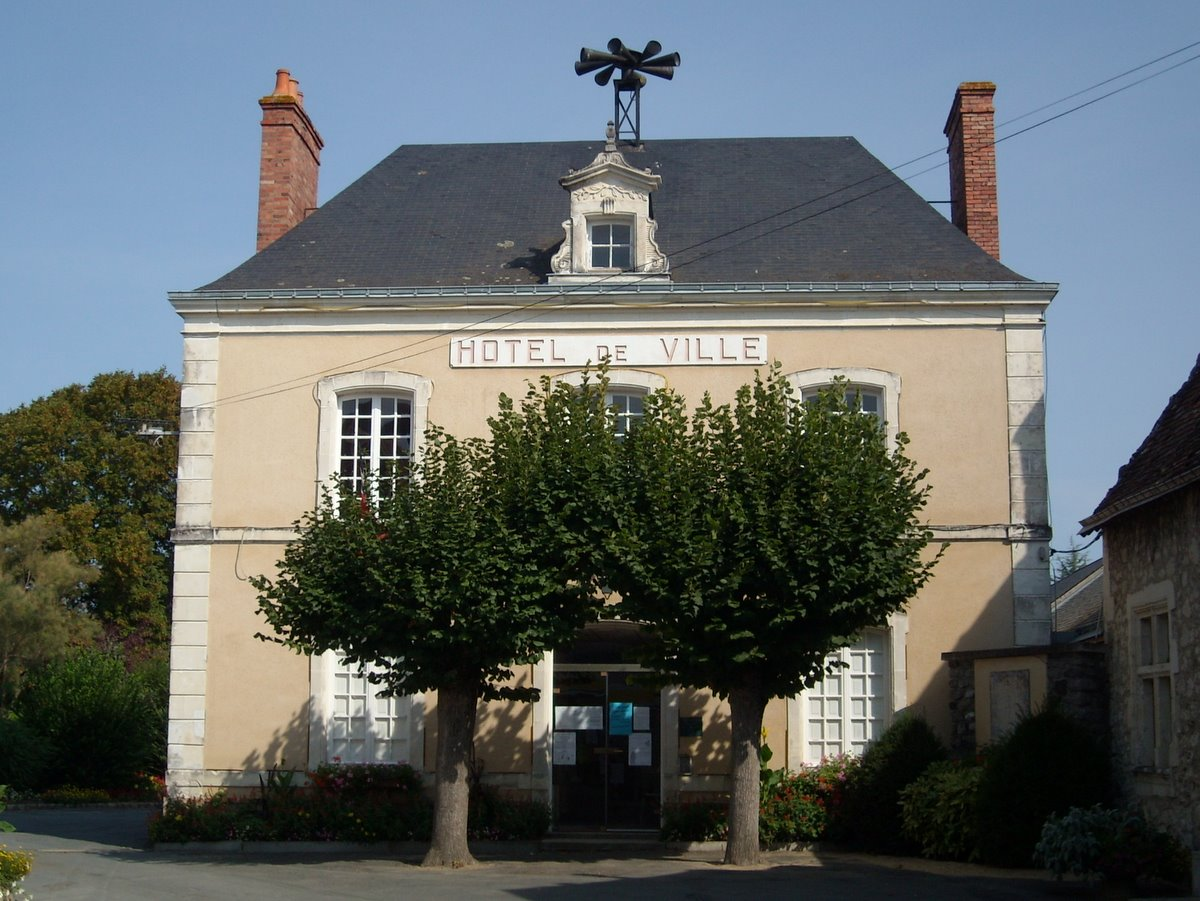
- The town hall of Luché-Pringé

- Coat of arms
- Location of Luché-Pringé
- Location within France Location within Pays de la Loire
- Coordinates: 47°42′14″N 0°04′35″E
- Country: France
- Region: Pays de la Loire
- Department: Sarthe
- Arrondissement: La Flèche
- Canton: Le Lude
- Intercommunality: Sud Sarthe

Government
  - Mayor (2020–2026): Marc Lesschaeve
- Area^{1}: 49.39 km^{2} (19.07 sq mi)
- Highest elevation: 109 m (358 ft)
- Lowest elevation: 28 m (92 ft)
- Population (2023): 1,535
  - Density: 31.08/km^{2} (80.49/sq mi)
- Demonym(s): Luchois, Luchoise
- Time zone: UTC+01:00 (CET)
  - Summer (DST): UTC+02:00 (CEST)
- INSEE/Postal code: 72175 /72800
- ^{1} French Land Register data, which excludes lakes, ponds, glaciers > 1 km^{2} (0.386 sq mi or 247 acres) and river estuaries.

Luché-Pringé (French pronunciation: [lyʃe pʁɛ̃ʒe]) is a commune in the Sarthe department in the region of Pays de la Loire in north-western France.

== See also ==
- Communes of the Sarthe department
- Saint-Martin de Luché Church
- Notre-Dame-de-l'Assomption, Luché-Pringé
- Manoir de Venevelles
- Mervé mill
