= Mansigné =

- Commune
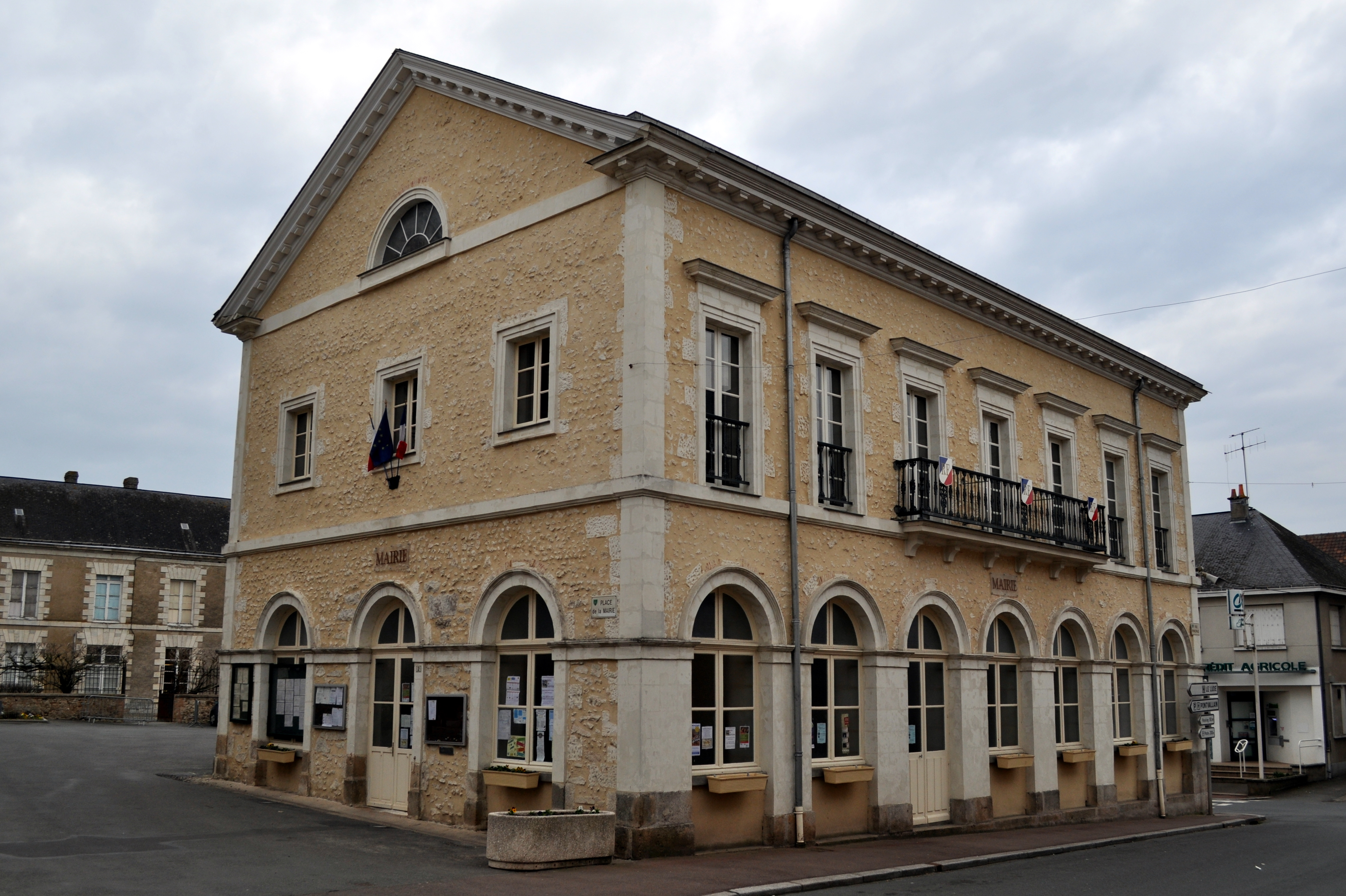
- The town hall of Mansigné

- Coat of arms
- Location of Mansigné
- Location within France Location within Pays de la Loire
- Coordinates: 47°44′51″N 0°08′12″E
- Country: France
- Region: Pays de la Loire
- Department: Sarthe
- Arrondissement: La Flèche
- Canton: Le Lude
- Intercommunality: Sud Sarthe

Government
  - Mayor (2020–2026): François Boussard
- Area^{1}: 36.5 km^{2} (14.1 sq mi)
- Population (2023): 1,555
  - Density: 42.6/km^{2} (110/sq mi)
- Demonym(s): Mansignéen, Mansignéenne
- Time zone: UTC+01:00 (CET)
  - Summer (DST): UTC+02:00 (CEST)
- INSEE/Postal code: 72182 /72510
- ^{1} French Land Register data, which excludes lakes, ponds, glaciers > 1 km^{2} (0.386 sq mi or 247 acres) and river estuaries.

Mansigné (French pronunciation: [mɑ̃siɲe]) is a commune in the Sarthe department in the region of Pays de la Loire in north-western France.

== See also ==
- Communes of the Sarthe department
