= Notre-Dame-de-l'Assomption, Luché-Pringé =

11th-century parish church in Sarthe, France

Coordinates: 47°42′44″N 0°02′52″E

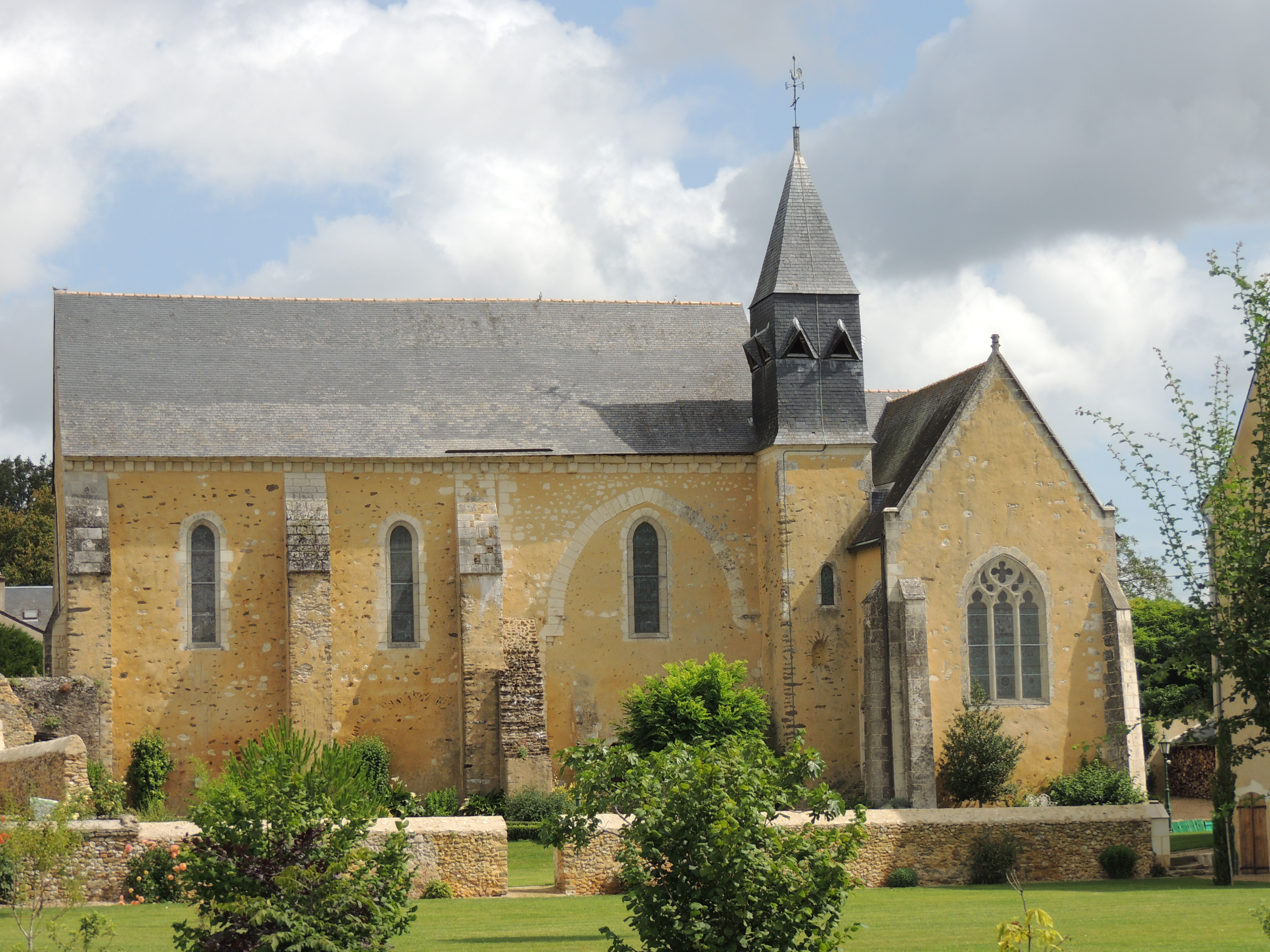
- South view of the church.

Religion
- Affiliation: Catholic church
- District: Luché-Pringé
- Province: Sarthe
- Region: Pays de la Loire

Location
- Country: France
- Interactive map of Notre-Dame-de-l'Assomption, Luché-Pringé

Architecture
- Completed: 12th century

Notre-Dame-de-l'Assomption is a church in Luché-Pringé, France.

== Location ==
The church is located in the village of Pringé in the commune of Luché-Pringé, in the French department of Sarthe.

== History ==
Notre-Dame de Pringé church dates back to the 11th century, at the height of the Romanesque period. At the time, it consisted of a single nave. In the 13th century, the last bay of the nave and the chancel were covered with ribbed vaults in the Angevin style, resting on leaning columns adorned with sculpted capitals.

The church was altered in the 15th century with the addition of two vaulted side chapels, forming a false transept.

The building was listed as a monument historique by decree of March 24, 1975.

== Description ==
=== Architecture ===
Pringé's Romanesque church features a single nave covered by a roof frame, a choir adorned with blind arctures topped by geminated bays, and a cul-de-four apse. It is built of limestone on a Latin cross plan, with a slate roof. The portal, with its voussoirs resting on ornate but well-worn capitals, is located on the west gable. To the north, the church retains the remains of a former cemetery, of which a few 18th-century tombs remain, while to the south is the former presbytery, in the form of a turreted dwelling.

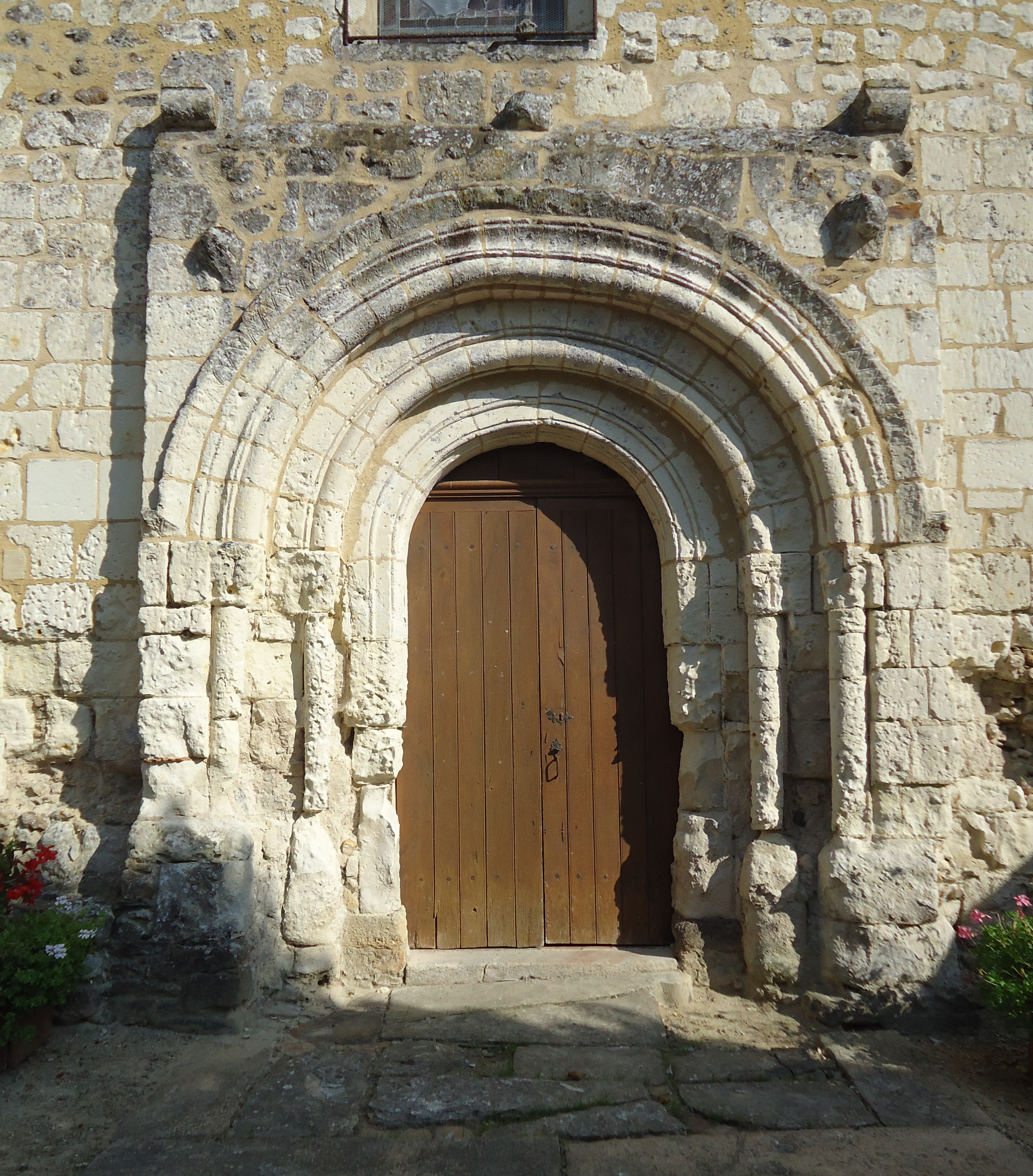
The gate.

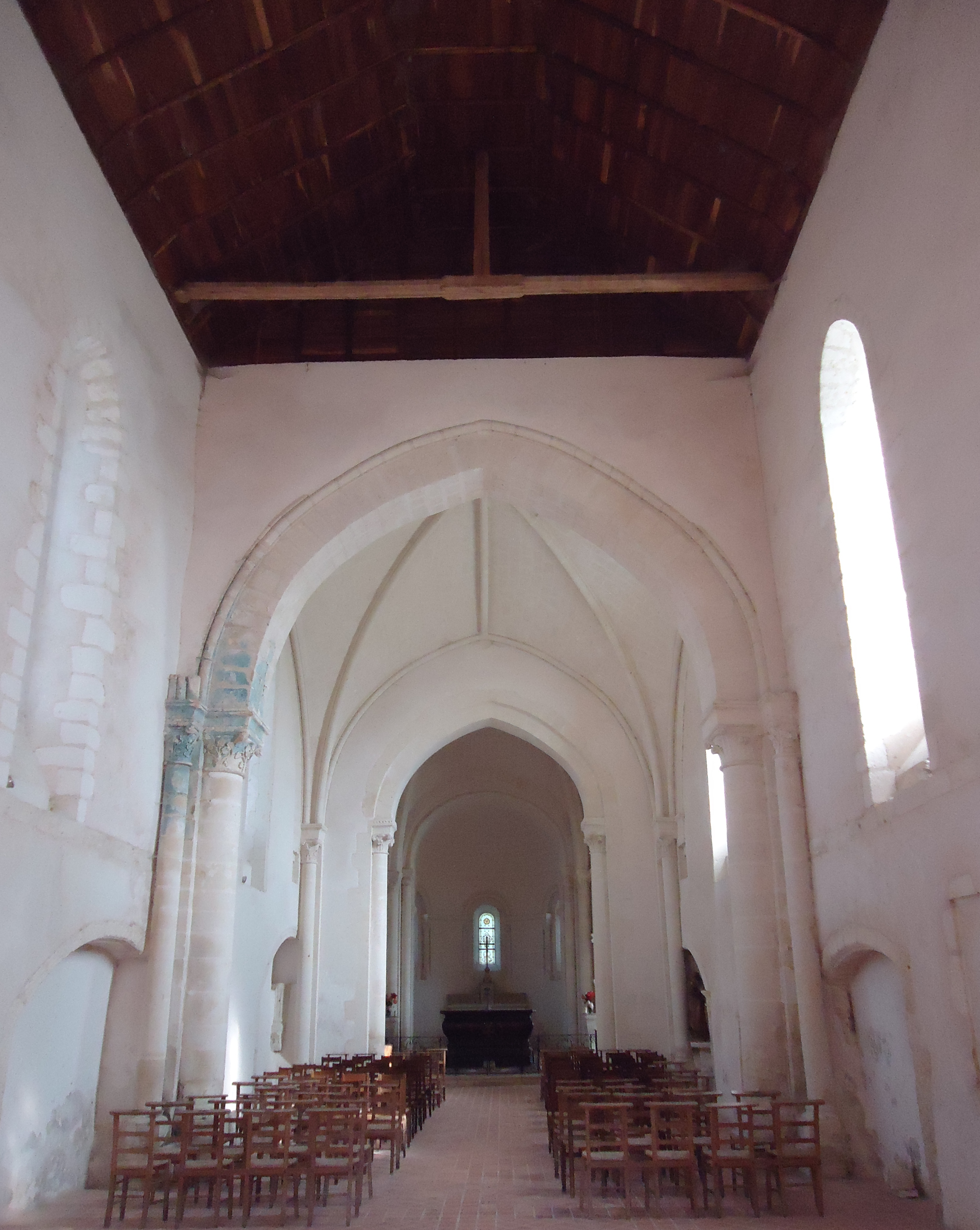
The nave

=== Furniture ===
The south chapel is the most richly decorated. In the south-west corner of this chapel is a funerary slab, classified as a monument historique in 1906. It comes from the tomb of Robin de Clermont, Seigneur de Gallerande, who died on February 2, 1339 and was buried in this church, where he founded a chapellenie. It is a rectangular limestone stone, 180 centimetres high, 70 centimetres wide and 22 centimetres deep. The figure of Robin de Clermont is engraved in the center: the lord is depicted standing, hands clasped, with medium-length hair and a short beard, dressed in armor and wearing a long sword on his belt. His family's coats of arms are depicted on either side of his face, while the background of the slab is adorned with plant motifs. An inscription engraved in capital letters appears around the edge of the stone.

Until the second half of the 20th century, the Pringé church housed a rich collection of statues, most of which were moved to the Saint-Martin church in Luché for safety reasons. This is the case for several works listed as historical monuments, such as a sculpted group known as the Education of the Virgin, in polychrome terracotta dating from the 17th century, and a wooden statue representing St. Julien, dating from the 15th century. A polychrome terracotta statue of the Virgin and Child from the first half of the 17th century was stolen in 1990. A polychrome walnut statue of Saint Scholastica, dating from the 18th century, remains in the church.

Monumental paintings from the 15th and 16th centuries adorn the walls of the south chapel, which belonged to the Lords of Gallerande. They were classified as historic monuments in 1976.

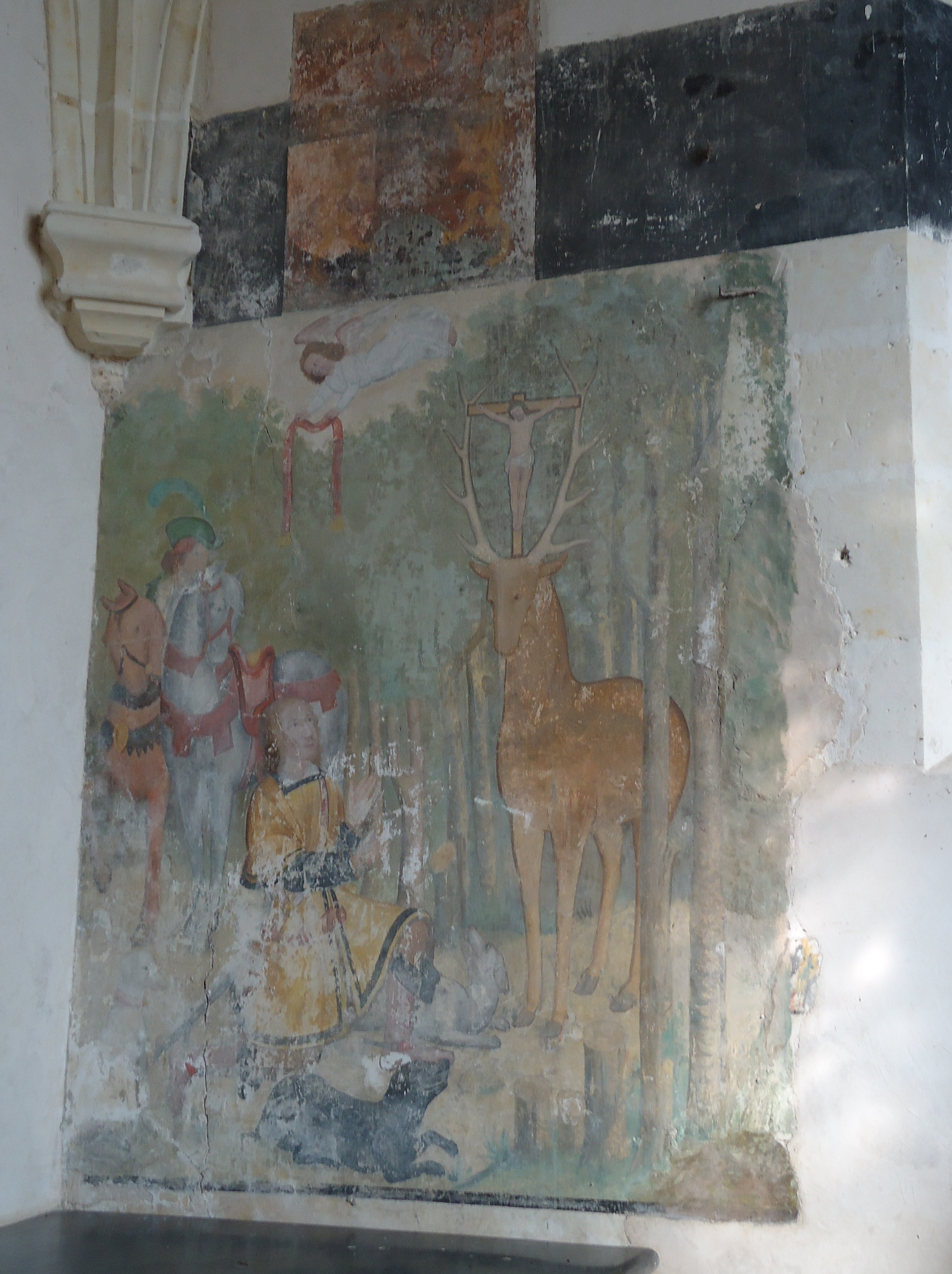
One of the monumental paintings.

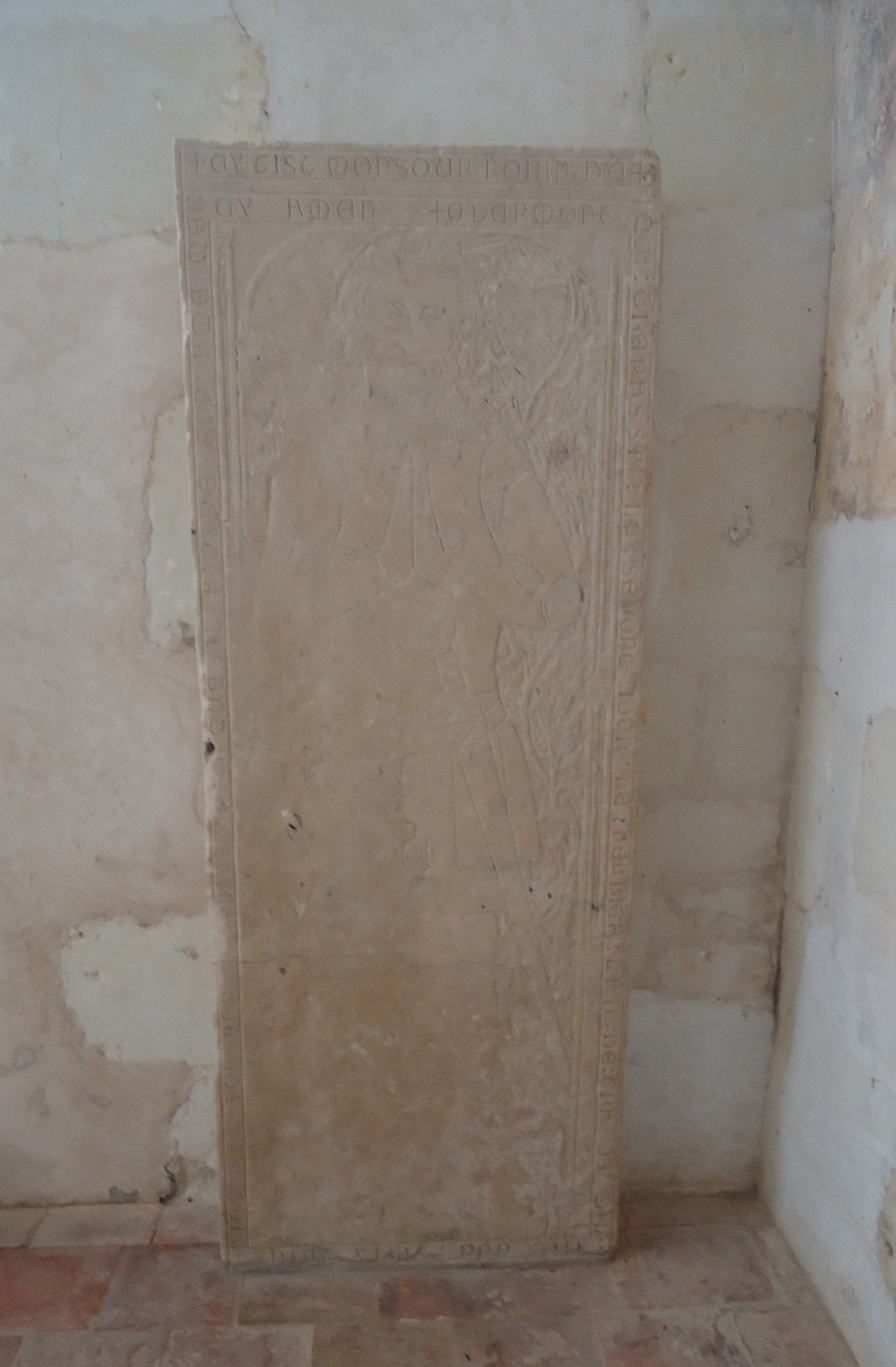
The funerary slab.

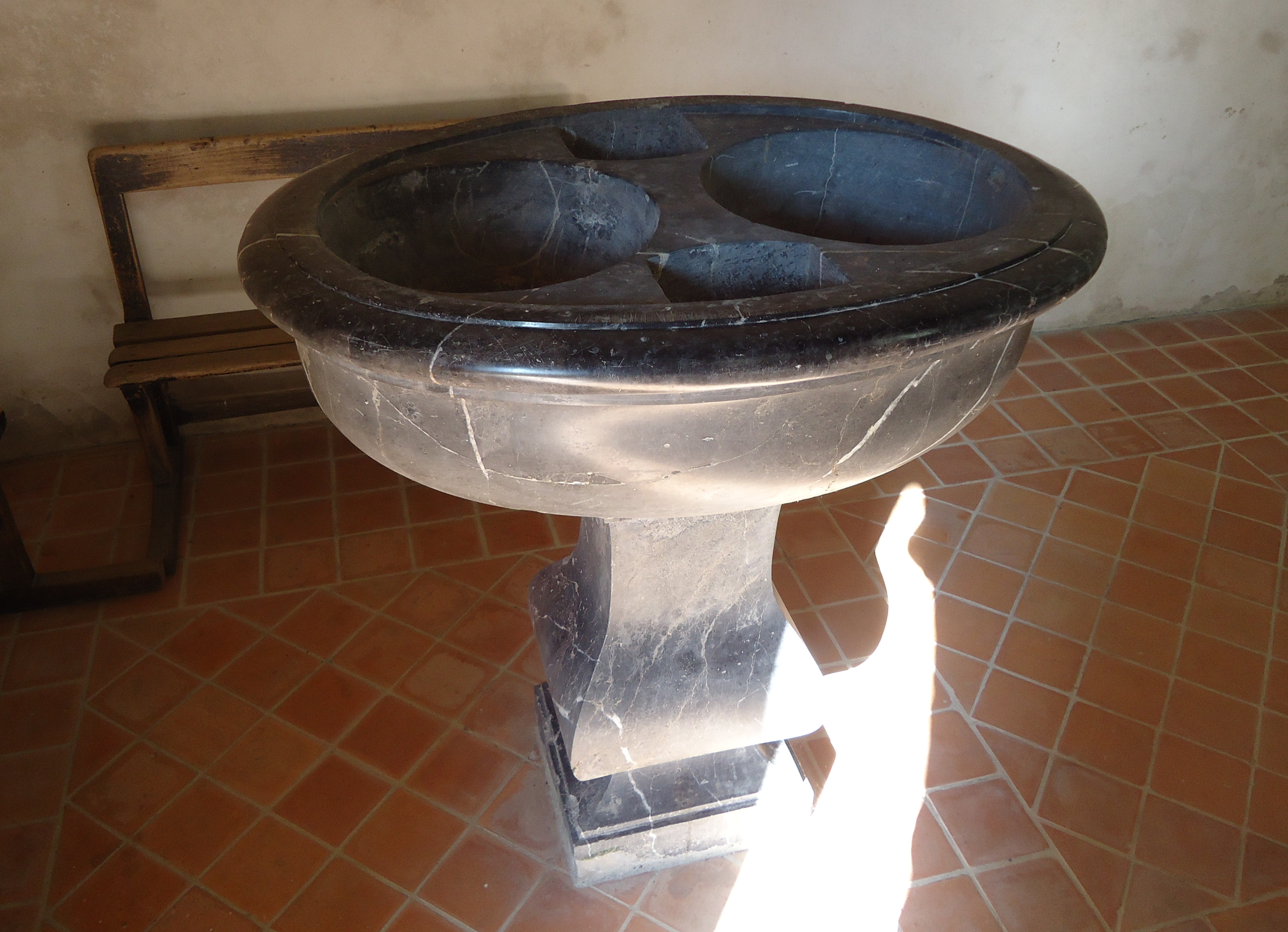
The baptismal font.

== See also ==
- Luché-Pringé
- Sarthe
- France

== Bibliography ==
- Le patrimoine des communes de la Sarthe. Flohic Éditions. 2000. ISBN 2-84234-106-6.
- Mousset-Pinard, Françoise; Toulier, Christine; Darrasse, Jean-Baptiste; Desvigne, Virgine (2015). Le Lude en Vallée du Loir. Nantes: Éditions 303. ISBN 979-10-93572-11-6.
