= Fulcuich =

French nobleman

Fulcuich (Fulcois) Count of Mortagne, son of Rotrou, Seigneur de Nogent. It has been conjectured that Fulcuich's ancestor was Hervé I, Lord of Mortagne-au-Perche, through his supposed mother, Hildegarde de Mortagne et Perche, wife of Rotrou, who is a known daughter of Hervé.

Fulcuich married Melisende, Viscountess of Châteaudun, daughter of Hugues, Viscount of Châteaudun, and Hildegarde of Perche. Fulcuich and Melisende had two children:

- Geoffrey II Viscount of Châteaudun, I Count of Perche.
- Hugues du Perche, ancestor in male line of the Plantagenets.

Fulcuich was presumably succeeded as count by his son Geoffrey.

== Male-line descendants ==
Male, male-line, legitimate, non-morganatic dynasts who either lived to adulthood, or who held a title as a child, are included.

- Fulk, Count of Mortagne
  - Geoffrey II, Viscount of Châteaudun, d. 1040
    - Hugh III, Viscount of Châteaudun, d. 1044
    - Rotrou I, Viscount of Châteaudun, c. 1031-1079
      - Geoffrey II, Count of Perche, d. 1100
        - Rotrou III, Count of Perche, c. 1080-1144
          - Rotrou IV, Count of Perche, 1135-1191
            - Geoffrey III, Count of Perche, d. 1202
              - Thomas, Count of Perche, 1195-1217
            - Stephen of Perche, d. 1205
            - Rotrou of Perche, Bishop of Chalons, d. 1201
            - William II, Count of Perche, d. 1226
          - Geoffrey, d. 1154
          - Stephen of Perche, 1138-1169
      - Hugh IV, Viscount of Châteaudun, d. 1110
        - Geoffrey III, Viscount of Châteaudun, d. 1145
          - Hugh V, Viscount of Châteaudun, d. 1180
            - Geoffrey IV, Viscount of Châteaudun, d. 1176
            - Hugh VI, Viscount of Châteaudun, d. 1191
              - Geoffrey V, Viscount of Châteaudun, d. 1218
                - Geoffrey VI, Viscount of Châteaudun, d. 1250
                - Stephen
                - Reynold
            - Payen, Lord of Mondoubleau, d. 1190 or after
          - Hubert Payen, d. after 1145
          - William
        - Fulk
      - Rotrou of Châteaudun, Lord of Montfort-le-Rotrou, d. after 1110
      - Fulk of Châteaudun, d. after 1078
  - Hugh of Perche
    - Geoffrey II, Count of Gâtinais, d. 1043
      - Geoffrey III, Count of Anjou, 1040-1096
      - Fulk IV, Count of Anjou, 1043-1109
        - Geoffrey IV, Count of Anjou, 1070-1106
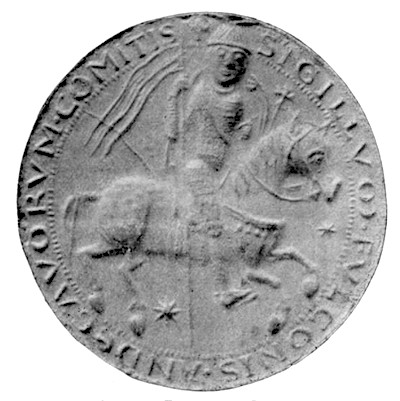
        - Fulk, King of Jerusalem, 1089-1143, ancestor in male line of the Plantagenets
          Fulk, King of Jerusalem, 1089-1143
          - Geoffrey Plantagenet, Count of Anjou, 1113-1151
            - Henry II of England, 1133–1189
              - Henry the Young King, 1155–1183
              - Richard I of England, 1157–1199
              - Geoffrey, Duke of Brittany, 1158–1186
                - Arthur I, Duke of Brittany, 1187–1203
              - John of England, 1167–1216
                - Henry III of England, 1207–1272
                  - Edward I of England, 1239–1307
                    - Edward II of England, 1284–1327
                      - Edward III of England, 1312–1377
                        - Edward, the Black Prince, 1330–1376
                          - Richard II of England, 1367–1400
                        - Lionel of Antwerp, 1st Duke of Clarence, 1338–1368
                        - John of Gaunt, 1st Duke of Lancaster, 1340–1399
                          - Henry IV of England, 1366–1413
                            - Henry V of England, 1386–1422
                              - Henry VI of England, 1421–1471
                                - Edward of Westminster, 1453–1471
                            - Thomas, Duke of Clarence, 1387–1421
                            - John, Duke of Bedford, 1389–1435
                            - Humphrey, Duke of Gloucester, 1390–1447
                        - Edmund of Langley, 1st Duke of York, 1341–1402
                          - Edward of Norwich, 2nd Duke of York, 1373–1415
                          - Richard of Conisburgh, 3rd Earl of Cambridge, 1375–1415
                            - Richard Plantagenet, 3rd Duke of York, 1411–1460
                              - Edward IV of England, 1442–1483
                                - Edward V of England, 1470–?
                                - Richard of Shrewsbury, 1st Duke of York, 1473–?
                              - Edmund, Earl of Rutland, 1443–1460
                              - George Plantagenet, 1st Duke of Clarence, 1449–1478
                                - Edward Plantagenet, 17th Earl of Warwick, 1475–1499, the last legitimate male-line Plantagenet
                              - Richard III of England, 1452–1485
                        - Thomas of Woodstock, 1st Duke of Gloucester, 1355–1397
                          - Humphrey, 2nd Earl of Buckingham, 1381–1399
                      - John of Eltham, Earl of Cornwall, 1316–1336
                    - Thomas of Brotherton, 1st Earl of Norfolk, 1300–1338
                      - Edward of Norfolk, 1313-1334
                    - Edmund of Woodstock, 1st Earl of Kent, 1301–1330
                      - Edmund, 2nd Earl of Kent, 1326-1331
                      - John, 3rd Earl of Kent, 1330–1352
                  - Edmund Crouchback, 1st Earl of Lancaster, 1245–1296
                    - Thomas Plantagenet, 2nd Earl of Lancaster, 1278–1322
                    - Henry, 3rd Earl of Lancaster, 1281–1345
                      - Henry of Grosmont, 1st Duke of Lancaster, 1310–1361
                    - John of Beaufort, Lord of Beaufort, 1286–1317
                - Richard, 1st Earl of Cornwall, 1209–1272
                  - Henry of Almain, 1235–1271
                  - Edmund, 2nd Earl of Cornwall, 1249–1300
            - Geoffrey, Count of Nantes, 1134-1158
            - William FitzEmpress, 1136-1164
          - Elias II, Count of Maine, d. 1151
          - Baldwin III of Jerusalem, 1130-1163
          - Amalric of Jerusalem, 1136-1174
            - Baldwin IV of Jerusalem, 1161-1185
    - Liétaud, Lord of Yèvres, d. 1050

== Sources ==
- Kerrebrouck, Patrick van, Nouvelle histoire généalogique de l'auguste maison de France, vol. 1: La Préhistoire des Capétiens. 1993.
- Reuter, Timothy (Editor), The New Cambridge Medieval History, Volume III, 900-1024, Cambridge University Press, 1999
- Weir, Alison (2008). Katherine Swynford: the story of John of Gaunt and his scandalous duchess. London: McClelland & Stewart. ISBN 9780771088575.
