= Counts and viscounts of Châteaudun =

Châteaudun coat of arms

The County of Châteaudun was held in the 9th century by counts who also held the County of Blois. Theobald I created the first viscount of Châteaudun with the appointment of Geoffrey I, founder of the House of Châteaudun. The viscounts were entrusted with the government of the county of Châteaudun, records of whom are continuous from the mid-10th century. The actual rule of Châteaudun between the late 9th and the mid-10th centuries, and the relationships between the count and viscounts, is uncertain. The county was revived in 1439 when the region was recreated as the County of Dunois and granted to Jean de Dunois, the illegitimate son of Louis I, Duke of Orléans, son of Charles V of France.

Châteaudun is closely associated with the County of Perche and the early rulers generally held both titles of viscount of Châteaudun and count of Perche. There are also close ties between these counts and the counts of Anjou, and members of the House of Ingelger and House of Plantagenet descended from this line. The family tree of the House of Châteaudun is most illustrative of these relationships. The following lineage shows the counts of Châteaudun, the viscounts of Châteaudun, and the related counts of Perche and Anjou. Dates shown are the approximate dates of rule.

Counts of Châteaudun

The following are the known counts of Châteaudun:

- William (through 834), also count of Blois, reportedly killed by Hastein, Viking chieftain and compatriot of Björn Ironside, son of Ragnar Lothbrok.
- Odo I (834–871), brother of Robert the Strong (count of Anjou), also count of Troyes, Anjou and Blois.
- Odo II (871–886), son of the previous, also count of Troyes
- Robert I (through 886), son of the previous, also count of Troyes
- Adalelm (886–894), nephew of the previous, also count of Troyes.

The period between Adalelm and Theobald is uncertain, but may have been filled by Counts Warnelad and Gello.

- Theobald the Trickster (through 975), also count of Blois and Chartres
- Odo I (975–996), son of the previous, also count of Blois and Chartres
- Theobald II (996–1004), son of the previous and stepson of Robert the Pious, also count of Blois and Chartres
- Odo II (1004–1037), brother of the previous, also count of Troyes, Blois, Chartres, Beauvais and Tours.

Viscounts of Châteaudun

The position of viscount of Châteaudun was created by Theobald I in 967. As noted above many of the early viscounts of Châteaudun were also counts of Perche and this particular family was also known as The Geoffrides.

- Geoffrey I (967–985), viscount of Châteaudun
- Hugh I (985–989), viscount of Châteaudun, son of the previous
- Hildegarde (989–1022), viscountess of Châteaudun, wife of the previous
- Hugh II (1022–1026), viscount of Châteaudun and archbishop of Tours, son of the previous
- Melisende (1026–1030), viscountess of Châteaudun, sister of the previous
- Geoffrey II (1030–1039), viscount of Châteaudun and count of Perche, son of the previous
- Hugh III (1039–1044), viscount of Châteaudun and count of Perche, son of the previous
- Rotrou I (1044–1080), viscount of Châteaudun and count of Perche, brother of the previous
- Hugues IV (1080–1110), viscount of Châteaudun, son of the previous
- Geoffrey III (1110–1145), viscount of Châteaudun, son of the previous
- Hugh V (1145–1176), viscount of Châteaudun, son of the previous
- Geoffrey IV (1176), viscount of Châteaudun, son of the previous
- Hugh VI (1176–1191), viscount of Châteaudun, brother of the previous
- Geoffrey V (1191–1218), viscount of Châteaudun, son of the previous
- Geoffrey VI (1218–1250), viscount of Châteaudun, son of the previous
- Clemence (1250–1259), viscountess of Châteaudun, daughter of the previous.

The line of viscounts of Châteaudun ended with the rule of Clemence.

Counts of Perche that were descendants of Geoffrey I of Châteaudun

The lines of viscounts of Châteaudun and counts of Perche diverged in 1080 with Geoffrey II. The counts of Perche that were from the House of Châteaudun were:

- Geoffrey II (1080–1100), count of Perche and Mortagne, son of Rotrou I of Châteaudun
- Rotrou III (1100–1144), count of Perche and Mortagne, son of the previous
- Rotrou IV (1144–1191), count of Perche, son of the previous
- Geoffrey III (1191–1202), count of Perche, son of the previous
- Thomas (1202–1217), count of Perche, son of the previous
- William II (1217–1226), count of Perche, also bishop of Châlons, brother of Geoffrey III

Counts of Anjou that were descendants of Geoffrey I of Châteaudun

As noted above, the viscounts of Châteaudun were closely related to the counts of Anjou. The direct descendants of the founder of the House of Châteaudun include:

- Hugh, son of Melisende, Viscountess of Châteaudun, and Fulcois, Count of Montagne
- Geoffrey II of Gâtinais, son of the previous
- Geoffrey III of Anjou, son of the previous
- Fulk IV of Anjou, brother of the previous
- Fulk V of Anjou, son of the previous.

The line of viscounts of Châteaudun became extinct in 1249, with the death Geoffrey VI of Châteaudun. The lineage of the counts of Perche, extinct by 1217, ending with Thomas. The lineage of the counts of Anjou, who acquired the land by the marriage of a grandson of Fulcois, Geoffrey II of Gâtinais, with Ermengarde of Anjou, heiress of the House of Ingelger, continued on to modern times. Their great-grandson in agnatic line was Geoffrey V of Anjou. The House of Plantagenet descended from this line.

== Sources ==
- Nelson, Janet L., The Annals of St-Bertin, Manchester University Press, 1991
- Phalle, Édouard de Saint, Comtes de Troyes et de Poitiers au IXe siècle: histoire d’un double échec. In Christian Settipani and Katharine S. B. Keats-Rohan, Onomastique et Parenté dans l'Occident médiéval. 2000.
- Kerrebrouck, Patrick van., Nouvelle histoire généalogique de l'auguste maison de France, vol. 1: La Préhistoire des Capétiens. 1993.
- Tout, Thomas Frederick, The Empire and the Papacy: 918-1273, Periods of European History, London: Rivingtons, 1906
- Bachrach, Bernard S, Fulk Nerra, The Neo-Roman Consul, 987-1040: A Political Biography of the Angevin Count, University of California Press, 1993
- Bury, J. B. (Editor), The Cambridge Medieval History, Volume III, Germany and the Western Empire, Cambridge University Press, 1922
- Bury, J. B. (Editor), The Cambridge Medieval History, Volume V, Contest of Empire and Papacy, Cambridge University Press, 1926
- Reuter, Timothy (Editor), The New Cambridge Medieval History, Volume III, 900-1024, Cambridge University Press, 1999
- Runciman, Steven, A History of the Crusades, Volume Two, The Kingdom of Jerusalem and the Frankish East, 1100-1187, Cambridge University Press, 1952
- Oman, Charles, Periods of European History, Volume I: The Dark Ages, 476-918, Rivingtons, London, 1928
- Tout, T. F., Periods of European History, Volume II: The Empire and the Papacy, 918-1273, Rivingtons, London, 1932
