= Geoffrey II =

Geoffrey II may refer to:

- Geoffrey II, Viscount of Châteaudun (died 1040)
- Geoffrey II (archbishop of Bordeaux) (died 1043)
- Geoffrey II, Count of Gâtinais (died 1043/6)
- Geoffrey II of Thouars (990-1055)
- Geoffrey II, Count of Anjou (died 1060), surnamed Martel, Count of Anjou from 1040
- Geoffrey II of Provence, (died 1067), first count of Forcalquier from 1062
- Geoffrey II, Count of Perche (died 1100)
- Geoffrey II of Vendôme (died 1102), lord of Preuilly from 1067
- Geoffrey II, Duke of Brittany (1158–1186), Duke of Brittany from 1181
- Geoffrey II of Villehardouin (c. 1195-1246), Prince of Achaea from c. 1229
- Geoffrey II of Briel (fl. late 13th century)
