= Angevin kings of England =

12th–13th century English royal house of French origin

Angevins
- Arms adopted in 1198
- Parent house: House of Châteaudun
- Country: England; (Kingdom of France) France; (Lordship of Ireland) Ireland
- Founder: Henry II of England
- Current head: Extinct
- Final ruler: John of England
- Titles: King of England; Lord of Ireland; Duke of Aquitaine; Duke of Brittany; Duke of Normandy; Count of Anjou; Count of Gâtinais; Count of Maine; Count of Touraine; Count of Mortain
- Cadet branches: House of Plantagenet

The Angevins (/ˈændʒɪvɪnz/; "of/from Anjou") were a royal house of French origin that ruled England, Ireland and parts of France in the 12th and early 13th centuries; its monarchs were Henry II, Richard I and John. Henry II won control of a vast assemblage of lands in western Europe that would last for 80 years and would retrospectively be referred to as the Angevin Empire. As a political entity this was structurally different from the preceding Norman and subsequent Plantagenet realms. Geoffrey of Anjou became Duke of Normandy in 1144 and died in 1151. In 1152, his heir, Henry, added Aquitaine by virtue of his marriage to Eleanor of Aquitaine. Henry also inherited the claim of his mother, Empress Matilda, the daughter of King Henry I of England and Matilda of Scotland (who was also the remaining descendant of the royal House of Wessex), to the English throne, to which Henry II succeeded in 1154 following the death of Matilda's cousin Stephen.

In 1189, Henry was succeeded by his third son, Richard, whose reputation for martial prowess won him the epithet "Cœur de Lion" or "Lionheart". He was born and raised in England but spent very little time there during his adult life, perhaps as little as six months. Despite this Richard remains an enduring iconic figure both in England and in France, and is one of very few kings of England remembered by his nickname as opposed to regnal number.

When Richard died, his brother John – Henry's fifth and last surviving son – took the throne. In 1204, John lost many of the Angevins' continental territories, including Anjou, to the French crown. He and his successors were still recognized as dukes of Aquitaine. The loss of Anjou, for which the dynasty is named, and other French fiefs made John the last of the Angevin kings of England. However, there is no agreement among historians. Some make no distinction between Angevins and Plantagenets while considering Henry II as the first Plantagenet king. From John, the dynasty continued on the throne of England and unbroken in the senior male line until the reign of Richard II before dividing into two competing cadet branches, the House of Lancaster and the House of York. In the 17th century, historians would use the term "Plantagenet" when describing the house.

== Terminology ==
=== Angevin ===
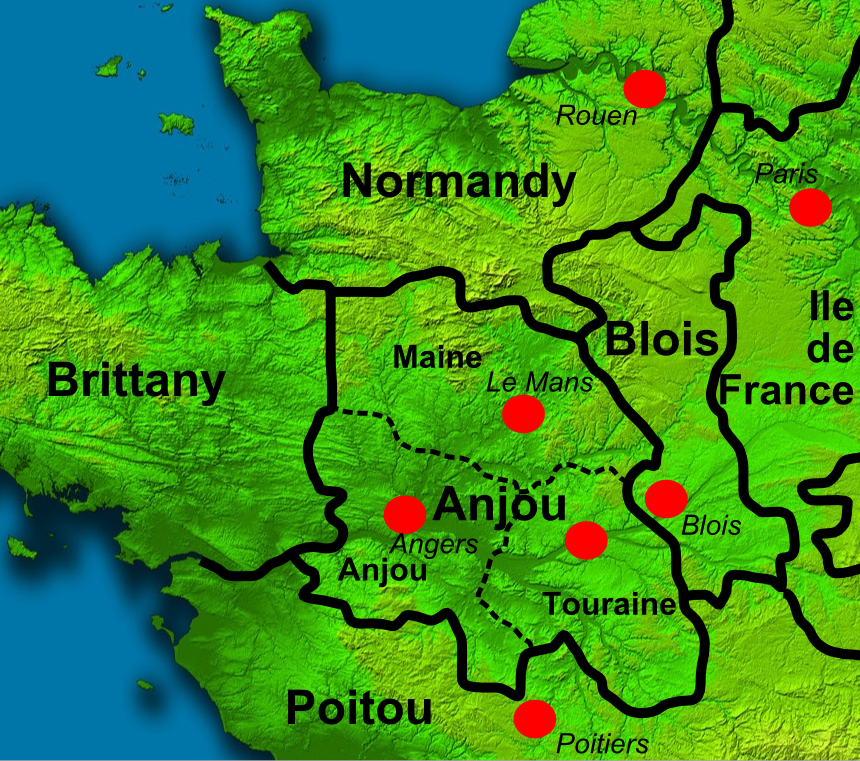
Northern France around the County of Anjou; red circles mark regional urban centres

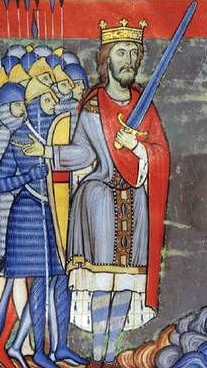
Henry II (1154–1189) is considered by some to be the first Plantagenet king of England.

The adjective Angevin is especially used in English history to refer to the kings who were also counts of Anjou—beginning with Henry II—descended from Geoffrey and Matilda; their characteristics, descendants and the period of history which they covered from the mid-twelfth to early-thirteenth centuries. In addition, it is also used pertaining to Anjou, or any sovereign, government derived from this. As a noun, it is used for any native of Anjou or Angevin ruler. As such, Angevin is also used for other counts and dukes of Anjou; including the three kings' ancestors, their cousins who held the crown of Jerusalem and unrelated later members of the French royal family who were granted the titles to form different dynasties amongst which were the Capetian House of Anjou and the Valois House of Anjou.

=== Plantagenet ===
Richard of York, 3rd Duke of York, adopted Plantagenet as his family name in the 15th century. Plantegenest (or Plante Genest) had been a 12th-century nickname for his ancestor Geoffrey, Count of Anjou and Duke of Normandy. One of many popular theories suggests the blossom of common broom, a bright yellow ("gold") flowering plant, genista in medieval Latin, as the source of the nickname.

It is uncertain why Richard chose this specific name, although, during the Wars of the Roses, it emphasised Richard's status as Geoffrey's patrilineal descendant. The retrospective usage of the name for all of Geoffrey's male-line descendants was popular during the subsequent Tudor dynasty, perhaps encouraged by the further legitimacy it gave to Richard's great-grandson, Henry VIII. In the late 17th century, this name passed into common usage among historians.

== Origins ==
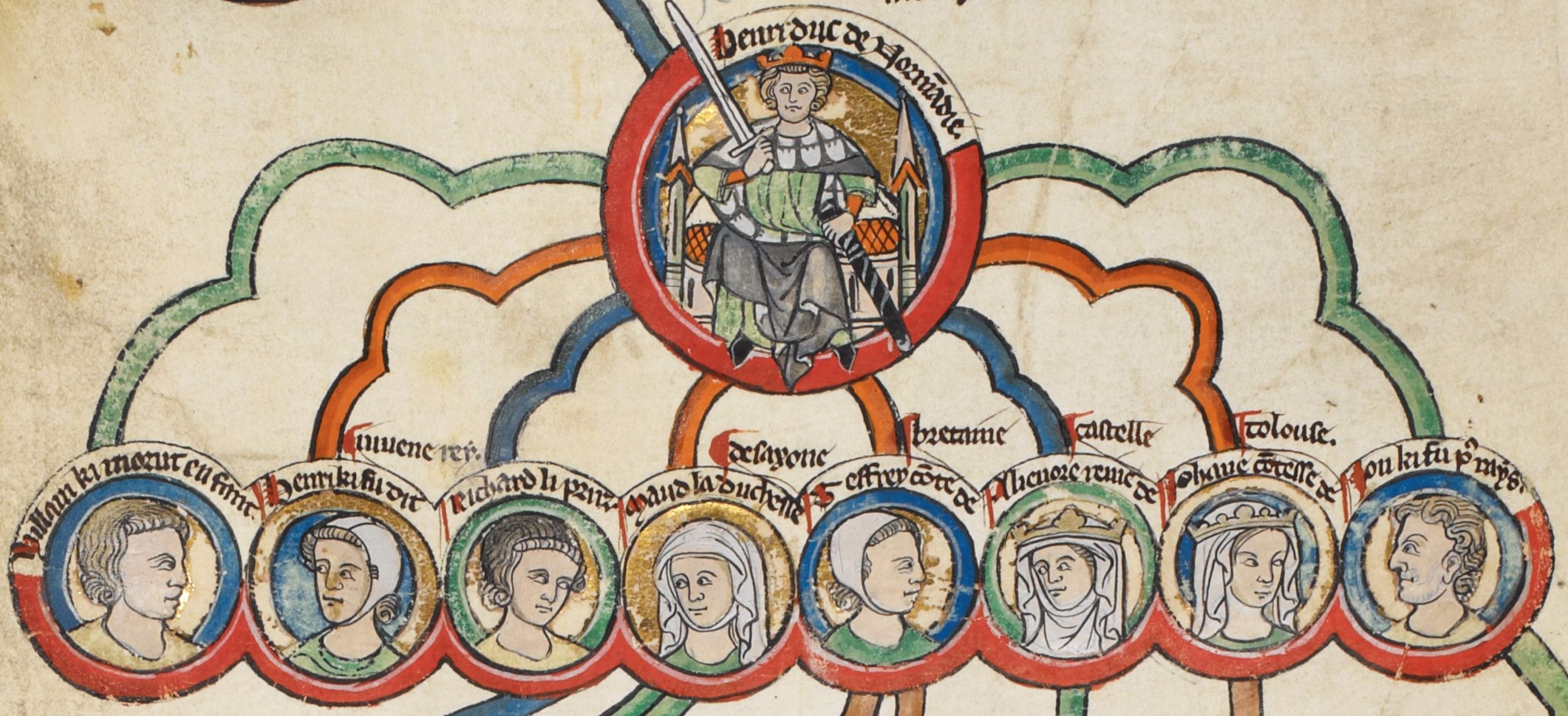
Thirteenth-century depiction of the Angevins (Henry II and his legitimate children): (left to right) William, Henry, Richard, Matilda, Geoffrey, Eleanor, Joan and John

The Angevins descend from Geoffrey II, Count of Gâtinais and Ermengarde of Anjou. In 1060 this couple inherited, via cognatic kinship, the county of Anjou from an older line dating from 870 and a noble called Ingelger. The marriage of their great-grandson, Geoffrey V, Count of Anjou to Matilda, the only surviving legitimate child of Henry I of England, was part of a struggle for power during the tenth and eleventh centuries among the lords of Normandy, Brittany, Poitou, Blois, Maine and the kings of France. It was from this marriage that Geoffrey's son, Henry, inherited the claims to England, Normandy and Anjou that marks the beginning of the Angevin and Plantagenet dynasties. This was the third attempt by Geoffrey's father Fulk V to build a political alliance with Normandy. The first was by marrying his daughter Matilda to Henry's heir William Adelin, who drowned in the wreck of the White Ship. Fulk then married his daughter Sibylla to William Clito, heir to Henry's older brother Robert Curthose, but Henry had the marriage annulled to avoid strengthening William's rival claim to his lands.

== Inheritance custom and Angevin practice ==
As society became more prosperous and stable in the 11th century, inheritance customs developed that allowed daughters (in the absence of sons) to succeed to principalities as well as landed estates. The twelfth-century chronicler Ralph de Diceto noted that the counts of Anjou extended their dominion over their neighbours by marriage rather than conquest. The marriage of Geoffrey to the daughter of a king (and widow of an emperor) occurred in this context. It is unknown whether King Henry intended to make Geoffrey his heir, but it is known that the threat presented by William Clito's rival claim to the duchy of Normandy made his negotiating position very weak. Even so, it is probable that, should the marriage be childless, King Henry would have attempted to be succeeded by one of his Norman kinsmen such as Theobald II, Count of Champagne, or Stephen of Blois, who in the event did seize King Henry's English crown. King Henry's great relief in 1133 at the birth of a son to the couple, described as "the heir to the Kingdom", is understandable in the light of this situation. Following this, the birth of a second son raised the question of whether custom would be followed with the maternal inheritance passing to first born and the paternal inheritance going to his brother, Geoffrey.

According to William of Newburgh, writing in the 1190s, the plan failed because of Geoffrey's early death in 1151. The dying Geoffrey decided that Henry would have the paternal and maternal inheritances while he needed the resources to overcome Stephen, and left instructions that his body would not be buried until Henry swore an oath that, once England and Normandy were secured, the younger Geoffrey would have Anjou. Henry's brother Geoffrey died in 1158, too soon to receive Anjou, but not before being installed count in Nantes after Henry aided a rebellion by its citizens against their previous lord.

The unity of Henry's assemblage of domains was largely dependent on the ruling family, influencing the opinion of most historians that this instability made it unlikely to endure. The French custom of partible inheritance at the time would lead to political fragmentation. Indeed, if Henry II's sons Henry the Young King and Geoffrey of Brittany had not died young, the inheritance of 1189 would have been fundamentally altered. Henry and Richard both planned for partition on their deaths while attempting to provide overriding sovereignty to hold the lands together. For example, in 1173 and 1183, Henry tried to force Richard to acknowledge allegiance to his older brother for the duchy of Aquitaine, and later Richard would confiscate Ireland from John. This was complicated by the Angevins being subjects of the kings of France, who felt these feudal rights of homage and the right of allegiance more legally belonged to them. This was particularly true when the wardship of Geoffrey's son Arthur and lordship of Brittany was contended between 1202 and 1204. Upon the Young King's death in 1183, Richard became heir in chief, but refused to give up Aquitaine to give John an inheritance. More by accident than design this meant that, while Richard inherited the patrimony, John would become lord of Ireland and Arthur would be duke of Brittany. By the mid-thirteenth century, there was a clear unified patrimony and Plantagenet empire but this cannot be called an Angevin Empire as by this date Anjou and most of the continental lands had been lost.

== Arrival in England ==
Henry's continental holdings in 1154, showing the lands known as the Angevin Empire in shades of red.

Henry I of England named his daughter Matilda heir; but when he died in 1135 Matilda was far from England in Anjou or Maine, while her cousin Stephen was closer in Boulogne, giving him the advantage he needed to race to England and have himself crowned and anointed king of England. Matilda's husband Geoffrey, though he had little interest in England, commenced a long struggle for the duchy of Normandy. To create a second front, Matilda landed in England during 1139 to challenge Stephen, beginning the civil war known as the Anarchy. In 1141, she captured Stephen at the battle of Lincoln, prompting the collapse of his support. While Geoffrey pushed on with the conquest of Normandy over the next four years, Matilda threw away her position through arrogance and inability to be magnanimous in victory. She was even forced to release Stephen in a hostage exchange for her half-brother Robert, 1st Earl of Gloucester, allowing Stephen to resume control of much of England. Geoffrey never visited England to offer practical assistance, but instead sent Henry as a male figurehead—beginning in 1142 when Henry was only 9—with a view that if England was conquered it would be Henry that would become king. In 1150, Geoffrey also transferred the title of Duke of Normandy to Henry but retained the dominant role in governance. Three fortuitous events allowed Henry to finally bring the conflict to a successful conclusion:

- In 1151, Count Geoffrey died before having time to complete his plan to divide his inheritance between his sons Henry and Geoffrey, who would have received England and Anjou respectively.
- Louis VII of France divorced Eleanor of Aquitaine whom Henry quickly married, greatly increasing his resources and power with the acquisition of Duchy of Aquitaine.
- In 1153, Stephen's son Eustace died. The disheartened Stephen, who had also recently been widowed, gave up the fight and, with the Treaty of Wallingford, repeated the peace offer that Matilda had rejected in 1142: Stephen would be king for life, Henry his successor, preserving Stephen's second son William's rights to his family estates. Stephen did not live long and so Henry inherited in late 1154.

Henry faced many challenges to secure possession of his father's and grandfathers' lands that required the reassertion and extension of old suzerainties. In 1162 Theobald, Archbishop of Canterbury, died, and Henry saw an opportunity to re-establish what he saw as his rights over the church in England by appointing his friend Thomas Becket to succeed him. Instead, Becket proved to be an inept politician whose defiance alienated the king and his counsellors. Henry and Becket clashed repeatedly: over church tenures, Henry's brother's marriage and taxation. Henry reacted by getting Becket, and other members of the English episcopate, to recognise sixteen ancient customs—governing relations between the king, his courts, and the church—in writing for the first time in the Constitutions of Clarendon. When Becket tried to leave the country without permission, Henry attempted to ruin him by laying a number of suits relating to Becket's time as chancellor. In response Becket fled into exile for five years. Relations later improved, allowing Becket's return, but soured again when Becket saw the coronation of Henry's son as coregent by the Archbishop of York as a challenge to his authority and excommunicated those who had offended him. When he heard the news, Henry said: "What miserable drones and traitors have I nurtured and promoted in my household who let their lord be treated with such shameful contempt by a low-born clerk." Three of Henry's men killed Becket in Canterbury Cathedral after Becket resisted a botched attempt to arrest him. Within Christian Europe Henry was widely considered complicit in Becket's death. The opinion of this transgression against the church made Henry a pariah, so in penance he walked barefoot into Canterbury Cathedral where he was scourged by monks.

In 1171, Henry invaded Ireland to assert his overlordship following alarm at the success of knights that he had allowed to recruit soldiers in England and Wales, who had assumed the role of colonisers and accrued autonomous power, including Strongbow. Pope Adrian IV had given Henry a papal blessing to expand his power into Ireland to reform the Irish church. Originally, this would have allowed some territory to be granted to Henry's brother, William, but other matters had distracted Henry and William was now dead. Instead, Henry's designs were made plain when he gave the lordship of Ireland to his youngest son, John.

In 1172, Henry II tried to give his landless youngest son John a wedding gift of the three castles of Chinon, Loudun and Mirebeau. This angered the 18-year-old Young King, who had yet to receive any lands from his father, and prompted a rebellion by Henry II's wife and three eldest sons. Louis VII supported the rebellion to destabilise Henry II. William the Lion and other subjects of Henry II also joined the revolt and it took 18 months for Henry to force the rebels to submit to his authority. In Le Mans in 1182, Henry II gathered his children to plan a partible inheritance in which his eldest son (also called Henry) would inherit England, Normandy and Anjou; Richard the Duchy of Aquitaine; Geoffrey Brittany, and John Ireland. This degenerated into further conflict. The younger Henry rebelled again before he died of dysentery and, in 1186, Geoffrey died after a tournament accident. In 1189, Richard and Philip II of France took advantage of Henry's failing health and forced him to accept humiliating peace terms, including naming Richard as his sole heir. Two days later, the old king died, defeated and miserable in the knowledge that even his favoured son John had rebelled. This fate was seen as the price he paid for the murder of Beckett.

== Decline ==
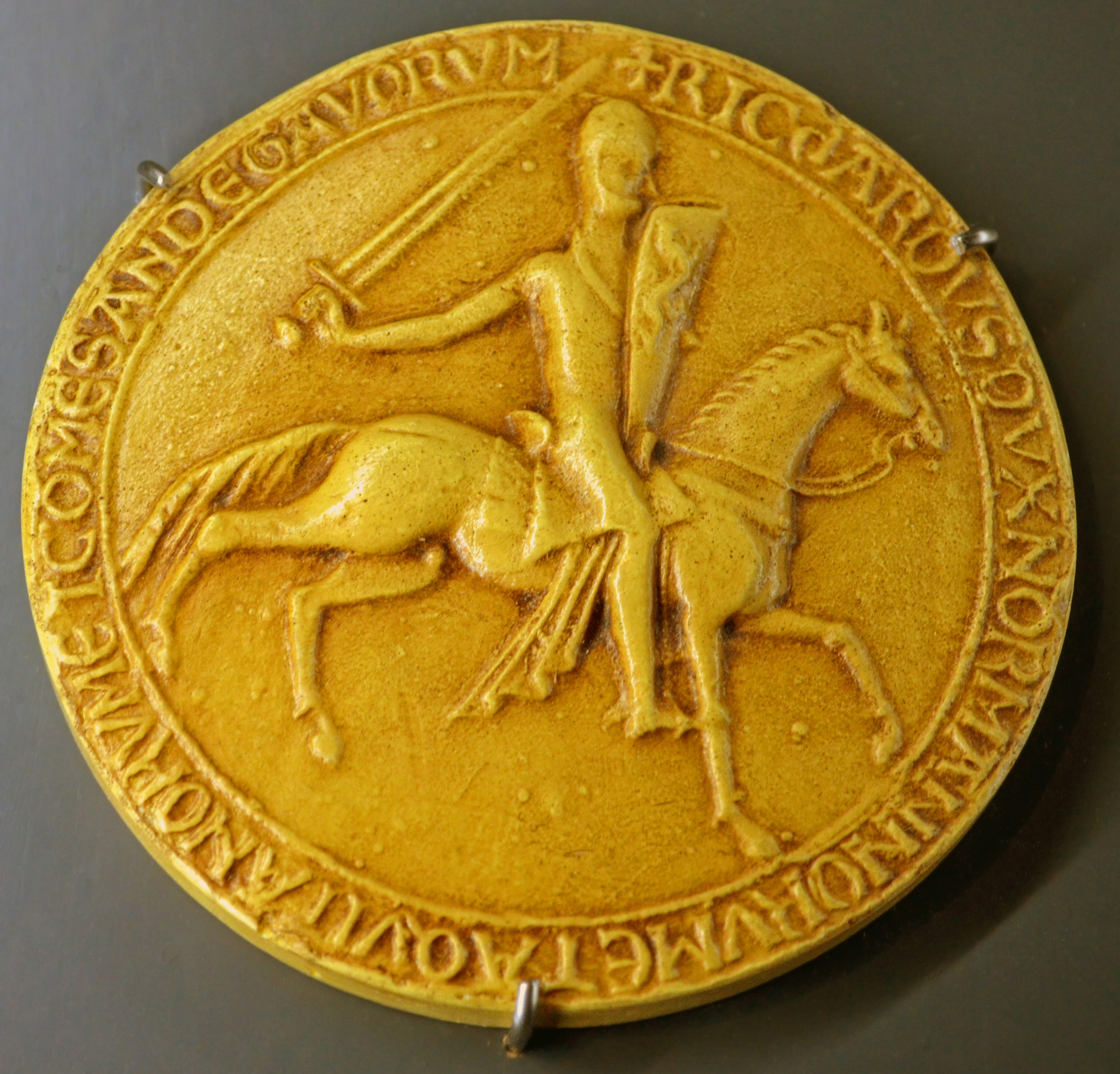
King Richard I's Great Seal of 1189. Exhibited in History Museum of Vendee.

On the day of Richard's English coronation, there was a mass slaughter of Jews, described by Richard of Devizes as a "holocaust". After his coronation, Richard put the Angevin Empire's affairs in order before joining the Third Crusade to the Middle East in early 1190. Opinions of Richard by his contemporaries varied. He had rejected and humiliated the king of France's sister; deposed the king of Cyprus and sold the island; insulted and refused to give spoils from the Third Crusade to Leopold V, Duke of Austria, and allegedly arranged the assassination of Conrad of Montferrat. His cruelty was exemplified by the massacre of 2,600 prisoners in Acre. However, Richard was respected for his military leadership and courtly manners. Despite victories in the Third Crusade he failed to capture Jerusalem, retreating from the Holy Land with a small band of followers.

Richard was captured by Leopold on his return journey. He was transferred to Henry VI, Holy Roman Emperor, and a 25-percent tax on goods and income was required to pay his 150,000-mark ransom. Philip II of France had overrun Normandy, while John of England controlled much of Richard's remaining lands. However, when Richard returned to England he forgave John and re-established his control. Leaving England permanently in 1194, Richard fought Philip for five years for the return of holdings seized during his incarceration. On the brink of victory, he was wounded by an arrow during the siege of Château de Châlus-Chabrol and died ten days later.

His failure to produce an heir caused a succession crisis. Anjou, Brittany, Maine and Touraine chose Richard's nephew Arthur as heir, while John succeeded in England and Normandy. Philip II of France again destabilised the Plantagenet territories on the European mainland, supporting his vassal Arthur's claim to the English crown. Eleanor supported her son John, who was victorious at the Battle of Mirebeau and captured the rebel leadership.

Arthur was murdered (allegedly by John), and his sister Eleanor would spend the rest of her life in captivity. John's behaviour drove a number of French barons to side with Philip, and the resulting rebellions by Norman and Angevin barons ended John's control of his continental possessions—the de facto end of the Angevin Empire, although Henry III would maintain his claim until 1259.

After re-establishing his authority in England, John planned to retake Normandy and Anjou by drawing the French from Paris while another army (under Otto IV, Holy Roman Emperor) attacked from the north. However, his allies were defeated at the Battle of Bouvines in one of the most decisive battles in French history. John's nephew Otto retreated and was soon overthrown, with John agreeing to a five-year truce. Philip's victory was crucial to the political order in England and France, and the battle was instrumental in establishing absolute monarchy in France.

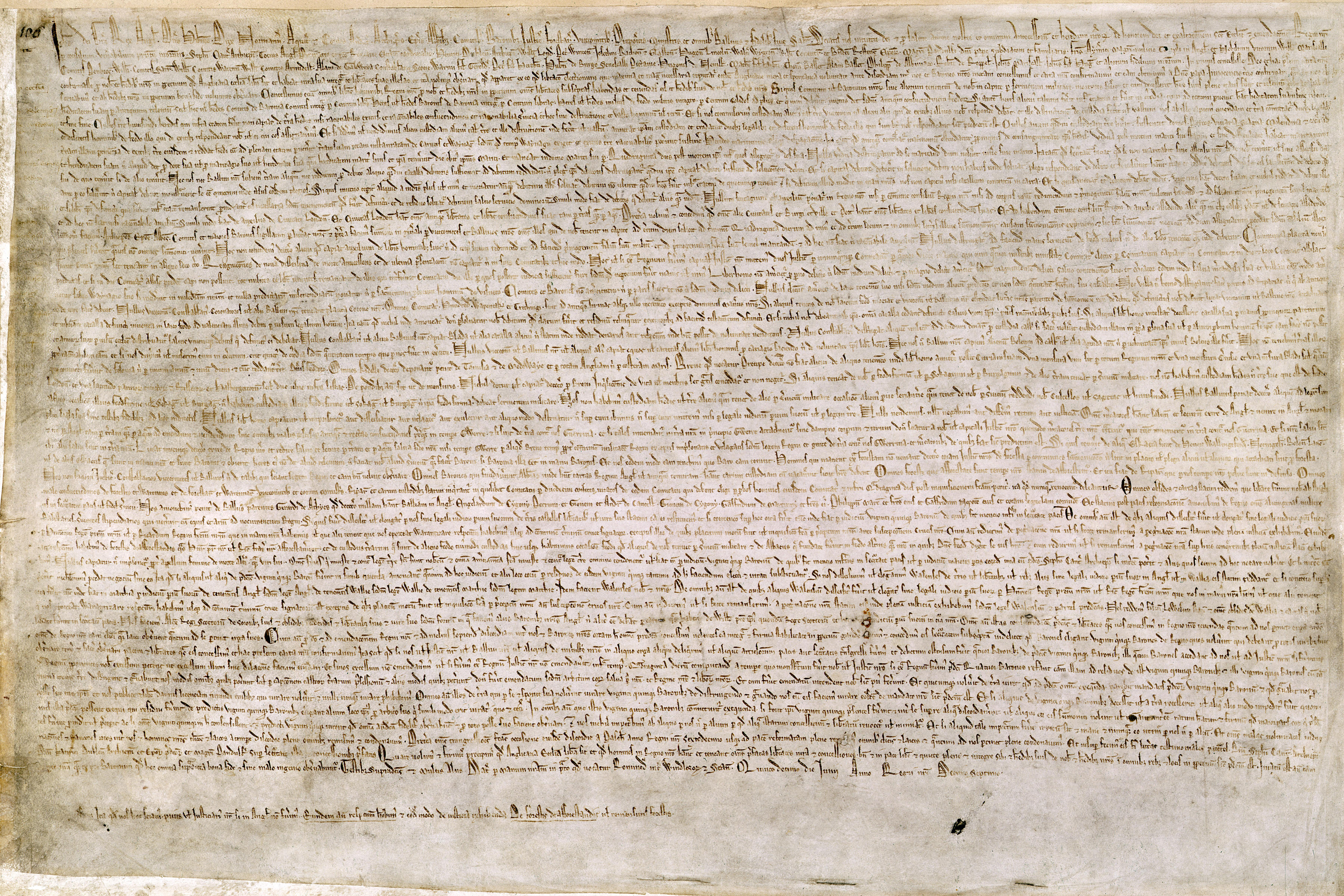
One of only four surviving exemplifications of the 1215 text of Magna Carta

John's French defeats weakened his position in England. The rebellion of his English vassals resulted in Magna Carta, which limited royal power and established common law. This would form the basis of every constitutional battle of the 13th and 14th centuries. The barons and the crown failed to abide by Magna Carta, leading to the First Barons' War when rebel barons provoked an invasion by Prince Louis. Many historians use John's death and William Marshall's appointment as protector of nine-year-old Henry III to mark the end of the Angevin period and the beginning of the Plantagenet dynasty. Marshall won the war with victories at Lincoln and Dover in 1217, leading to the Treaty of Lambeth in which Louis renounced his claims. In victory, the Marshal Protectorate reissued Magna Carta as the basis of future government.

== Legacy ==
=== House of Plantagenet ===
Historians use the period of Prince Louis's invasion to mark the end of the Angevin period and the beginning of the Plantagenet dynasty. The outcome of the military situation was uncertain at John's death; William Marshall saved the dynasty, forcing Louis to renounce his claim with a military victory. However, Philip had captured all the Angevin possessions in France except Gascony. This collapse had several causes, including long-term changes in economic power, growing cultural differences between England and Normandy and (in particular) the fragile, familial nature of Henry's empire. Henry III continued his attempts to reclaim Normandy and Anjou until 1259, but John's continental losses and the consequent growth of Capetian power during the 13th century marked a "turning point in European history".

Richard of York adopted "Plantagenet" as a family name for himself and his descendants during the 15th century. Plantegenest (or Plante Genest) was Geoffrey's nickname, and his emblem may have been the common broom (planta genista in medieval Latin). It is uncertain why Richard chose the name, but it emphasised Richard's hierarchal status as Geoffrey's (and six English kings') patrilineal descendant during the Wars of the Roses. The retrospective use of the name for Geoffrey's male descendants was popular during the Tudor period, perhaps encouraged by the added legitimacy it gave Richard's great-grandson Henry VIII of England.

=== Descent ===
Through John, descent from the Angevins (legitimate and illegitimate) is widespread, and includes all subsequent monarchs of England and the United Kingdom. He had five legitimate children with Isabella:

- Henry III – king of England for most of the 13th century
- Richard – a noted European leader and King of the Romans in the Holy Roman Empire
- Joan – married Alexander II of Scotland, becoming his queen consort.
- Isabella – married the Holy Roman Emperor Frederick II.
- Eleanor – married William Marshal's son (also called William) and, later, English rebel Simon de Montfort.

John also had illegitimate children with a number of mistresses, including nine sons—Richard, Oliver, John, Geoffrey, Henry, Osbert Gifford, Eudes, Bartholomew and (probably) Philip—and three daughters—Joan, Maud and (probably) Isabel. Of these, Joan was the best known, since she married Prince Llywelyn the Great of Wales.

=== Contemporary opinion ===
The chronicler Gerald of Wales borrowed elements of the Melusine legend to give the Angevins a demonic origin, and the kings were said to tell jokes about the stories.

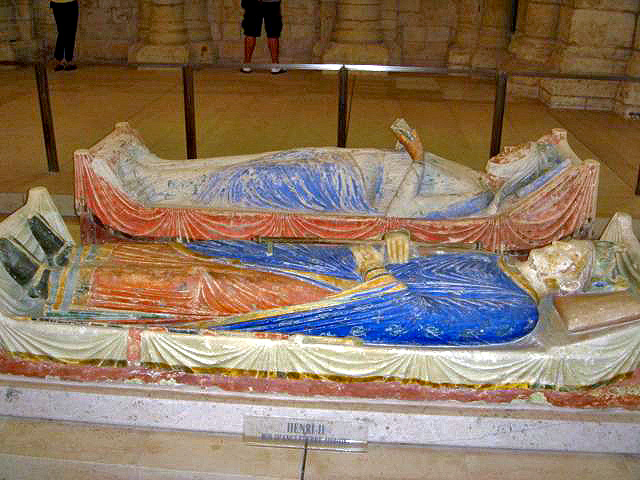
Tomb of Henry and Eleanor in Fontevraud Abbey near Chinon in Anjou, France

Henry was widely criticised by contemporaries, even in his own court. Nevertheless, William of Newburgh, writing after his death, commented that "the experience of present evils has revived the memory of his good deeds, and the man who in his own time was hated by all men, is now declared to have been an excellent and beneficent prince". Henry's son Richard's contemporary image was more nuanced, since he was the first king who was also a knight. Known as a valiant, competent and generous military leader, he was criticised by chroniclers for taxing the clergy for the Crusade and his ransom; clergy were usually exempt from taxes.

Chroniclers Richard of Devizes, William of Newburgh, Roger of Hoveden and Ralph de Diceto were generally unsympathetic to John's behaviour under Richard, but more tolerant of the earliest years of John's reign. Accounts of the middle and later years of his reign are limited to Gervase of Canterbury and Ralph of Coggeshall, neither of whom were satisfied with John's performance as king. His later negative reputation was established by two chroniclers writing after the king's death: Roger of Wendover and Matthew Paris. The latter claimed that John attempted to convert to Islam, but this is not believed by modern historians.

=== Constitutional impact ===
Many of the changes Henry introduced during his rule had long-term consequences. His legal innovations form part of the basis for English law, with the Exchequer of Pleas a forerunner of the Common Bench at Westminster. Henry's itinerant justices also influenced his contemporaries' legal reforms: Philip Augustus's creation of itinerant bailli, for example, drew on Henry's model. Henry's intervention in Brittany, Wales and Scotland had a significant long-term impact on the development of their societies and governments. John's reign, despite its flaws, and his signing of Magna Carta, were seen by Whig historians as positive steps in the constitutional development of England and part of a progressive and universalist course of political and economic development in medieval England. Winston Churchill said, "[W]hen the long tally is added, it will be seen that the British nation and the English-speaking world owe far more to the vices of John than to the labours of virtuous sovereigns". Magna Carta was reissued by the Marshal Protectorate and later as a foundation of future government.

=== Architecture, language and literature ===
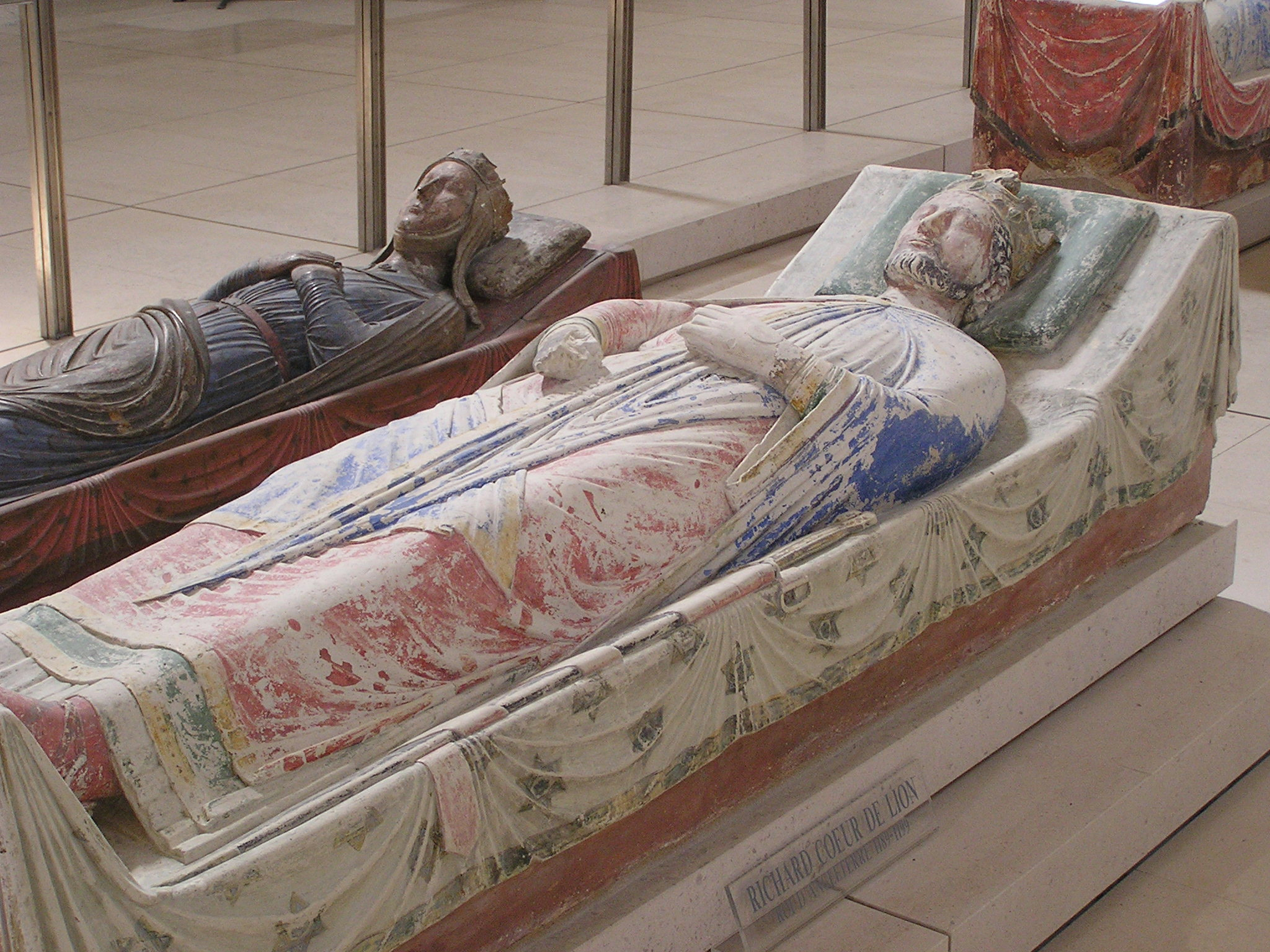
Tomb of Richard I of England and Isabella of Angoulême (at back)

The Angevins were closely associated with the Fontevraud Abbey in Anjou. The abbey was originally the site of his grave and those of Eleanor, Richard, his daughter Joan, grandson Raymond VII of Toulouse and John's wife—Isabella of Angoulême. Henry III visited the abbey in 1254 to reorder these tombs and requested that his heart be buried with them.

=== Historiography ===
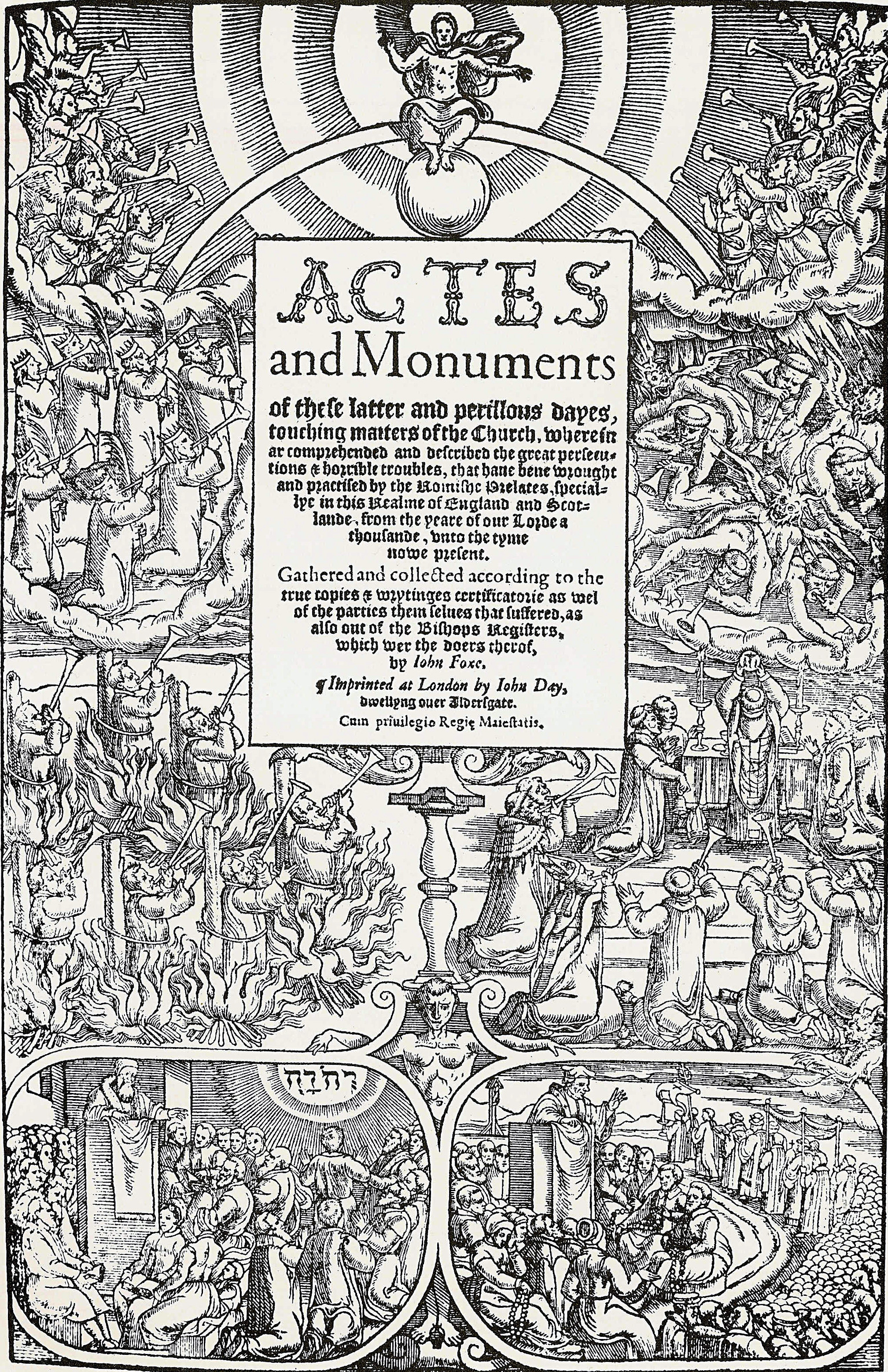
John Foxe's Book of Martyrs (official title Acts and Monuments) viewed John's reign positively.

According to historian John Gillingham, Henry and his reign have attracted historians for many years and Richard (whose reputation has "fluctuated wildly") is remembered largely because of his military exploits. Steven Runciman, in the third volume of the History of the Crusades, wrote: "He was a bad son, a bad husband, and a bad king, but a gallant and splendid soldier." Eighteenth-century historian David Hume wrote that the Angevins were pivotal in creating a genuinely English monarchy and, ultimately, a unified Britain. Interpretations of Magna Carta and the role of the rebel barons in 1215 have been revised; although the charter's symbolic, constitutional value for later generations is unquestionable, for most historians it is a failed peace agreement between factions. John's opposition to the papacy and his promotion of royal rights and prerogatives won favour from 16th-century Tudors. John Foxe, William Tyndale and Robert Barnes viewed John as an early Protestant hero, and Foxe included the king in his Book of Martyrs. John Speed's 1632 Historie of Great Britaine praised John's "great renown" as king, blaming biased medieval chroniclers for the king's poor reputation. Similarly, later Protestant historians view Henry's role in Thomas Becket's death and his disputes with the French as worthy of praise. Similarly, increased access to contemporary records during the late Victorian era led to a recognition of Henry's contributions to the evolution of English law and the exchequer. William Stubbs called Henry a "legislator king" because of his responsibility for major, long-term reforms in England; in contrast, Richard was "a bad son, a bad husband, a selfish ruler, and a vicious man".

He was a bad king: his great exploits, his military skill, his splendour and extravagance, his poetical tastes, his adventurous spirit, do not serve to cloak his entire want of sympathy, or even consideration, for his people. He was no Englishman, but it does not follow that he gave to Normandy, Anjou, or Aquitaine the love or care that he denied to his kingdom. His ambition was that of a mere warrior: he would fight for anything whatever, but he would sell everything that was worth fighting for. The glory that he sought was that of victory rather than conquest.

— William Stubbs, on Richard

The growth of the British Empire led historian Kate Norgate to begin detailed research into Henry's continental possessions and create the term "Angevin Empire" during the 1880s. However, 20th-century historians challenged many of these conclusions. During the 1950s, Jacques Boussard, John Jolliffe and others focused on the nature of Henry's "empire"; French scholars, in particular, analysed the mechanics of royal power during this period. Anglocentric aspects of many histories of Henry's reign were challenged beginning in the 1980s, with efforts to unite British and French historical analyses of the period. Detailed study of Henry's written records has cast doubt on earlier interpretations; Robert Eyton's 1878 volume (tracing Henry's itinerary by deductions from pipe rolls), for example, has been criticised for not acknowledging uncertainty. Although many of Henry's royal charters have been identified, their interpretation, the financial information in the pipe rolls and broad economic data from his reign has proven more challenging than once thought. Significant gaps in the historical analysis of Henry remain, particularly about his rule in Anjou and the south of France.

Interest in the morality of historical figures and scholars waxed during the Victorian period, leading to increased criticism of Henry's behaviour and Becket's death. Historians relied on the judgement of chroniclers to focus on John's ethos. Norgate wrote that John's downfall was due not to his military failures but his "almost superhuman wickedness", and James Ramsay blamed John's family background and innate cruelty for his downfall.

Richard's sexuality has been controversial since the 1940s, when John Harvey challenged what he saw as "the conspiracy of silence" surrounding the king's homosexuality with chronicles of Richard's behaviour, two public confessions, penances and childless marriage. Opinion remains divided, with Gillingham arguing against Richard's homosexuality and Jean Flori acknowledging its possibility.

According to recent biographers Ralph Turner and Lewis Warren, although John was an unsuccessful monarch, his failings were exaggerated by 12th- and 13th-century chroniclers. Jim Bradbury echoes the contemporary consensus that John was a "hard-working administrator, an able man, an able general" with, as Turner suggests, "distasteful, even dangerous personality traits". John Gillingham (author of a biography of Richard I) agrees and judges John to be a less-effective general than Turner and Warren do. Bradbury takes a middle view, suggesting that modern historians have been overly lenient in evaluating John's flaws. Popular historian Frank McLynn wrote that the king's modern reputation amongst historians is "bizarre" and, as a monarch, John "fails almost all those [tests] that can be legitimately set".

=== In popular culture ===
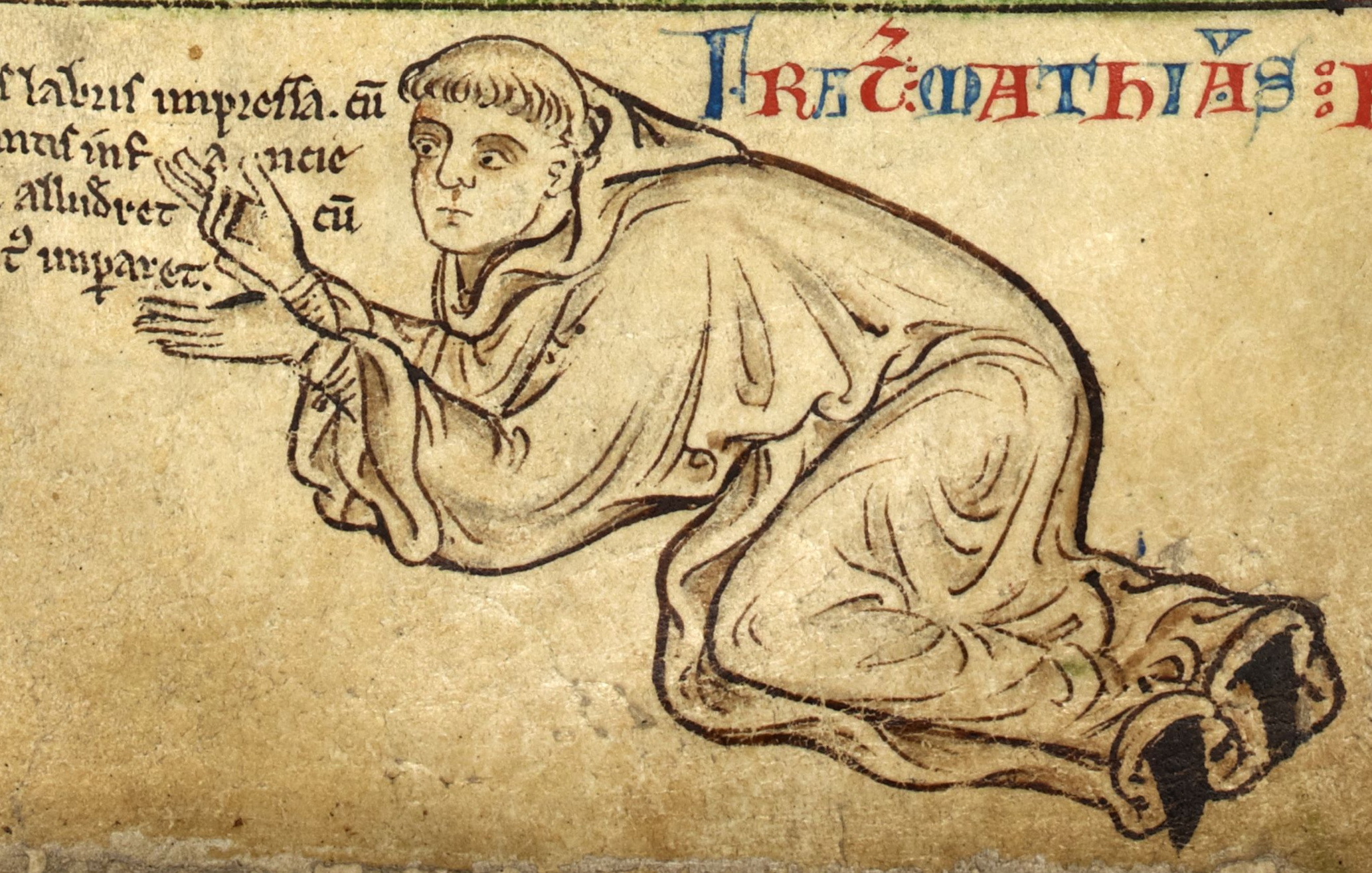
Matthew Paris, a historian during John's early reign

Henry II appears as a fictionalised character in several modern plays and films. The king is a central character in James Goldman's play The Lion in Winter (1966), depicting an imaginary encounter between Henry's family and Philip Augustus over Christmas 1183 at Chinon. Philip's strong character contrasts with John, an "effete weakling". In the 1968 film, Henry is a sacrilegious, fiery and determined king. Henry also appears in Jean Anouilh's play Becket, which was filmed in 1964. The Becket conflict is the basis for T. S. Eliot's play Murder in the Cathedral, an exploration of Becket's death and Eliot's religious interpretation of it.

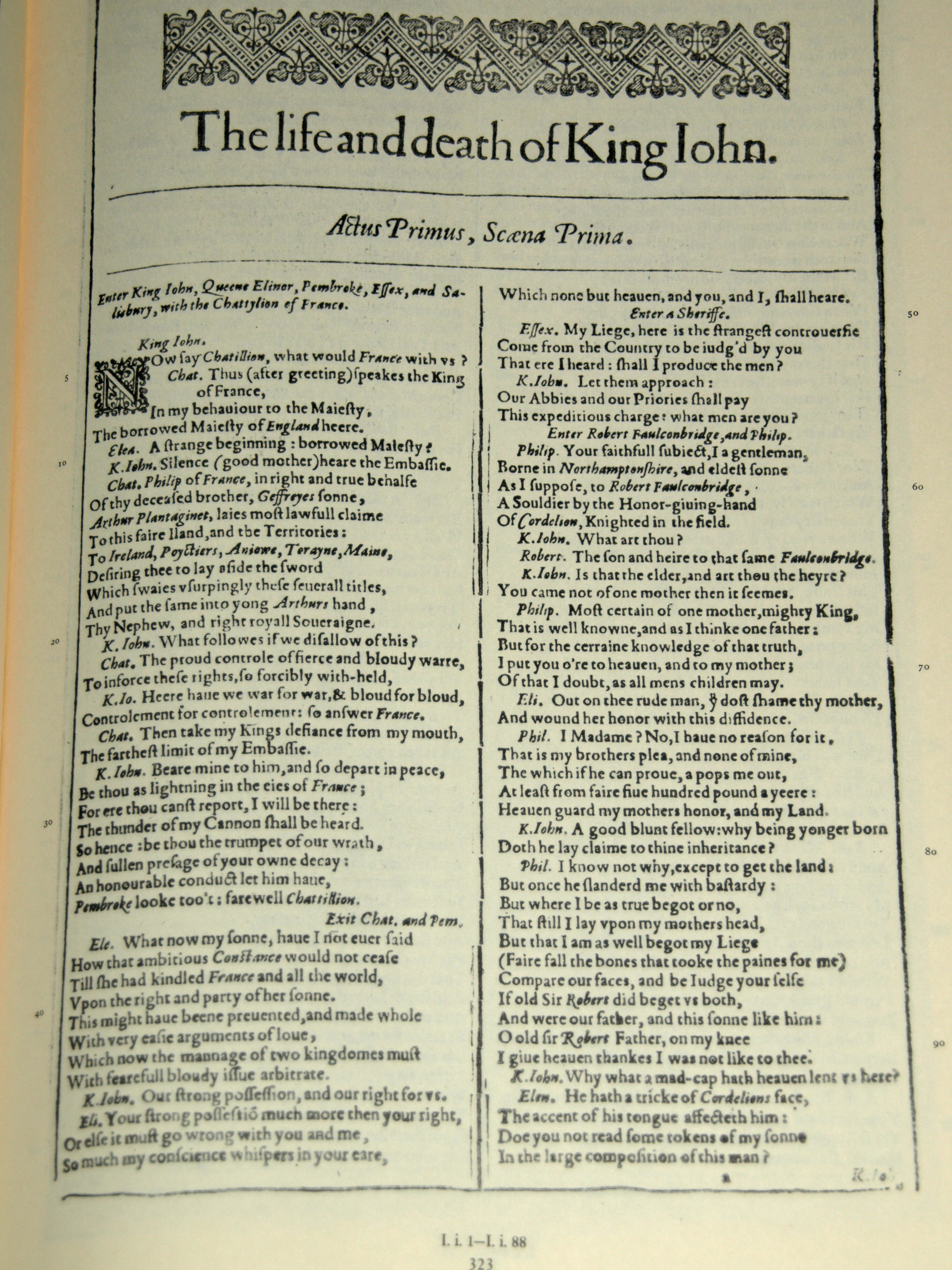
Shakespeare's The Life and Death of King John

During the Tudor period, popular representations of John emerged. He appeared as a "proto-Protestant martyr" in the anonymous play The Troublesome Reign of King John and John Bale's morality play Kynge Johan, in which John attempts to save England from the "evil agents of the Roman Church".Curren-Aquino 1989, p. 19 Shakespeare's anti-Catholic King John draws on The Troublesome Reign, offering a "balanced, dual view of a complex monarch as both a proto-Protestant victim of Rome's machinations and as a weak, selfishly motivated ruler".Curren-Aquino 1989, p. 19 Anthony Munday's plays The Downfall and The Death of Robert Earl of Huntington demonstrate many of John's negative traits, but approve of the king's stand against the Roman Catholic Church.

Richard is the subject of two operas: In 1719, George Frideric Handel used Richard's invasion of Cyprus as the plot for Riccardo Primo, and, in 1784, André Grétry wrote Richard Coeur-de-lion.

==== Robin Hood ====
The earliest ballads of Robin Hood such as those compiled in A Gest of Robyn Hode associated the character with a king named "Edward" and the setting is usually attributed by scholars to either the 13th or the 14th century. As the historian J.C. Holt notes at some time around the 16th century, tales of Robin Hood started to mention him as a contemporary and supporter of Richard, Robin being driven to outlawry during John's misrule, while in the narratives Richard was largely absent, away at the Third Crusade. Plays such as Robert Davenport's King John and Matilda further developed the Elizabethan works in the mid-17th century, focussing on John's tyranny and transferring the role of Protestant champion to the barons. Graham Tulloch noted that unfavourable 19th-century fictionalised depictions of John were influenced by Sir Walter Scott's historical romance Ivanhoe. They, in turn, influenced the children's author Howard Pyle's The Merry Adventures of Robin Hood (1883) which cast John as the principal villain of the Robin Hood narrative. During the 20th century, John also appeared in fictional books and films with Robin Hood. Sam De Grasse's John, in the 1922 film version, commits atrocities and acts of torture. Claude Rains' John, in the 1938 version with Errol Flynn, began a cinematic trend in which John was an "effeminate ... arrogant and cowardly stay-at-home". John's character highlights Richard's virtues and contrasts with Guy of Gisbourne, the "swashbuckling villain" opposing Robin. In the Disney cartoon version, John (voiced by Peter Ustinov) is a "cowardly, thumbsucking lion".

=== In medieval folklore ===
During the 13th century, a folktale developed in which Richard's minstrel Blondel roamed (singing a song known only to him and Richard) to find Richard's prison. This story was the foundation of André Ernest Modeste Grétry's opera Richard Coeur-de-Lion, and inspired the opening of Richard Thorpe's film version of Ivanhoe. Sixteenth-century tales of Robin Hood began describing him as a contemporary (and supporter) of Richard the Lionheart; Robin became an outlaw during the reign of Richard's evil brother, John, while Richard was fighting in the Third Crusade.

== See also ==
- Angevin Empire, for further information on the Angevin domains
- House of Plantagenet, for details on the successors of the Angevins and the wider family
- Capetian House of Anjou and Valois House of Anjou, other dynasties called "Angevin" by some historians
- Treaty of Louviers, for a peace agreement between King Richard I of England and King Philip II of France
- Capetian-Plantagenet rivalry, for an overview of the conflict between Henry II and his descendants against the Kings of France

== Bibliography ==
- Aberth, John (2003). A Knight at the Movies: Medieval History on Film. Routledge. ISBN 978-0-415-93886-0.
- Ackroyd, Peter (2000). London – A Biography. Vintage. ISBN 0-09-942258-1.
- Anouilh, Jean (2005). Antigone. Methuen. ISBN 978-0-413-69540-6.
- Aurell, Martin (2003). L'Empire de Plantagenêt, 1154–1224 (in French). Tempus. ISBN 978-2-262-02282-2.
- Barratt, Nick (2007). "Finance and the Economy in the Reign of Henry II". In Harper-Bill, Christopher; Vincent, Nicholas (eds.). Henry II: New Interpretations. Boydell Press. pp. 242–256. ISBN 978-1-84383-340-6.
- Bevington, David (2002). "Literature and the theatre". In Loewenstein, David; Mueller, Janel (eds.). The Cambridge History of Early Modern English Literature. Cambridge University Press. pp. 428–456. ISBN 978-0521631563.
- Blockmans, Wim; Hoppenbrouwers, Mark (2014). Introduction to Medieval Europe, 300–1500 (2nd ed.). Routledge. ISBN 978-1317934257.
- Bradbury, Jim (2007). "Philip Augustus and King John: Personality and History". In Church, S.D. (ed.). King John: New Interpretations. Boydell & Brewer. ISBN 978-0851157368.
- Brand, Paul (2007). "Henry II and the Creation of the English Common Law". In Harper-Bill, Christopher; Vincent, Nicholas (eds.). Henry II: New Interpretations. Boydell Press. pp. 347–361. ISBN 978-1-84383-340-6.
- Carlton, Charles (2003). Royal Warriors: A Military History of the British Monarchy. Pearson Education. ISBN 0-582-47265-2.
- Carpenter, David (1996). Royal Warriors: A Military History of the British Monarchy. Hambledon Press. ISBN 978-1-85285-137-8.
- Carpenter, David (2004). The Struggle for Mastery: The Penguin History of Britain 1066–1284. Penguin. ISBN 978-0-14-014824-4.
- Churchill, Winston (1958). A History of the English-Speaking Peoples. Vol. 1. Cassell. ISBN 978-0304363896.
- Contramine, Phillipe (1992). Histoire militaire de la France (tome 1, des origines à 1715) (in French). PUF. ISBN 2-13-048957-5.
- Curren-Aquino, Deborah T (1989). "Introduction". In Curren-Aquino, Deborah T (ed.). King John: New Interpretations. University of Delaware Press. pp. xix–xxvi. ISBN 978-0874133370.
- Danziger, Danny; Gillingham, John (2003). 1215: The Year of Magna Carta. Hodder & Stoughton. ISBN 978-0-340-82475-7.
- Davies, R. R. (1990). Domination and Conquest: The Experience of Ireland, Scotland and Wales, 1100–1300. Cambridge University Press. ISBN 978-0-521-02977-3.
- Davies, Norman (1997). Europe – A History. Pimlico. ISBN 0-7126-6633-8.
- Davies, Norman (1999). The Isles – A History. MacMillan. ISBN 0-333-76370-X.
- Dobson, R. B.; Taylor, John (1997). The Rymes of Robin Hood: An Introduction to the English Outlaw. Sutton Publishing. ISBN 978-0750916615.
- Dyer, Christopher (2009). Making a Living in the Middle Ages: The People of Britain, 850–1520. Yale University Press. ISBN 978-0-300-10191-1.
- Elliott, Andrew B. R. (2011). Remaking the Middle Ages: The Methods of Cinema and History in Portraying the Medieval World. McFarland. ISBN 978-0-7864-4624-7.
- Favier, Jean (1993). Dictionnaire de la France médiévale (in French). Fayard.
- Flori, Jean (1999). Richard Coeur de Lion: le roi-chevalier (in French). Biographie Payot. ISBN 978-2-228-89272-8.
- Gillingham, John (2007a). "Doing Homage to the King of France". In Harper-Bill, Christopher; Vincent, Nicholas (eds.). Henry II: New Interpretations. Boydell Press. pp. 63–84. ISBN 978-1-84383-340-6.
- Gillingham, John (2007b). "Historians without Hindsight: Coggshall, Diceto and Howden on the Early Years of John's Reign". In Church, S.D. (ed.). King John: New Interpretations. Boydell & Brewer. pp. 1–26. ISBN 978-0851157368.
- Gillingham, John (1994). Richard Coeur de Lion: Kingship, Chivalry, and War in the Twelfth Century. Hambledon Press. ISBN 978-1-85285-084-5.
- Gillingham, John (2001). The Angevin Empire. Arnold. ISBN 0-340-74115-5.
- Grant, Lindy (2005). Architecture and Society in Normandy, 1120–1270. Yale University Press. ISBN 0-300-10686-6.
- Hallam, Elizabeth M.; Everard, Judith A. (2001). Capetian France, 987–1328 (2nd ed.). Longman. ISBN 978-0-582-40428-1.
- Harvey, John (1948), The Plantagenets, Fontana/Collins, ISBN 0-00-632949-7
- Holt, J. C. (1982). Robin Hood. Thames & Hudson. ISBN 0-500-27541-6.
- Huscroft, Richard (2005). Ruling England, 1042–1217. Pearson. ISBN 0-582-84882-2.
- Jones, Dan (2012). The Plantagenets: The Kings Who Made England. HarperPress. ISBN 978-0-00-745749-6.
- Keefe, Thomas K (2008). "Henry II (1133–1189)". Oxford Dictionary of National Biography (online ed.). Oxford University Press. doi:10.1093/ref:odnb/12949. (Subscription, Wikipedia Library access or UK public library membership required.)
- Maley, Willy (2010). "'And bloody England into England gone': Empire, Monarchy, and Nation in King John". In Maley, Willy; Tudeau, Margaret (eds.). This England, That Shakespeare. Ashgate. pp. 51–62. ISBN 978-0754666028.
- Martinson, Amanda A. (2007). The Monastic Patronage of King Henry II in England, 1154–1189 (Ph.D. thesis). University of St Andrews. hdl:10023/470.
- McLynn, Frank (2007). John Lackland. Vintage Books. ISBN 978-0-7126-9417-9.
- Norgate, Kate (1902). John Lackland. Macmillan. ISBN 978-1230315256. "norgate king john london."
- Palmer, R. Barton (2007). "Queering the Lion Heart: Richard I in The Lion in Winter on Stage and Screen". In Kelly, Kathleen Coyne; Pugh, Tison (eds.). Queer Movie Medievalisms. Ashgate. pp. 45–60. ISBN 978-0-7546-7592-1.
- Plant, John S (2007). "The Tardy Adoption of the Plantagenet Surname". Nomina. 30: 57–84. ISSN 0141-6340.
- Potter, Lois (1998). Playing Robin Hood: the Legend as Performance in Five Centuries. University of Delaware Press. ISBN 978-0-87413-663-0.
- Power, Daniel (2007). "Henry, Duke of the Normans (1149/50-1189)". In Harper-Bill, Christopher; Vincent, Nicholas (eds.). Henry II: New Interpretations. Boydell Press. pp. 85–128. ISBN 978-1-84383-340-6.
- Ramsay, James Henry (1903). 'The Angevin Empire. Sonnenschein. ISBN 978-1143823558.
- Richardson, Douglas (2004). Plantagenet Ancestry: a Study in Colonial and Medieval Families. Genealogical Publishing. ISBN 978-0-8063-1750-2.
- Runciman, Steven (1954). A History of the Crusades. Vol. 3. Cambridge University Press. ISBN 0521061636.
- Schama, Simon (2000). A History of Britain – At the edge of the world. BBC. ISBN 0-563-53483-4.
- Smedley, Edward (1836). The History of France, from the final partition of the Empire of Charlemagne to the Peace of Cambray. Baldwin and Craddock. p. 72.
- Strickland, Matthew (2007). "On the Instruction of a Prince: The Upbringing of Henry, the Young King". In Harper-Bill, Christopher; Vincent, Nicholas (eds.). Henry II: New Interpretations. Boydell Press. pp. 184–214. ISBN 978-1-84383-340-6.
- Stubbs, William (1874). The Constitutional History of England, in its Origin and Development. Clarendon Press. OCLC 2653225.
- Tiwawi, Subha; Tiwawi, Maneesha (2007). The Plays of T.S. Eliot. Atlantic. ISBN 978-81-269-0649-9.
- Turner, Ralph V (1994). King John (The Medieval World). Longman Medieval World Series. ISBN 978-0-582-06726-4.
- Turner, Ralph V.; Heiser, Richard R (2000), The Reign of Richard Lionheart, Ruler of the Angevin empire, 1189–1199, Harlow: Longman, ISBN 0-582-25659-3
- Vauchez, Andre (2000). Encyclopedia of the Middle Ages. Routledge. ISBN 1-57958-282-6.
- Vincent, Nicholas (2007b). "The Court of Henry II". In Harper-Bill, Christopher; Vincent, Nicholas (eds.). Henry II: New Interpretations. Boydell Press. pp. 278–334. ISBN 978-1-84383-340-6.
- Wagner, John (2001). Encyclopedia of the Wars of the Roses. ABC-CLIO. ISBN 1-85109-358-3.
- Warren, W. L. (1991). King John. Methuen. ISBN 0-413-45520-3.
- Warren, W. L. (2000). Henry II (Yale ed.). Yale University Press. ISBN 978-0-300-08474-0.
- Warren, Wilfred Lewis (1978). King John, Revised Edition. University of California Press. ISBN 0-520-03643-3.
- White, Graeme J. (2000). Restoration and Reform, 1153–1165: Recovery From Civil War in England. Cambridge University Press. ISBN 978-0-521-55459-6.
