= Hugh II, Viscount of Châteaudun =

Hugues II (died 10 June 1026), Viscount of Châteaudun and Archbishop of Tours, son of Hugues, Viscount of Châteaudun, and Hildegarde, Viscountess of Châteaudun. As deacon of the Cathedral of Tours, Hugues approved the construction of the Abbey of Bourgeuil near the castle of Château de Chinon. The abbey was founded by Emma, wife of William IV of Aquitaine, on land donated by her father Theobald I, Count of Blois. In 1008, after the death of Archambaud de Sully, he was elected Archbishop of Tours with the support of his allies Odo II, Count of Blois, and Robert II the Pious.

Hugues had two children by an unknown mistress or mistresses: Helgaud and Hugues. The children are believed to be illegitimate as they did not succeed him. He was succeeded as viscount by his sister Melisande.

== Sources ==
- Kerrebrouck, Patrick van., Nouvelle histoire généalogique de l'auguste maison de France, vol. 1: La Préhistoire des Capétiens. 1993.
- Tout, Thomas Frederick, The Empire and the Papacy: 918-1273, Periods of European History, London: Rivingtons, 1932
