= Geoffrey of Vendôme (disambiguation) =

Geoffrey of Vendôme (died 1132) was a French cardinal.

Geoffrey of Vendôme may also refer to:

- Geoffrey II, Count of Anjou, who was also Count Geoffrey I of Vendôme from 1032 to 1056
- Geoffrey II of Vendôme, count from 1085 to 1102
- Geoffrey III of Vendôme, count from 1102 to 1137
