= Counts and dukes of Anjou =

Rulers of the County (later Duchy) of Anjou

County/Dukedom of Anjou
- Coat of arms of the Dukes of Anjou.
- Creation date: 861 (county); 1360 (dukedom)
- Peerage: Peerage of France
- First holder: Robert the Strong (county); Louis I (dukedom)
- Last holder: John the Good (county); Louis Stanislas Xavier of France (dukedom)
- Status: Extinct
- Extinction date: 1795

The count of Anjou was the ruler of the County of Anjou, first granted by King Charles the Bald in the 9th century to Robert the Strong. Ingelger and his son, Fulk the Red, were viscounts until Fulk assumed the title of count.

Ingelger's male line ended with Geoffrey II. Subsequent counts of Anjou were descended from Geoffrey's sister Ermengarde and Count Geoffrey II of Gâtinais. Their agnatic descendants, who included the Angevin kings of England, continued to hold the title and territory until King Philip II Augustus seized the region and annexed it to the French crown lands.

In 1360, the county was raised to the Duchy of Anjou. The title was held by Philip V of Spain before his accession to the throne in 1700. Since then, some Spanish Legitimist claimants to the French throne also claim the title even to the present day, as does a first cousin of the Orléanist pretender.

== Counts of Anjou ==
=== Robertian dynasty ===
The Robertians, or Robertian dynasty, comprised:

Name	Birth	Marriages	Death
Robert the Strong; 861–866 also: marquis of Neustria, count of Tours	820 ? son of Robert III of Worms and Waldrade	? two sons	866 aged 45
Odo; 866–898 also: king of the Franks, marquis of Neustria, count of Paris	852; La Fère son of Robert the Strong and Adelaide of Tours	Théodrate of Troyes two sons	898 aged 46

=== House of Ingelger ===
==== Agnatic descent ====
Name	Birth	Marriages	Death
Ingelger (Viscount of Angers)	845; Rennes son of Tertullus (Tertulle) and Petronilla	Adelais of Amboise one son	888 aged 42
Fulk I the Red; 929–942	870 son of Ingelger and Resinde "Aelinde" D'Amboise	Rosalie de Loches one son	942 aged 72
Fulk II the Good; 942–958	905 son of Fulk the Red	Gerberge two children	11 November 960 aged 55 Tours
Geoffrey I Greymantle; 960–987	940 son of Fulk II	(1) Adele of Meaux four children (2) Adelaise de Chalon; March 979 one son	21 July 987 aged 47
Fulk III the Black; 987–1040	972 son of Geoffrey I Greymantle and Adelaide of Vermandois	(1) Elisabeth of Vendôme one daughter (2) Hildegard of Sundgau; 1001 two children	21 June 1040; Metz aged 68
Geoffrey II Martel; 1040–1060	son of Fulk the Black and Hildegard of Sundgau	(1) Agnes of Burgundy; 1032 no issue (2) Grécie of Langeais no issue (3) Adèle no issue (4) Grécie of Langeais no issue (5) Adelaide no issue	

==== Cognatic descent ====
Name	Portrait	Birth	Marriages	Death
Geoffrey III the Bearded; 1060–1067		1040 eldest son of Geoffrey II, Count of Gâtinais and Ermengarde of Anjou	(1) Julienne de Langeais no issue	1096 aged 56
Fulk IV the Ill-Tempered; 1067–1109		1043 younger son of Geoffrey II, Count of Gâtinais and Ermengarde of Anjou	(1) Hildegarde of Beaugency one daughter (2) Ermengarde de Bourbon; 1070 one son (3) Orengarde de Châtelaillon; 1076 no issue (4) Mantie of Brienne; 1080 no issue (5) Bertrade de Montfort; 1089 one son	14 April 1109 aged 66
Geoffrey IV Martel the Younger; 1103–1106		1070 son of Fulk IV and Ermengarde de Bourbon	never married no issue	19 May 1106; Candé aged 36
Fulk V the Young; 1106–1129 also: king of Jerusalem		1089; Angers son of Count Fulk IV, Count of Anjou and Bertrade de Montfort	(1) Ermengarde of Maine; 1110 four children (2) Melisende; 2 June 1129; Jerusalem two children	13 November 1143; Acre, Israel aged 54

==== House of Plantagenet ====
Geoffrey V Plantagenet 1129–1151 also: count of Tours and Maine, duke of Normandy		24 August 1113 elder son of Fulk V of Anjou and Eremburga de La Flèche	Empress Matilda 17 June 1128 three sons	7 September 1151 Château-du-Loir aged 38
Henry Curtmantle 1151–1189 also: king of England, count of Maine, duke of Normandy, Aquitaine and Gascony, lord of Ireland		5 March 1133 Le Mans son of Geoffrey Plantagenet, Count of Anjou and Empress Matilda	Eleanor of Aquitaine 18 May 1152 Poitiers eight children	6 July 1189 Chinon aged 56
Henry II named his son, Henry the Young King (1155–1183), as co-ruler with him but this was a Norman custom of designating an heir, and the younger Henry did not outlive his father and rule in his own right, so he is not counted as a count on lists of counts.
Richard Lionheart 1189–1199 also: king of England, count of Maine and Nantes, duke of Normandy, Aquitaine and Gascony, lord of Ireland	Richard I of England	8 September 1157 Beaumont Palace son of King Henry II of England and Eleanor of Aquitaine	Berengaria of Navarre 12 May 1191 Limassol No legitimate issue	6 April 1199 Châlus aged 42
Arthur 1199–1203 also: duke of Brittany		29 March 1187 son of Geoffrey II, Duke of Brittany and Constance of Penthièvre	never married no issue	April 1203 Rouen aged 16

In 1204, Anjou was lost to king Philip II of France. It was re-granted as an appanage for Louis VIII's son John, who died in 1232 at the age of thirteen, and then to Louis's youngest son, Charles, later the first Angevin king of Sicily.

=== Capetian dynasty ===
==== House of Anjou ====
Name	Portrait	Birth	Marriages	Death
John Tristan, Count of Anjou; 1219–1232				
Charles I 1246–1285 also: king of Sicily, of Albania, of Jerusalem, count of Maine, of Provence, of Forcalquier		21 March 1226 youngest son of Louis VIII of France and Blanche of Castile	(1) Beatrice of Provence; 31 January 1246; Aix-en-Provence seven children (2) Margaret of Burgundy; 1268 one daughter	7 January 1285; Foggia aged 58
Charles II; 1285–1290 also: king of Naples, of Albania, prince of Salerno, of Achaea		1254 son of Charles I of Anjou and Beatrice of Provence	Maria of Hungary; 1270; 14 children	5 May 1309; Naples aged 55
Margaret; 1290–1299		1272 daughter of Charles II of Naples and Mary of Hungary	Charles of Valois; 16 August 1290; Corbeil six children	31 December 1299 aged 26

In 1290, Margaret married Charles of Valois, the younger brother of king Philip IV of France. He became Count of Anjou in her right.

==== House of Valois ====
Name	Portrait	Birth	Marriages	Death
Charles III; 1290–1325 also: count of Valois		12 March 1270 fourth son of Philip III of France and Isabella of Aragon	(1) Margaret of Naples; 1290 six children (2) Catherine of Courtenay; 1302 four children (3) Mahaut of Châtillon; 1308 four children	16 December 1325; Nogent-le-Roi aged 55
Philip; 1293–1328 also: Philip the Fortunate, count of Maine, of Valois		1293 son of Charles of Valois and Margaret of Naples	(1) Joan the Lame; July 1313 seven children (2) Blanche of Navarre; 11 January 1350 one daughter	22 August 1350; Nogent-le-Roi aged 57

In 1328, Philip of Valois ascended the French throne and became King Philip VI. At this time, the counties of Anjou, Maine, and Valois returned to the royal domain. On 26 April 1332, Philip granted the county to his eldest son, John:

Name	Portrait	Birth	Marriages	Death
John; 1332–1350 also: John the Good, count of Maine, of Poitiers, duke of Normandy, and Aquitaine		26 April 1319 son of Philip VI and Joan the Lame	(1) Bonne of Bohemia; 28 July 1332; Church of Notre-Dame, Melun nine children (2) Joanna I of Auvergne; 19 February 1350; Nanterre two children	8 April 1364; Savoy aged 44

Following John's ascension to the throne as John II in 1350, the title again returned to the royal domain.

== Dukes of Anjou ==
The dukes contributed greatly to social reform in the 1300s and 1400s.

=== First creation: 1360–1481 – House of Valois-Anjou ===
Name	Portrait	Birth	Marriages	Death
Louis I 1356–1360 as Count of Anjou; 1360–1384 as Duke of Anjou also: count of Maine, de Provence and Touraine, king of Naples		23 July 1339; Château de Vincennes second son of King John II of France and Bonne of Luxembourg	Marie of Blois; 1360 three children	20 September 1384; Bisceglie aged 45
Louis II; 1384–1417 also: king of Naples		1377; Toulouse son of Louis I of Anjou	Yolande of Aragon; Arles; 1400 five children	29 April 1417; Angers aged 40
Louis III; 1417–1434 also: count of Provence, Forcalquier, Piedmont and Maine, duke of Calabria, king of Naples		25 September 1403 eldest son of Louis II of Anjou and Yolande of Aragon	Margaret of Savoy, Duchess of Anjou; Cosenza; 1432 no issue	12 November 1434; Cosenza aged 31
René; 1434–1480 also: count of Provence, Piedmont, duke of Bar, Lorraine, king of Naples		16 January 1409; Château d'Angers second son of Louis II of Anjou and Yolande of Aragon	(1) Isabella, Duchess of Lorraine; 1420; 10 children (2) Jeanne de Laval; 10 September 1454; Abbey of St. Nicholas, Angers no issue	10 July 1480; Aix-en-Provence aged 71
Charles IV; 1480–1481 also: Count of Maine, Guise and Provence		1446 son of Charles of Maine, grandson of Louis II of Anjou	Joan of Lorraine; 1474 no issue	1481 aged 35

On the death of Charles IV, Anjou returned to the royal domain.

=== Second creation: 1515–1531 – House of Savoy ===
Name	Portrait	Birth	Marriages	Death
Louise; 1515–1531 also: duchess of Auvergne, of Bourbon, of Nemours		11 September 1476; Pont-d'Ain eldest daughter of Philip II, Duke of Savoy and Margaret of Bourbon	Charles of Orléans; 16 February 1488; Paris one daughter, one son	22 September 1531; Gretz-sur-Loing aged 55

=== Third creation: 1566–1576 – House of Valois-Angoulême ===
Name	Portrait	Birth	Marriages	Death
Henry III; 1566–1576 also: dauphin of France, duke of Angoulême, duke of Orléans		19 September 1551; Palace of Fontainebleau fourth son of Henry II of France and Catherine de' Medici	Louise of Lorraine; 13 February 1575; Notre-Dame de Reims no issue	2 August 1589; Saint-Cloud aged 37

=== Fourth creation: 1576–1584 – House of Valois-Angoulême ===
Name	Portrait	Birth	Marriages	Death
Francis III; 1576–1584 also: duke of Berry, of Touraine, of Alençon, Château-Thierry, of Évreux, Count of Perche, of Meulan, of Mantes		18 March 1555; Palace of Fontainebleau fifth son of Henry II of France and Catherine de' Medici	never married, but briefly engaged to Elizabeth I	19 June 1584; Château-Thierry aged 29

=== Fifth creation: 1608–1626 – House of Bourbon ===
Name	Portrait	Birth	Marriages	Death
Gaston I 1608–1626 also: duke of Orléans, duke of Chartres, count of Blois, duke of Alençon		25 April 1608; Palace of Fontainebleau third son of Henry IV of France and Marie de' Medici	(1) Marie de Bourbon, Duchess of Montpensier; 6 August 1626; Nantes one daughter (2) Marguerite of Lorraine; 31 January 1632; Nancy five children	2 February 1660; Château de Blois aged 51

=== Sixth creation: 1640–1660 – House of Orléans ===
Name	Portrait	Birth	Marriages	Death
Philip I 1640–1660 also: duke of Orléans, duke of Chartres, of Valois, of Nemours, of Montpensier, of Châtellerault, of Saint-Fargeau, of Beaupréau, prince of Joinville, count of Dourdan, Romorantin, of Mortain, of Bar-sur-Seine, viscount of Auge and of Domfront, marquis of Coucy and of Folembray, marquis of Mézières, baron of Beaujolais, seigneur of Montargis		21 September 1640; Château de Saint-Germain-en-Laye second son of Louis XIII and Anne of Austria	(1) Princess Henrietta of England; 31 March 1661; Palais-Royal three children (2) Elizabeth Charlotte of the Palatinate; 16 November 1671; Châlons-sur-Marne three children	9 June 1701; Château de Saint-Cloud aged 60

=== Seventh creation: 1668–1671 – House of Bourbon ===
Name	Portrait	Birth	Marriages	Death
Philippe Charles; 1668–1671		5 August 1668; Château de Saint-Germain-en-Laye second son of Louis XIV and Maria Theresa of Spain	never married	10 July 1671; Château de Saint-Germain-en-Laye aged 2

=== 8th creation: 1672 – House of Bourbon ===
Name	Portrait	Birth	Marriages	Death
Louis François 1672		14 June 1672; Château de Saint-Germain-en-Laye third son of Louis XIV and Maria Theresa of Spain	never married	4 November 1672; Château de Saint-Germain-en-Laye

=== 9th creation: 1683–1700 – House of Bourbon ===
Name	Portrait	Birth	Marriages	Death
Philip II; 1683–1700		19 December 1683; Palace of Versailles second son of Louis, le Grand Dauphin and Duchess Maria Anna Victoria of Bavaria	(1) Maria Luisa of Savoy; 2 November 1701; Figueres four children (2) Elisabeth of Parma; 24 December 1714; Guadalajara seven children	9 July 1746; Madrid aged 62

=== 10th creation: 1710–1715 – House of Bourbon ===
Name	Portrait	Birth	Marriages	Death
Louis the Beloved; 1710–1715 also: dauphin of France		15 February 1710; Palace of Versailles third son of Louis, le Petit Dauphin and Marie Adélaïde of Savoy	Marie Leszczyńska; 4 September 1725; Palace of Fontainebleau eleven children	10 May 1774; Palace of Versailles aged 64

=== 11th creation: 1730–1733 – House of Bourbon ===
Name	Portrait	Birth	Marriages	Death
Philip; 1730–1733		30 August 1730; Palace of Versailles fourth son of Louis XV and Marie Leszczyńska	never married	17 April 1733; Palace of Versailles aged 2

=== 12th creation: 1755–1795 – House of Bourbon ===
Name	Portrait	Birth	Marriages	Death
Louis the Desired; 1755–1795 also: comte de Provence, comte du Maine, comte de Perche and comte de Senoches		17 November 1755; Palace of Versailles fourth son of Louis, Dauphin of France and Princess Maria Josepha of Saxony	Marie Joséphine of Savoy; 14 May 1771; Palace of Versailles no issue	16 September 1824; Paris aged 68

== Dukes of Anjou without legal creation ==
=== 1883–1936 – House of Bourbon ===
After the death of Henri, Count of Chambord, only the descendants of Philip V of Spain remained of the male line of Louis XIV. The most senior of these, the Carlist claimant to the Spanish throne, became the eldest of the Capetians. Some of them used the courtesy title of Duke of Anjou, as shown below:

Name	Portrait	Birth	Marriages	Death
Jaime; 1909–1931 also: duque de Madrid		27 June 1870; Vevey third son of Carlos, Duke of Madrid and Princess Margherita of Bourbon-Parma	never married	2 October 1931; Paris aged 60
Alfonso Carlos; 1931–1936 also: duque de San Jaime		12 September 1849; London second son of Juan, Count of Montizón and Archduchess Maria Beatrix of Austria-Este	Infanta Maria das Neves of Portugal; 26 April 1871; Kleinheubach no issue	29 September 1936; Vienna aged 87

At the death of Alfonso Carlos in 1936, the Capetian seniority passed to the exiled King of Spain, Alfonso XIII. In 1941, Infante Jaime, Duke of Segovia, succeeded his father Alfonso XIII (Alphonse I of France according to the Legitimists) as the heir male of Louis XIV and therefore as the Legitimist claimant to the French throne. He then adopted the title of Duke of Anjou.

=== 1941–present – House of Bourbon ===
Name	Portrait	Birth	Marriages	Death
Jaime; 1941–1975 also: duque de Segovia, duque de Madrid		23 June 1908; Royal Palace of La Granja de San Ildefonso second son of King Alfonso XIII of Spain and Princess Victoria Eugenie of Battenberg	(1) Emmanuelle de Dampierre; 4 March 1935; Church of San Ignacio de Loyola, Rome two children (2) Charlotte Tiedemann; 3 August 1949; Innsbruck no issue	20 March 1975; St. Gallen aged 66
Alfonso; 1975–1989 also: duque de Cádiz, duc de Bourbon		20 April 1936; Rome eldest son of Jaime and Emmanuelle de Dampierre	María del Carmen Martínez-Bordiú y Franco; 8 March 1972; Royal Palace of El Pardo two sons	30 January 1989; Beaver Creek Resort aged 52
Louis Alphonse; 1989–present also: duc de Touraine, duc de Bourbon		25 April 1974; Madrid second son of Alfonso and María del Carmen Martínez-Bordiú y Franco	María Margarita Vargas Santaella; 6 November 2004; La Romana four children	living

=== 2004–present – House of Bourbon-Orléans ===
On 8 December 2004, Henry, Count of Paris, Duke of France, Orléanist Pretender to the French throne, granted the title Duke of Anjou to his nephew, Charles-Philippe d'Orléans. Since he did not recognize his cousin's courtesy title, in his view, the title was available since 1795.

Name	Portrait	Birth	Marriages	Death
Charles-Philippe; 2004–present		3 March 1973; Paris eldest son of Michel, Count of Évreux, and Beatrice Pasquier de Franclieu	Diana Álvares Pereira de Melo, 11th Duchess of Cadaval; 21 June 2008; Cathedral of Évora	living
