= Hugh I, Viscount of Châteaudun =

Hugues (died 989 or after), Viscount of Châteaudun, son of Geoffrey I, Viscount of Châteaudun, and Ermengarde. Virtually nothing is known about his life.

Hughes married Hildegarde du Perche, daughter of Hervé I, Lord of Mortagne-au-Perche and Count of Perche, and Mélisende. They had four children:

- Hugues II de Châteaudun, Viscount of Châteaudun and Archbishop of Tours
- Adalaud, Seigneur de Château-Chinon
- Melisende, Viscountess of Châteaudun, married Fulcois, Count of Mortaigne, son of Rotrou, Seigneur de Nogent
- Daughter (name unknown), married Albert II de la Ferté-en-Beauce, son of Albert I de la Ferté-en-Beauce and Godehildis de Bellême.

Hughes was succeeded by his wife Hildegarde, as Viscountess of Châteaudun, upon his death. It is likely that their son Hughes I assumed the role of Viscount of Châteaudun when he reached the age of maturity.

== Sources ==
- Boussard, Jacques, L'origine des familles seigneuriales dans la région de la Loire moyenne, Cahiers de Civilisation Médiévale 5, 1962

- Nelson, Janet L., The Annals of St-Bertin, Manchester University Press, 1991
- Kerrebrouck, Patrick van., Nouvelle histoire généalogique de l'auguste maison de France, vol. 1: La Préhistoire des Capétiens, 1993.
- Tout, Thomas Frederick, The Empire and the Papacy: 918-1273, Periods of European History, London: Rivingtons, 1932
- Bury, J. B. (Editor), The Cambridge Medieval History, Volume III, Germany and the Western Empire, Cambridge University Press, 1922
- Reuter, Timothy (Editor), The New Cambridge Medieval History, Volume III, 900-1024, Cambridge University Press, 1999
