= Siege of Domfront =

Siege of Domfront may refer to:

- Siege of Domfront (1052), the siege and capture of the town by Geoffrey II, Count of Anjou
- Siege of Domfront (1053), the siege and recapture of the town by William, Duke of Normandy
- Siege of Domfront (1356), the siege and capture of the town by the French during the Hundred Years' War
- Siege of Domfront (1418), the siege and capture of the town by the English during the Hundred Years' War
- Siege of Domfront (1450), the siege and capture of the town by the French during the Hundred Years' War
- Siege of Domfront (1574), the siege and capture of the town
