= Hugh VI =

Hugh VI may refer to:

- Hugh VI of Lusignan (c. 1039/1043–1102)
- Hugh VI, Viscount of Châteaudun (died 1191)
