= Hugues du Perche =

French nobleman (10th century)

Hugues du Perche was a 10th-century French noble. Hugonis Pertice was probably identical with the youngest son of Fulcois, the Count of Perche, and his wife, Melisende, who had the same name and is mentioned in a document from the Abbey of Saint-Vincent of Le Mans dating from 1061. He was one of the first known ancestors in male line of the Plantagenets. His elder brother was Geoffrey II Viscount of Châteaudun, I Count of Perche. The origins of his parents are debated. What is certain is that he is descended from the family of viscounts of Châteaudun, although it is unclear whether through his mother or his father.

He married Béatrice de Mâcon, widow of Geoffroy I, Count Gatinais. She was the daughter of Albéric ou Aubry II de Mâcon, comte de Mâcon. The children from this marriage were:

- Geoffrey II, Count of Gâtinais. He was known by the nickname Ferréol ("Ironwood"). By his marriage with Ermengarde of Anjou, his descendants would not only become Count of Anjou, but King of Jerusalem and England as well.
- Liétaud ( † 1050), Lord of Yèvres of 1028–1050.

In the charter that his step-son Aubry, Count Gâtinais, and Francon, Bishop of Paris signed May 26, 1028, he is quoted as a witness, along with his two sons Geoffroy and Liétaud. It is this act that evidences the second marriage of Beatrice with Hugues du Perche.

Being from a vassal family of the counts of Blois, while the counts Gâtinais were faithful to the Capetian kings of France, the marriage took place probably during a period of rapprochement between the two families, during the marriage of King Robert II the Pious and Bertha of Burgundy, widow of Eudes I of Blois, between 996 and 1003.

== Sources ==
- Rohan, K. S. B. (2000). Onomastique et parenté dans l'Occident médiéval. Oxford: Unit for Prosopographical Research, Linacre College. ISBN 1-900934-01-9.:
- Édouard de Saint Phalle, « Les comtes de Gâtinais aux Xe et XIe siècle »
