= Hugh IV =

Hugh IV may refer to:

- Hugh IV of Lusignan (died c. 1026)
- Hugh IV of Maine (died 1051)
- Hugh IV, Viscount of Châteaudun (died 1110)
- Hugh IV, Count of Saint-Pol (died 1205)
- Hugh IV of Rodez (c. 1212–1274)
- Hugh IV of Burgundy (1213–1272)
- Hugh IV, Count of Rethel (1244–1285)
- Hugh IV, Count of Angoulême (1259–1303), a.k.a. Hugh XIII of Lusignan
- Hugh IV of Cyprus (1293 to 1296–1359)
