= Hervé I of Perche =

Count of Perche and Mortagne

Hervé I
- Count of Perche and Mortagne
- Successor: Hervé II or Fulcois
- Died: after 25 June 955
- Spouse: Melisende
- Issue: Hildegarde of Perche; Hervé II, Count of Mortagne-du-Perche; Gerberge du Perche
- Father: Hugh I, Count of Maine (possibly)

Hervé I (died after 25 June 955), Count of Perche and Mortagne.

Hervé appears several times between 941 and 946 in the entourage of Hugh the Great and is likely Hervei Comiti Mauritianae cited in a transaction dated June 24, 955.

According to Settipani, Hervé was either the son or son-in-law of Hugh I, Count of Maine.

Hervé married Melisende (possibly a daughter of Hugh I). They had a number of children:

- Hervé II, Count of Mortagne-du-Perche
- Gerberge du Perche, married Gelduin of Saumur
- Hildegarde of Perche, married Hugh I, Viscount of Châteaudun.

Hervé I was succeeded either by his son Hervé II or Fulcois, the husband of his granddaughter Melissende.

== Sources ==
- Settipani, Christian, Les vicomtes de Châteaudun et leurs alliés, dans Onomastique et Parenté dans l'Occident médiéval, Oxford, Linacre, Unit for Prosopographical Research, 2000
- Europäische Stammtafeln, Vol. III, Les Vicomtes de Châteaudun
