= Lords, counts and dukes of Perche =

Rulers of the French territory

Coat of arms of the county of Perche.

The county of Perche was a medieval county lying between Normandy and Maine.

It was held by a continuous line of counts until 1226. One of these, Geoffroy III, would have been a leader of the Fourth Crusade had he not died before the assembled forces could depart. The county then became a possession of the crown, which removed part of it to create the county of Alençon.

After 1325, both counties were generally held by a member or members of a cadet line of the House of Valois. Upon the death without children of the last duke of Alençon in 1525, it returned to the crown, and was granted only sporadically thereafter.

== Lords of Mortagne, lords of Nogent-le-Rotrou and viscounts of Châteaudun ==
The lords of Perche were originally titled lords of Mortagne-au-Perche, until Rotrou III adopted the style of count of Perche in 1126, thus uniting the lordship of Mortagne-au-Perche, the viscountcy of Châteaudun and the lordship of Nogent-le-Rotrou in the countship of Perche and Montagne.

=== Lords of Mortagne ===
==== House of Rorgonid ====
- Hervé I, 941- 955
- Hervé II, 974–980, son of the previous

Here after, the title is merged with the viscount of Châteaudun and the lord of Nogent-le-Rotrou.

=== Lords of Nogent-le-Rotrou ===
==== House of Nogent-le-Rotrou ====
- Rotrou I, 960–996
- Fulcois, son of the previous and husband of Melisende, Viscountess of Châteaudun, daughter of Herve I

Here after, the title is merged with the viscount of Châteaudun and the lord of Mortagne-au-Perche

=== Viscounts of Châteaudun ===
==== House of Châteaudun ====
- ...

== Lords and counts of Perche and Mortagne ==
=== House of Châteaudun ===
- Fulcuich, c. 1000
- Geoffroy I, d. bef. 1041 (viscount of Châteaudun, lord of Nogent-le-Rotrou and of Mortagne-au Perche)
- Hugh I, d. c. 1077–1080 (viscount of Châteaudun, lord of Nogent-le-Rotrou and of Mortagne-au Perche)
- Rotrou II, d. c. 1077–1080 (viscount of Châteaudun, lord of Nogent-le-Rotrou and of Mortagne-au Perche)

Here after, the title is separated in count of Perche and count of Mortagne.

== Counts of Perche ==
=== House of Châteaudun ===
- Geoffroy II, d. 1100, a companion of William the Conqueror
- Rotrou III the Great, d. 1144 (also Count of Mortagne 1126–1144), married to Matilda (second wife) and Hawise of Salisbury, daughter of Walter of Salisbury (third wife)
- Rotrou IV, under the regency of his mother Hawise and her second husband Robert I of Dreux. Married to Matilda (d. 1184), daughter of Theobald IV. Killed at Siege of Acre, 1191.
- Geoffroy III, d. 1202 (married Matilda of Saxony (1172-1209/10))
- Thomas, killed at the Battle of Lincoln, 1217
- William II, d. 1226 (Bishop of Châlons-sur-Marne)

Here after the county returned to the royal domain.

The title of count of Perche was granted anew by the king to members of the House of Maine and the House of Châteaudun.

- ...

=== House of Valois ===
- 1286 - 1325: Charles I
- 1325–1346 : Charles II
- 1346-1361: Charles III
- 1361–1377 : Robert
- 1377–1404 : Peter II
- 1404–1415 : John I
- 1415–1474 : John II

The county was confiscated by the crown between 1474 and 1478, but was then returned to the family.

- 1478–1492 : René
- 1492–1525 : Charles IV, son of, married Margareth of Navarre
- 1525–1549 : Margaret, widow of

After the death of Margaret of Navarre the fief went to the royal domain. Henceforth the title of duke of Perche was granted by the king from time to time.

== Dukes of Perche ==
=== House of Valois ===
- Francis, duke of Perche (1566–1584)

=== House of Bourbon ===
- Louis, duke of Perche (1771–1814)

== English title ==
- Thomas Montacute, 4th Earl of Salisbury was created Earl of Perche in 1419 as part of Henry V of England's policy of creating Norman titles for his noblemen.
- Thomas Beaufort, Count of Perche was created Count of Perche in December 1427, but the title was contested with John II of Alençon.
- Humphrey Stafford, 6th Earl of Stafford, 1st Duke of Buckingham was created count of Perche in 1431 by Henry VI of England as titular king of France.
