= Hildegarde, Viscountess of Châteaudun =

Hildegarde of Perche (died 14 April 1005 or later) was daughter of Hervé I, Count of Perche, and his wife Mélisende. Hildegarde became Viscountess of Châteaudun upon the death of her husband Hugh I, Viscount of Châteaudun.

Hildegarde and Hugues had four children:

- Hugues II, Viscount of Châteaudun and Archbishop of Tours
- Adalaud, Seigneur de Château-Chinon
- Melisende, Viscountess of Châteaudun, married Fulcois, Count of Mortaigne, son of Rotrou, Seigneur de Nogent.
- Unnamed Daughter, married Albert II de la Ferté-en-Beauce, son of Albert I de la Ferté-en-Beauce and Godehildis de Bellême.

Hildegarde was succeeded by her son Hugues II as Viscount of Châteaudun when he reached the age of maturity.

== Sources ==
- Livingstone, Amy (2006). Brother Monk: Monks and their Family in the Chartrain, 1000–1200 AD. Brill. pp. 93–115. ISBN 978-90-474-1136-9.
- Thompson, Kathleen (2002). Power and Border Lordship in Medieval France: The County of the Perche, 1000-1226. Boydell & Brewer Ltd. ISBN 978-0-86193-254-2.
