= Geoffrey V, Viscount of Châteaudun =

Geoffrey V (Geoffroy V) (died 1218), Viscount of Châteaudun, son of Hugh VI, Viscount of Châteaudun, and Jeanne de Preuilly, daughter of Gosbert de Preuilly, Seigneur of Bouchet and Guerche, and Adela de Vendôme. In 1213, he granted the nuns of Rives the right to graze their livestock in the forest of Epinat.

Geoffrey’s first marriage was to Adelicia de Nevers. Adelicia is listed in Europäische Stammtafeln as Geoffrey’s wife but no heritage is identified. As parents have been suggested William IV, Count of Nevers, and Eléonore, Countess of Vermandois, but this marriage is known to have been childless. Geoffrey and Adelicia had nine children:

- Philippe (died 1202)
- Hugues (died 1202)
- Geoffrey VI, Viscount of Châteaudun
- Isabelle (died 1259 or after)
- Alix (died after October 1239), married Herve III Seigneur de Gallardon
- Jeanne (died 1217 or after)
- Agnes (died after 1271), married Jean Seigneur d’Estouteville, son of Henri, Seigneur d’Estouteville, and Mathilde d’Eu, a descendant of Geoffrey, Count of Eu, son of Richard I, Duke of Normandy
- Etienne
- Renaud.

Geoffrey married secondly Alix de Fréteval, daughter of Urso II, Seigneur de Fréteval, and Grecie de Faye. Urso’s father was a rival of Geoffrey’s ancestor and namesake Geoffrey III of Châteaudun. No children are recorded from this marriage.

Upon his death, Geoffrey was succeeded by his son Geoffrey VI.

== Sources ==
- Settipani, Christian, Les vicomtes de Châteaudun et leurs alliés, dans Onomastique et Parenté dans l'Occident médiéval, Oxford, Linacre, Unit for Prosopographical Research, 2000
- Yvard, Jean-Claude (1982). "Les « rideaux » de la Guerche". Norois. 113: 79–81.
- Europäische Stammtafeln, Vol. III, Les Vicomtes de Châteaudun
