= Geoffrey II of Anjou =

Count of Anjou and Count of Vendôm

Geoffrey II, called Martel (1006 – 14 November 1060) was the count of Anjou from 1040 to 1060 and count of Vendôme from 1032 to 1056. He was the son of Count Fulk III and Countess Hildegarde.

He fought battles against William VII of Aquitaine, Theobald III of Blois, and William II of Normandy. During his twenty-year reign, Geoffrey II faced down the ambitions of the bishop of Le Mans, Gervais de Château-du-Loir and was able to maintain his authority over the County of Maine. Martel founded the Abbey aux Dames in Saintonge and also, in collaboration with his wife Agnes, founded the Abbaye de la Trinité (Abbey of the Trinity) at Vendôme. He was described in the Gesta Normannorum Ducum as "a treacherous man in every respect, frequently inflicted assaults and intolerable pressure on his neighbors."

== Combat ==
"In alliance with King Henry I of France, Count Geoffrey laid siege to Tours in the winter of 1042–3. After the battle of Nouy on 21 August 1044 Theobald III, Count of Blois (1039–89) was taken prisoner by [Count Geoffrey], to whom he surrendered Tours with Chinon and Langeais, excluding, however, the monastery of Marmoutier." Henry and Geoffrey became estranged after this, and were not reconciled again until c. 1052, when their names appear together in a charter of August of that year. This is in conjunction with the rebellion of William of Talou against the duke of Normandy, and Count Geoffrey's taking possession of the city of Mans (shortly after 26 March 1051).

Allied once again with King Henry, Count Geoffrey assaulted Normandy and seized the towns of Domfront and Alençon, evidently with the help of treachery within. Duke William laid siege to Domfront, which resisted his efforts to retake it throughout the winter of 1052. At this point Talou withdrew from the siege and started his rebellion. Duke William rapidly retook Alençon and then Domfront, driving Count Geoffrey back across the Norman border into Maine.

While Count Geoffrey was off balance, Duke William laid siege to Talou's castle at Arques. King Henry failed to relieve Arques, and Talou's rebellion had failed and he was exiled by late 1053. In late January, early February 1054, Count Geoffrey and King Henry together invaded Normandy and marched down the Seine toward Rouen. The King had divided his army and sent the other wing through eastern Normandy under the command of his brother Eudes, supported by Count Reginald of Clermont, Count Ralph of Montdidier, and Guy I, Count of Ponthieu. This army was defeated in a battle near Mortemer. Upon learning of this reverse, King Henry insisted upon retreating from Normandy, and Count Geoffrey accompanied him.

For the next several years, the war was centered in the County of Maine, with Duke William on the offensive. But King Henry in 1057, "burning to avenge the insult inflicted on him by the duke, summoned Geoffrey, count of Anjou, to prepare a large army for another expedition into Normandy." (GND) This combined effort placed Duke William temporarily on the defensive. He retreated before the invaders as they moved deeper into Normandy. After penetrating to the Bessin, the Franco-Angevin army began to ford the River Dives near the estuary which is tidal. After the king and Count Geoffrey had crossed over, the remainder of their army got stuck on the opposite bank by the incoming tide. Duke William launched a sudden attack and defeated them. King Henry and Count Geoffrey withdrew again from Normandy and never returned. Count Geoffrey continued to offer resistance in Maine against the Norman expansion until his death on 14 November 1060.

Geoffrey Martel's death in 1060, as well as that of Henry I of France in the same year, facilitated the later Norman Conquest since both were long-time opponents and threats to Normandy and, had they still been alive at the time of Edward the Confessor's death, Duke William would likely have been unable to leave his continental territories undefended long-enough to conquer England.

== Family ==
An unusual entry in the cartulary of Ronceray describes a dispute over a vineyard seized by Geoffrey Martel and granted to his "wives, or rather concubines", Agnes, Grécie, Adele, and Adelaide. Whether these women were his wives or concubines, each relationship can be described.

Geoffrey II's first wife was Agnes of Burgundy, the widow of Duke William V of Aquitaine; she and Geoffrey married in 1032, but had divorced by 1050.

His second wife was Grécie of Langeais. Geoffrey II dismissed her to marry Adèle, the daughter of a "Count Odo", perhaps Count Odo II of Blois. He also divorced Adèle, and took Grécie back as his wife. His last wife was a German woman named Adelaide.

Despite these marital escapades, Geoffrey died childless.

== Succession ==
Since Geoffrey II had no living male children from either of two marriages, when he died the Anjou title went to his nephews, the two sons of his sister Ermengarde-Blanche (m. Geoffroy V of Château-Landon). Geoffroy III Le Barbu (the Bearded) was Count of Anjou from 1060 to 1068; Fulk IV Réchin (the Mouth) was count from 1068 to 1109. Fulk IV's grandson, Geoffrey Plantagenet, married Matilda, heir to the English throne, and began the House of Plantagenet line of English kings.

== Beliefs ==
Geoffrey was well known for his adherence to the teachings of Berengar of Tours, ultimately playing a key role in securing his release from imprisonment later in life. This establishes Geoffrey as the first widely recognized Proto-Protestant knight.

== Sources ==
- Jessee, W. Scott (2000). Robert the Burgundian and the Counts of Anjou, Ca. 1025-1098. The Catholic University of America Press.

| Preceded by Fulk III | Count of Anjou; 1040–1060 | Succeeded by Geoffrey III |
