= Geoffrey II of Vendôme =

Lord of Preuilly (1067-1085)

- Seigneur
- Coat of arms
- Born: 11th century
- Died: 19 May 1102
- Spouse(s): Euphrosine of Nevers
- Issue Geoffrey III of Vendôme, Eschivard de Preuilly
- Father: Goffredo II di Preuilly
- Mother: Almodis
- Occupation: Politician

Geoffrey II, surnamed Jordan, was the lord of Preuilly from 1067 (as Geoffrey III) and count of Vendôme from 1085, the son of Geoffrey II of Preuilly and Almodis of Blois.

When his brother-in-law Bouchard III died, he inherited Vendôme. He took part in the war between the brothers, the counts of Anjou, Geoffrey III and Fulk IV. He originally supported Fulk, but reversed his allegiance and was imprisoned by Lancelin de Beaugency only to be released in 1090 with a ransom.

He followed his predecessors into conflict with the Trinity Abbey, Vendôme and was excommunicated. In penitence, he took part in the Crusade of 1101 as part of the army of William IX and died in 1102 a prisoner in Arab hands following the siege of Ascalon.

With his wife, Euphrosine, sister of Bouchard IV, he had three sons:

- Geoffrey III, who succeeded in Vendôme
- Escivard, who succeeded in Preuilly
- Engelbaud (1062–1115), Archbishop of Tours

Geoffrey had donated a church to the abbey of La Trinité of Vendôme which Euphrosyne took back after his death. She was later forced to return the church and excommunicated.

== Sources ==
- Comtes de Vendôme (Seigneurs de Preuilly) (archive)
- Prof. J. S. C. Riley-Smith, Prof, Jonathan Phillips, Dr. Alan V. Murray, Dr. Guy Perry, Dr. Nicholas Morton, A Database of Crusaders to the Holy Land, 1099-1149 (available on-line)
