= Rotrou II of Perche =

Rotrou I (born before 1031, died 1079), Viscount of Châteaudun and Count of Perche (as Rotrou II), second son of Geoffrey II, Viscount of Châteaudun, and Helvise de Corbon (d. 1 March 1080), daughter of Rainard, Lord of Pithiviers.

At the death of Geoffrey II, his elder son Hugh became Viscount of Châteaudun, while Rotrou probably inherited the family interests around Nogent-le-Rotrou. After his brother's death, he concentrated the family lands and, by the late 1050s, he was a count, with a centre of power around Mortagne. These northern dominions probably came to him from his wife, Adelise de Domfront, as part of a settlement that divided the Bellême inheritance between her cousin Mabel, who married Roger de Montgomery, and Adelise.

After the death of William of Gouët in the late 1050s, Rotrou, with the help of Roger de Montgomery, tried to extend his influence for the strongholds of Perche-Gouët. However, William's wife Matilda remarried to Geoffrey, viscount of Mayenne, and was able to fend off the attacks.

By 1058, Rotrou was in attendance on King Henry I of France in his attack on the Norman outpost of Thimer. However, by 1066, he had become closer to William, the Norman Duke, which can be inferred from the participation of his son Geoffrey in the invasion of England. Moreover, in 1078, William paid Rotrou a subsidy, and Rotrou supported him on the siege of Remalard, where the supporters of his rebel son, Robert Curthose, were concentrated.

Rotrou was quite successful, and able to make substantial donations to religious houses, including St.Vincent of le Mans and his father's foundation of Saint Denis at Nogent-le-Rotrou, where he was able to finish the church.

Rotrou married Adelise (Adeliza) de Domfront, daughter of Warin de Domfront and granddaughter of William of Bellême. Their issue was:

- Geoffrey II, Count of Perche, married Béatrix de Montdidier de Roucy
- Hugh IV, Viscount of Châteaudun
- Rotrou de Châteaudun (d. after 1110), Lord of Montfort-le-Rotrou
- Fulco de Châteaudun (d. after 1078)
- Helvise de Châteaudun (d. after 1078).

Rotrou was succeeded as Viscount of Châteaudun by his son Hugues and, as Count of Perche, by his son Geoffroy.

Rotrou attempted to avenge the murder of his father by attacking Thierry, Bishop of Chartres, an act for which he was briefly excommunicated. Rotrou also had an illegitimate son named Robert “Manda Guerra” (d. after 1095).

== Sources ==
- Thompson, Kathleen (2002a). "Les premiers temps de Saint-Denis de Nogent-le-Rotrou et leurs réécritures". Bibliothèque de l'École des chartes. 160 (2): 641–666. doi:10.3406/bec.2002.463035. ISSN 0373-6237. JSTOR 42960029.
- Thompson, Kathleen (2002b). Power and Border Lordship in Medieval France: The County of the Perche, 1000-1226. Boydell & Brewer Ltd. ISBN 978-0-86193-254-2.
