= Hugh VI of Châteaudun =

Hugues VI (died 1191), Viscount of Châteaudun, known as the Clever (Callidus), son of Hugues IV, Viscount of Châteaudun, and Marguerite de Saint-Calais, daughter of Sylvestre de Saint-Calais.

He presumably succeeded his brother Geoffrey IV as Viscount of Châteaudun in 1176, although it is not certain that Geoffrey was ever viscount. Very little is known about his life except that he sold Vendôme forest land inter Romilliacum et Calviniacum (between Romilly-sur-Aigre and Chauvigny) to the commune of Marmoutier in 1175. Hugh VI took part in the Third Crusade, arriving with the Angevin contingent in June 1191, but died at the siege of Acre.

Hugues married Jeanne de Preuilly, daughter of Gosbert de Preuilly, Seigneur of Bouchet and Guerche, and Adela de Vendôme. Gosbert was the son of Escivard de Preuilly, who in turn was the son of Geoffrey II, Count of Vendôme, and his wife Euphrosine. Hugues and Jeanne had two children:

- Geoffrey V, Viscount of Châteaudun
- Agnes (died after February 1200).

Hughes was succeeded as Viscount of Châteaudun by his son Geoffrey upon his death.

== Sources ==
- Settipani, Christian, Les vicomtes de Châteaudun et leurs alliés, dans Onomastique et Parenté dans l'Occident médiéval, Oxford, Linacre, Unit for Prosopographical Research, 2000
- Europäische Stammtafeln, Vol. III, Les Vicomtes de Châteaudun
