= Hugh IV, Viscount of Châteaudun =

Hugues III (died 1110), Viscount of Châteaudun, son of Rotrou I, Viscount of Châteaudun, and Adelise de Bellême, daughter of Guérin de Domfront. Hughes became Viscount of Châteaudun upon his father's death in 1080.

Hughes donated the church of Saint-Léonard de Bellême to Marmoutier Abbey in 1092, and in 1096, Pope Urban II consecrated the new chapel and preached for the First Crusade.

Hughes married Agnes, Comtesse de Fréteval, daughter of Foucher, Seigneur de Fréteval, and Hildeburge Goët. Hughes and Agnes had three children:

- Mathilde (d. 25 September 1139), married firstly Robert, Viscount of Blois, and secondly Goeffroy III “Grisegonelle” Count of Vendôme, son of Geoffroy II (Jordan), Seigneur de Preuilly, and Euphrosine de Vendôme.
- Geoffrey III, Viscount of Châteaudun
- Fulcois.

Hughes was succeeded as Viscount of Châteaudun by his son Geoffrey upon his death.

== Sources ==
- Evergates, Theodore, ed. (1999). Aristocratic Women in Medieval France. University of Pennsylvania Press.
- Thompson, Kathleen (2002). Power and Border Lordship in Medieval France: The County of the Perche, 1000-1226. The Boydell Press.
