= William II of Perche =

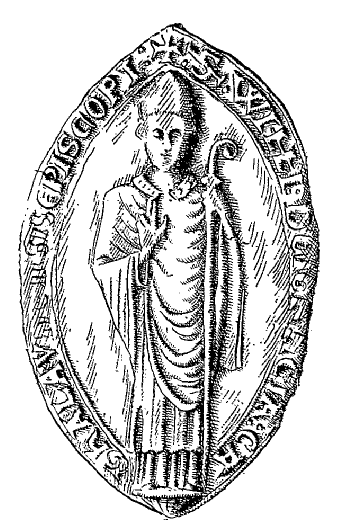
Seal of William II, Count of Perche

William II (died 1226), count of Perche and bishop of Châlons, son of Count Rotrou IV of Perche and Matilda, daughter of Count Theobald II of Champagne and Matilda of Carinthia.

William began his career as treasurer and provost of the Church of St. Martin of Tours, and was elected bishop of Chalons in 1215, consecrated in 1216. The following year he became count of Perche upon the death of his nephew Thomas in the Battle of Lincoln. As count-bishop, William was a valuable advisor to the kings of France and was listed among those by Pope Honorious III to participate in the Albigensian Crusade. His death in February 1226 left the question of the succession to the County of Perche unresolved for years. He left money to his cousin Countess Isabelle of Chartres for the "support of the poor".

== Sources ==
- Berman, Constance Hoffman (2018). The White Nuns: Cistercian Abbeys for Women in Medieval France. University of Pennsylvania Press.
- Fassler, Margot Elsbeth (2010). The Virgin of Chartres: Making History Through Liturgy and the Arts. Yale University Press.
- Thompson, Kathleen (2002). Power and Border Lordship in Medieval France: The County of the Perche, 1000-1226. The Boydell Press.

French nobility
Preceded by Thomas	Count of Perche; 1217–1226	Vacant
