= Hugh of Perche =

11th-century French nobleman

Hugues III (died 1044), Viscount of Châteaudun and Count of Perche (as Hugues I), son of Geoffrey II, Viscount of Châteaudun, I Count of Perche and Helvise de Corbon, daughter of Rainard, Lord of Pithiviers. Virtually nothing is known about his life other than some references of donations to the Abbey of Saint-Denis de Nogent.

Hugues married Adela, from an unknown family, and had no known children. He was succeeded by his brother Rotrou.

== Sources ==
- Settipani, Christian, Les vicomtes de Châteaudun et leurs alliés, dans Onomastique et Parenté dans l'Occident médiéval, Oxford, Linacre, Unit for Prosopographical Research, 2000
