= Geoffrey II of Châteaudun =

9th-10th century nobleman

Geoffrey II (died 1040), Viscount of Châteaudun and Count of Perche (as Geoffrey I), son of Fulcois, Count of Mortagne, and Melisende, Viscountess of Châteaudun. Some sources say that he became Viscount of Châteaudun following his uncle Hugues II’ appointment as Archbishop of Tours. At that point, he was probably under the regency of his mother.

He broke with his relatives in the nobility of Blois and began hostilities against Fulbert, Bishop of Chartres. An unsuccessful attempt to enlist the aid of Theobald III, Count of Blois and Robert the Pious in his quest resulted in his excommunication in 1029. Only his building of the Church of the Holy Sepulchre in Châteaudun redeemed him in the eyes of the church.

In 1040, while he was at Chartres, a riot broke out against his presence and he was murdered.

Geoffrey married Elizabeth or Helvise of Corbon (French: Héloïse de Corbon), daughter of Rainard, Lord of Pithiviers, and his wife Helvise. Geoffrey and Helvise had three children:

- Geoffroy (d. between 1015 and 1028)
- Hugues III, Viscount of Châteaudun, I Count of Perche
- Rotrou II, Count of Perche, I Viscount of Châteaudun.

Geoffrey was succeeded as Viscount of Châteaudun and Count of Perche by his son Hugues.

== Sources ==
- Settipani, Christian, Les vicomtes de Châteaudun et leurs alliés, dans Onomastique et Parenté dans l'Occident médiéval, Oxford, Linacre, Unit for Prosopographical Research, 2000
