= Fulk IV of Anjou =

Count of Anjou (1068 – 1109)

Fulk IV
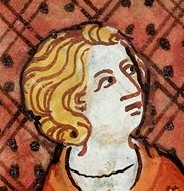

Count of Anjou
- Reign: 1068 – 14 April 1109
- Predecessor: Geoffrey III
- Successor: Fulk V
- Joint rule: Geoffrey IV (until 1106)
- Born: 1043
- Died: 14 April 1109 (aged 65–66)
- Spouses: Hildegarde of Beaugency (m. 1068; died 1070) Ermengarde de Bourbon (m. 1070; div. 1075) Orengarde de Châtelaillon (m. 1076; div. 1080) N de Brienne (m. 1080; div. 1087) Bertrade de Montfort (m. 1089; div. 1092)
- Issue: Ermengarde, Duchess of Brittany; Geoffrey IV, Count of Anjou; Fulk, King of Jerusalem
- House: House of Anjou
- Father: Geoffrey II, Count of Gâtinais
- Mother: Ermengarde of Anjou

Fulk IV (French: Foulques IV d'Anjou; 1043 – 14 April 1109), better known as Fulk le Réchin (Latin: Fulco Rechin), was the count of Anjou from around 1068 until his death. He was noted to be "a man with many reprehensible, even scandalous, habits" by Orderic Vitalis, who particularly objected to his many women and his influential footwear, claiming he popularized the pigaches that eventually became the poulaine, the medieval long-toed shoe.

== Name ==
Fulk was the usual name of the medieval counts of Anjou. It is the English form of the same Germanic masculine given name latinized as Fulco in contemporary accounts and written Foulques in modern French. They are all cognate with the word folk ("people, kin").

Réchin, the epithet by which he is usually known, has no certain translation. Philologists have made numerous and varied suggestions, most but not all negative, including "the Quarreler", "the Rude", "the Sullen", "the Surly", and "the Heroic".

== Life ==
=== Early life ===
Born August 1043, Fulk was the younger son of Geoffrey II, Count of Gâtinais (sometimes known as Aubri), and Ermengarde of Anjou. Ermengarde was a daughter of Fulk the Black, an earlier count of Anjou, and the sister of Geoffrey Martel who inherited Anjou upon his father's death.

Fulk's father died around 1043-1045 while he was still a child, and his mother remarried sometime around 1048-1055 to her second cousin Robert I, Duke of Burgundy. From this marriage was born Fulk's half-sister Hildegarde.

=== Count of Anjou ===
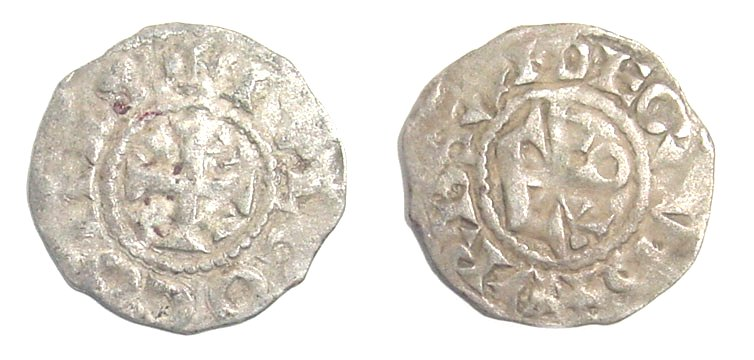
Coins minted by Fulk

Geoffrey Martel died without direct heirs, leaving Anjou to his nephew Geoffrey III, Fulk's older brother. Some sources declare that his rule was incompetent and Fulk contested the succession, capturing Geoffrey in 1067. Under pressure from the church, he released Geoffrey but the two brothers soon fell to fighting again. The next year Geoffrey was again imprisoned by Fulk, this time for good. Fulk then ruled Anjou from 1068 until his death.

Substantial territory was lost to Angevin control due to the difficulties resulting from Geoffrey's poor rule and the brothers' warring. Saintonge was lost, and Fulk had to give the Gâtinais to Philip I of France to placate the king upon his victory. Much of Fulk's rule was devoted to regaining control over this territory and to a complex struggle with Normandy for influence in Maine and Brittany.

At some point before 1106, Fulk made a major gift to the Fontevraud Abbey.

=== Wives ===
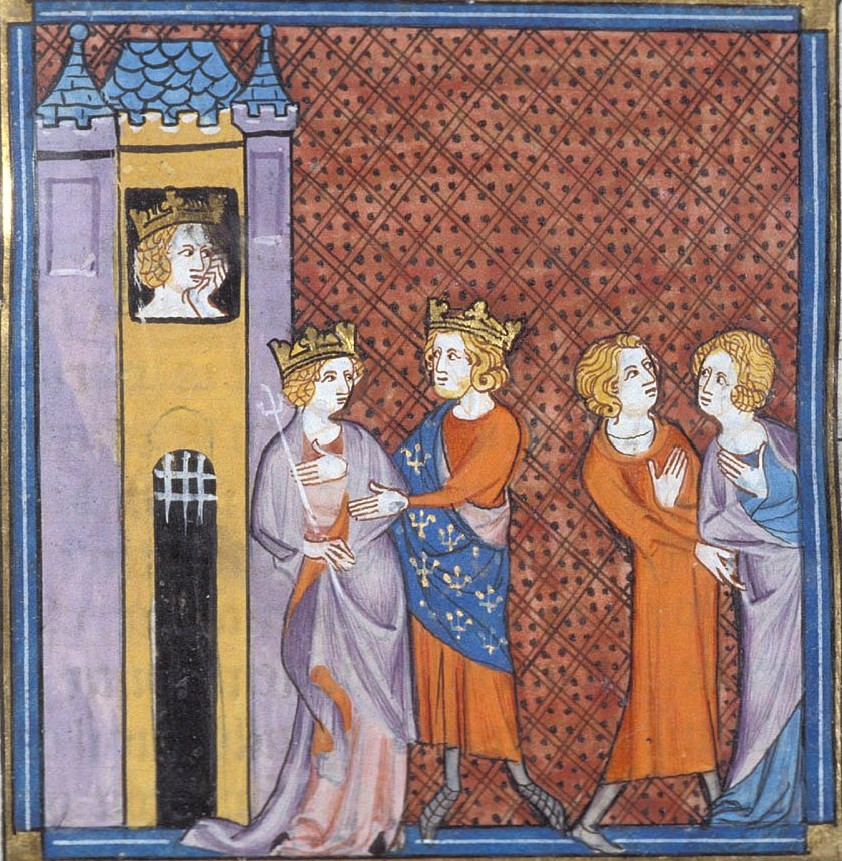
Fulk, King Philip, Bertha, and Bertrade, from the Chronicle of St Denis (14th cent.)

There are conflicting accounts of Fulk's life, including some who pointedly condemned him as "a man with many reprehensible, even scandalous, habits". The clerics of his time particularly objected to his sexual promiscuity or deviance, which included marrying as many as five times, although the exact number of lawful wives, divorces, and repudiations is disputed.

Providing all the claimed formal marriages, he was said to have first wed Hildegarde of Beaugency in 1067. Ermengarde of Anjou, their daughter, later married Alan IV, duke of Brittany, and William IX, duke of Aquitaine. Hildegarde was said to have died c. 1070. Fulk was then said to have married Ermengarde of Bourbon, daughter of its lord Archambaud IV the Strong. Geoffrey IV Martel, their son, ruled jointly with Fulk for some time but died in 1106. Some of the sources state Fulk repudiated Ermengarde in 1075 on the basis of consanguinity. Around 1076, Fulk then wed Orengarde of Châtelaillon, the daughter of its lord Isambert or Isembard. He is said to have repudiated her in 1080, again on grounds of consanguinity. He was then said to have married a daughter of Walter I, Count of Brienne by 1080. He was said to have divorced this woman, whose name was not recorded in surviving accounts, in 1087.

Most scandalously, he was said to have married Bertrade, daughter of Simon I, lord of Montfort, in 1089. He extorted Robert Curthose for support of the marriage in exchange for his assistance with rebel Manceaux, which ultimately required Robert to restore the lands of Ralph the Asshead to Bertrade's guardian William of Évreux. Bertrade bore him Fulk V, who later became count of Anjou and king of the Crusader realm of Jerusalem, before 1092, when she either abandoned Fulk in favor of King Philip I or was abducted by the king. (Accounts vary.) Apparently bigamously, she married the king and became queen of France on 15 May 1092. She was said to have fully reconciled Fulk with the king and the situation.

=== Death ===
Fulk died on 14 April 1109 leaving the restoration of the county of Anjou as it had been under Geoffrey III to his successors.

== Works ==
A Latin history of Anjou and its rulers—surviving only in part and now known as A Partial History of Anjou (Fragmentum Historiae Andegavensis)—are said to have been written by Fulk in 1096, although both the authorship and authenticity of the work are disputed. The first part of the work describing Fulk's ancestry and some of his ancestor's deeds is extant. This part of the text is interrupted by Fulk's description of the arrival in Anjou of Pope Urban II, who was at the time of a tour of western France to preach the First Crusade. Fulk alleges that Urban gave him a golden rose, a ceremonial gift reserved for the greatest allies of the church. A second part which would have dealt with Fulk's own times—if it were ever written—has been lost. If he wrote it, it would have been one of the first works of history in medieval Europe written by a layman rather than a cleric. Some features of the text suggest that Fulk may have dictated it to a scribe. Scholars have suggested that Fulk's reason for writing down a history of his own times was the knowledge that Urban was planning to visit Anjou and was going to appeal for him to release his brother Geoffrey III from captivity, reigniting the question of Fulk's legitimacy as count. Fulk's concern to relate his descent from the earliest counts and his promise to tell the story of his reign could be seen as an extraordinary response to the potential arguments raised by Urban's visit and Geoffrey's potential liberation.

== Legacy ==
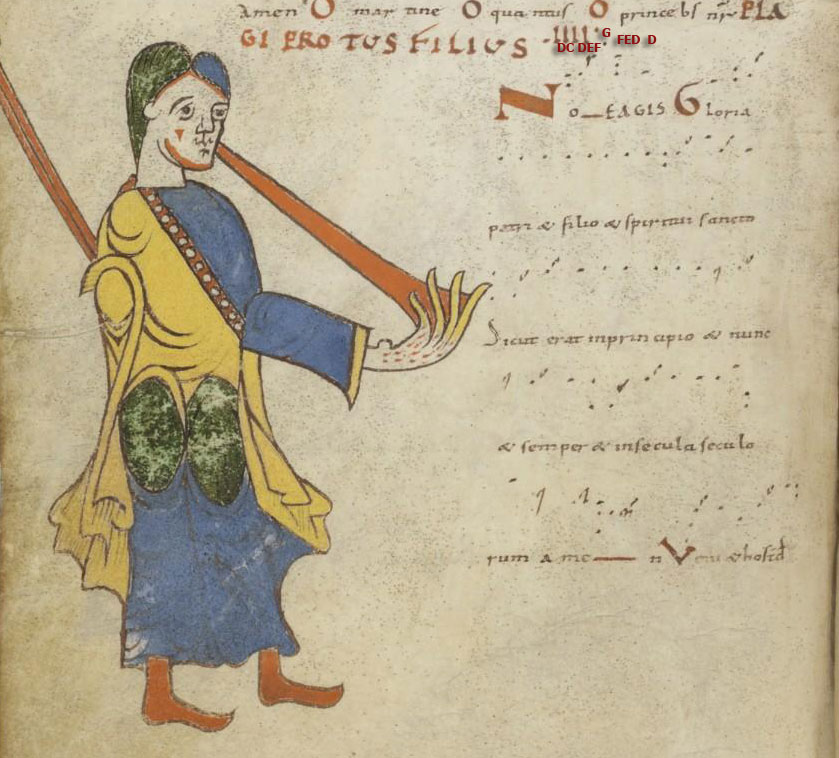
Pigaches in an 11th cent. illumination from an Aquitaine tonary

Amid his other denunciations of Fulk, the English historian Orderic Vitalis blamed him for the invention of pigaches, the pointy-toed "scorpion-tail" shoes, which became fashionable in France and England around this time and later developed into the unwieldy elongated poulaines. Supposedly Fulk began wearing narrow shoes with lengthened toes as a way of hiding his unsightly bunions from his 5th wife Bertrade before she abandoned him in favor of the king. (The fashion historian Ruth Wilcox offers that it may have been a simple adaptation of the Normans' sabatons, which they had extended to a point and turned down in the late 11th century to better hold their stirrups during battle.) In any case, the footwear was considered vain and obscene—if not demonic—and were immensely unpopular with the church leadership of the period. St Anselm banned its use by English clerics at the 1102 Synod of Westminster, the papal legate Robert de Courson banned its use by the faculty of the University of Paris in August 1215, and the Fourth Lateran Council finally banned them for all Catholic clergy the same year.

Preceded by Geoffrey III	Count of Anjou with Geoffrey IV; 1068–1109	Succeeded by Fulk V
