= Melisende, Viscountess of Châteaudun =

Melisende (died before 1040), was the ruling Viscountess of Châteaudun in 1026–1030.

She was the daughter of Hugh I, Viscount of Châteaudun, and Hildegarde of Perche. She inherited the fief from her brother in 1026.

Very little is known about Melisende. The only written record concerns the donation of the Church of Champrond in Nogent-le-Rotrou (the former capital of Perche) in the first year of the reign of Henry I of France by her son Geoffrey.

Melisende married Fulcois, Count of Mortagne, son of Rotrou, Seigneur de Nogent. Melisende and Fulcois had two children:

- Geoffrey II, Viscount of Châteaudun and Count of Perche
- Hugues, married Béatrice de Mâcon, widow and heiress of the Count of Gâtinais.

She was succeeded by her son Geoffrey as Viscount of Châteaudun in 1030.

== Sources ==
- Kerrebrouck, Patrick van., Nouvelle histoire généalogique de l'auguste maison de France, vol. 1: La Préhistoire des Capétiens. 1993.
