= Geoffrey II of Perche =

Geoffrey II (died October 1100), Count of Mortagne and Count of Perche, was the son of Rotrou I, Viscount of Châteaudun, and Adelise de Bellême, daughter of Guérin de Domfron. Geoffrey was Count of Mortagne and Seigneur of Nogent from 1060 to 1090, and Count of Perche from 1090 until his death.

As a young man, Geoffrey participated in the conquest of England and fought at the Battle of Hastings. For his service, William the Conqueror gave him a reward of significant property in England.

Geoffrey succeeded his father in 1080, receiving the Percheron fields (Mortagne-au-Perche and Nogent-le-Rotrou), while his younger brother Hugues received Châteaudun. A third brother, Rotrou, acquired by marriage the lordship of Montfort-le-Rotrou. One of his first actions as count was to hand over the monastery of Nogent-le-Rotrou to Cluny, after engineering the deposition of its abbot Hubert. As a result, the role of the count's court an increased role, since disputes about the abbey's endowment were solved at that court.

About 1089, Geoffrey waged war on Robert of Bellême, due to a land dispute. According to Orderic Vitalis, Geoffrey contested the distribution of the Belleme inheritance between Mabel de Bellême (Robert's mother) and Adeliza (his mother). The war was long and protracted, as even in 1091 we know the conflict was still going on. He devoted the rest of his life to religious pursuits, and founded the first leper colony in Perche.

His successful rule and increased political role can be appreciated from his dynastic alliances, which ranged far into northern France (with his wife Beatrix), Normandy (with the marriage of his daughter Marguerite to Henry de Beaumont) and southern France (through his daughter Matilde's marriage to the viscount of Turenne).

Geoffrey married Beatrix de Ramerupt, daughter of Hilduin IV, Count of Montdidier and Alice de Roucy. Geoffrey and Beatrix had:

- Rotrou III the Great, Count of Perche
- Marguerite (d. after 1156), married to Henry de Beaumont, 1st Earl of Warwick. Their sons included Roger de Beaumont, 2nd Earl of Warwick, Robert de Neubourg and Rotrou, Archbishop of Rouen.
- Juliana du Perche (d. after 1132), married to Gilbert, Lord of d’Aigle. They had two sons, Geoffrey and Engenulf, who died in the wreck of the White Ship. Their daughter was Marguerite de l’Aigle, who married García Ramírez, King of Navarre.
- Mathilde (d. 27 May 1143), married first Raymond I, Vicomte de Turenne and, widowed, Guy IV de Lastours.

Orderic Vitalis gives him high praise: In time of peace he was gentle and lovable and conspicuous for his good manners; in times of war, harsh and successful, formidable to the rulers who were his neighbours and an enemy to all.

Geoffrey was succeeded by his son Rotrou as Count of Perche upon his death.

== Sources ==
- Barlow, Frank (1983). William Rufus. University of California Press.
- Guenée, Bernard (May–June 1978). "Les généalogies entre l'histoire et la politique: la fierté d'être Capétien, en France, au Moyen Age" (PDF). Annales: Histoire, Sciences Sociales. 33 (3): 450–477. doi:10.3406/ahess.1978.293943.
- Thompson, Kathleen (2002). Power and Border Lordship in Medieval France: The County of the Perche, 1000-1226. The Boydell Press.
