= Geoffrey III of Anjou =

Count of Anjou in the 11th century

Geoffrey III of Anjou (in French Geoffroy III d' Anjou) (c. 1040–1096), called le Barbu ("the Bearded"), was the Count of Anjou 1060–68.

== Early life ==
Geoffrey, born c. 1040, was the eldest son of Geoffrey II, Count of Gâtinais and Ermengarde of Anjou, the daughter of Fulk III of Anjou. Both he and his younger brother Fulk, called le Réchin, were taken under the wing of their uncle, Geoffrey Martel and both were knighted by him in 1060. Although well treated by his uncle, it is thought that Geoffrey Martel preferred his younger nephew, Fulk, but nonetheless left the countship to Geoffrey. Geoffrey III would serve as Count of Anjou until the Countship was taken from him by his brother, Fulk.

== Military career ==
He succeeded his uncle Geoffrey Martel in 1060, but it shortly became clear to his vassals he was not nearly as competent as his uncle had been. He had given his younger brother Fulk Saintonge as an appanage but in 1062, when it was attacked by Count Guy-Geoffrey of Poitou (aka William VIII), Geoffrey failed to come to Fulk's support and Saintonge was lost. In 1063 the county of Maine was lost to Anjou as well. In 1064 Geoffrey failed to come to the aid of one of his vassals, Rainaldus of Chateau-Gontier, (Note: See Renaud Ier de Château-Gontier (French Wikipedia)) who was captured by the Bretons. (Note: These were the bretons who comprised the army of Conan II, Duke of Brittany, who died at Château-Gontier after the battle, possibly due to poisoning.) In 1065 Geoffrey alienated Archbishop Barthelemy by trying to force his own choice for Bishop of Le Mans on the church. In turn the archbishop excommunicated Geoffrey.

As the situation in Anjou deteriorated Fulk IV quarreled with his brother Geoffrey. In 1067 Fulk rebelled and took the county from Geoffrey, briefly imprisoning him. In 1068 Geoffrey attacked Fulk, and once again was defeated. This time Geoffrey was imprisoned where he remained for 28 years. He was finally freed by the intervention of Pope Urban II in 1096, but died soon after.

== Family ==
He married Julienne de Langeais before 1060. She died after 7 August 1067. They had no issue.

Geoffrey and Fulk's sister, Hildegarde married Joscelin I, Lord of Courtenay and had issue.

== Notes ==
Preceded by Geoffrey II	Count of Anjou; 1060–1068	Succeeded by Fulk IV
