= Ermengarde of Anjou, Duchess of Burgundy =

Ermengarde of Anjou

Duchess consort of Burgundy
- Tenure: 1046/1048 – 18 March 1076
- Born: c. 1018; Angers
- Died: 18 March 1076; Fleurey-sur-Ouche
- Spouse: Geoffrey II, Count of Gâtinais; Robert I, Duke of Burgundy
- Issue: With Geoffrey; Hildegarde de Château-Landon; Geoffrey III, Count of Anjou; Fulk IV, Count of Anjou; With Robert; Hildegarde of Burgundy
- House: Ingelger
- Father: Fulk III of Anjou
- Mother: Hildegarde of Sundgau

Ermengarde of Anjou (c. 1018 – 18 March 1076), known as Blanche, was a Duchess consort of Burgundy. She was the daughter of Count Fulk III of Anjou and Hildegarde of Sundgau. She was sometimes known as Ermengarde-Blanche.

She married Geoffrey II, Count of Gâtinais c. 1035 (in French Geoffroy), called Ferréol and sometimes known as Aubri, seigneur de Château-Landon. Together they had:

- Hildegarde de Château-Landon, married c.1060 to Joscelin I, Lord of Courtenay
- Geoffrey III, Count of Anjou
- Fulk IV, Count of Anjou

Geoffrey II died sometime between 1043 and 1046, and Ermengarde's mother died while on pilgrimage to Jerusalem in 1046.

Ermengarde married Robert I, Duke of Burgundy in 1046, conferring on her the title Duchess of Burgundy. They had:

- Hildegarde (c. 1056–1104), who married Duke William VIII of Aquitaine around 1067

Ermengarde died 18 March 1076, at the Church of Fleurey-sur-Ouche.

== Sources ==
- Bachrach, Bernard S. (1993). Fulk Nerra, the Neo-Roman Consul, 987-1040: A Political Biography of the Angevin Count. University of California Press.
- Berg, Dieter (2003). Die Anjou-Plantagenets: Die englischen Könige im Europa des Mittelalters (1100-1400) (in German). Kohlhammer Verlag.
- Bouchard, Constance Brittain (1987). Sword, Miter, and Cloister: Nobility and the Church in Burgundy, 980-1198. Cornell University Press.
- Commire, Anne; Klezmer, Deborah, eds. (2000). Women in World History. Vol. Ead–Fur. Yorkin Publications.
- Duby, Georges (1981). The Knight, the Lady and the Priest. University of Chicago Press.
