= Geoffrey II of Gâtinais =

French noble (ancestor of English kings)

Geoffrey II de Château-Landon (died 1043 or 1046) was the count of Gâtinais. He was the son of Hugues du Perche, Count of Gâtinais, and of Béatrice de Mâcon, the daughter of Aubry II de Mâcon. He was one of the first known ancestors in male line of the Plantagenets.

About 1035, he married Ermengarde of Anjou, Duchess of Burgundy, daughter of Fulk III, Count of Anjou. After Geoffrey's death she married secondly Robert I, Duke of Burgundy.

== Issue ==
Together, Geoffrey and Ermengarde had:

- Hildegarde de Château-Landon, married c.1060 to Joscelin I, Lord of Courtenay; his famous son was Joscelin I, Count of Edessa by a different wife.
- Geoffrey III (1040–1096)
- Fulk IV (1043–1109)
