= Château d'Amboise =

Château in Indre-et-Loire, France

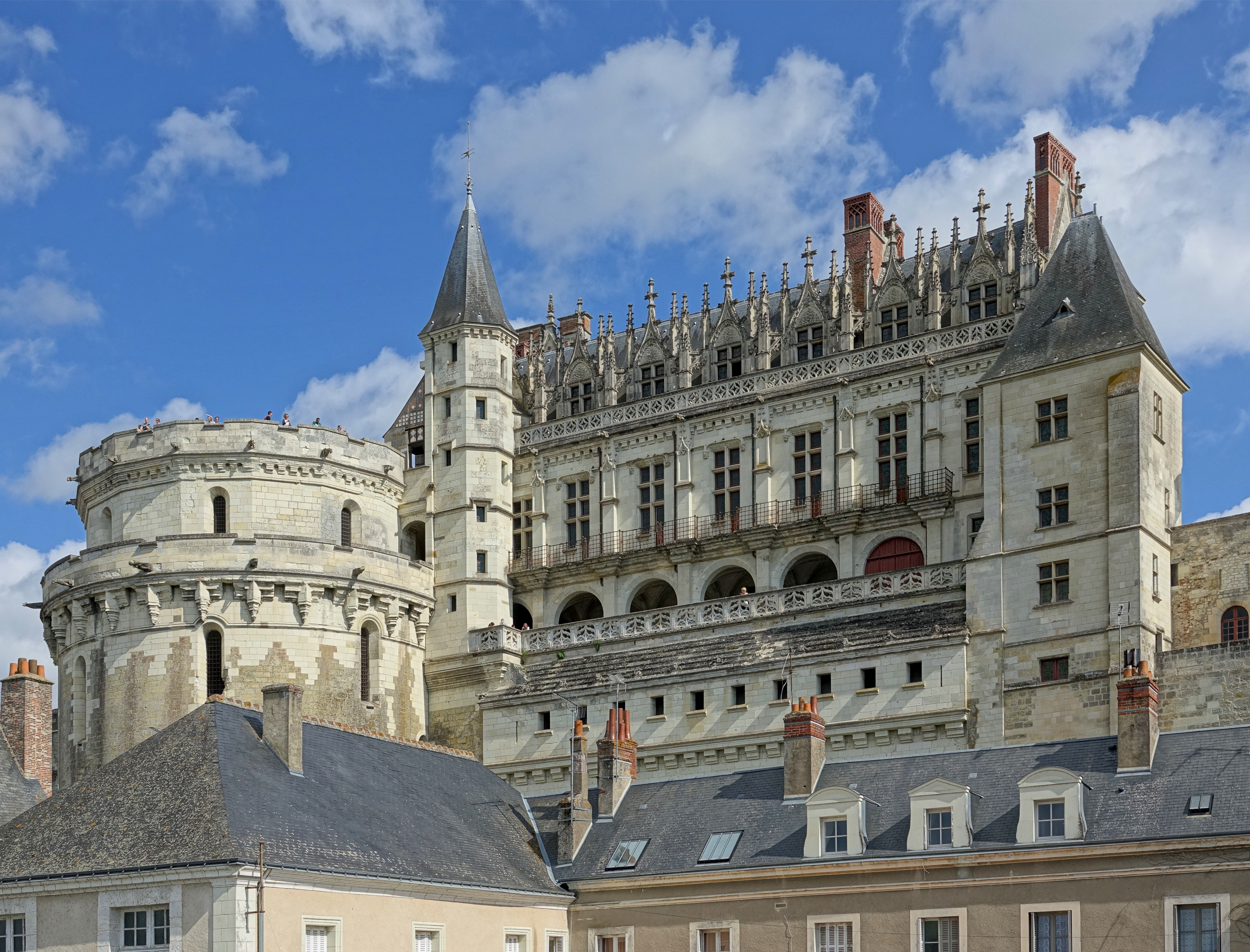
- The Château d'Amboise overlooking the river Loire

- Location within France
- Alternative names: Château of Amboise; Amboise Castle

General information
- Architectural style: Gothic architecture French Renaissance architecture
- Location: Amboise, Indre-et-Loire, France
- Coordinates: 47°24′49″N 0°59′10″E

The Château d'Amboise (French pronunciation: [ʃato dɑ̃bwaz]) is a château in Amboise, in the Indre-et-Loire department of the Loire Valley in France. Confiscated by the monarchy in the 15th century, it became a favoured royal residence and was extensively rebuilt. King Charles VIII died at the château in 1498 after hitting his head on a door lintel. The château fell into decline from the second half of the 16th century and the majority of the interior buildings were later demolished, but some survived and have been restored, along with the outer defensive circuit of towers and walls. It has been recognised as a monument historique by the French Ministry of Culture since 1840.

== History ==
=== Origins ===
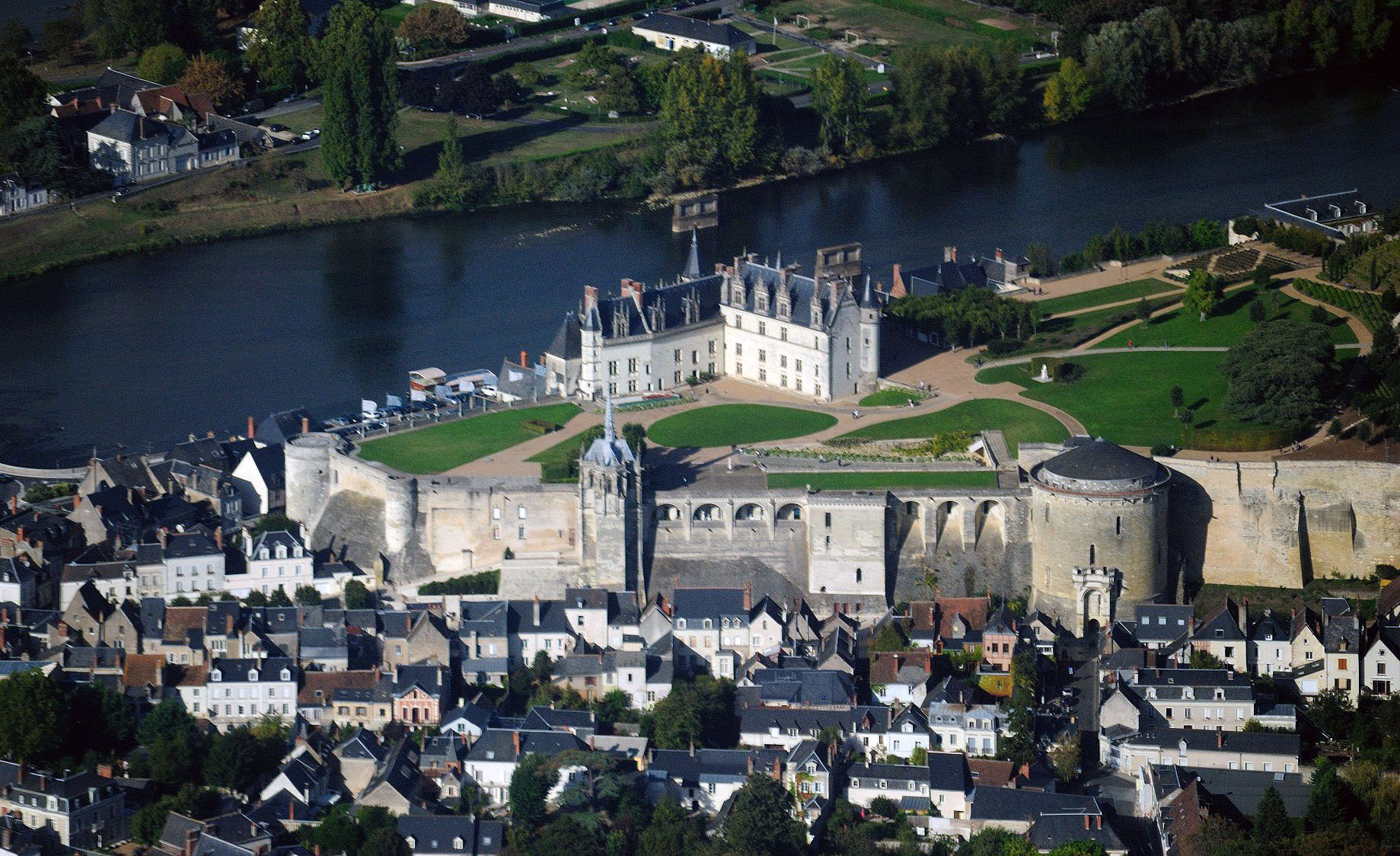
The château seen from the south

The Château d'Amboise was built on a spur above the river Loire. The strategic qualities of the site were recognised before the medieval construction of the Château, a Gallic oppidum previously occupied the site. In the late 9th century Ingelger was made viscount of Orléans, and through his mother was related to Hugh the Abbot, tutors to the French kings. Ingelgarius married Adelais of Amboise, a member of a prominent family (a bishop and archbishop were her uncles) who controlled Château d'Amboise. He was later made Count of Anjou his rise can be attributed to his political connections and reputation as a soldier. The Château d'Amboise would pass through Ingelger and Adelais' heirs, he was succeeded by their son, Fulk the Red. As Fulk the Red expanded his territory, Amboise, Loches, and Villentrois formed the core of his possessions. Amboise lay on the eastern frontier of the Angevins holdings.

Amboise and its castle descended through the family to Fulk Nerra in 987. Fulk had to contend with the ambitions of Odo I, Count of Blois who wanted to expand his own territory into Anjou. Odo I could call on the support of many followers and instructed Conan, Count of Rennes, Gelduin of Saumur, and Abbot Robert of Saint-Florent de Saumur to harass Fulk's properties. While Conan was busy on Anjou's western border, Gelduin and Robert attempted to isolate the easternmost castles of Amboise and Loches by raiding the Saumurois and disrupting communications. To further threaten Amboise, fortifications were erected at Chaumont and Montsoreau, while Saint-Aignan was garrisoned.

There is a 12th-century Book of the Construction of the Castle of Amboise and the Deeds of Its Lords.

=== Royal residence ===
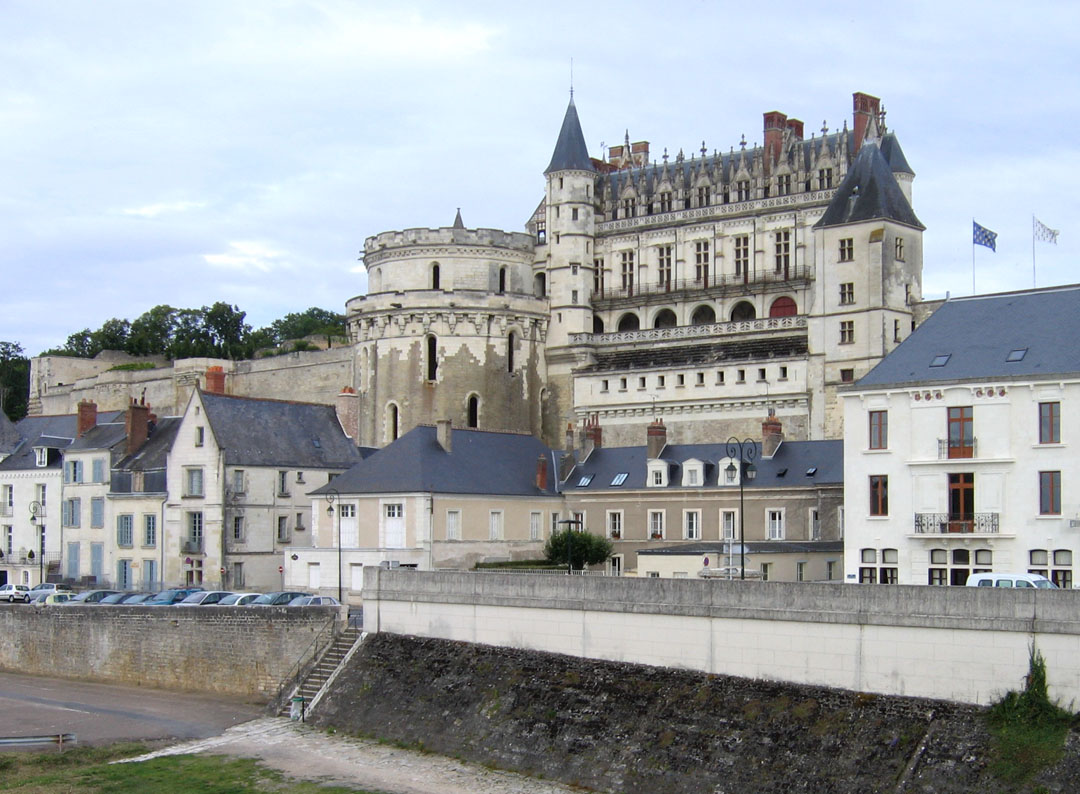
The château rises above its surrounding town

Expanded and improved over time, on 4 September 1434 it was seized by Charles VII of France, after its owner, Louis d'Amboise, Viscount of Thours (1392–1469), was convicted of plotting against Louis XI and condemned to be executed in 1431. However, the King pardoned him but took his château at Amboise. Once in royal hands, the château became a favourite of French kings, from Louis XI to Francis I. Charles VIII decided to rebuild it extensively, beginning in 1492 at first in the French late Gothic Flamboyant style and then after 1495 employing two Italian mason-builders, Domenico da Cortona and Fra Giocondo, who provided at Amboise some of the first Renaissance decorative motifs seen in French architecture. The names of three French builders are preserved in the documents: Colin Biart, Guillaume Senault and Louis Armangeart.

Following the Italian War of 1494–1495, Charles brought Italian architects and artisans to France to work on the château, and turn it into "the first Italianate palace in France". Among the people Charles brought from Italy was Pacello da Mercogliano who designed the gardens at the Châteaux of Ambois and Blois; his work was highly influential amongst French landscape designers. Charles died at Château d'Amboise in 1498 after he hit his head on a door lintel. Before his death he had the upper terrace widened to hold a larger parterre and enclosed with latticework and pavilions; his successor, Louis XII, built a gallery round the terrace which can be seen in the 1576 engraving by Jacques Androuet du Cerceau, in Les plus excellens bastimens de France. The parterres have been recreated in the twentieth century as rectangles of lawns set in gravel and a formal bosquet of trees.

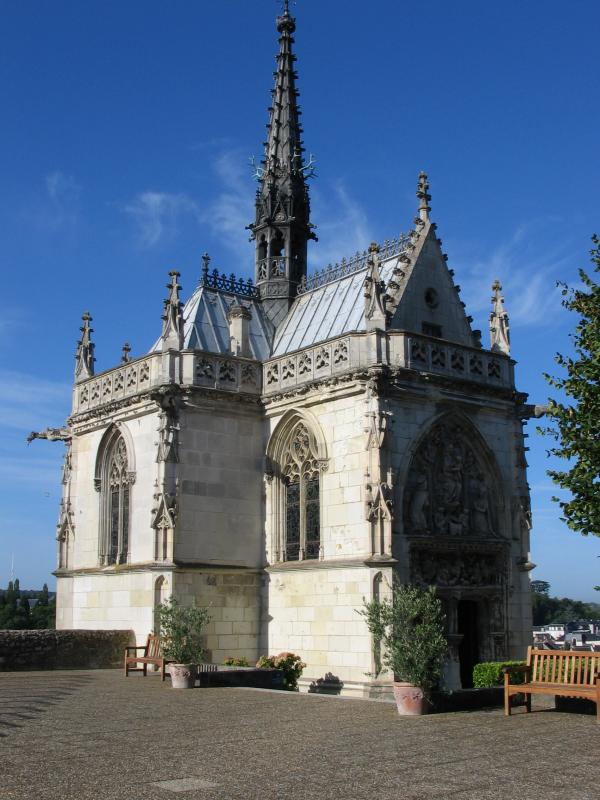
The chapel of Saint Hubert (1493), where Leonardo da Vinci is believed to be buried

King Francis I was raised at Amboise, which belonged to his mother, Louise of Savoy, and during the first few years of his reign, the château reached the pinnacle of its glory. As a guest of the King, Leonardo da Vinci came to Château d'Amboise in December 1515 and lived and worked in the nearby Clos Lucé, connected to the château by an underground passage. Records show that at the time of Leonardo da Vinci's death on 2 May 1519, he was buried in the Chapel of St Florentin, originally located (before it was razed at the end of 18th century) approximately 100 metres (330 ft) northeast of the Chapel of St Hubert. This Chapel of St Florentin belonged to the royal castle and lay within the stone fortifications surrounding the property of the Château d'Amboise, and it should not be confused with the nearby Église Saint Florentin, also in Amboise, but not located within the property boundaries of the Château d'Amboise.

After the French Revolution (1789–1799), the Chapel of St Florentin was in such a ruinous state that the engineer appointed by Napoleon decided that it was not worth preserving and had it demolished. The remaining stonework was used to repair the Château d'Amboise. Some 60 years later (and 330 years after Leonardo's death and original burial), the foundational site of the Chapel of St Florentin was excavated: it is alleged that a complete skeleton was found, with fragments of a stone inscription containing some of the letters of his name. However, other accounts describe heaps of bones (as is customary in chapels throughout France) and even anecdotes of children kicking skulls around for fun and games. Nonetheless, based on some contemporaneous accounts, it is the collection of bones that were found to be whole and with an extraordinarily large skull that are supposed to be buried in the Chapel of Saint Hubert, where now a large floor-level marble stone bearing a metal medallion relief portrait of Leonardo da Vinci (based on the "Melzi's portrait") and the words LEONARDO DA VINCI seem indicative of his final resting place.

Henry II and his wife, Catherine de' Medici, raised their children in the Château d'Amboise, along with Mary Stuart, the child Queen of Scotland who had been promised in marriage to the future French Francis II.

=== Amboise conspiracy ===
In 1560, during the French Wars of Religion, a conspiracy by members of the Huguenot House of Bourbon against the House of Guise that virtually ruled France in the name of the young Francis II was uncovered by Francis, Duke of Guise and stifled by a series of hangings, which took a month to carry out. By the time it was finished, 1,200 Protestants were gibbetted, strung from the town walls, hung from the iron hooks that held pennants and tapestries on festive occasions and from the very balcony of the Logis du Roy. The Court soon had to leave the town because of the smell of corpses.

The abortive peace of Amboise was signed at Amboise on 12 March 1563, between Louis I, Prince of Condé, who had been implicated in the conspiracy to abduct the king, and Catherine de' Medici. The "edict of pacification", as it was termed, authorised Protestant services only in chapels of seigneurs and justices, with the stipulation that such services be held outside the walls of towns. Neither side was satisfied by this compromise, nor was it widely honoured.

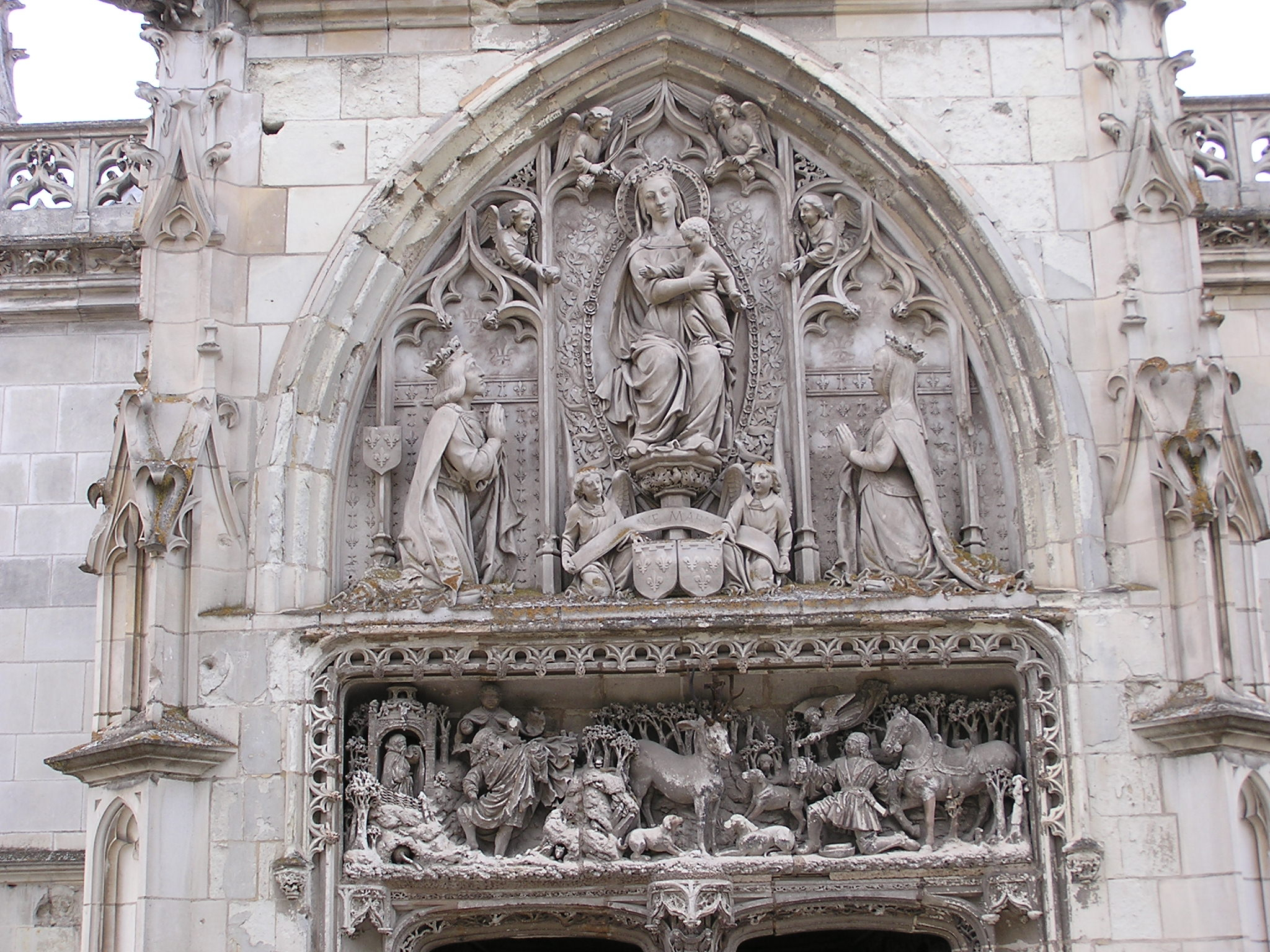
Detail of Late Gothic carving on the Chapel of Saint-Hubert

=== Decline ===
Amboise never returned to royal favour. At the beginning of the 17th century, the huge château was all but abandoned when the property passed into the hands of Gaston, Duke of Orléans, the brother of the Bourbon King Louis XIII. After his death it returned to the Crown and was turned into a prison during the Fronde, and under Louis XIV it held disgraced minister Nicolas Fouquet and the duc de Lauzun. Louis XV made a gift of it to his minister Étienne François de Choiseul, Duke of Choiseul, who had recently purchased the Château de Chanteloup to the west. The Duke of Penthièvre, a minor royal, bought it after Choiseul's death. At his own death in 1793, the castle was confiscated by the State. Emperor Napoleon Bonaparte gifted Amboise to Roger Ducos who, after an engineering assessment, decided to destroy a large part of the castle in order to reduce its costs. Ducos was himself exiled in 1816 and Amboise was recovered by the Duchess of Orléans, Penthièvre's daughter and mother of future King Louis Philippe I.

Since 1840, the Château d'Amboise has been listed as a monument historique by the French Ministry of Culture. King Louis-Philippe began restoring it during his reign but with his abdication in 1848, the château was confiscated by the government. The captive Emir Abd Al-Qadir, who resisted the French colonisation of Algeria, and an entourage of family and retainers were transferred to Château d'Amboise in November 1848. In 1852 an article in Bentley's Miscellany noted that before Abd Al-Qadir took up residence in the château, it had frequently been visited by tourists.

Amboise, a few years since, was a smiling, lively little town, and the castle was a pleasure residence of the last king; the gardens were delicious, the little chapter of St. Hubert a gem, restored in all its lustre, and the glory of artists and amateurs. All is now changed: a gloom has fallen on the scene, the flowers are faded, the gates are closed, they pretty pavilions are shut-up; there are guards instead of gardeners, and a dreary prison frowns over the reflecting waters, which glide mournfully past the towers.

— Bentley's Miscellany, 1852

Later that year, in October, President Louis-Napoléon Bonaparte visited Abd al-Qadir at Amboise to give him the news of his release. In 1873, Louis-Philippe's heirs were given control of the property and a major effort to repair it was made, directed by Eugène Viollet-le-Duc. During the German invasion in 1940 the château was damaged further. Today, the present Count of Paris, a descendant of Louis-Philippe, repairs and maintains the château through the Fondation Saint-Louis.

== Gallery ==
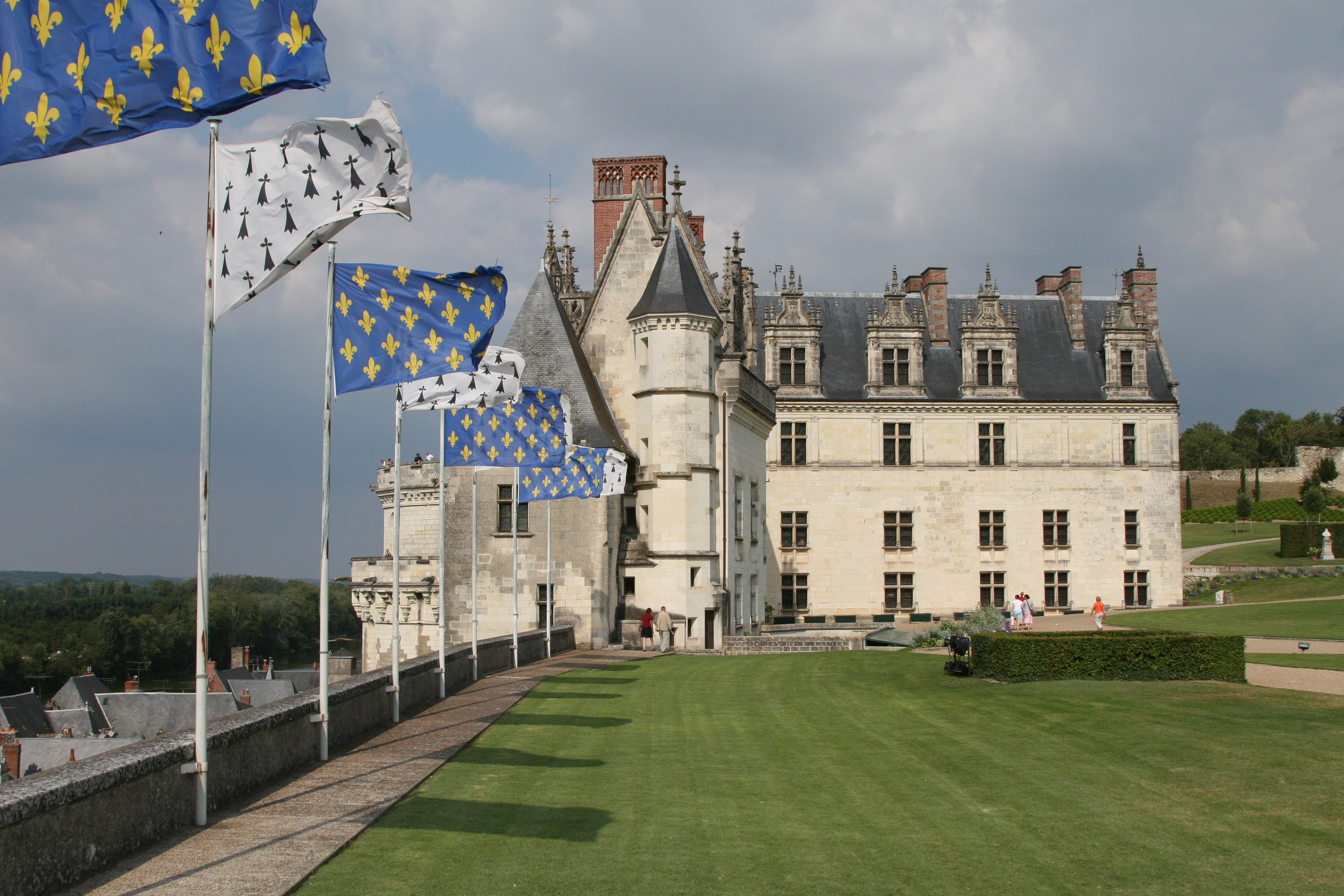
Château d'Amboise

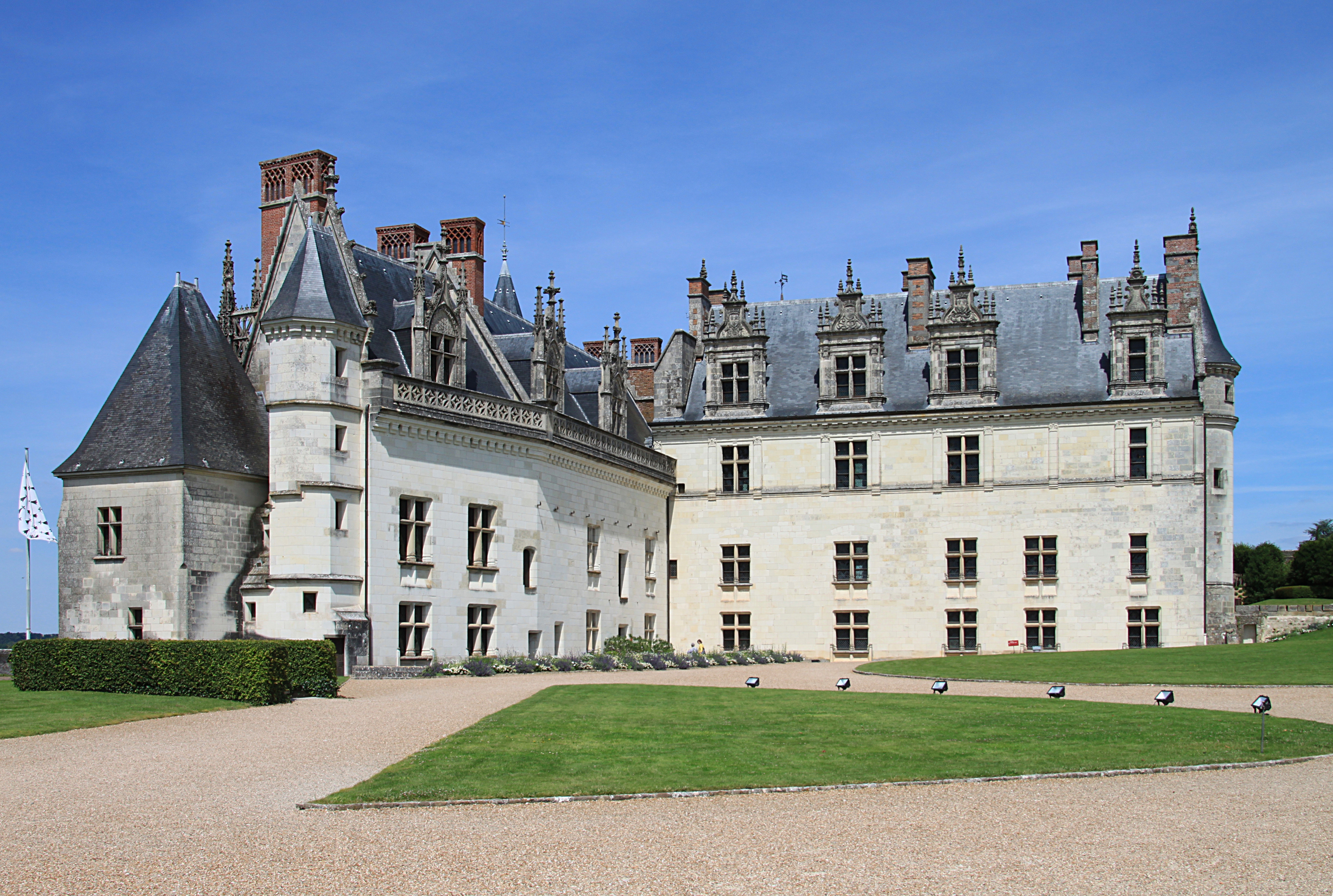
Another view of the Château

The Château as seen from the gardens

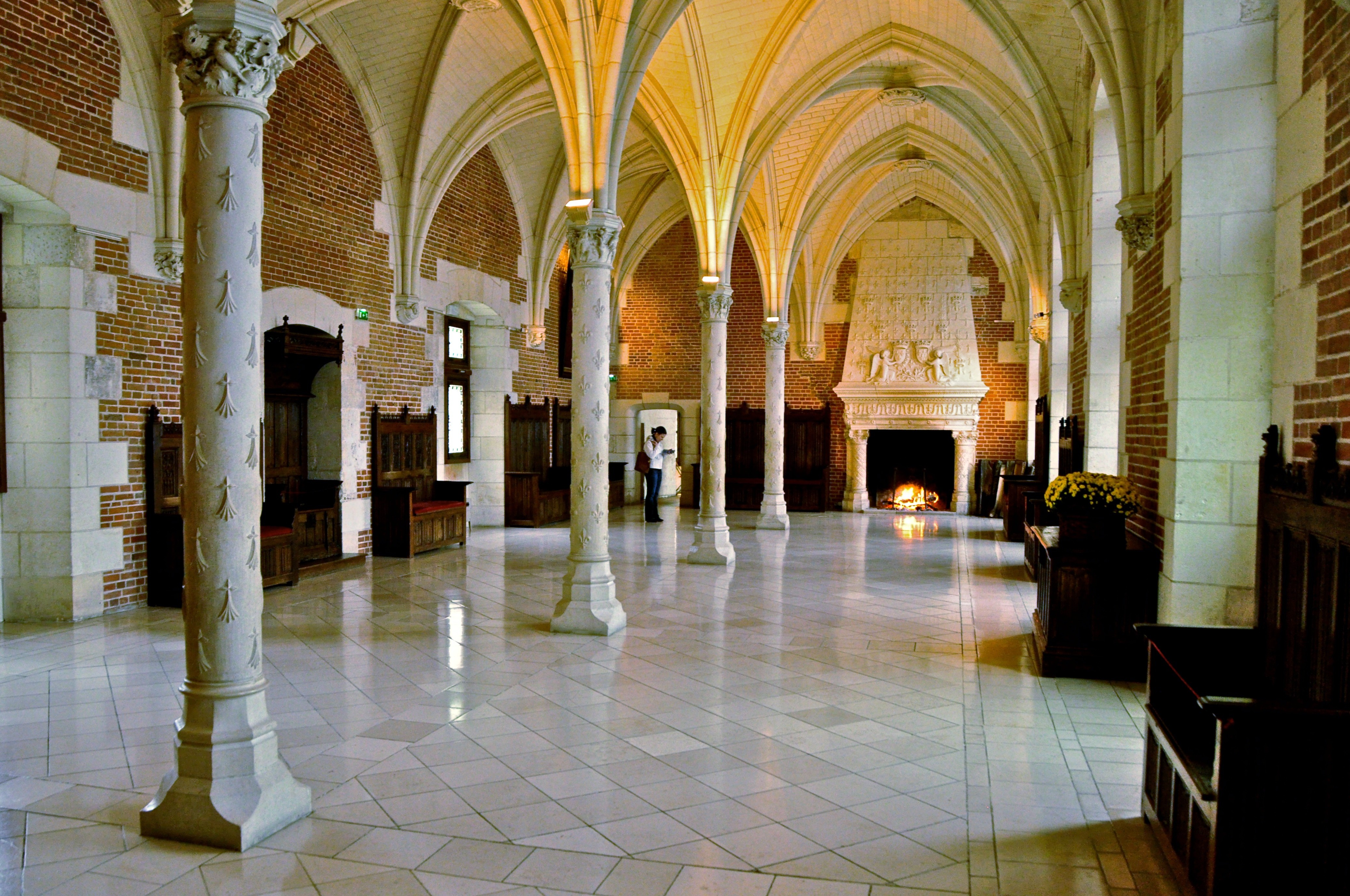
Salle du Conseil

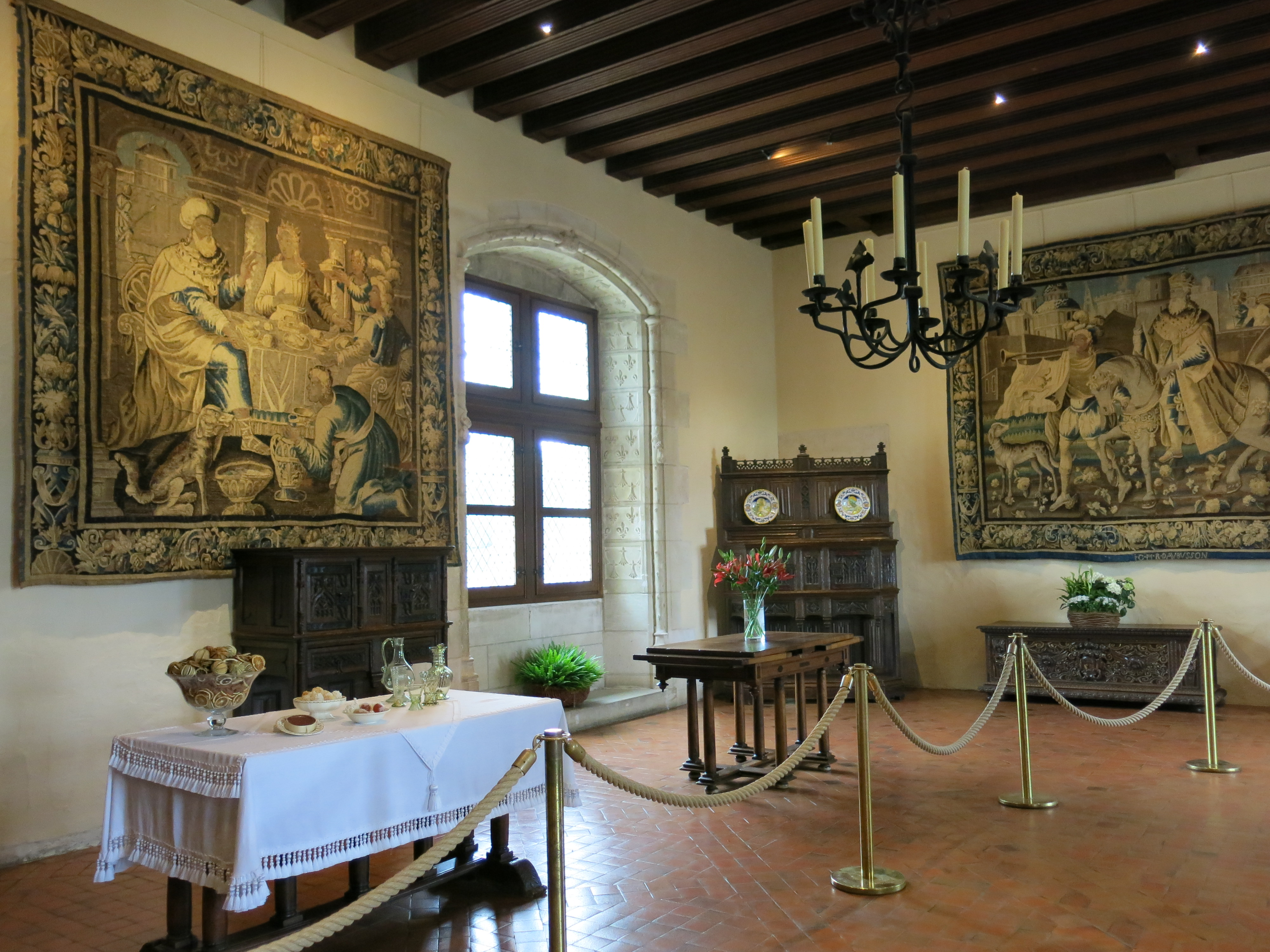
Salle de lʼÉchanson

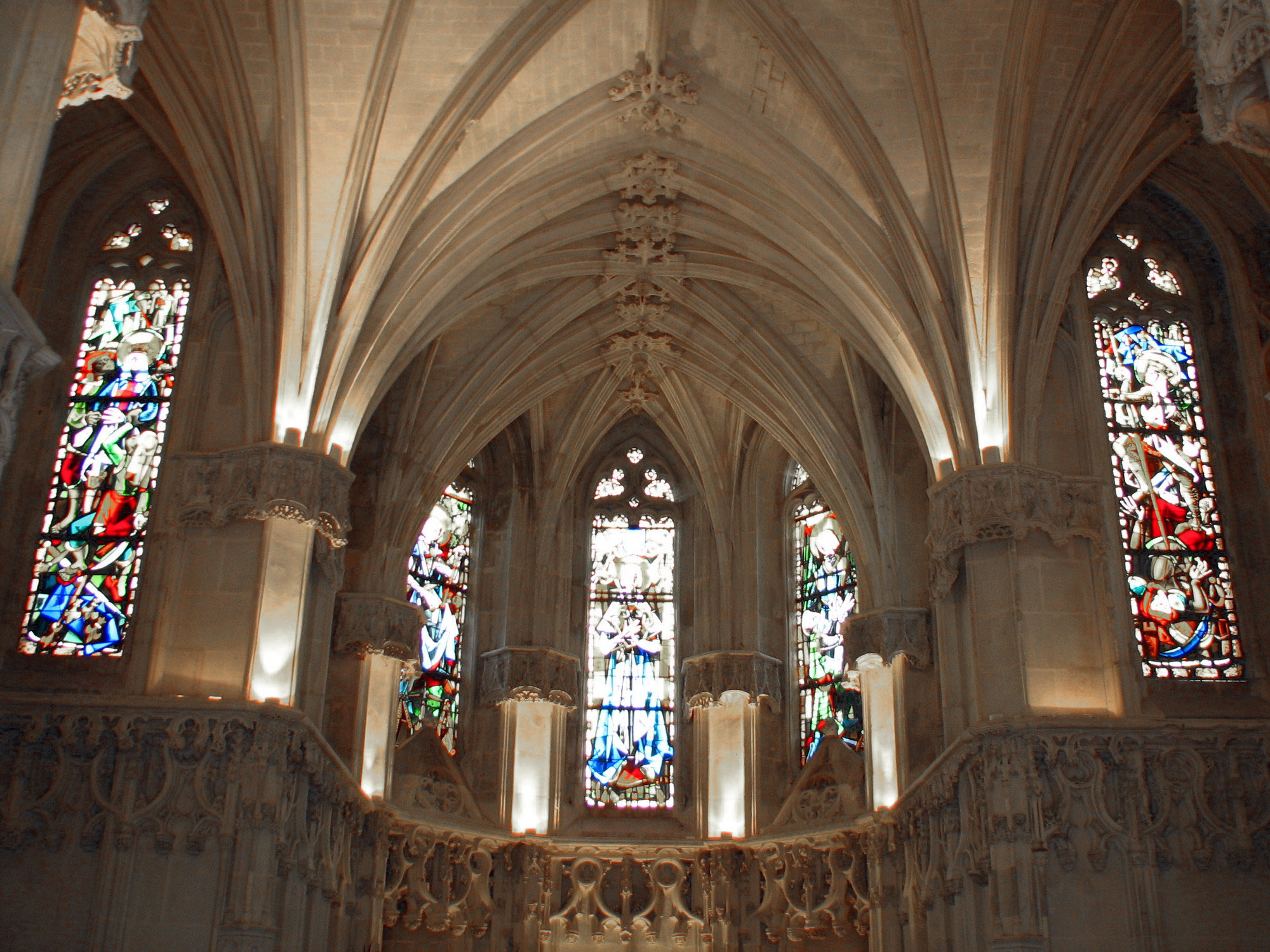
Stained glass in the chapel of Saint-Hubert

Leonardo da Vinci tomb in the chapel of Saint-Hubert

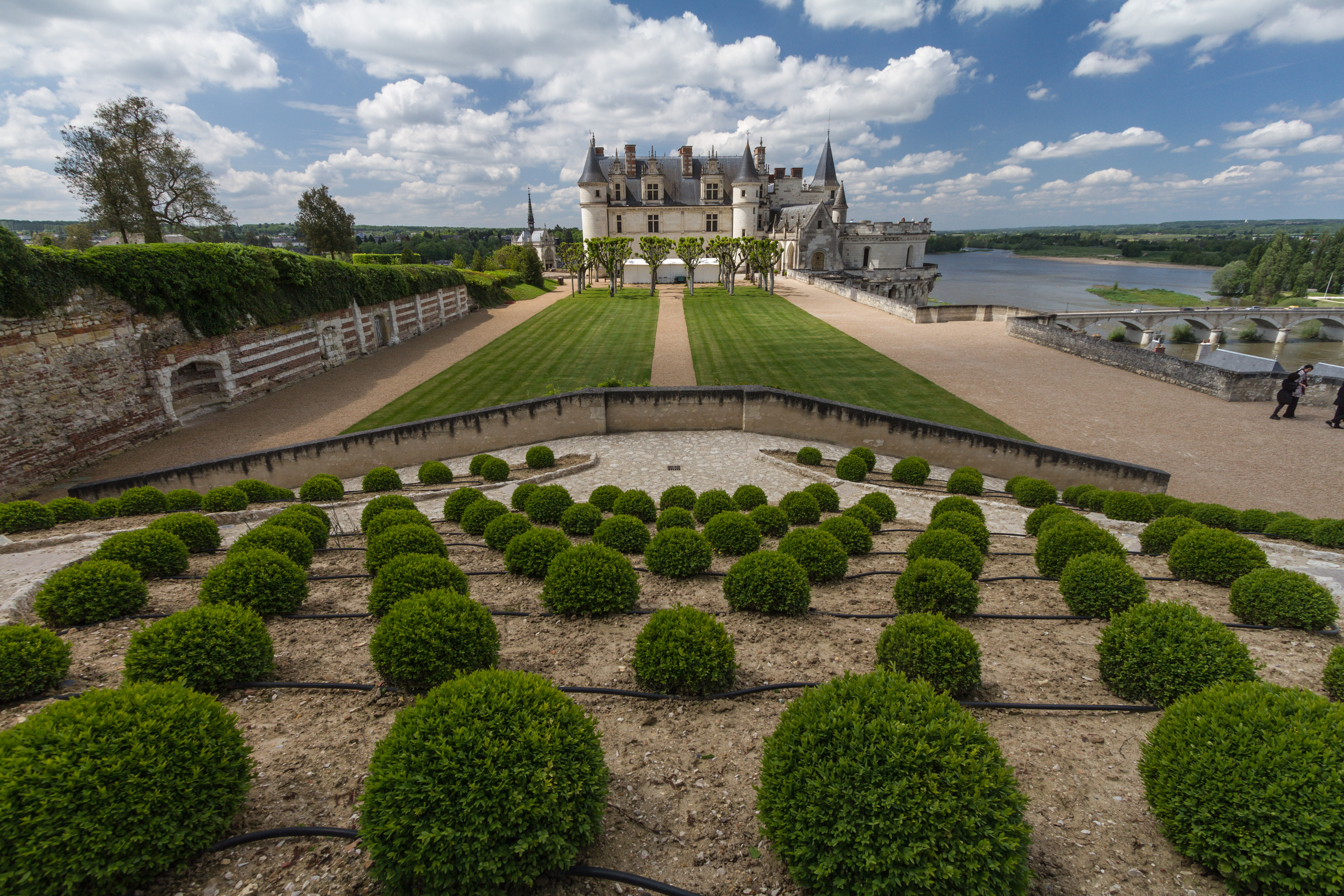
Gardens of the Château

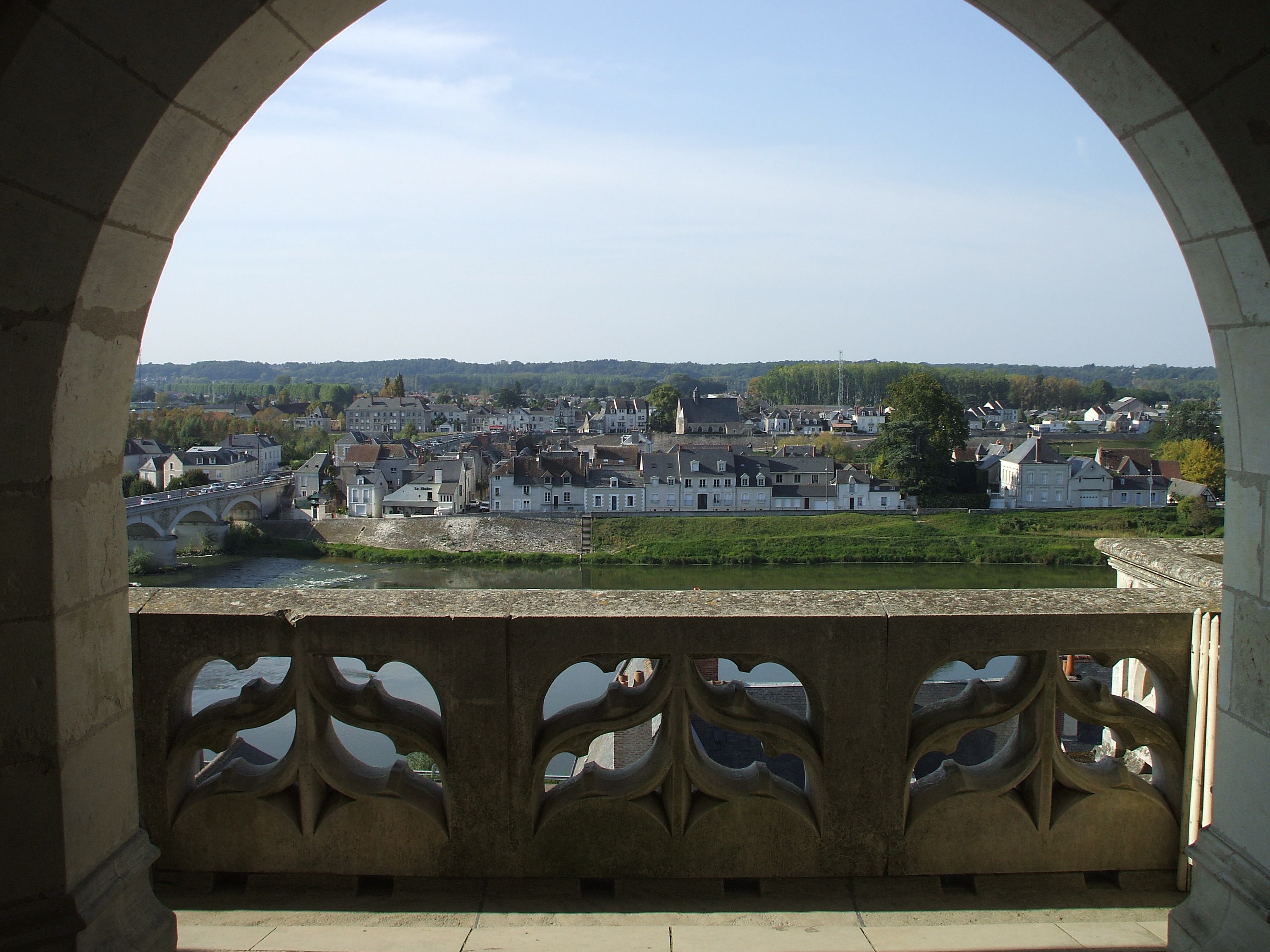
View across the Loire from the Château

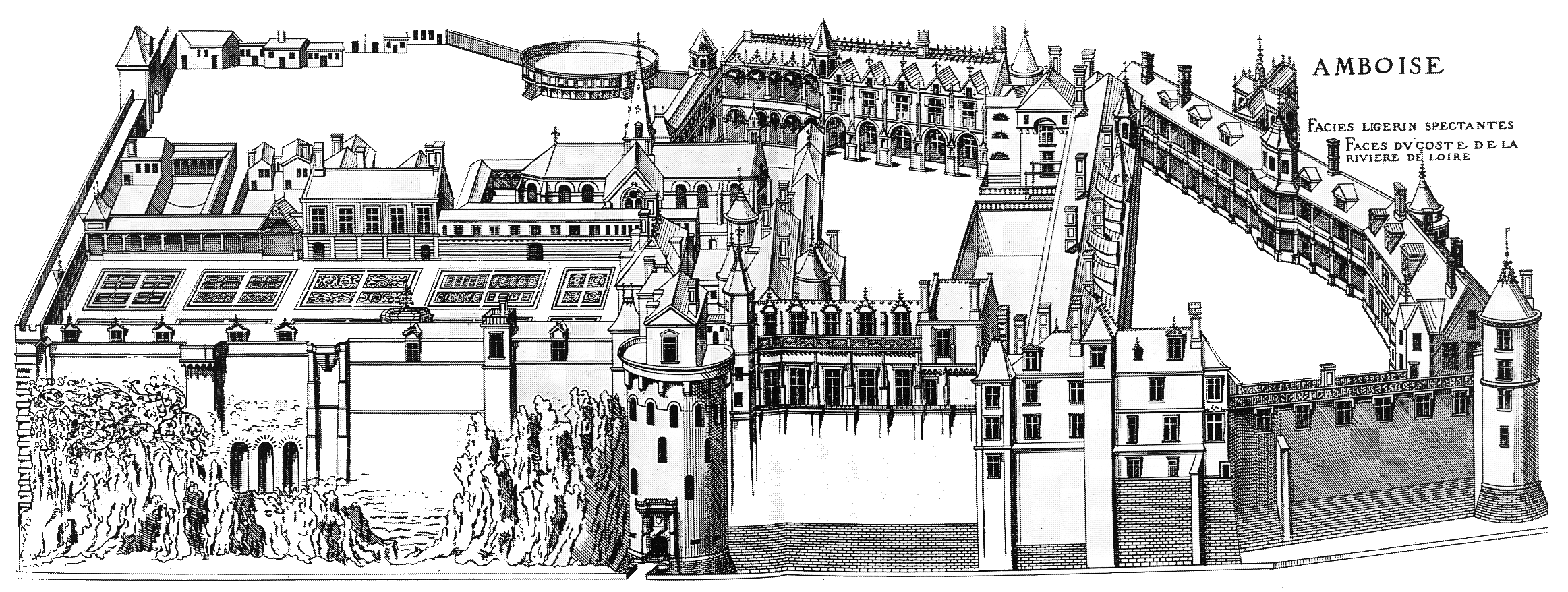
Plan of Château d'Amboise by Jacques I Androuet du Cerceau

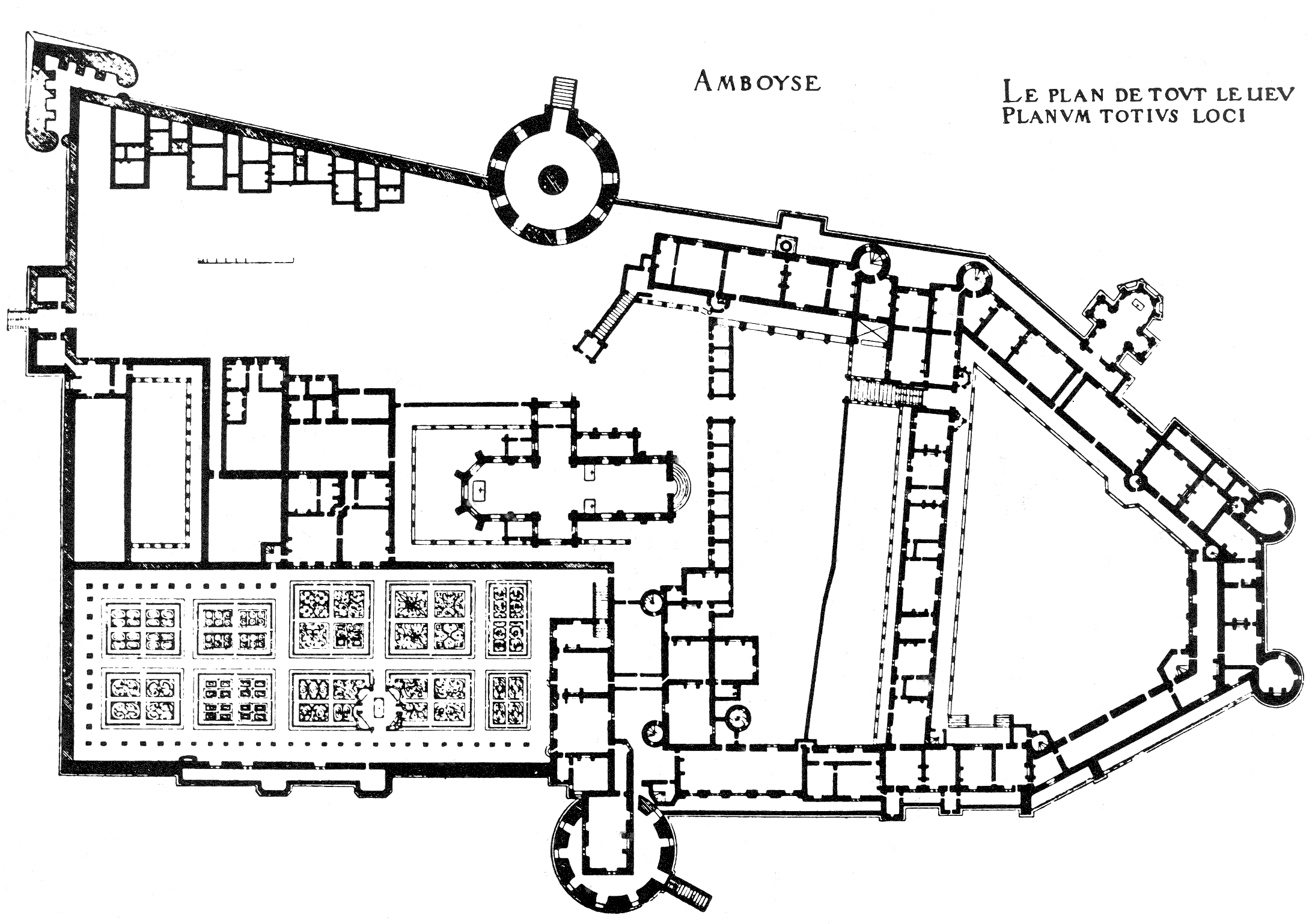
Floor plan of the Château d'Amboise

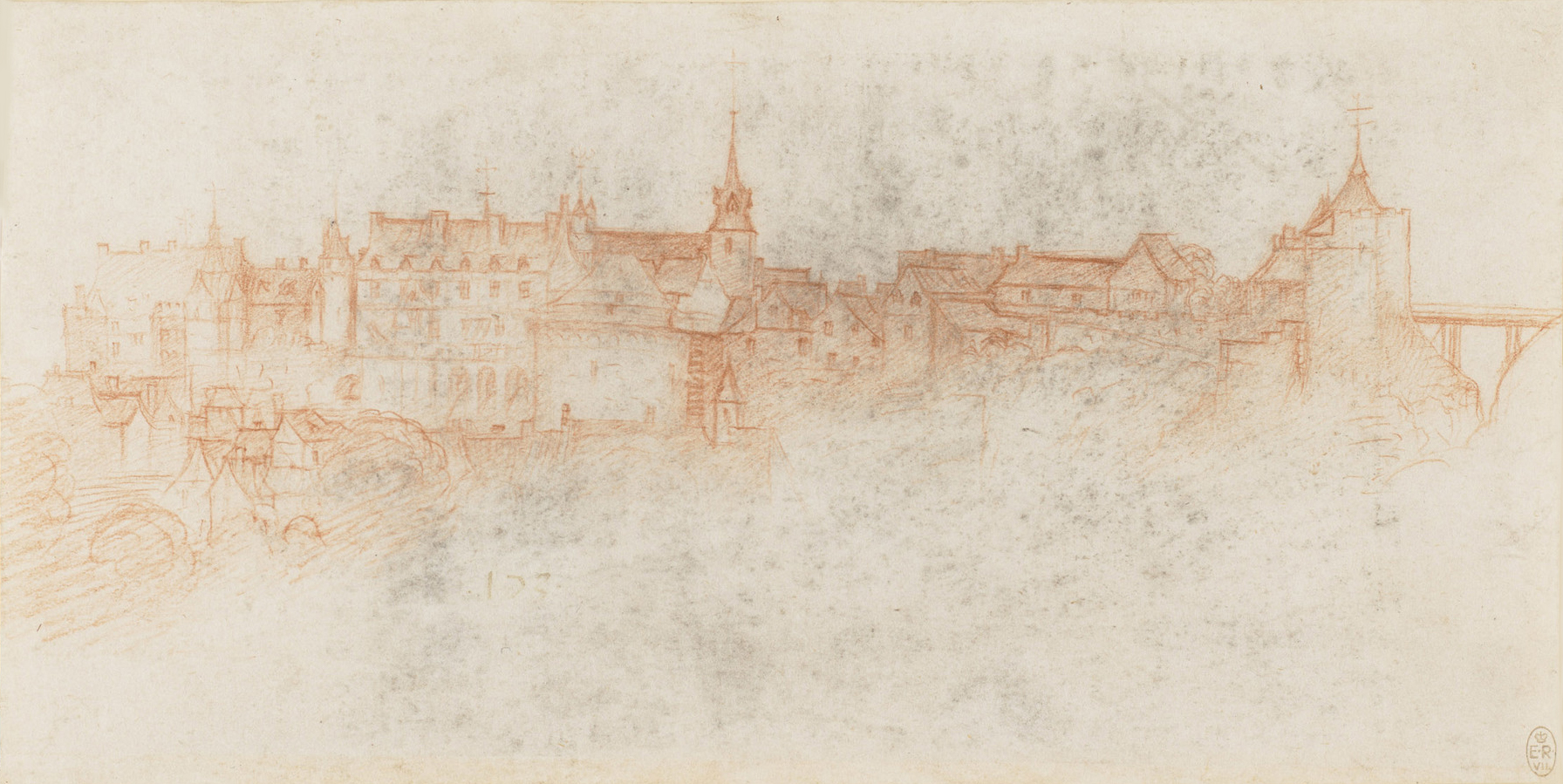
Drawing of the Château d'Amboise (c. 1518) attributed to Francesco Melzi, a friend who was with Leonardo da Vinci at the end of his life

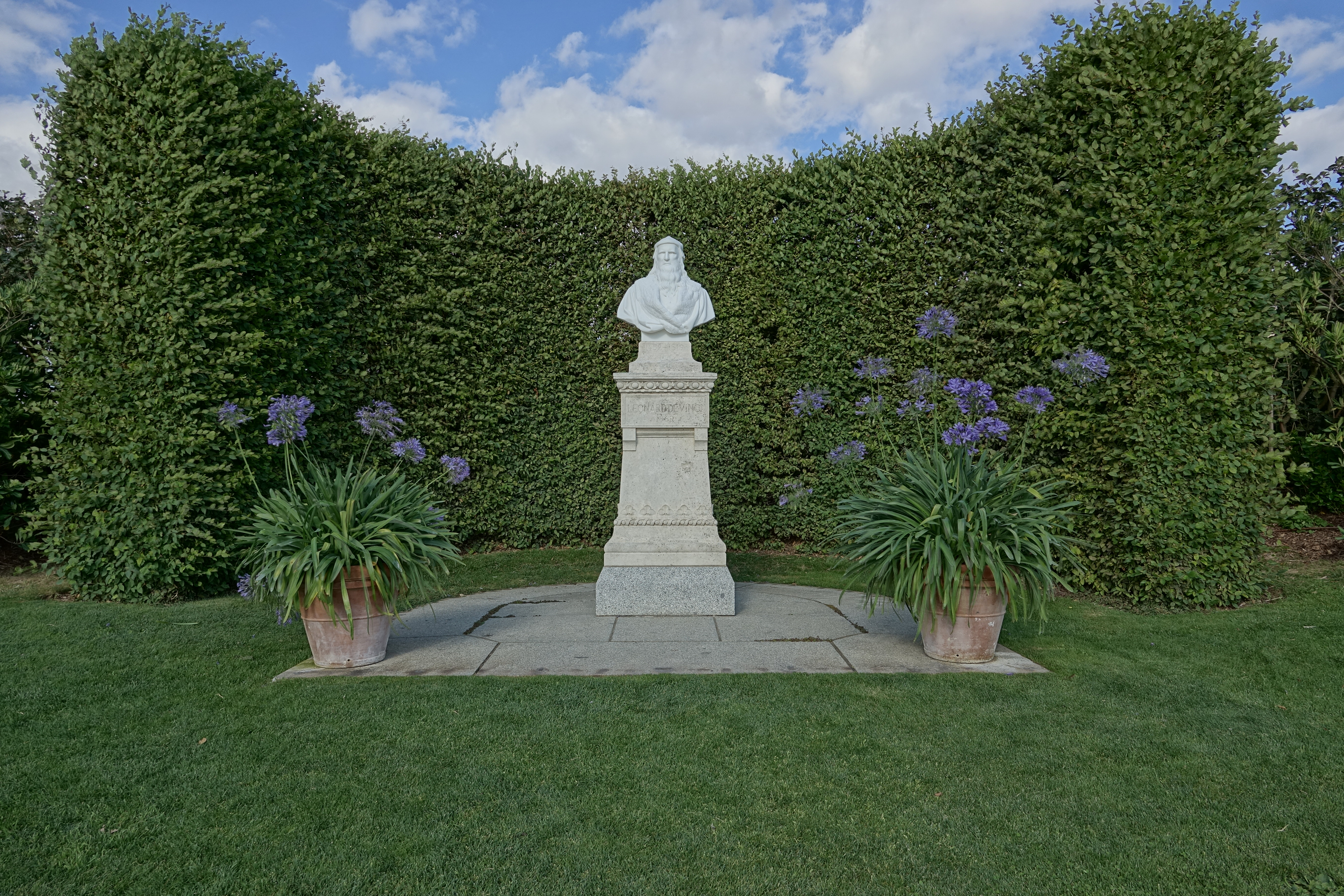
Monument of Leonardo da Vinci

== See also ==
- Gardens of the French Renaissance
- List of castles in France
- Châteliers oppidum

== Notes ==
Bibliography

- Anon (1852), "The Arabs at Amboise", Bentley's Miscellany, Richard Bentley: 258–262
- Benevolo, Leonardo (1978) [1968], Landry, Judith (ed.), The Architecture of the Renaissance, Volume 1, ISBN 0-415-26709-9
- Bachrach, Bernard S. (1993), Fulk Nerra, the neo-Roman consul, 987–1040: a political biography of the Angevin count, University of California Press, ISBN 978-0-520-07996-0
- Garrett, Martin (2010), The Loire: A Cultural History, Oxford University Press, ISBN 978-0-19-976839-4
