= House of Ingelger =

Lineage of Frankish nobility

The House of Ingelger (French: Ingelgériens), also known as The Ingelgerians, was a lineage of the Frankish nobility, and the first dynasty in Anjou, where they established the autonomy and power of the county of Anjou between 930 and 1060. It was founded by Ingelger (died 886), Viscount of Angers, whose son Fulk the Red made himself count of Anjou. By inheritance, the family came into the possession of the county of Vendôme.

The family died out in the male line in 1060 with Geoffrey II of Anjou. He was succeeded in Anjou by his sororal nephew, Geoffrey the Bearded, son of the Count of Gâtinais.

The House of Plantagenet is its Cadet Branch.

== Counts ==
=== Agnatic descent ===
- Ingelger (870–898), father of
- Fulk I the Red (898–941), father of
- Fulk II the Good (941–960), father of
- Geoffrey I Greymantle (960–987), father of
- Fulk III the Black (987–1040), father of
- Geoffrey II Martel (1041–1060), maternal uncle of

=== Cognatic descent ===
- Geoffrey III the Bearded (1060–1067), brother of
- Fulk IV the Ill-Tempered (1067–1109, jointly with his son Geoffrey IV) (1098–1106), father of
- Fulk V the Young (1106–1129), later king of Jerusalem as Fulk I, father of
  - Baldwin III of Jerusalem, founder of the Angevin kings of Jerusalem, brother of
- Geoffrey V Plantagenet (1129–1151), father of

=== Angevin kings of England ===
- Henry Curtmantle (1151–1189), also king of England as Henry II, father of
- Richard Lionheart (1189–1199), also king of England
- Contested between Richard's nephew—Arthur (1199–1203)— and brother— John, King of England (1199–1216)

=== Capetian House of Anjou ===
- Henry II was also father of:
  - Eleanor of England, Queen of Castile, mother of
  - Blanche of Castile, mother of
- Charles I of Anjou, father of
- Charles II of Anjou, father of
- Margaret, Countess of Anjou, wife of Charles of Valois and mother of
- Philip VI of France, father of
- John II of France, father of

=== House of Valois-Anjou ===
- Louis I of Anjou, father of
- Louis II of Anjou, father of two following dukes of Anjou and Charles, Count of Maine
- Louis III of Anjou, brother of
- René of Anjou, brother of
  - Charles, Count of Maine, father of
- Charles IV of Anjou

== Family tree ==
Torquatus foreigner in Anjou
Tertulle († 870), Count of Anjou m Pétronille († 845), Countess of Anjou	Geoffroi I count of Gâtinais	possibly Adèle of Ambois	Rainon († after 900); Bishop of Angers	Adalard († 890); Bishop of Tours
Ingelger († 888) vicomte d'Angers	Adelais of Amboise († c.890)
Fulk le Roux († 942) count of Anjou	Roscille de Loches († c.929)
Ingelger († 927)	Fulk II le Bon († 960) count of Anjou	Gerberge († c.952)	Gui († 973); Bishop of Soissons
Guy († 994); Bishop of le Puy	Adelaide-Blanche of Anjou († 1026) queen of Aquitaine married 5 times	Adèle m Walter I count of the Vexin
Adele of Meaux († c.982)	Geoffrey Greymantle († 987) count of Anjou	Adelaise de Châlons († c.984)
Geoffrey alive c.974	Ermengarde-Gerberga of Anjou († c.1022) m Conan I of Rennes duke of Brittany	Gerberge († c.1041)	Maurice († 1012) count of Châlons
Élisabeth de Vendôme († 999)	Fulk III the Black († 1040) count of Anjou	Hildegarde († 1046)	Hugues du Perche († c.1046) m Beatrice de Macon
Adele († 1034)	Geoffrey II Martel († 1060) count of Anjou	Ermengarde of Anjou († 1076); Duchess of Burgundy	Geoffrey II, Count of Gâtinais († c.1045)
Hildegarde m Josselin I Lord of Courtenay	Geoffrey III († 1096) count of Anjou and Gâtinais	Hildegarde de Beaugency	Ermengarde de Bourbon	Fulk IV le Réchin († 1109) count of Anjou	Bertrade de Montfort († 1117)
Ermengarde of Anjou († 1146) m William IX, Duke of Aquitaine m Alan IV, Duke of Brittany	Geoffrey IV Martel count of Anjou († 1106)	Ermengarde of Maine († 1126) countess of Maine	Fulk V († 1144) count of Anjou king of Jerusalem	Melisende of Jerusalem († 1161)
Geoffrey V Plantagenêt († 1151) m Matilda of England	Elias II, Count of Maine (†1151)	Mathilde († 1119) m William Adelin	Sibylle († 1119) m William Clito m Thierry of Alsace	Baldwin III of Jerusalem († 1163) king of Jerusalem	Amalric of Jerusalem († 1174) king of Jerusalem
Henry II of England († 1189) king of England	Geoffrey VI († 1158) count of Anjou	William FitzEmpress († 1164)	Sibylle († 1191) queen of Jerusalem m Guy de Lusignan	Baudouin IV le Lépreux († 1185) king of Jerusalem	Isabelle († 1206) queen of Jerusalem; 4 marriages
House of Plantagenet	other descendants
