= Fulk of Anjou =

Fulk of Anjou may refer to:

- Fulk I of Anjou
- Fulk II of Anjou
- Fulk III of Anjou
- Fulk IV of Anjou
- Fulk, King of Jerusalem, who was also Fulk V, Count of Anjou
