= Hôtel-Dieu de Bourges =

Former hospital, 16th century, Bourges, France

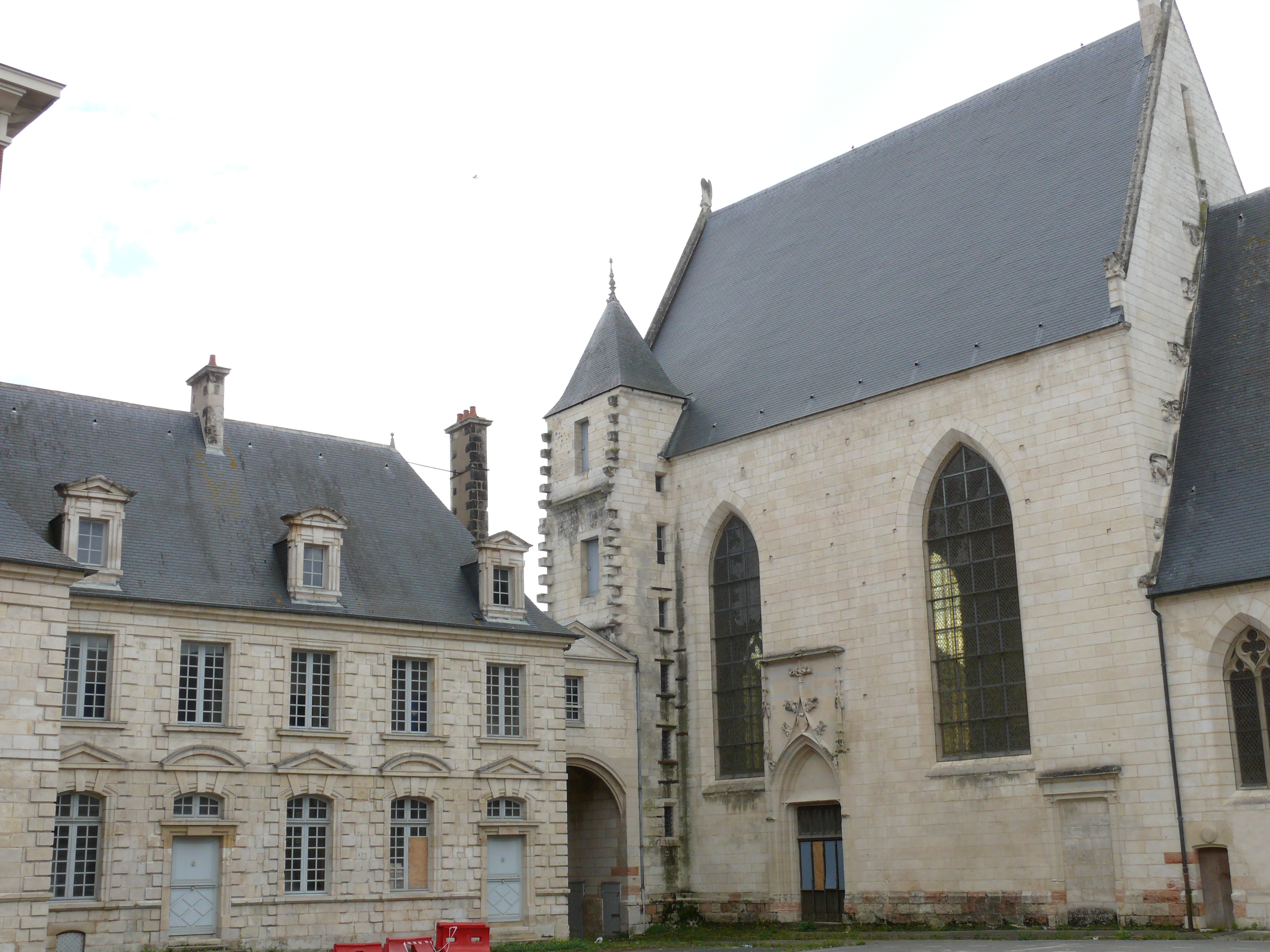
- Chapel of the Hôtel-Dieu, Bourges

Geography
- Location: 28 Rue Gambon, Bourges, Berry, France
- Coordinates: 47°05′12″N 2°23′25″E

Organisation
- Religious affiliation: Catholic Church

History
- Constructed: 1510-1527
- Opened: 16th century
- Closed: 1995

The Hôtel-Dieu de Bourges is a former hospital facility in Bourges, France. Its construction (1510) postdates the Hospices de Beaune by less than seventy years (1443). It exemplifies the same concept of medieval hospital design.

At its inception, the edifice was a crucial asset for Bourges, which then had a population of 15,000. Furthermore, the city had just recently suffered from a Great Fire (French: Grand incendie de la Madeleine) in 1487, which destroyed a third of the buildings (specifically in the northwest district). The Hôtel-Dieu was built in the middle of the devastated area.

After four centuries of operations, it was replaced in 1995 by a brand new hospital located at the eastern end of the city. The ancient buildings, acquired by the municipality, are being restored to host cultural gatherings, especially in the context of Bourges-2028 European capital of culture.

Part of the 20th-century buildings have been since repurposed, notably for student housing.

The 16th and 17th century ensemble has been registered on the National Heritage list (French: Monument historique) on 14 June 1946.

== Location ==
Location of the Hotel-Dieu de Bourges on a 1703 map

The Hôtel-Dieu is located in downtown Bourges, France. It stands near the underground Yvrette stream, constituting one of the many branches of the Yèvre river that flows downstream from the Bourges marshes.

Although situated outside the Gallo-Roman culture defensive walls, this hospital was built within the walls of Philip II of France, near the Saint-Sulpice gate (today Place Rabelais) along Rue Royale (now rue Gambon) which connected the nearby outside-the-walls Saint-Sulpice Abbey to the commercial district of rue Mirebeau and Place Gordaine.

Today, the site is delimited by the following streets: rue Gambon (southern facade), rue du Pont-Merlan (to the east), rue des Poulies (to the north) and a city parking lot to the west.

== History ==
=== Origins ===
Early in the medieval period, Bourges city had developed hospital institutions:

- the oldest one (from 580) was located on rue Bourbonnoux or Vicus Bourbonensis, near Saint-Étienne Cathedral, known as the Grand Hôtel-Dieu (non extant today). It had been created by Sulpicius the Severe (Archbishop of Bourges from 584 to 591). It was decommissioned in 1484, its premises were then used by the University of Bourges.
- Saint-Julien Hospital, established in 1216, was situated north of the city, near the Saint-Bonnet Gate and the Voiselle stream. It used to provide shelter for the poors who did not belong to the town;
- Saint-Lazare Hospital, a leprosarium built beyond the walls, established in 1172. It comprised two buildings: one for the lepers and another for the brothers. In 1521, a chapel was added. The ensemble was razed during the construction of a road.
- Saint-Roch Hospital, a refuge created during the plague outbreaks of 1582 and 1628. It was converted into a general hospital in 1657 and its operations supported by the Sisters of the Most Blessed Sacrament and Charity, established in 1687, in Asnières-lès-Bourges by Michel Phélypeaux de la Vrillière, Archbishop of Bourges (1677-1694).

The construction of the Hôtel-Dieu was triggered after the devastation caused by the Great Fire (French: Grand incendie de la Madeleine) on 22 July 1487. The fire started in the vicinity of the Saint Sulpice abbey, in the nort-west area of Bourges. It destroyed a third of the city.

The new hôtel-dieu project was initiated by the échevins and Guillaume de Cambrai, the Archbishop of Bourges from 1492 to 1505 . The latter vacated plots near the Saint-Étienne Cathedral for the city authorities to construct a new university of law and medicine, while he purchased a swathe of devastated land within the Saint-Médard parish. A decade later, the venture took off, thanks to the initiative of Antoine Bohier Du Prat, Guillaume's successor, and Marguerite de Navarre, sister of Francis I.

=== Construction works ===
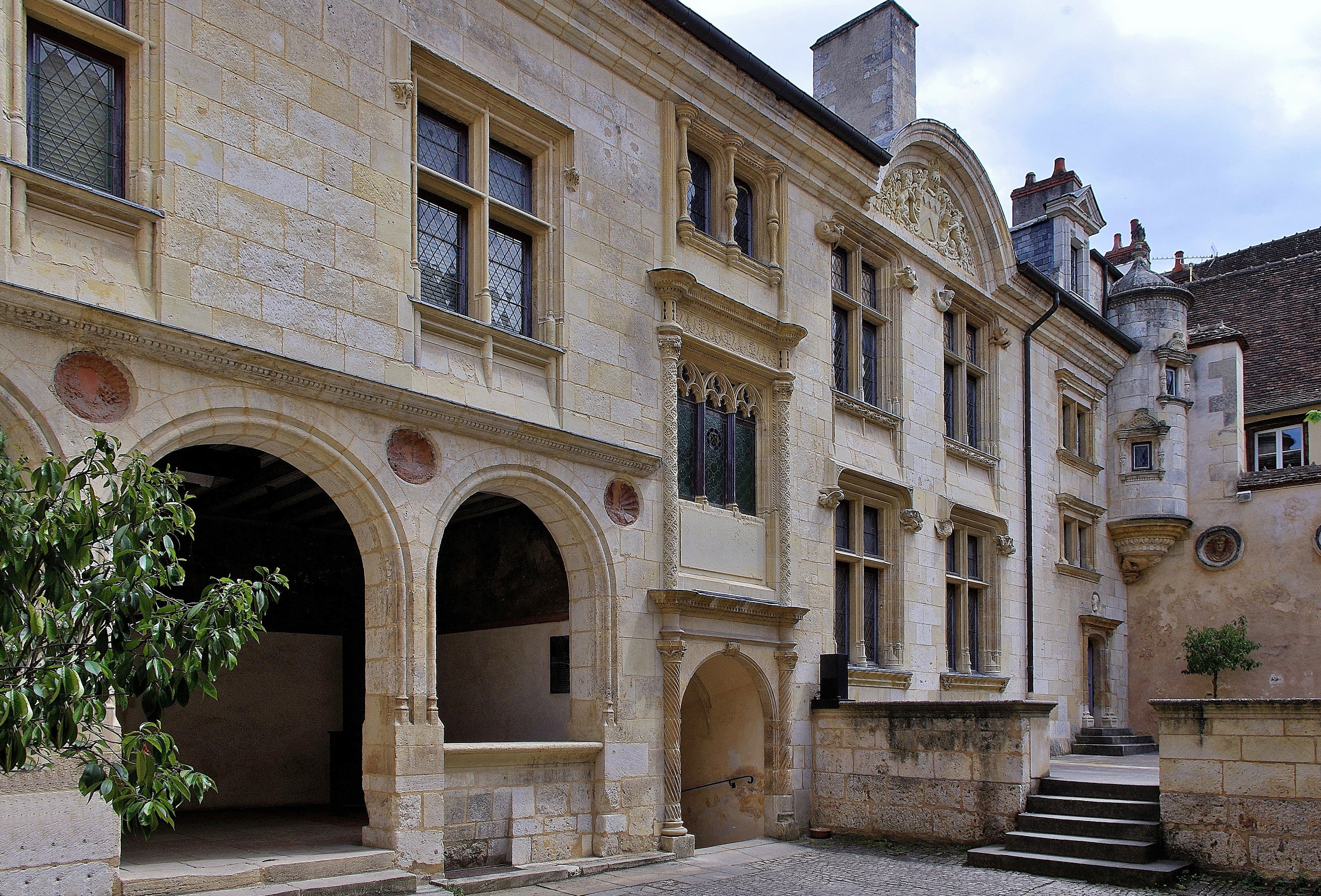
Hôtel Lallemant - Bourges

The initial construction, which lasted from 1510 to 1527, benefited from the presence of numerous artisans and artists in the region who were already working on public building repairs. Although the main architect remains unknown, the names of the craftsmen and the origins of the materials are well documented thanks to a meticulous analysis of cost estimates and invoices archived by the city aldermen. As such, the following craftsmen have been identified as part of the project:

- master masons Guillaume Pelvoysin and his depuuty Colin Biart who worked as well on the Hôtel Lallemant and Hôtel Cujas in Bourges;
- master glassmaker Jean Lecuyer, also known for the Church of Saint-Bonnet in Bourges;
- sculptor Marsault Paule, who designed the motifs on the main doorway. He additionally worked on the western facade portals of the Bourges Cathedral.

The construction was funded by donations; it was managed by city aldermen, with the assistance of nuns in accordance with the Fourth Council of the Lateran (1215). The Hôtel-Dieu owned significant real estate assets, specifically vineyards, in nearby Saint-Doulchard as evidenced by the Extract from the account register of the Hôtel-Dieu de Bourges (1500–1501) (French: Extrait du registre de comptes de l'Hôtel-Dieu de Bourges de 1500-1501). The first buildings were constructed perpendicular to the street, with their gables facing the thoroughfare: they were operational as soon as 1526.

The proximity of the Yèvrette river allowed kitchen and latrine waters to be discharged. Beyond a few kitchen outbuildings, a large garden was used to grow vegetables. A cemetery called le Cimetière des pauvres (English: Poors' cemetery) was located further north.

The courtyard was enclosed to the east by a final wing in the early 17th century, later rebuilt in the 19th century. New buildings were constructed on the site in 1938 and again in 1967.

== Structure ==
=== Historic Buildings ===
The historic Hôtel-Dieu consists of three wings forming a U-shape:

1. a main building oriented north-south, with its gable facing the street;
2. to the south, along the street, a building featuring a Renaissance-style carriage portal;
3. to the north, a wing nicknamed Lejuge, after the name of its architect.

This ensemble has been listed as Monument historique on 14 June 1946. It is part of the protected historic area of Bourges established in 1965. Taiwanese-French watercolour painter Jean Chen faithfully reconstructed the 16th-century Hôtel-Dieu in his book of paintings issued in 2017.

==== Portal ====
Gothic style portal

The monumental Gothic portal was the first element to be built. It gave onto Rue Royale (formerly Rue Saint-Sulpice, now Rue Gambon). It displays the Instruments of the Passion of Jesus, designed by Marsault Paule. The hospital gateway features as well a niche with a bell mechanism for depositing abandoned infants.

To the right of the portal stands a Renaissance-style doorway (now walled up), built a few years later (1533) On the lintel is mentioned a latin motto

Deum time, servata mandata, pauperes sustine (English: Fear God, observe His commandments, support the poor)

reminding the main goals of the religious people serving there.

==== Gothic Chapel ====
The chapel features two bays with diagonal rib vaulting and was originally brightened by mullioned windows (now walled up), located on either side of the central vertical buttress. The buttresses, enhancing the building's stability, are internal. The timber framing dates back to 1522, although masonry works had begun earlier. It has rectangular footprint, 10 metres (33 ft) by 20 metres (66 ft) and was separated from the patients' ward by two bays. It is 28 metres (92 ft) high: this tall gable is mentioned by François Rabelais in 1527, while he was studying at the University of Bourges.

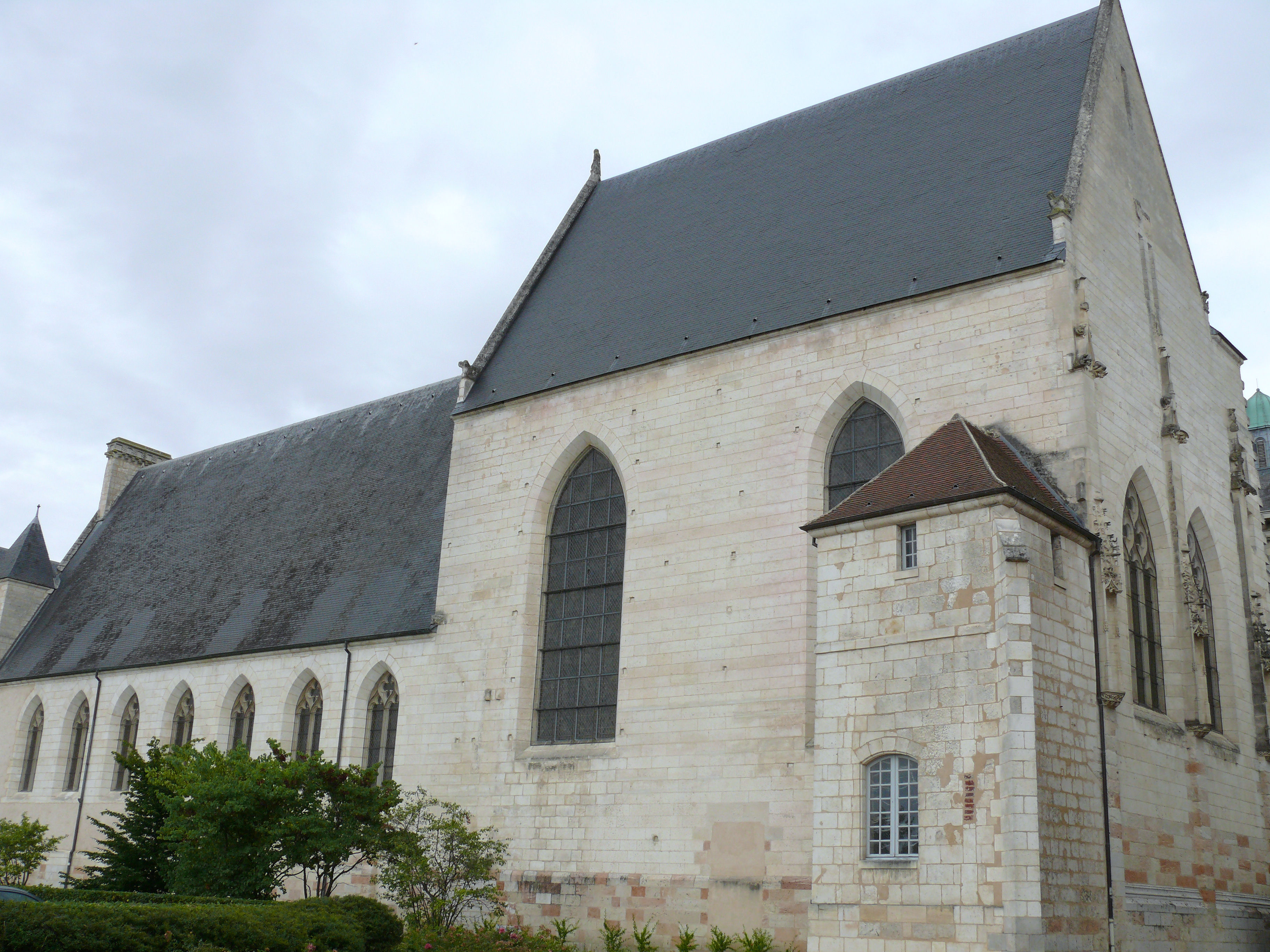
Chapel (right) and patients' ward (left)

==== Patients' ward ====
The low-ceiling patients' ward is lighten up by fourteen lancet windows and closed with a large fireplace, separating it from the pharmacy. The timber framing dates to 1516. The 50,000 slates roof, covering both the chapel and the ward, allowed a late completion of the interior vaulting. It is designed as an extension of the chapel, with a rectangular shape, 10 metres (33 ft) by 30 metres (98 ft), and a lower height. A contemporary description of the ward and the adjacent chapel has been done by Jean Chaumeau, a local historian, in his book Histoire de Berry (English: History of Berry) in 1566.

Fully paved and ventilated by large lancet windows, the hall could accommodate fourteen beds (by comparison, the Hospices de Beaune could accommodate 28 beds at the time). Beyond was located a kitchen, separated from the ward by a monumental fireplace. It had access to a well in the eastern courtyard. Rooms for servants were situated in the attic space above, accessible via a spiral staircase.

==== 17th and 18th centuries additions ====
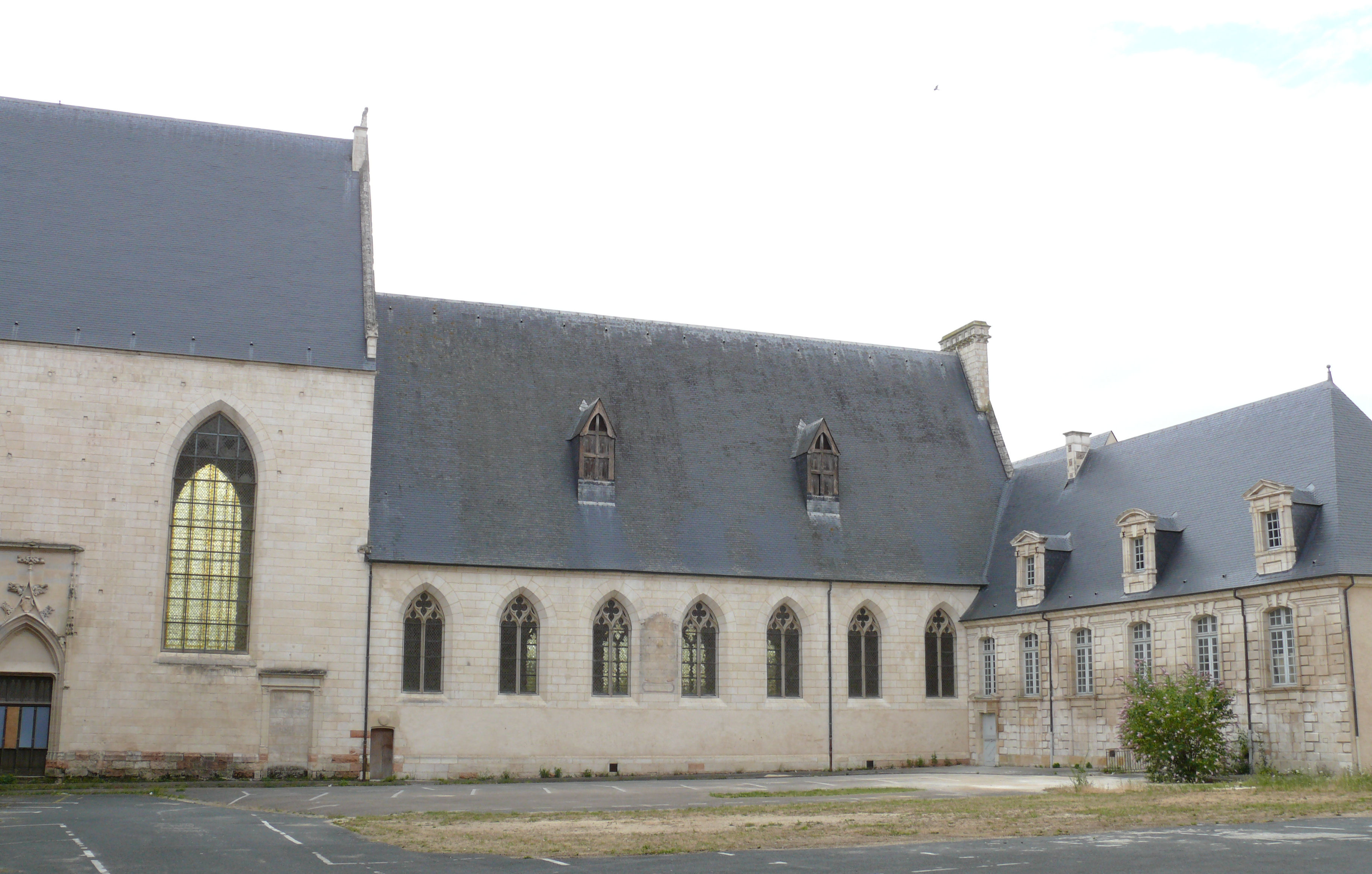
Additional wing (right of the ward building)

A return wing was built between 1628, by the local architect Jean Lejuge: it was dedicated to female patients suffering from fever, following a dramatic plague epidemic in the city. A second return wing was constructed along the street in 1637 by the same architect.

At the end of the 18th century (1794), demands to accommodate up to one hundred patients required the division of the ward into two levels, thus altering the side windows. In 1796, the stained-glass windows (by Jean Lecuyer) of the newly-named Civil and military hospice were dismantled to reclaim the lead. Furthermore, a floor was also added into the chapel space to allow the set up of more beds.

=== Development of the hospital (19th and 20th centuries) ===
From the late 19th century onwards, the site underwent many changes to be transformed into a modern medical institutions:

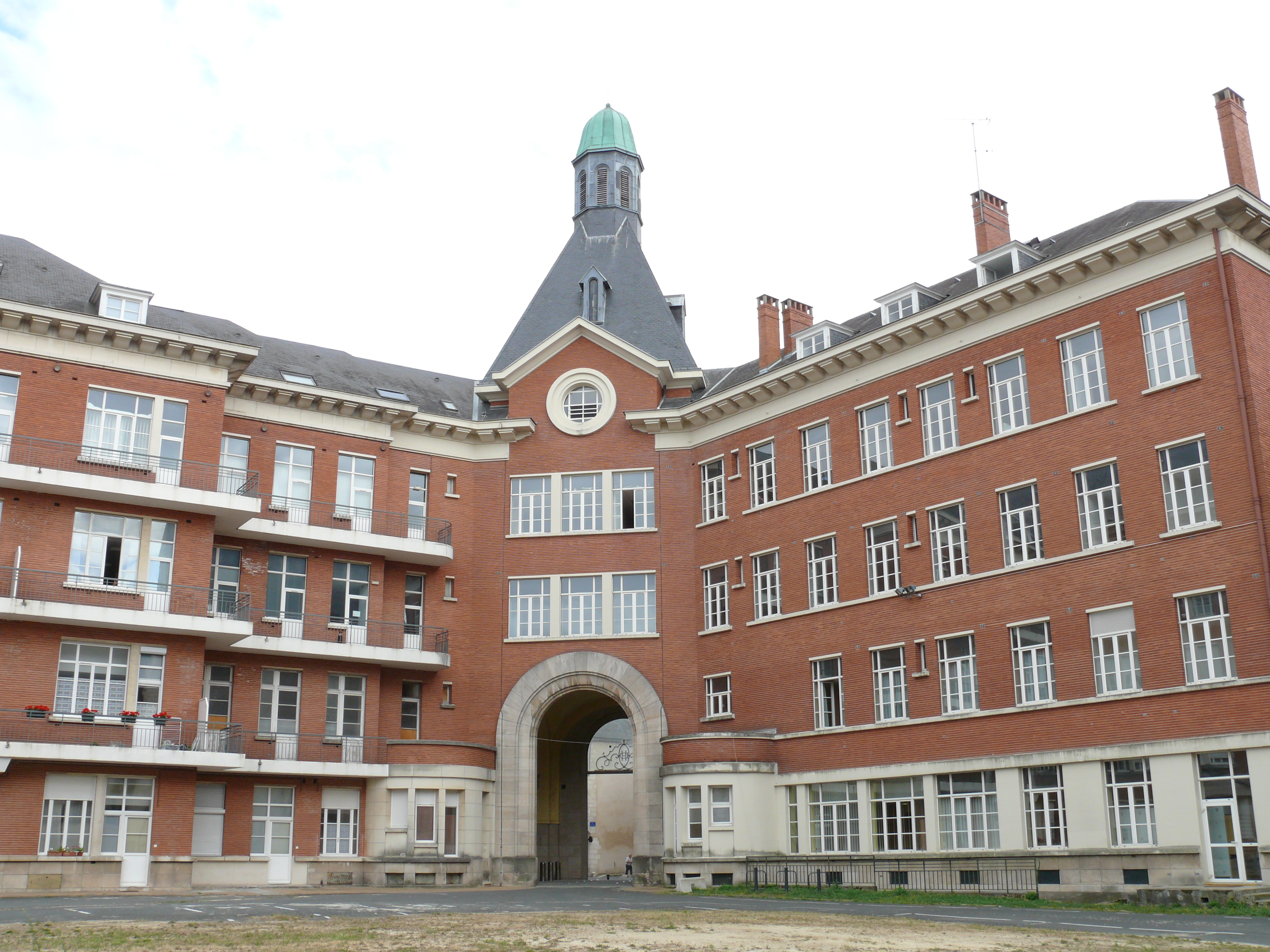
20th century extensions

- set up of the first surgery department room (1874);
- installation of the first incubator (1890);
- opening of the polyclinic, including radiology, ENT and ophthalmology departments (1926);
- creation of a blood transfusion service (1933);
- construction of a new red-brick buildings (1938), completed and put into service after WWII;
- opening of a dedicated maternity building (1967);
- opening of a intensive care unit (1975);
- creation of a Emergency medical service or SAMU (1977);
- installation of a CT scan service (1986).

=== Operations ===
On 21 October 1523, four nuns, following the Rule of Saint Augustine, arrived at the Hôtel-Dieu, three years before the institution start operations.

In 1796, the French Revolution made the Hôtel-Dieu to be renamed Military and civil hospice, and its staff became secular.

In 1802, following the signing of the Concordat, the Hospital Sisters of Mary Immaculate left the institution to join and manage the city General Hospital. They gave way to the arrival of the Sisters of Charity at the Hôtel-Dieu. The last nuns of this community left in 1970.

The construction of a new modern hospital in the east of the city (Jacques Cœur Hospital Centre) was complete in 1995; the last patients of the Hôtel-Dieu left in 1994. The site closed soon after.

Two years later, the city authorities purchased the site and started planning a preservation project.

In 2003, some of the 20th century buildings were converted: the brick edifice at the south-east corner now houses the Maison des Associations (i.e. a centre for local associations), and the north-east block is now a student housing. In 2005, the central section onto rue du Pont Merlan (east facade) was renovated, providing 64 social lodgings.

As part of the project of Bourges-2028 European capital of culture, the ancient buildings will be re-purposed to become a European Centre for Artists and Authors.

== Gallery ==
Gothic-style gateway

Details of a sculpture

Chapel facade onto the street

== See also ==
- Monument historique
- Hôtel-Dieu
- Bourges
- Bourges Cathedral
- Sisters of Charity

== Bibliography ==
- Durand, Rene (1995). L'ancien Hôtel-Dieu de Bourges, XVIe et XVIIe siècles [The former Hôtel-Dieu of Bourges, 16th and 17th centuries] (in French). Bourges: Cercle généalogique du Haut-Berry. ISBN 978-2-905445-15-5.
- Gauchery, Paul; de Grossouvre, A. (1956). Notre vieux Bourges [Our Old Bourges] (in French). Bourges: Desquand et Fils. pp. 169–171.
- Pérouse de Montclos, Jean-Marie (1992). Bourges : Ancien Hôtel-Dieu. Le guide du patrimoine Centre Val de Loire [Bourges: Former Hôtel-Dieu. Centre-Val de Loire Heritage Guide.] (in French). Paris: Hachette. ISBN 978-2-01-018538-0.
- Jean-Marie, Jenn (1983). La construction de l'Hôtel-Dieu de Bourges (1510-1526). Bulletin Monumental, tome 141, n°2 [The Construction of the Hôtel-Dieu in Bourges (1510–1526). Bulletin Monumental, Vol. 141, No. 2] (in French). Bourges: Société française d'Archéologie. pp. 165–188.
