= Adelais of Amboise =

French noble

Adelais of Amboise (sometimes called Aelinde) (fl. 865), came from an influential Frankish family in the Loire Valley. Through her mother, whose name is unknown, she was the niece of Adelard, Archbishop of Tours, and Raino, Bishop of Angers. In 865, her uncles arranged a marriage for her to a Frankish man named Ingelger, described as a miles optimus, whose devotion to Charles the Bald had been rewarded with land and military commands. Adelais’ dowry included Buzençais, Châtillon-sur-Indre, and the fortress of Amboise, which ultimately grew to be the royal residence known as the Château d'Amboise. Adelais and Ingelger, who has been identified as either a viscount or the first count of Anjou, were the parents of Fulk the Red, who became the first hereditary count of Anjou. According to the Gesta consulum Andegavorum, “after the death of her husband, Adelais was unjustly accused of adultery by a group of nobles led by ‘Guntrannus parens Ingelgerii’ but later exonerated.”
