= Chronica de gestis consulum Andegavorum =

A page from the manuscript BnF lat. 6218, containing the earliest and shortest copy of the Gesta. This passage concerns Count Geoffrey the Bearded.

The Chronica de gestis consulum Andegavorum ("Chronicle of the deeds of the consuls of Anjou"), or simply Gesta consulum Andegavorum, is a Latin history of the Ingelgerian dynasty of the county of Anjou written in the early 12th century, probably between 1106 and 1109, during the second reign of Count Fulk IV.

The Chronica survives in five different redactions represented by seven manuscripts. The text was revised and expanded several times in the 12th century, the last time in 1172 by John, a monk of Marmoutier près Tours. The Chronica often appears together in manuscripts with two other Angevin historical works, the Liber de compositione castri Ambaziae and Gesta Ambasiensium dominorum.

The Chronica consists of a series of biographies beginning with the supposed founder of the dynasty, Tertullus, who is not mentioned in any earlier source.

== Editions ==
- "Chronica de gestis consulum Andegavorum", in Louis Halphen and René Poupardin, eds., Chronique des comtes d'Anjou et des seigneurs d'Amboise (Paris: Auguste Picard, 1913), pp. 25–73.
- "Chronica de gestis consulum Andegavorum", in Paul Marchegay and André Salmon, eds., Chroniques d'Anjou, Volume 1 (Cambridge University Press, 2010 [1856]), pp. 34–157. doi:10.1017/CBO9780511731433.002
