= Elias II of Maine =

French noble (brother to Elias I)

Elias II (also Helias, Hélie, Helyes or Élie) (died 15 January 1151) was the younger son of Fulk V of Anjou and his first wife, Eremburga of Maine, daughter of Count Elias I of Maine. There is debate as to whether he was ever count of Maine or whether he merely made a claim to it.

Elias was born no earlier than May 1114. By 1129, Elias had married Philippa, daughter of Count Rotrou III of Perche.

It is possible but unlikely that Elias' father left him the county of Maine; his elder brother, Geoffrey Plantagenet was ruler of Anjou, Maine and the Touraine. Elias rebelled in 1145 with the support of Lord Robert III of Sablé, sparking a conflict known in Angevin historiography as the "war of the barons" (guerra baronum). This war may have dragged on into 1146, but in the end Elias was captured and imprisoned by his brother. According to the Gesta consulum Andegavorum, Elias, acting "by the counsel of wicked men ... attacked his own brother, demanding the consulship of Maine". A 13th-century source, the Chronicon Turonense magnum, likewise call Elias the count of Maine. All chronicles agree that Elias was imprisoned in Tours and died as a result. John of Marmoutier, writing in the 1170s, states that Geoffrey released Elias, but that he died from a fever contracted during his incarceration a few days later. The annals of the priory of L'Évière place his death in 1151, and the necrology of the priory of Fontaines gives the date as 15 January.

Elias and Philippa had a daughter, Beatrix, who married John I of Alençon.

== Sources ==
- Barton, Richard Ewing (2004). Lordship in the County of Maine, C. 890-1160. The Boydell Press.
- Thompson, Kathleen (2002). Power and Border Lordship in Medieval France. The Boydell Press.
