= Ingelger =

9th century Frankish nobleman & founder of House of Anjou

- Count of Anjou
- Successor: Fulk I
- Full name: Ingelger or Ingelgarius
- Born: 845
- Died: 888
- Buried: Church of Saint-Martin at Châteauneuf-sur-Sarthe
- Noble family: Ingelger
- Spouse: Adelais of Amboise
- Issue: Fulk the Red

Ingelger (845 – 888), also called Ingelgarius, was a Frankish nobleman, who was the founder of the County of Anjou and of the original House of Anjou. Later generations of his family believed that he was the son of Tertullus (Tertulle) and Petronilla. (Note: The anonymous twelfth-century Gesta Consulum Andegavorum names his father as Tertullus nobilem dux, but both the name Tertullus and the title dux are unusual. Another twelfth-century source, the Chronicon Turonensis (c. 1180) records that Ingelger was nepos Hugonis ducis Burgundiæ, a nephew of Hugh, Duke of Burgundy (died 952) — chronologically stretched. Modern scholars are divided as to the historicity of Tertullus and Petronilla.)

Around 877, he inherited his father Tertullus' lands in accordance with the Capitulary of Quierzy, which Charles the Bald had issued. His father's holdings from the King included Château-Landon in beneficium, and he was a casatus in the Gâtinais and Francia. Contemporary records refer to Ingelger as a miles optimus, an excellent soldier.

Later, in accordance with family tradition, his mother was made a relative of Hugh the Abbot, (Note: This man is distinct from abbot Hugh, son of Charlemagne, but the two are frequently confused, resulting in some 19th-century sources erroneously naming Petronilla as granddaughter of Charlemagne.) an influential counselor of both Louis II and Louis III of France, from whom he received preferment. By Louis II Ingelger was appointed viscount of Orléans, which city was under the rule of its bishops at the time. At Orléans Ingelger made a matrimonial alliance with one of the leading families of Neustria, the lords of Amboise.

He married Adelais, whose maternal uncles were Adalard, Archbishop of Tours, and Raino, Bishop of Angers. Later Ingelger was appointed prefect (military commander) at Tours, then ruled by Adalard.

At some point, Ingelger was appointed Count of Anjou, at a time when the county stretched only as far west as the river Mayenne. Later sources credit his appointment to his defense of the region from Vikings, but modern scholars have been more likely to see it as a result of his wife's influential relatives.

Ingelger was buried in the Church of Saint-Martin at Châteauneuf, Allègre, France. He was succeeded by his son Fulk the Red.
