= Liber de compositione castri Ambaziae et ipsius dominorum gesta =

12th-century Latin chronicle of the lords and castle of Amboise

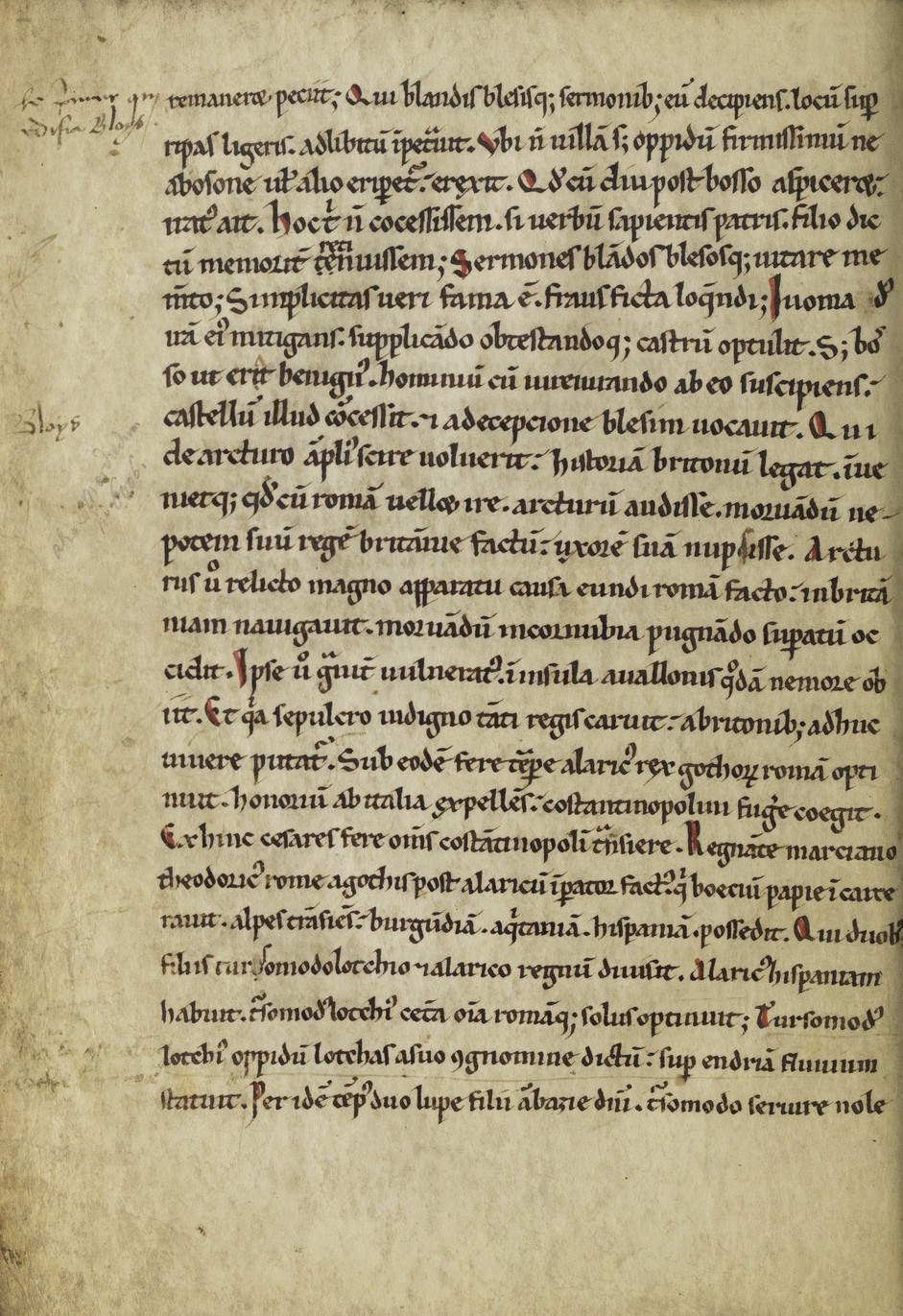
A page from a 13th-century copy of the Liber de compositione

The Liber de compositione castri Ambaziae et ipsius dominorum gesta (Book about the Construction of the Castle of Amboise and the Deeds of Its Lords) is an anonymous 12th-century Latin chronicle of the early history of the lords and castle of Amboise. It begins with an account of Touraine and its historical narrative proceeds from Julius Caesar (died 44 BC) down to Louis VII (AD 1137–1180).

== Editions ==
- "Liber de compositione castri Ambaziae et ipsius dominorum gesta", in Louis Halphen and René Poupardin, eds., Chronique des comtes d'Anjou et des seigneurs d'Amboise (Paris: Auguste Picard, 1913), pp. 1–24.
- "Liber de compositione castri Ambaziæ", in Paul Marchegay and André Salmon, eds., Chroniques d'Anjou, Volume 1 (Cambridge University Press, 2010 [1856]), pp. 3–33. doi:10.1017/CBO9780511731433.001
