= Albert Lecoy de La Marche =

French archivist and historian (1839–1897)

Albert Lecoy de La Marche (21 November 1839, Nemours – 22 February 1897, Paris) was a French archivist and historian.

== Biography ==
After graduating from the École des Chartes in 1861, he was appointed archivist of the Department of Haute Savoie. In 1864, he went to Paris as archivist in the historical section of the Archives de l'Empire. For many years, he was also a professor of French history at the Catholic Institute in Paris.

== Works ==
His magnum opus is Chaire française au moyen âge (Paris, 1868), which was awarded a prize by the Académie des Inscriptions et Belles-Lettres. It consists of three parts:

- Part I ("Les prédicateurs") begins with a summary of the history of preaching in the early church, and in France prior to the eleventh century, and then gives an exhaustive history of French preachers in the following centuries, especially the thirteenth.
- Part II ("Les sermons") deals with the audiences, the time and the place of preaching, and the various kinds of sermons.
- Part III ("La société d'après les sermons") is a study of all social classes of French society in the Middle Ages as it appears in the light of the sermons.

His other publications include:

- Le roi René, sa vie, son administration (1873)
- L'Académie de France à Rome (1874)
- Anecdotes historiques, légendes et apologues, tirés du recueil inédit d'Étienne de Bourbon dominicain du 13e siècle (1877)
- La Société au XIIIe siècle (1880)
- Saint Martin (1881)
- Les manuscrits et la miniature (1884)
- Relations politiques de la France et du royaume de Majorque (1892)
