= Colin Biart =

French master mason, master builder and architect

Colin Biart, also called Colin Biard, Nicolas Biart or Colin Byart or Nicolas Byart, was a French master mason, master builder, and architect, born in Amboise in 1460, active until 1515.

== Biography ==
Biart married at Beaugency in 1479. He started working in Amboise where he participated in the realization of the sets for the entrance of Margaret of Austria.

He also worked at the Château d'Amboise (1495–1496) with Guillaume Senault. He worked there again in 1508, and again in 1515.

After the collapse of the Pont Notre-Dame in Paris in 1499, he was called as a master mason and participated in the commission that chose to rebuild the bridge with stones in 1500.

Pierre de Rohan-Gié, Marshal of France, asked him to intervene at the Château du Verger while working on the Louis XII wing of Château de Blois, before 1510. It is possible that he was involved in the construction of the Longueville wing of Château de Châteaudun.

Georges d'Amboise, the archbishop of Rouen, brought him from Blois to build the Château de Gaillon from 1504, with his assistant, Guillaume Senault. At his request, he intervened on the Beurre (butter) tower of the Rouen Cathedral in 1506.

On the recommendation of the Archbishop of Rouen, he was summoned along with other master masons by the chapter of the Bourges Cathedral following the collapse of the north tower in 1508. In an investigation, he says that

depuis son plus jeune aige, il a toujours esté meslé et entremis du faict de massonnerie, et entr'aultres a esté à conduire le commencement des ponts Notre-Dame de Paris. Depuys fust appellé par le seigneur de Guyez, mareschal de France, à veoir faire et visiter quelque œuvre du chasteau du Verpré et au chasteau d'Amboyse, et depuys au chasteau de Blois, qui sont choses somptueuses et de grant entreprise, et a toujours hanté et fréquenté plusieurs maitres expérimentés audict mestier.

In this period of change of taste in French architecture where the synthesis of the refinement of the gothic flamboyant with the appearance of the first Italianizing elements of the First Renaissance, he showed his ability to master the construction of various works.
