= René Poupardin =

French medievalist and paleographer

René Poupardin (27 February 1874 – 23 August 1927) was a French medievalist and paleographer whose most important works were on Burgundy, Provence and the south Italian principalities. He was an alumnus of the École nationale des chartes and a member of the École française de Rome from 1899 to 1902. He was studies director at the École pratique des hautes études and later a professor at the École des chartes. He also worked as a librarian at the Bibliothèque nationale de France. Born at Le Havre and died at Fontainebleau, most of his life was spent in Paris and Rome.

== Bibliography ==
Monographs

- Boson et le royaume de Provence (855–933). Chalon-sur-Saône: E. Bertrand, 1899.
- Le Royaume de Provence sous les Carolingiens, 855–933. Paris: Émile Bouillon, 1901. Online here
- Le Royaume de Bourgogne, 888–1038: étude sur les origines du royaume d'Arles. Paris: Champion, 1907. Online here
- Études sur l'histoire des principautés lombardes de l'Italie méridionale et de leurs rapports avec l'Empire franc. Paris: Champion, 1907. Online here

Critical editions

- La Vie de Saint Didier: évêque de Cahors, 630–655. Paris: A. Picard, 1900. Online here
- Monuments de l'histoire des abbayes de Saint-Philibert (Noirmoutier, Grandlieu, Tournus). Paris: A. Picard, 1905.
- (with Louis Barrau-Dihigo) Cartulaire de Saint-Vincent-de-Lucq. Pau: J. Empérauger, 1905.
- Recueil des chartes de l'abbaye de Saint-Germain-des-Prés: Des origines au début du XIIIe siècle, 2 vols. Paris: Champion, 1909–32.
- (with Louis Halphen) Chroniques des comtes d'Anjou et des seigneurs d'Amboise. Paris: A. Picard, 1913.
- Recueil des actes des rois de Provence: 855–928. Paris: Imprimerie nationale, 1920.

Bibliographies

- Catalogue des manuscrits des collections Duchesne et Bréquigny. Paris: Éditions Ernest Leroux, 1905. Online here
- (with Lucien Auvray) Catalogue des manuscrits de la Collection Baluze. Paris: Éditions Ernest Leroux, 1921. Online here

== Sources ==
- Prou, Maurice (1927). "René Poupardin". Bibliothèque de l'École des chartes. 88: 377–80.
