= Fulk I of Anjou =

10th-century Frankish nobleman

- Count of Anjou
- Tenure: 929 – 942
- Born: c. 870
- Died: 942 (aged 72); Tours
- Noble family: Ingelger
- Spouse: Roscille de Loches
- Issue: Fulk II
- Father: Ingelger
- Mother: Adelais of Amboise

Fulk I of Anjou (c. 870 – 942), known by the nickname Foulques le Roux ("Fulk the Red", i.e. "Red Falcon"), was a Frankish nobleman who held several titles in West Francia, including Viscount and later Count of Tours from 905, Count of Nantes from 910 to 919, and the first Count of Anjou from 929 until his death.

== Life ==
Born about 870, Fulk was the son of Ingelger of Anjou and Adelais of Amboise. He was the first Count of Anjou, ruling the county from about 908 to 942. In 899 he became Viscount of Tours and in 905 Count of Tours. In about 910 he was Count of Nantes. He increased his territory as a viscountcy of Angers and, around 929, he claimed the title Count of Anjou. During his lordship, he was frequently at war with the Normans and the Bretons. He occupied the county of Nantes in 907, but abandoned it to the Bretons in 919. Fulk I died around 942.

== Family ==
Fulk married Roscille de Loches, daughter of Warnerius (Widone), Seigneur de Loches, de Villentrois, and de la Haye, and his wife Tecandra. He and Roscille had:

- Guy (Wido), Bishop of Soissons († 970).
- Fulk II. Succeeded his father as Count of Anjou.

Fulk I of Anjou Angevins Born: c. 870 Died: 942
Preceded by Ingelger	Count of Anjou; 898–942	Succeeded by Fulk II
