= Robert II of Sablé =

Robert III of Sablé
- Lord of Sablé-sur-Marthe

Lord of Sablé-sur-Marthe
- Predecessor: Lisiard of Sablé
- Successor: Robert IV of Sablé
- Born: 1122 or 1123; Sablé, Kingdom of France
- Died: 1151 or 1152
- Spouse: Hersende of Antenaise
- Issue: Robert IV of Sablé; Marguerite of Sablé
- House: Third House of Sablé
- Father: Lisiard of Sablé
- Mother: Thiphaine Chevrière of Briolé

Robert II de Sablé (Note: Scott Jessee numbers the son of Lisiard of Sable as Robert III de Sablé) (died 1165) was the son of Lisiard of Sable and Thiphaine of Briole.

Robert and his father Lisiard, Lord of Sablé, both fought against the Counts of Anjou, Fulk V and Geoffrey Plantagenet. This conflict lasted until 1145, when he was defeated in battle and would remain a loyal subject of the Counts of Anjou.

== Marriage and family ==
Robert married Hersende of Anthenaise with whom he had:

- Marguerite
- Robert IV of Sablé, Grand Master of the Knights Templar

== Sources ==
- Jessee, Scott (2015). "Crusaders and Templars: Robert the Burgundian Lord of Craon and Sablé and his Descendants, 1095-1192". Medieval Prosopography. 30.
