= Saint-Avit =

Saint-Avit is the name or part of the name of several communes in France:

- Saint-Avit, Charente, in the Charente department
- Saint-Avit, Drôme, in the Drôme department
- Saint-Avit, Landes, in the Landes department
- Saint-Avit, Loir-et-Cher, in the Loir-et-Cher department
- Saint-Avit, Lot-et-Garonne, in the Lot-et-Garonne department
- Saint-Avit, Puy-de-Dôme, in the Puy-de-Dôme department
- Saint-Avit, Tarn, in the Tarn department
- Saint-Avit, Tarn-et-Garonne, former commune of the Tarn-et-Garonne department, now part of Saint-Amans-de-Pellagal
- Saint-Avit-de-Fumadières, former commune of the Dordogne department, now part of Bonneville-et-Saint-Avit-de-Fumadières
- Saint-Avit-de-Soulège, in the Gironde department
- Saint-Avit-de-Tardes, in the Creuse department
- Saint-Avit-de-Tizac, former commune of the Dordogne department, now part of Port-Sainte-Foy-et-Ponchapt
- Saint-Avit-de-Vialard, in the Dordogne department
- Saint-Avit-du-Moiron, former commune of the Gironde department, now part of Saint-Avit-Saint-Nazaire
- Saint-Avit-Frandat, in the Gers department
- Saint-Avit-le-Pauvre, in the Creuse department
- Saint-Avit-les-Guespières, in the Eure-et-Loir department
- Saint-Avit-Rivière, in the Dordogne department
- Saint-Avit-Saint-Nazaire, in the Gironde department
- Saint-Avit-Sénieur, in the Dordogne department
