= Jean du Bellay =

French Catholic cardinal (1492–1560)

His Eminence Jean du Bellay
- Cardinal-Bishop
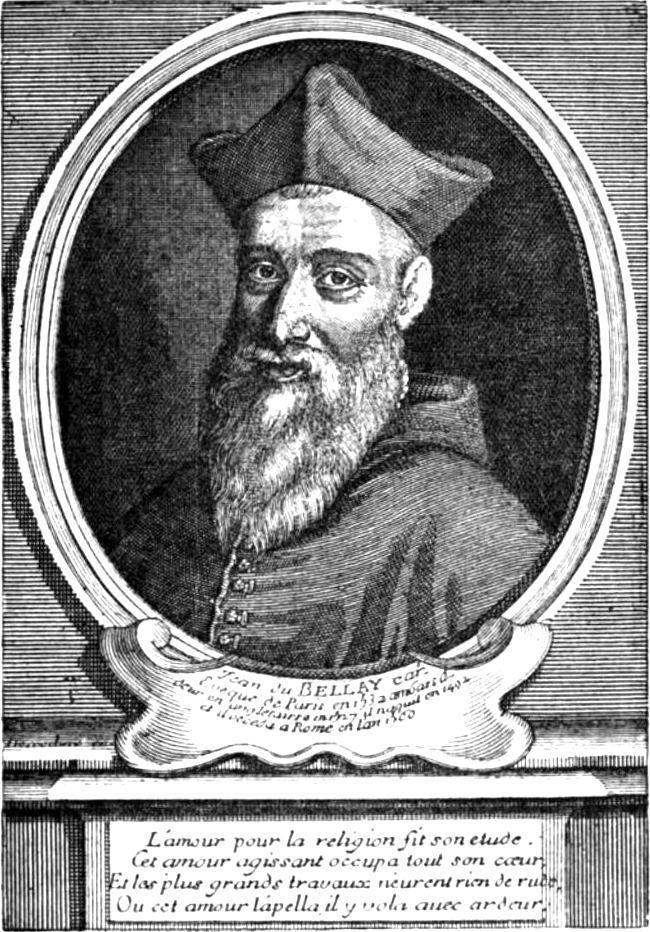
- Church: Santa Cecilia in Trastevere; San Pietro in Vincoli; San Crisogono
- Diocese: Paris (1532–1560)
- See: Albano (1550–1553); Tusculum (1553); Porto (1553–1555); Ostia (1555–1560)

Orders
- Created cardinal: 21 May 1535 by Pope Paul III

Personal details
- Born: 1492 Souday, Anjou, France
- Died: 16 February 1560 (aged 67–68) Rome, Papal States
- Buried: Sma. Trinità dei Monti
- Residence: Paris
- Parents: Louis du Bellay; Marguerite de la Tour-Landry
- Occupation: Diplomat
- Education: Licenciate in Canon and Civil Law
- Alma mater: Sorbonne (?)

Jean du Bellay (1492 – 16 February 1560) was a French diplomat and cardinal, a younger brother of Guillaume du Bellay, and cousin and patron of the poet Joachim du Bellay. He was bishop of Bayonne by 1526, a member of the Conseil privé (privy council) of King Francis I from 1530, and bishop of Paris from 1532. He became Bishop of Ostia and Dean of the College of Cardinals in 1555.

== Biography ==
Du Bellay was born at Souday, second of the six sons of Louis, son of Jean du Bellay, Seigneur de Langey, and Marguerite, daughter of Raoullet, Baron of La Tour-Landry. Four of their sons survived infancy, including Guillaume, Martin, and René. They had two daughters, Renée, who married Ambroise Baron des Cousteaux, and Louise, who married Jacques d'Aunay, Sieur de Villeneuve-la-Guyart. The fief of Bellay was located near Saumur in Anjou.

He is said to have gotten his education in Paris. It is also speculated, however, that he studied at the University of Angers. He had a licenciate in utroque iure (Civil Law and Canon Law). He was a priest of the diocese of Le Mans. He was appointed Bishop of Bayonne by King Francis I, an appointment was approved by Pope Clement VII on 12 February 1524. He held the position until his transfer to the See of Paris in 1532. On 2 March 1533, Pope Clement granted Bishop du Bellay the privilege of holding multiple benefices both in the diocese of Paris and in other dioceses as well. King Francis confirmed this indult on 1 October 1534. Jean du Bellay was succeeded as Bishop of Paris by his nephew Eustache, on 16 March 1551, after Cardinal Jean was dismissed by King Henry II.

=== Diplomat in England ===
He was well-fitted for a diplomatic career, and carried out several missions in England (1527–1534). He was Ambassador Ordinary from November 1527 to February 1529, when his elder brother Guillaume replaced him. When his brother departed, he was again Ambassador, from 15 May 1529 to January 1530. He returned on a mission in August–September 1530, and again, as Ambassador Extraordinary, in October 1531. After returning to Court, he was immediately dispatched again to England on 6 November 1531. He was in England again as Ambassador Extraordinary in August and September 1532. A meeting between the English and French monarchs took place at Boulogne on 20 October 1532, at which Bishop du Bellay was present, and immediately thereafter Cardinals Tournon and de Gramont were sent to Rome to negotiate with Pope Clement VII. Du Bellay returned to England from November 1533 to January 1534. In this last embassy, it was his duty to explain the agreements made between Francis I and Pope Clement VII during their negotiations in Marseille in October and November 1533.

=== Rome ===
He was then sent as Ambassador Extraordinary to the Papal Court in Rome (January–May 1534). His mission in both English and Roman embassies was to prevent the implementation of Pope Clement's decree of excommunication against Henry VIII, who was a valuable ally of France against the Emperor Charles. One of the members of du Bellay's suite in his embassy to Rome was François Rabelais, who was making the first of his four journeys to Rome. On their arrival in Rome, they were accommodated in the residence of the Bishop of Faenza Rodolfo Pio di Carpi, the future Cardinal, who had recently returned from a papal embassy to the French Court. Despite the Bishop's best efforts, the Imperial agents, who were well entrenched and vigorous in their advocacy, influenced the papal Consistory to vote to approve the sentence against Henry VIII on 23 March 1534. Henry's plea to await further action until he could send a Procurator to the Papal Court—only a delaying action—was allowed. And so the execution of the bull of excommunication was temporarily suspended.

In September 1534 Bishop du Bellay's secretary, Claude de Chappuys accompanied the French cardinals who were going to Rome for the Conclave that followed the death of Pope Clement VII. There, the Cardinals and Chappuys used their influence to promote the candidacy of the Bishop of Paris for a cardinal's hat. They were assured that the new pope, Pope Paul III, was favourable to their importuning.

=== Cardinal ===
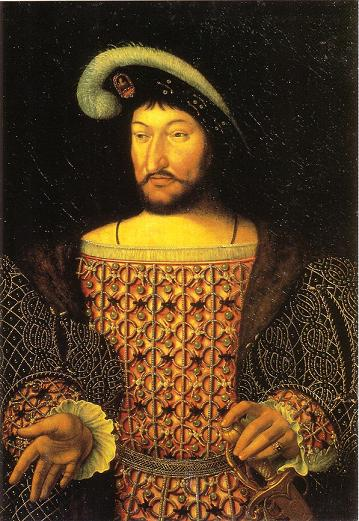
Francis I of France

On 21 May 1535, at his second Consistory for the promotion of cardinals, Pope Paul III created seven new cardinals, among them Jean du Bellay. He was named Cardinal Priest of the titulus of Santa Cecilia in Trastevere on 31 May. His cardinal's hat was sent to him in France on 3 April. Beginning on 27 June he made the journey to Rome, stopping in Ferrara for negotiations with the Duke about the war over Milan, and then moving on to Rome, where he appeared personally for his induction ceremonies at the Consistory of 6 August. He had additional reasons, however, for going to Rome. He was sent by King Francis to seek papal assistance against the aggression of the Emperor Charles V in the struggle for the Duchy of Milan. He was again accompanied by François Rabelais.

On 21 July 1536 du Bellay was nominated "Lieutenant-General" to the king at Paris and in the Île de France, and was entrusted with the organisation of the defence against the Imperialists under the leadership of the Count of Nassau, who, under the direction of the Emperor Charles V, were invading eastern France while Charles was attacking Provence. When his brother Guillaume du Bellay went to Piedmont, Jean was put in charge of the negotiations with the German Protestants, principally through the humanist Johannes Sturm and the historian Johann Sleidan.

In the last years of the reign of Francis I, cardinal du Bellay was in favour with the duchesse d'Étampes, and received a number of benefices: he was Administrator of the bishopric of Limoges on the nomination of the King and with the approval of Pope Paul III on 22 August 1541; he held the diocese until the appointment of Antoine Seguin on 13 August 1544. He was named Administrator of the archbishopric of Bordeaux, and approved by the Pope on 17 December 1544; he held the post until 3 July 1551. He became Bishop of Le Mans on 1 November 1546 upon the resignation of his brother René; he himself resigned in July 1556.

=== Eclipse under Henry II ===
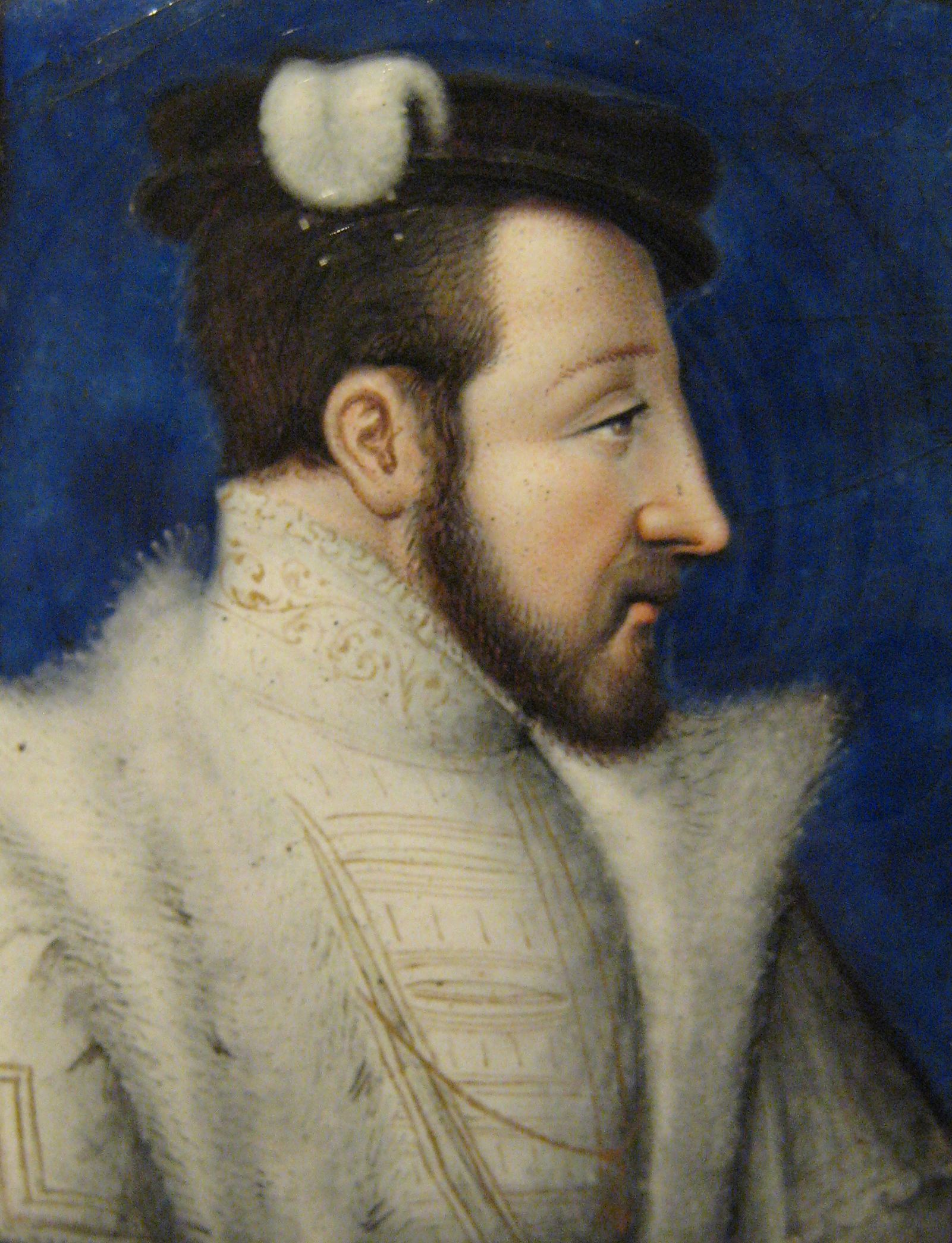
Henry II of France

King Francis I died on 31 March 1547. His funeral ceremonies were conducted at S. Denis on 23 May, and were presided over by Cardinal du Bellay. With the death of King Francis, however, the Cardinal's influence in the council was overshadowed by that of François de Tournon. His niece and patroness, the duchesse d'Étampes was replaced by King Henri's mistress, Diane de Poitiers. The old court favourites had to give way to new favourites. When Henry II announced his new Royal Council (Conseil Privé), du Bellay's name was not among the thirteen councillors admitted to the morning meeting, but only (along with other cardinals, Bourbon, Ferrara and Châtillon) to the meetings which took place after dinner. The only cardinals in the first rank were Tournon and Charles, Duke of Guise Duke of Lorraine, the Archbishop of Rheims. Du Bellay, along with most of councillors of Francis I, found themselves excluded from major decisions. Du Bellay was sent away to Rome (1547), to oversee French affairs before the Holy See. He was not the French Ambassador; that role belonged to Claude d'Urfé (1501–1558). In a letter of 29 April 1549 Secretary of State,Jean du Thiers complained to the King that du Bellay's letters from Rome were voluminous, but contained not one word of substance. His position as a French representative was cancelled when the Cardinal of Ferrara, Ippolito d'Este arrived in Rome. Du Bellay complained bitterly to the King in a letter of 23 August 1549. He returned to France.

Following the death of Pope Paul III in November 1549, Cardinal du Bellay left for Rome once again. He and the other French cardinals were sent by Henry II, who also sent letters to Rome, threatening trouble if the cardinals in Rome did not wait for the French cardinals before they began the Conclave. Du Bellay obtained eight votes as the new pope. This is remarkable, since there were more than twenty Cardinals in the French faction. Evidently he did not have the favour of the French King. The leading candidates were Reginald Pole, Giovanni Morone, and Gian Pietro Carafa; Cardinal du Bellay was not papabile. On 25 February 1550 he was promoted suburbicarian Bishop of Albano by the new pope, Julius III, replacing Cardinal Ennio Filonardi, who died during the Conclave.

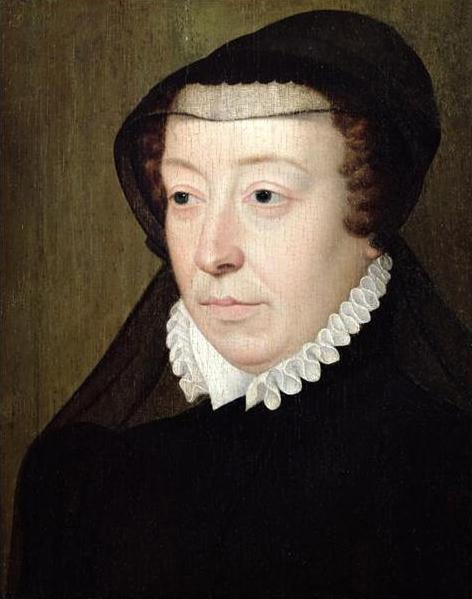
Catherine de' Medici

When Cardinal du Bellay returned to France after the Conclave, he took up residence in his Italian-style villa at Saint-Maur, some seven miles southeast of Paris, where he enjoyed the company of Rabelais, Macrin, Michel l'Hôpital, and his young cousin Joachim du Bellay. King Henry II struck again in 1551, dismissing him from the See of Paris. Catherine de' Medici was a frequent visitor, and in 1563 she purchased the Château du Bellay from his heirs.

After three quiet years passed in retirement in France (1550–1553), the Cardinal was charged with a new mission to Pope Julius III. In Rome he discovered that the Imperialists were in control everywhere, and he was shocked when, on 11 December 1553, Cardinal Carafa was given the See of Ostia and the office of Dean of the College of Cardinals, which Du Bellay believed ought to have been his. He complained in a letter of 22 December 1553 to the Constable de Montmorency.

The Cardinal du Bellay continued to live in Rome thenceforth in great state. In 1555 he was appointed bishop of Ostia and Dean of the College of Cardinals, to fill the position left vacant by the election of Cardinal Giovanni Pietro Carafa to the Papacy as Pope Paul IV. The appointment was disapproved of by Henry II and brought du Bellay into fresh disgrace.

Paul IV died on 18 August 1559 after a contentious reign of four years, two months and twenty-seven days. The Conclave to elect his successor held its opening ceremonies on 5 September 1559 with forty-four cardinals in attendance. On 6 September, Cardinal du Bellay, who was Dean of the College of Cardinals, celebrated the Mass of the Holy Spirit, and then the Conclave settled down to a leisurely conduct of business. They finished the Electoral Capitulations on 8 September, and the bulls referring to conclave rules were read on 9 September. Du Bellay, however, was ill, and did not attend the reading. In the First Scrutiny, held later that day, he had to cast his vote from his sickbed. Beginning on 26 September various ambassadors, led by the Spanish Ambassador, appeared at the entrance to the Conclave area and harangued the cardinals inside about the necessity of getting a pope elected. Security was so bad that on 2 October, the cardinals appointed a reform committee, with Du Bellay its leader, to restore order. It was ineffective. On 9 October the known agents of the Powers and a considerable number of Conclavists were expelled. On 1 November there were forty-seven cardinals at the Conclave, five confined to bed. On the afternoon of Christmas Day, after a good deal of politicking, the cardinals finally settled on Cardinal Giovanni Angelo de' Medici, who was elected by acclamation. He was asked if he would consent to a Scrutiny the next morning, and he agreed, providing that it was recognised that he had been validly and canonically elected on the 25th. He chose the throne name Pius IV. Cardinal du Bellay was absent.

=== Death ===
Cardinal Jean du Bellay died in Rome on 16 February 1560 at 13:30 hours, Rome time, in his gardens at the Baths of Diocletian. He was buried in the Church of Santissima Trinità dei Monti. Since he had died in Rome, the appointment to his vacated benefices, according to the Concordat of Bologna of 1516, belonged to the Pope, not to the King. Pope Pius IV reminded Henry II of this in a letter of 9 August 1560. This was one of the principal reasons that French kings did not want their very richly beneficed cardinals to reside in Rome; as a result, when a Conclave became necessary, either the French party did not arrive in time, or did not bother to come at all. Since they were unknown to most of the cardinals, they were rarely serious candidates for the papal office.

Du Bellay's Last Will and Testament was contested, and his relatives fought over various parts of the inheritance. The Cardinal's sister Louise, who had received the Cardinal's property still kept in the Episcopal Palace in Paris, to ensure her claim to the inheritance, made a donation of the Cardinal's antiquities to the Queen Mother, Catherine de' Medicis.

=== Appreciation ===
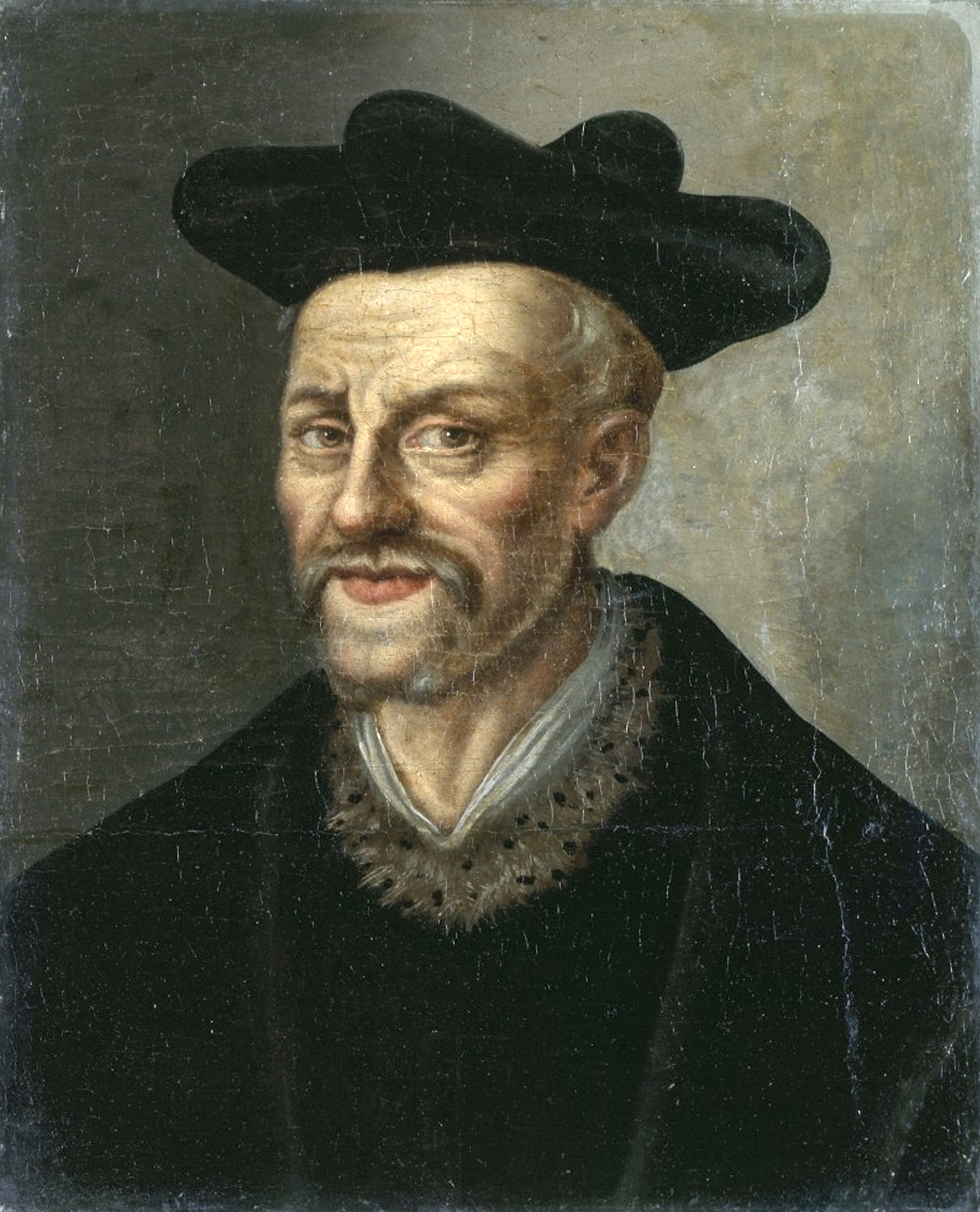
François Rabelais

The Cardinal had brilliant qualities, and an open and free mind. He was on the side of toleration and protected the reformers. Guillaume Budé was his friend, François Rabelais his secretary and doctor; men of letters, like Etienne Dolet, and the poet Salmon Macrin, were indebted to him for assistance. An orator and writer of Latin verse, he left three books of graceful Latin poems (printed with Salmon Macrin's Odes, 1546, by Robert Estienne), and some other compositions, including Francisci Francorum regis epistola apologetica (1542). His voluminous correspondence, now being published, is remarkable for its verve and quality.

==== Du Bellay and François Rabelais ====
Rabelais travelled frequently to Rome with his friend Cardinal Jean du Bellay, and lived for a short time in Turin with du Bellay's brother, Guillaume, during which François I was his patron. Rabelais probably spent some time in hiding, threatened by being labelled a heretic. Only the protection of du Bellay saved Rabelais after the condemnation of his novel by the Sorbonne. They put Gargantua and Pantagruel on their index in 1542, the Third Book in 1546–1547, and the Fourth Book in 1552.

Rabelais was under scrutiny by the church due to "humanistic" nature of his writings. Rabelais's main work of this nature is the Gargantua and Pantagruel series, which contain a great deal of allegorical, suggestive messages.

== Bibliography ==
- Best, A.-M. (1966). "Additional Documents on the Life of Claude Chappuys". Bibliothèque d'Humanisme et Renaissance. 28 (1): 134–140. JSTOR 41429867.
- Bourilly, Victor-Louis (1901). "Jean Sleidan et le Cardinal du Bellay: Premier séjour de Jean Sleidan en France". Bulletin Historique et Littéraire (Société de l'Histoire du Protestantisme Français). 50 (5): 225–242. JSTOR 24286271.
- Bourrilly, Victor-Louis (1905). Guillaume du Bellay: seigneur de Langey, 1491–1543 (in French). Paris: Société nouvelle de librairie et d'édition. p. 237.
- Bourrilly, Victor-Louis (1907). Le cardinal Jean du Bellay en Italie (juin 1535-mars 1536) (in French). Paris: Honoré Champion.
- Brown, Rawdon, ed. (1871). Calendar of State Papers and Manuscripts, Relating to English Affairs, Existing in the Archives and Collections of Venice: And in Other Libraries of Northern Italy. 1527/1533. Vol. IV. London: Longman Green.
- Dickinson, Gladys (1960). Du Bellay in Rome. Leiden: E. J. Brill.
- Du Bellay, Jean (1905). Victor-Louis Bourrilly and Pierre de Vaissière (ed.). Ambassades en Angleterre: la première ambassade, septembre 1529 – février 1529; correspondance diplomatique (in French). Paris: A. Picard.
- Du Bellay, Jean (1969). Rene Scheurer (ed.). Correspondance du cardinal Jean Du Bellay publiée ...: 1529–1535 (in French and Latin). Vol. I. Paris: C. Klincksieck.
- Du Bellay, Jean (1973). Correspondance Du Cardinal Jean Du Bellay: 1535- 1536 (in French). Vol. II. Paris: Klincksieck "Soc. d'histoire de France".
- Du Bellay, Jean (1969). Remy Scheurer and Loris Petris (ed.). Correspondance du cardinal Jean Du Bellay publiée ...: 1537–1547 (in French and Latin). Vol. Tome III. Librairie Droz. ISBN 978-2-35407-111-0.
- Du Bellay, Jean (2015). Rene Scheurer and Loris Petris (ed.). Correspondance du cardinal Jean du Bellay: Tome VI : 1550–1555 (in French and Latin). Paris: Société de l'histoire de France. ISBN 978-2-35407-140-0.
- Dubois-Geoffroy, Claude (2014). L'épée et la mitre au service du roi. Les quatre frères Du Bellay, gloires du Maine au 16ème siècle (in French). lulu.com. ISBN 978-2-9543286-1-4.
- Gulik, Guilelmus van; Konrad Eubel (1923). L. Schmitz-Kallenberg (ed.). Hierarchia catholica medii aevi (in Latin). Vol. III (editio altera ed.). Münster: sumptibus et typis librariae Regensbergianae.
- Hamy, Alfred (1898). Entrevue de François Premier Avec Henry VIII, À Boulogne-sur-Mer, en 1532: Intervention de la France Dans L'affaire Du Divorce, D'après Un Grand Nombre de Documents Inédits (in French). Paris: Lucien Gougy.
- Legrand, Joachim (1688). Histoire du divorce de Henry VIII, roy d'Angleterre & de Catherine d'Arragon (in French). Vol. 2 volumes. Paris: Veuve d'Edmé Martin. [publishes fifty letters of du Bellay]
- Michon, Cédric, Petris, Loris (edd.) (2014), Le Cardinal Jean Du Bellay. Diplomatie et culture dans l'Europe de la Renaissance. Rennes: Presses universitaires de Rennes. 978-2-86906-305-1 [eighteen articles, in French]
- Pauwels, Yves. "Philibert de l'Orme et ses cardinaux : Marcello Cervini et Jean du Bellay," in Frédérique Lemerle, Yves Pauwels et Gennaro Toscano (dir.) (2009). Les Cardinaux de la Renaissance et la modernité artistique, Villeneuve d'Ascq, IRHiS-Institut de Recherches Historiques du Septentrion (" Histoire et littérature de l'Europe du Nord-Ouest", no. 40), p. 149–156. (in French)
- Picot, Emile (1906). Les Francais Italianisants au XVI Siecle (in French). Vol. Tome I. Paris: Champion.
- Potter, David L. "Jean du Bellay et l'Angleterre, 1527–50", in Loris Petris, P. Galand, O. Christin, and C. Michon (eds), Actes du Colloque Jean du Bellay (Neuchâtel, 2014), pp. 47–66. (in French)
- Ribier, Guillaume, ed. (1666). Lettres et memoires d'estat, des Roys, Princes, Ambassadeurs et autres ministres sous les Regnes de François I., Henry II. et François II (in French). Vol. Tome second. Paris: François Clouzier. [letters to and from the Cardinal]

=== Attribution ===
- [Caution should be used; the content is obsolete.]

Catholic Church titles
Preceded by Hector d'Ailly de Rochefort	Bishop of Bayonne; 1524–1532	Succeeded by Etienne de Poncher
Preceded by Charles de Gramont	Administrator of the diocese of Bordeaux; 1544–1553	Succeeded by Jean de Montluc
Preceded by François de Mauny	Administrator of the diocese of Bordeaux; 1558–1560	Succeeded by Antoine Prévost de Sansac
Preceded by René du Bellay	Bishop of Le Mans; 1542–1556	Succeeded by Charles d'Angennes de Rambouillet
Preceded by Jean de Langeac	Administrator of the diocese of Limoges; 1541–1544	Succeeded by Antoine Sanguin
Preceded by François Poncher	Bishop of Paris; 1532–1541	Succeeded by Eustache du Bellay
Preceded by Ennio Filonardi	Cardinal-bishop of Albano; 1550–1553	Succeeded by Rodolfo Pio
Preceded by Gian Pietro Carafa	Cardinal-bishop of Frascati; 1553	Succeeded by Rodolfo Pio
Preceded by Gian Pietro Carafa	Cardinal-bishop of Porto; 1553–1555	Succeeded by Rodolfo Pio
Preceded by Gian Pietro Carafa	Cardinal-bishop of Ostia; 1555–1560	Succeeded by François de Tournon
