= Geoffrey IV =

Geoffrey IV may refer to:

- Geoffrey IV, Viscount of Châteaudun (died 1176)
- Geoffrey IV, Count of Anjou (died 1106)
- Geoffrey IV of Joinville (died 1190), crusader
- Geoffrey IV of La Tour Landry (fl. 1330–1402), knight and author on chivalry
