= Hugh V of Châteaudun =

Châteaudun coat of arms

Hugues IV (died 1180), Viscount of Châteaudun, son of Geoffrey III, Viscount of Châteaudun, and Helvise, Dame of Mondoubleau, daughter of Ilbert “Payen” de Mondoubleau. He became Lord of Mondoubleau upon his mother's death, based on her inheritance, and acquired the lordship of Saint-Calais by marriage.

Hugues’ father, in a conflict with his uncle Urso, Seigneur de Fréteval, was captured and imprisoned. He was rescued by Hugues with the help of Geoffroy III, Count of Vendôme.

Hugues took his first trip to the Holy Land with his father in 1140. In 1159, Hugues’ second trip to the Holy Land was accompanied by encroachments of his land by his third cousin Rotrou IV, Count of Perche. In response, Hugues captured the land of Villemans, to the detriment of the church and priory of the Holy Sepulchre of Châteaudun. Yves, Abbot of Saint-Denis Nogent-le-Rotrou, supported Rotrou is this dispute. The affair ended in 1166 through a judgement of Theobald V, Count of Blois and his brother William of the White Hands, then Bishop of Chartres.

He founded the Commanderie d’Arville of the Knights Templar in 1135 on land donated earlier by his father. The Commanderie remains a unique monument and one of the best preserved Commanderie in France. In 1118, nine French knights led by Hugues de Payens created a religious militia which was to become the Order of Solomon's Temple, or Knights Templar. The members of the order were monks and soldiers and obeyed the rules elaborated by a council gathered at Troyes Cathedral in France in January 1128.

The Templars settled in Arville around 1130 on an estate of 2500 acres, given for their disposal by Hugues’ father Geoffrey (referred to as Lord of Mondoubleau in local historical records). The Commanderie became a farming center, a recruitment center, a place of worship, and a training base for the knights waiting for their departure to the Holy Land. The Templars lived here until their arrest, accused of heresy by Philip IV of France in 1307.

At the request of Theobald V, he imprisoned Sulpice II d’Amboise and his sons in a dungeon of the castle of Chateaudun in order to force him to transfer his Chateau de Chaumont to Theobald's control. Sulpice was killed in 1153 after being tortured, but with his chateau's ownership intact. His sons were released upon intervention by their cousin Henry Plantagenet, future King of England.

In 1154, Hugues married Marguerite de Saint-Calais, daughter of Sylvestre de Saint-Calais, and heiress to the lordship of Saint-Calais. Hugues and Marguerite had six children

- Geoffrey IV, Viscount of Châteaudun
- Hugh VI, Viscount of Châteaudun
- Payen (d. 1190 or after), Lord of Mondoubleau
- Eudes (d. before 1175)
- Hélvise (d. after 1163)
- Alix (d. after 1176).

Given the ties of Hugues’ family with the Knights Templar, the common use of the name Payen, and the relationships with the House of Montdidier (see Geoffrey II, Count of Perche), it is possible that Payen de Montdidier, one of the founding nine knights, is related to the family.

Hughes was a benefactor of the Abbey of Tiron (see Tironensian Order) and he, like his father before him, is buried at the abbey. He was succeeded by his son Hugh.

== Sources ==
- Livingstone, Amy (2010). Out of Love for My Kin: Aristocratic Family Life in the Lands of the Loire, 1000-1200. Cornell University Press.
- Settipani, Christian, Les vicomtes de Châteaudun et leurs alliés, dans Onomastique et Parenté dans l'Occident médiéval, Oxford, Linacre, Unit for Prosopographical Research, 2000
- Europäische Stammtafeln, Vol. III, Les Vicomtes de Châteaudun
- Histoire du Perche, Par Philippe Siguret, Michel Fleury, Publié par Fédération des amis du Perche, 2000
- Commanderie d’Arville
