= Arville =

Arville may refer to:

- Arville, Loir-et-Cher, a commune of the Loir-et-Cher département, in France
- Arville, Seine-et-Marne, a commune of the Seine-et-Marne département, in France
- Arville, Wallonia, a district of the municipality of Saint-Hubert, Belgium, province of Luxembourg
