= Geoffrey III, Viscount of Châteaudun =

Viscount of Châteaudun (1090–1141)

Geoffrey III (Geoffroy III) (died 1145), Viscount of Châteaudun, son of Hugh IV, Viscount of Châteaudun, and Agnes, Comtesse de Fréteval, daughter of Foucher, Seigneur de Fréteval, and Hildeburge Goët. Geoffrey was also Seigneur of Mondoubleau by virtue of his marriage. This resulted in a significant increase in the holdings of the family of Châteaudun.

Geoffrey battled his cousin Urso, Seigneur de Fréteval, son of Nivelon III de Fréteval, brother of Geoffrey’s mother, resulting in his capture in 1136. Geoffrey's son Hugues managed to rescue his father with the help of Geoffroy III, Count of Vendome. Geoffrey and his family were closely associated with the Church of Saint-Léonard de Bellême, built circa 960 by Yves de Creil, donating it to the town of Marmoutier in 1092.

Although not generally known, Geoffrey was an important figure in the founding of the Knights Templar. After the crusaders had captured Jerusalem in July 1099, western Christians flocked in the Holy Land for pilgrimage and their safety was certainly endangered. To protect them, nine French knights, led by Hugues de Paynes, created in 1118 a religious militia which was to become later the Order of the Temple. The members of the Order are monks and soldiers and obeyed rules elaborated by a council gathered at Troyes Cathedral in France in January 1128.

The Templars settled in Arville between 1128 and 1130, on a wooded estate of 2500 acres given to them by Geoffroy. The Commanderie d’Arvill, as it was known, became a training base for the knights waiting for their departure to the Holy Land. The Templars lived here until their arrest by Philip IV, King of France, who accused them of heresy, on Friday 13 October 1307.

Geoffrey married Helvise, Lady of Mondoubleau (Héloïse de Mondoubleau), daughter of Ilbert Payen de Mondoubleau. Helvise’s grandfather was Nivelon II de Fréteval, brother of Geoffrey’s maternal grandfather Foucher. Geoffrey and Helvise had six children:

- Hugh V, Viscount of Châteaudun
- Alpais (d. after 1134)
- Heloise (d. 1129 or after)
- Hubert Payen (d. after 1145)
- Guillaume
- Mathilde (d. 1154 or 1156), married Mathieu II de Beaumont, Grand Chamberman of France, son of Mathieu I, Count of Beaumont, and Beatrix of Clermont (daughter of Hugh, Count of Clermont-en-Beauvaisis). The son of Mathilde and Mathieu, Mathieu III, Count of Beaumont, was the fourth husband of Eleanor, Countess of Vermandois.

As noted above, Helvise's dowry represented a substantial increase of land of Châteaudun.

In 1145, Geoffroy II de Lèves, Bishop of Chartres, excommunicated Geoffrey. On his deathbed, Geoffrey became a monk at Tiron Sainte-Trinité (see Tironensian Order), making peace with the abbey and therefore the bishop. Geoffrey was succeeded as Viscount of Châteaudun by his son Hugues upon his death.

== Sources ==
- Settipani, Christian, Les vicomtes de Châteaudun et leurs alliés, dans Onomastique et Parenté dans l'Occident médiéval, Oxford, Linacre, Unit for Prosopographical Research, 2000
- Association of Friends of the Perche, Chapelle Saint-Santin, Cahiers Percherons, No. 52, Belleme II, 1976
- Europäische Stammtafeln, Vol. III, Les Vicomtes de Châteaudun
- Commanderie d’Arville
