= Oigny =

Oigny may refer to the following places in France:

- Oigny, Côte-d'Or, a commune in the Côte-d'Or department
- Oigny, Loir-et-Cher, a commune in the Loir-et-Cher department
