= François de Tournon =

French Augustinian friar, an archbishop, diplomat, courtier and cardinal

His Eminence François de Tournon
- Cardinal-Bishop of Ostia e Velletri; Archbishop of Lyon
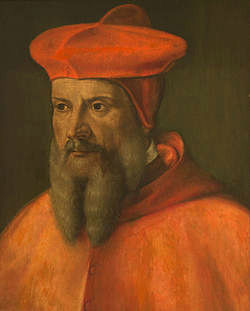
- Archdiocese: Embrun (1518-1525); Bourges (1526-1537); Auch (1538-1551); Lyon (1551-1562)
- Diocese: Sabina (1550-1560); Ostia e Velletri (1560-1562)

Orders
- Created cardinal: 1530 by Pope Clement VII

Personal details
- Born: 1489 Tournon-sur-Rhône, France
- Died: 22 April 1562 (aged 72–73) Saint-Germain-en-Laye, France
- Buried: College de Tournon, Tournon FR
- Parents: Jacques, Comte de Roussilon; Jeanne de Polignac

François de Tournon (1489 in Tournon-sur-Rhône – 1562 in Saint-Germain-en-Laye) was a French Augustinian friar, an archbishop, diplomat, courtier, and cardinal. From 1536 he was also a military supply officer of French forces operating in Provence, Savoy and Piedmont. In the same year he founded the Collège de Tournon. For a period he was effectively France's foreign minister. He was a prominent leader in the fight against Lutheranism and Calvinism, especially at the French Royal Court, and what he perceived as the growing Huguenot menace to both doctrinal orthodoxy and the social order. He took a prominent role in the Estates General of 1560, the Colloquy of Poissy and the Colloquy of Saint-Germain in 1562. He participated in the papal conclaves of 1534, 1549, and 1559.

== Early life ==
He was the son of Jacques, seigneur de Tournon and Comte de Rousillon, and Jeanne de Polignac, daughter of Guillaume-Armand, Comte de Polignac. Comte Jacques served with the French armies in the Italian wars, where he died. François was their fifth son. The eldest son Christophe assumed the family titles and became a soldier. The elder brother Just died at the Battle of Pavia. Two of his brothers were also in holy orders, Gaspard (who became Bishop of Valence, 1505-1520) and Charles (who became Bishop of Rodez, 1501-1504). He was home-schooled by his mother and tutors. At the age of twelve, François entered the Order of S. Antoine en Viennois, where he came under the tutelage of Abbot Theodore Mitte de S. Chamond (1495-1527). In due course, François de Tournon became Preceptor of the monastery, and then became the 21st Abbot of the Order of S. Antoine in 1542, a position which he continued to hold until 1555. By command of Pope Boniface VIII (1295-1303) the members of the Order of S. Antoine followed the Rule of S. Augustine and were considered Canons Regular of S. Augustine (CRSA).

=== Archbishop of Embrun ===
François was Canon of Avignon, when he was elected Archbishop of Embrun in 1518 at the age of twenty-eight. His election was confirmed by Pope Leo X in Consistory on 30 July 1518. He served as archbishop until 1525.

He was appointed the first commendatory abbot of la Chaise-Dieu in 1519 by King Francis I of France. In 1533 he was host to a visit from King Francis. He resigned the abbey in 1541, in favor of Charles de Tournon, his nephew. The abbey was sacked by the Huguenots in the Third War of Religion, on 1 August 1562, three months after the death of François de Tournon.

Following the defeat and capture of King Francis I in the Battle of Pavia on 24 February 1525, Monseigneur de Tournon, Archbishop of Embrun, was summoned to membership in the Council of the King. He joined the Queen-mother, Louise of Savoy, the King's sister Marguerite, Marguerite's husband the Duc d'Alençon, the Constable Montmorency, and the First President of the Parliament of Paris. Their unpleasant task was to negotiate with the Emperor Charles V for the release of their King, who had been taken prisoner to Spain. Queen Louise sent Tournon to Madrid to lead the negotiations. This was finally achieved in the Treaty of Madrid on 14 January 1526.

=== Archbishop of Bourges ===
On 8 January 1526, the translation of Archbishop de Tournon from Embrun to Bourges was approved by Pope Paul III in Consistory. At the death of the previous Archbishop of Bourges in 1525, the Canons had gathered to elect his successor. There was a disputed election, some of the electors supporting Canon Jacques de Brolio, and the greater number supporting Archbishop François de Tournon of Embrun. As was usual in such cases, the matter was referred to Rome. Pope Clement VII had the case investigated, and he found in favor of Tournon, though Brolio then appealed to a future general council. The pope had had enough, and he sanctioned the move of Tournon to Bourges, where he was installed by proxy on 16 April 1526. He took solemn possession in person on 19 May. On 21 March 1528 he presided over a council in Bourges, at which the new heresies of Martin Luther were denounced and anathematized.

In 1529, Archbishop de Tournon was sent as Ambassador Extraordinary to the Court of Madrid to obtain the release of the two eldest sons of King Francis, who were hostages of their father's good behavior. Tournon escorted them back to France, along with the sister of the Emperor, Eleanor of Austria, who married King Francis on 4 July 1530.

== Cardinal ==
Archbishop François de Tournon was one of five prelates created a cardinal in the Consistory of 9 March 1530 by Pope Clement VII. The Consistory was held in Bologna, where the pope had come to crown Charles V as Holy Roman Emperor. In the Consistory of 16 May, Tournon was named Cardinal Priest of SS. Marcellino e Pietro. He did not participate in the ceremony of the closing and opening of the mouth, by which he gained the right to speak in Consistory, until 13 January 1533.

=== England, France and Rome ===
As soon as he became a cardinal, François de Tournon was drawn into the affairs of the King of England. Henry VIII wanted a divorce from the Emperor's aunt, Catherine of Aragon. The one person who might have been able to manage the intricacies of the Roman Curia on his behalf, Cardinal Thomas Wolsey, had been imprudently cast aside. Henry desperately needed someone else to deal with the Curia for him. He tried getting a cardinal of his own: the Bishop of Worcester, Girolamo Ghinucci; Gregory di Casale; Giambattista Casale; Giovanni Matteo Giberti, Bishop of Verona; and Stephen Gardiner. The King was successful with none of them, facing opposition from the Emperor, the Curia, and even the families of the would-be cardinals. Finally Henry realized that he would have to rely on someone else's resources, and he turned to King Francis I. A meeting between the two monarchs took place at Boulogne on 20 October 1532, in which it was agreed that the two new French cardinals, Gramont and Tournon, should be sent to Rome to publicize the new rapprochement between England and France, to remove opposition to 'the King's great matter', and to bring about an alliance between France and the Papacy through the marriage of the pope's niece and the King's son. Pope Clement was to be invited to Nice to meet with King Francis, and perhaps with Henry VIII.

On 6 November 1532, therefore, the cardinals de Tournon and Gabriel de Gramont set off as Ambassadors to the Holy See; they had a joint commission. On 21 November, it was reported that they had left Paris. It was at the beginning of the visit to Rome, on 13 January 1533, that Tournon first took his seat in Consistory. Pope Clement, who was caught between the Emperor and the King of France, was in no hurry to make up his mind either about the marriage or about a visit to France. In the meantime, Cardinal de Tournon was making proposals in Consistory against the Lutherans in France. Tournon was still attending Consistory on 13 August, or rather, diplomatically absenting himself whenever the English matter came up for discussion. On 17 August, he reported that the pope had said that the King of England had forced him to do what he did. On 27 September, he wrote to the King from Pisa, informing him that the pope had personally told him that he was willing to accommodate the desires of the French king to the extent possible, but that the matter of the divorce of Henry VIII was a matter for Consistory, and that the cardinals were against it. The culmination of these efforts was the papal visit to Marseille in October 1533, and the marriage of Henri of France and Catherine de' Medici on 28 October 1533. During the visit, on 7 November, four new French cardinals were created. The pope met with King Francis and (separately) with the Emperor Charles—but not with Henry VIII, who had secretly married Anne Boleyn on 22 November 1532, and publicly married her on 25 January 1533.

=== Conclave of 1534 ===
Pope Clement died in Rome on 25 September 1534. The conclave to elect his successor opened on Monday, 11 October 1534, with between thirty-three and thirty-seven cardinals in attendance. There was a total of forty-six living cardinals, of whom ten did not attend the Conclave at all. The French faction, of which Cardinal Tournon was a member, could count on between ten and twelve votes. According to the Bishop of Aosta, Pietro Gazino, the French intended to vote for Cardinal de Tournon, and, if his candidacy should fail, for Cardinal Sanseverino. Cardinal Jean de Lorraine was the official leader of the French, but the management of affairs was in the hands of Cardinal de Tournon. The situation was made less complicated when the leaders of the Imperial party, Cardinal Bernhard von Cles and Cardinal Matthaeus Lang von Wellenberg, arrived without bringing any instructions from the Emperor. The Spanish Ambassador and the Imperial Ambassador put their heads together, and decided that Cles should be their candidate. But it was too late. After mass on Monday morning, the Bull of Julius II against simony was read out, and the cardinals adopted the Electoral Capitulations which had been put forward in 1513 without discussion or dissent. In the early evening of Monday, 11 October, the cardinals reached a unanimous agreement on the choice of Cardinal Alessandro Farnese, the Dean of the College of Cardinals. They sent Ippolito de' Medici and Jean de Lorraine to convey their wishes to Farnese, and they invited him to come with them to the chapel. There the election by acclamation was formally witnessed by three Masters of Ceremonies, who were also Protonotaries Apostolic. But the next morning, Tuesday, 12 October, a regular ballot was conducted, with Cardinal Farnese seated in his usual place as a cardinal. All of the cardinals except Farnese cast a ballot, and there was unanimity. There could be no question that the election was canonical. Farnese chose to be called Paul III.

=== College de Tournon ===
In 1536, Cardinal de Tournon first voiced the idea of founding the Collège de Tournon in his home town. In 1542 the financial foundations of the college were laid when the cardinal transferred to the college the Priory of Andance, which belonged to his Abbey of La Chaise-Dieu. The cardinal was most careful to obtain the permission of Pope Paul III for this transaction, and then sensibly persuaded King Francis I to ratify the donation by Letters Patent, which were dated 4 February 1544. The first building was completed in 1548. Again, the cardinal was careful to persuade Pope Julius III (1549-1555) to issue a Bull in favor of the erection of the Collège de Tournon, which King Henri ordered the Parliament of Toulouse to register by an Arrêt dated 11 April 1553. On 6 January 1559, the cardinal turned the College over to the Jesuits, and they obtained Letters Patent from King Charles IX in 1561 confirming the arrangement.

When Duke Francesco Sforza of Milan died on 24 October 1535, King Francis decided to renew the Italian Wars. Cardinal de Tournon was appointed Governor and Lieutenant General of the Lyonnais and surrounding territories, and assigned to raise money, troops and supplies for the Italian War. When the French invaded Savoy, Charles V retaliated by invading and seizing Provence, which put the cardinal in a most dangerous situation. Charles managed to lead his army as far north as Aix en Provence, but Francis occupied Avignon and prepared for a major battle. Charles chose to retreat back to Italy, whence he had come. Tournon's operations were successful in helping to drive the Imperialists out, while the French army in Italy made progress in securing the Piedmont. Paul III was eager to establish a peace, since he believed that a war against the Turks and efforts against the Protestant heretics were more important pursuits. He sent Cardinal Jacobazzi to the Emperor and Cardinal Carpi to King Francis, to induce them to come to Nice. He had negotiated with the Duke of Savoy to have the citadel of Nice placed at his disposal, to which the Duke had agreed; the Duke, however, did not carry out his commitment out of fear of what the French or the Spanish might attempt. The war was finally settled by The Truce of Nice, signed on 18 June 1538 by Francis I and Charles V, through the mediation of Pope Paul III.

Cardinal de Tournon was appointed Archbishop of Auch on 14 June 1538. The pallium was granted to him by Pope Paul III on 30 March 1541. Tournon held the post until his resignation in April 1551. His resignation was contingent upon his receipt of an annual payment of 10,000 livres Tournois.

In 1540 Francis I appointed Cardinal de Tournon Chancellor of the Ordre de Saint-Michel.

From 1543 to 1556 the cardinal's attending physician was the famous Guillaume Rondelet.

On 22 July 1544 Cardinal de Tournon was elected abbot of the Benedictine Abbey (Congregation of S. Maur) of Ambronay (Ambroniacum) in the Diocese of Lyon by the monks; he held the post until 1550.

King Francis I died on 31 March 1547, and on 2 April 1547 the cardinal received an ordonnance in council of Henri II that he was to retire to his estates. He was out of favor with the new King. He retired to one of his monasteries, the Abbey of Tournus, which he had acquired in 1535, and did not engage in political affairs.

In 1548 the cardinal was ordered to represent the King of France, now Henri II, at the peace negotiations which took place in Nice, with the Emperor and the pope. He was successful in arranging a ten years peace.

=== Conclave of 1549-1550 ===
When Pope Paul III died on 10 November 1549, at the age of eighty-one, Cardinal de Tournon and seven other cardinals set out for Rome and the Conclave. Forty-two cardinals entered Conclave on 29 November 1549. Cardinals de Guise, du Bellay, Vendôme, Chastillon and Tournon arrived on 12 December. Another French Cardinal, Georges d'Armagnac, arrived on 28 December. Cardinal Louis de Bourbon de Vendôme, who was the French candidate (or so Cardinal de Guise had been advised by the King) was one of the latest arrivals, not reaching Rome until 14 January 1550. Tournon's name had been given to Guise as an alternate, if Bourbon de Vendome's candidacy should falter. In fact neither had a chance. Queen Catherine apparently favored Cardinal Ridolfi (who died on 31 January 1550) and then Cardinal d'Este (who was a non-starter). The leading candidates in the voting were Reginald Pole (the Imperial favorite), Giovanni Morone, and Gian Pietro Carafa. As happened so frequently, the French and the Imperialists excluded each other's candidates. It would be Cardinal Farnese, or rather, whichever party could make an arrangement with Farnese for his votes, who would decide the election. Farnese knew that he could not become pope himself, but he was determined that a member of his group would. The French and Farnese tried Marcello Cervini, but the Imperialists would have none of it. It had come down to a choice between two unpalatable candidates: Cervini and del Monte. On 7 February 1550 the required two-thirds majority elected Cardinal Giovanni Maria Ciocchi del Monte, who chose the throne name Julius III.

On 28 February 1550, Cardinal de Tournon was promoted suburbicarian Bishop of Sabina by Pope Julius III. There had suddenly been two new vacancies: Cardinal del Monte had been elected Pope, and Cardinal Ennio Filonardi had died during the Conclave. Cardinal Carafa, the Bishop of Sabina, had moved up to the See of Palestrina, which had been vacated by Cardinal del Monte. Cardinal de Tournon remained in Rome for the next three years, being recalled to France by Catherine de' Medici and King Francis II in 1559

=== Archbishop of Lyon ===
On 11 May 1551, the appointment of Cardinal de Tournon as Archbishop of Lyon and Primate of all the Gauls was approved in Consistory by Pope Julius III. On 28 September 1552, Cardinal de Tournon made his solemn entry into his new diocese. His appointment relieved Cardinal Ippolito d'Este of the Administratorship which he had held since 1539. On the death of Cardinal de Tournon, Cardinal d'Este resumed the Administratorship.

In 1554 Tournon was elected Abbot of the monastery of Athanacum (Ainay) in the diocese of Lyon. He held the post until his death.

=== Conclaves of 1555 ===
Tournon's friend Pope Julius III (del Monte) died on Saturday, 23 March 1555, at the age of 68. In 1554, when sending Cardinal Georges d'Armagnac to Rome as his Ambassador, Henri II instructed him to inform the cardinals that his first choice as the next Pope was Cardinal d'Este, and, failing that, his choice was Cardinal de Tournon. The Conclave began on Friday 5 April 1555, with thirty-seven cardinals in attendance. Cardinal de Tournon was not among them. A bull had been procured from Julius III in November 1554, allowing for an extra fifteen days after the conclusion of the Novendiales (nine days of official mourning) for those who needed to travel a great distance to make the journey. In April 1555 the Bull was ignored by the College of Cardinals. Only two French cardinals, therefore, were actually present, Jean du Bellay and Georges d'Armagnac. The favorite of Charles V and Philip II was again Reginald Pole, who, unfortunately, was not in attendance; he was legate in England, guiding the government of Queen Mary I in its return to the Roman Church. On the evening of 9 April Cardinal Marcello Cervini was elected pope by "adoration", and the next morning was elected unanimously in a ballot. He chose the name Marcellus II, but he reigned only twenty-two days, dying in the night of 30 April - 1 May 1555.

Louis I, Cardinal of Guise arrived in Rome on 21 April 1555. If the Bull of Julius III had been obeyed, and an additional fifteen days taken, Cardinal Louis would have been in time to participate in the first Conclave. He wrote to his brother Charles, Cardinal of Lorraine on the 25th, while Pope Marcellus was still alive, to get King Henri to send the French cardinals as soon as possible. Cardinal Alessandro Farnese wrote the same thing, also while Marcellus II was alive, to the King directly. There were eight more cardinals at the second Conclave of 1555, but only two of them were French, Guise-Lorraine and Robert de Lenoncourt (who arrived on 22 May). Carpi, Pole and Morone were again the Imperial favorites. D'Este was again the French candidate. Carafa and Alvarez were running as radical reformers; both were Inquisitors. Forty-five cardinals were present for the opening of the Second Conclave on 15 May. Cardinal du Bellay, ambitious to be Dean of the Sacred College, abandoned the French faction and put his support behind Carafa. On 23 May, Cardinal Carafa was elected, and chose the throne name Paul IV. Tournon had taken no part. He was still in France, at La Ferte-Hauterive, on 20 April.

In 1559 François de Tournon was appointed Abbot of the Benedictine monastery of Reomaus in the diocese of Langres by Pope Pius IV, a post he held until his death in 1562. On 13 March 1560, Cardinal de Tournon was promoted to the suburbicarian See of Ostia by Pope Pius IV (Medici).

=== Estates General, 1560 ===
The new Pope, Pius IV, became increasingly alarmed at the growing Huguenot power in France, and in mid-June 1560 appointed two joint legates to go to France as Inquisitors General to deal with the problem. The legates were Cardinal François de Tournon and Cardinal Charles de Lorraine. The latter was already in France. Tournon left Rome on 25 July, and arrived at the French Court in Orléans on 24 October.

On 13 December 1560 the first meeting of the Estates General since 1484 began at Orleans. The King and Queen were present, along with five cardinals. Cardinal de Tournon presided, as the senior cleric present. Chancellor l'Hôpital gave a long address in the name of the government. Then the Baron de Rochefort, Jacques de Silly, spoke in the name of the Nobility, or rather, he spoke under the inspiration of the Admiral de Coligny, the leader of the Huguenots. He criticized the disorder of the clergy, and demanded a National Council to address the demands of the new Reform. Jean Quintin, Professor of Canon Law at the University of Paris, was selected to present the Speech on behalf of the Clergy, which was to refute de Rochefort. The text, it seems, was prepared under the inspiration of cardinal de Lorraine. It is stated by Fleury that Cardinal de Tournon was responsible for the selection.

=== Religious controversies ===
Beginning from his assumption of the cardinal's hat in 1530, Cardinal de Tournon had been in a position to see and to disapprove of some of the doings at the royal court and elsewhere among the aristocracy. Calvinism and Lutheranism had been making inroads among the aristocracy, and in particular with King Francis' only sister Marguerite de Navarre. Around 1535 she had become sufficiently emboldened that she requested the King for permission to invite Philipp Melanchthon, Luther's closest associate, to Court. She wished to have him discuss his theology and debate with orthodox Christians. Tournon felt compelled to intervene, however dangerous the prospect might be, and he delicately persuaded the King that showing any favor or even lenience toward Protestants would be a bad idea. The most famous of these confrontations, however, came at the end of the cardinal's life. From 9 September 1561 to 9 October 1561 Cardinal François de Tournon was one of six cardinals, including the Papal Legate Cardinal Ippolito d'Este, who attended the Colloquy of Poissy, which had been summoned by Queen Mother Catherine de' Medici and her Chancellor Michel de l'Hôpital in an attempt to bring about a reconciliation between Catholics and Calvinists (Huguenots) in France. At the first session, however, when Theodore Beza, John Calvin's French disciple, was explaining the Calvinist view of the Eucharist, Cardinal de Tournon could not contain himself and launched into a denunciation of Beza's heresies.

A second series of meetings was arranged by Catherine and l'Hôpital which took place at the royal château of Saint-Germain between 27 January and 11 February 1562. The legate, d'Este, and the cardinals participated. On this occasion Beza attacked the cult of images, making no distinction between douleia and latria (worship and reverence), and rejecting the authority of the Second Council of Nicaea. On 11 February, at a meeting of the Queen-mother, Antoine de Bourbon, the Chancellor, and Cardinals de Bourbon and de Tournon, it was decided to terminate the discussions. The possibility of a rapprochement, even if it extended only to practice and not to theology, was even more remote than before. The cardinal became seriously ill during the discussions.

Cardinal de Tournon had written his Last Will and Testament on 21 June 1561. François de Tournon died at Saint-Germain-en-Laye on 21 April 1562, at the age of 73. His body was initially interred in the Abbey of S. Germain, out of fear of marauding bands of Huguenots. Later it was transferred to the Jesuit church at the College de Tournon, which he had founded.

== Bibliography ==
- Saulnier Du Verdier, Gilbert (1653). Histoire des cardinaux illustres qui ont été employez dans les affaires d'Estat... par le sieur Duverdier,... (in French) (nouvelle ed.). Paris: J.-B. Loyson. pp. 255–276.
- Fleury-Ternal, Charles (1728). Tournon. Histoire du cardinal de Tournon (archevêque de Lyon), ministre de France sous quatre de nos rois (in French). Paris: D'Houry.
- Claude de Vic; Joseph i. e. Jean Joseph Vaissette (1745). Histoire generale de Languedoc: avec des notes et les pieces justificatives (in French). Vol. Tome cinquieme. Paris: J. Vincent. p. 161.
- Gattico, Joannes Baptista (1753). Acta selecta caeremonialia sanctae Romanae Ecclesiae, ex variis mss. codicibus et diariis saeculi XV.XVI.XVII. aucta et illustrata pluribus aliis monumentis nondum editis collectore P.D. Joanne Baptista Gattico (in Latin). Vol. Tomus I. Rome: Joannes Laurentius Barbierini.
- Cardella, Lorenzo (1793). Memorie storiche de cardinali della Santa romana chiesa ... (in Italian). Vol. Tomo quarto. Roma: Pagliarini. pp. 114–118.
- Paris, Louis, ed. (1841). Négociations, lettres et pièces diverses relatives au règne de François II: tirées du portefeuille de Sébastien de l'Aubespine (in French). Paris: Imprimerie Royale. pp. 98–105. ISBN 9780598848697.
- Petruccelli della Gattina, Ferdinando (1864). Histoire diplomatique des conclaves (in French). Vol. Second volume. Paris: A. Lacroix, Verboeckhoven et cie.
- Brown, Rawdon, ed. (1871). Calendar of State Papers and Manuscripts, Relating to English Affairs, Existing in the Archives and Collections of Venice: And in Other Libraries of Northern Italy. 1527/1533. Vol. IV. London: Longman Green.
- Massip, Maurice (1890). Le collège de Tournon en Vivarais, d'après les documents originaux inédits. Paris: Alphonse Picard, éditeur.
- Hamy, Alfred (1898). Entrevue de François Premier Avec Henry VIII, À Boulogne-sur Mer, en 1532: Intervention de la France Dans L'affaire Du Divorce, D'après Un Grand Nombre de Documents Inédits (in French). Paris: L. Gougy.
- François, Michel, ed. (1946). Correspondance du cardinal François de Tournon, 1521-62 (in French and Latin). Paris: Honoré Champion.
- François, Michel (1951). Le cardinal François de Tournon: homme d'état, diplomate, mécène et humaniste, 1489-1562 (in French). Paris: De Broccard.
- Scarisbrick, J. J. (1968). Henry VIII. Berkeley-Los Angeles: University of California Press. GGKEY:ZFAB10RZQSL.
- Barbiche, Bernard; de Dainville-Barbiche, Ségolène (1985). "Les légats à latere en France et leurs facultés aux XVIe et XVIIe siècles". Archivum Historiae Pontificiae. 23: 93–165. JSTOR 23564223.
- Malov, Vladimir N. (1987). "Lettres inédites du Cardinal François de Tournon (Juin-Decembre 1552)," Bibliothèque de L'École des Chartes 145 (Paris: Droz 1987), 129-161 (in French).

Catholic Church titles
Preceded by Niccolò Fieschi	Bishop of Embrun; 1517–1525	Succeeded by Antoine de Lévis de Château-Morand
Preceded by François de Bueil	Archbishop of Bourges; 1526–1536	Succeeded by Jacques Leroy
Preceded by Giovanni Pietro Carafa	Cardinal-bishop of Sabina; 1550–1560	Succeeded by Robert de Lenoncourt
Preceded by Jean du Bellay	Cardinal-bishop of Ostia; 1560–1562	Succeeded by Rodolfo Pio
