= Guillaume du Bellay =

French diplomat and general

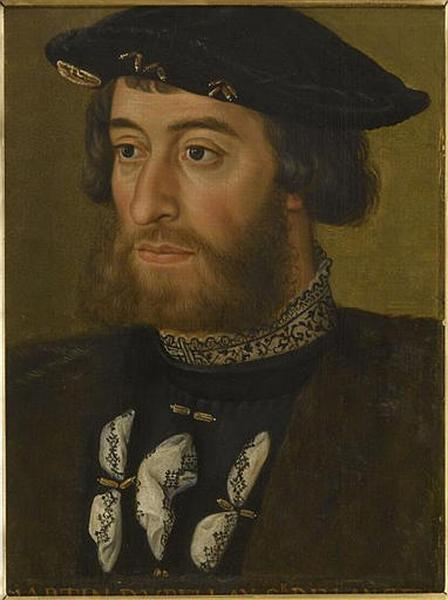
Portrait of Guillaume du Bellay, now in the Musée de Versailles (Oil on wood, c. 1535)

Guillaume du Bellay, seigneur de Langey (1491 – 9 January 1543), was a French diplomat and general from a notable Angevin family under King Francis I.

He was born at the château of Glatigny, near Souday, in 1491. His father, Louis du Bellay-Langey was a younger son of the Angevin family of du Bellay, which from the 14th century was distinguished in the service of the dukes of Anjou and afterwards of the kings of France; and Louis had six sons, who were among the best servants of Francis I. Guillaume, the eldest, is one of the most remarkable figures of the time; a brave soldier, a humanist and a historian, he was above all the most able diplomat at the command of Francis I, prodigiously active, and excelling in secret negotiations. He entered the military service at an early age, was taken prisoner at Pavia in 1525 and shared the captivity of Francis I. His skill and devotion attached him to the king.

His missions to Spain, Italy, England and Germany were innumerable; sent three times to England in 1529–30, occupied with the execution of the treaty of Cambrai and also with the question of Henry VIII’s divorce, and with the help of his brother Jean, then bishop of Paris, he obtained a decision favourable to Henry VIII from the Sorbonne University on 2 July 1530. In 1526, he was paid 2,050 livres by the king for certain "articules" he sent him from Rome, perhaps works of art for Francis' growing collection.

From 1532 to 1536 he went three times to England, but was principally employed in uniting the German princes against Charles V; in May 1532 he signed the treaty of Scheyern with the dukes of Bavaria, the landgrave of Hesse, and the elector of Saxony, and in January 1534 the treaty of Augsburg. During the war of 1537, Francis I sent him on missions to Piedmont; he was governor of Turin from December 1537 until the end of 1539, and subsequently replacing Marshal d’Annebaut as governor of the whole of Piedmont, he displayed great capacity for organization. But at the end of 1542, overwhelmed by work, he was compelled to return to France, and died at Saint-Symphorien-de-Lay near Lyon on 9 January 1543.

Rabelais, an eye-witness, has left a moving story of his death. He was buried in the cathedral of Le Mans, where a monument was erected to his memory, with the inscription, "Ci gît Langey, dont la plume et l’épée Ont surmonté Cicéron et Pompée"; Charles V is said to have remarked that Langey, by his own unaided efforts, had done more mischief and thwarted more schemes than all the French together.

Guillaume du Bellay was the devoted protector of freedom of thought; without actually joining the reformers, he defended the innovators against their fanatical opponents. In 1534–35 he even tried, unsuccessfully, to bring about a meeting between Francis I and Melanchthon; and in 1541 he intervened in favour of the Vaudois. Rabelais was the most famous of his clients, and followed him to Piedmont from 1540 to 1542. Guillaume was himself a valuable historian, and a clear and precise writer. He imitated Livy in his Ogdoades, a history of the rivalry between Francis I and the emperor from 1521, of which, though he had no time to finish it, important fragments remain, inserted by his brother Martin du Bellay (died 1559) in his Mémoires (1569).
