= Couëtron-au-Perche =

- Commune
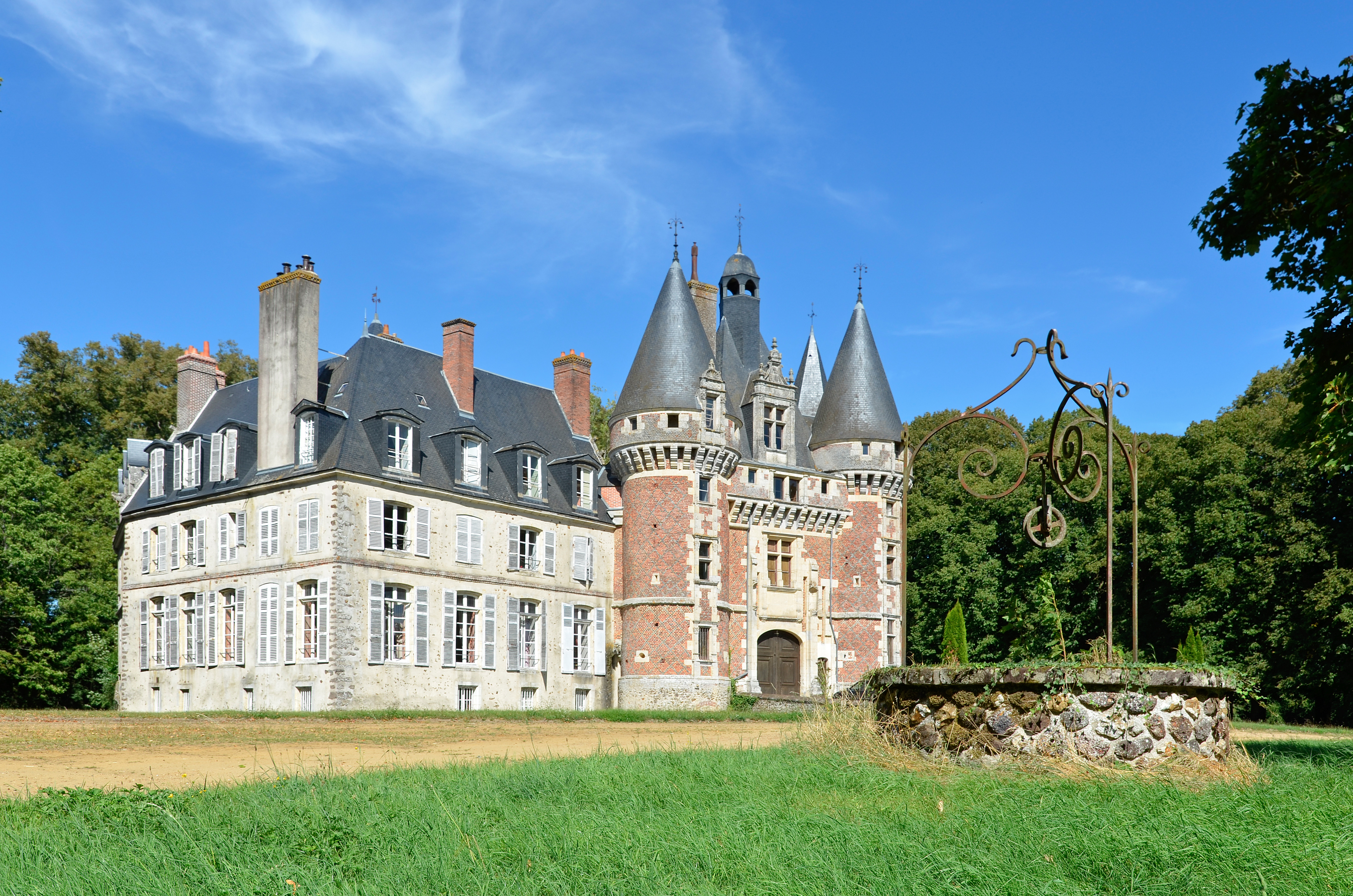
- Location of Couëtron-au-Perche
- Location within France Location within Centre-Val de Loire
- Coordinates: 48°02′15″N 0°52′02″E
- Country: France
- Region: Centre-Val de Loire
- Department: Loir-et-Cher
- Arrondissement: Vendôme
- Canton: Le Perche
- Intercommunality: Collines du Perche
- Area^{1}: 86.47 km^{2} (33.39 sq mi)
- Population (2023): 1,043
  - Density: 12.06/km^{2} (31.24/sq mi)
- Time zone: UTC+01:00 (CET)
  - Summer (DST): UTC+02:00 (CEST)
- INSEE/Postal code: 41248 /41170
- ^{1} French Land Register data, which excludes lakes, ponds, glaciers > 1 km^{2} (0.386 sq mi or 247 acres) and river estuaries.

Couëtron-au-Perche is a commune in the department of Loir-et-Cher, central France. The municipality was established on 1 January 2018 by merger of the former communes of Souday (the seat), Arville, Oigny, Saint-Agil and Saint-Avit.

== See also ==
- Communes of the Loir-et-Cher department
