= Petrus Andreas Gambari =

Italian Roman Catholic prelate

Most Reverend Petrus Andreas Gambari
- Bishop of Faenza
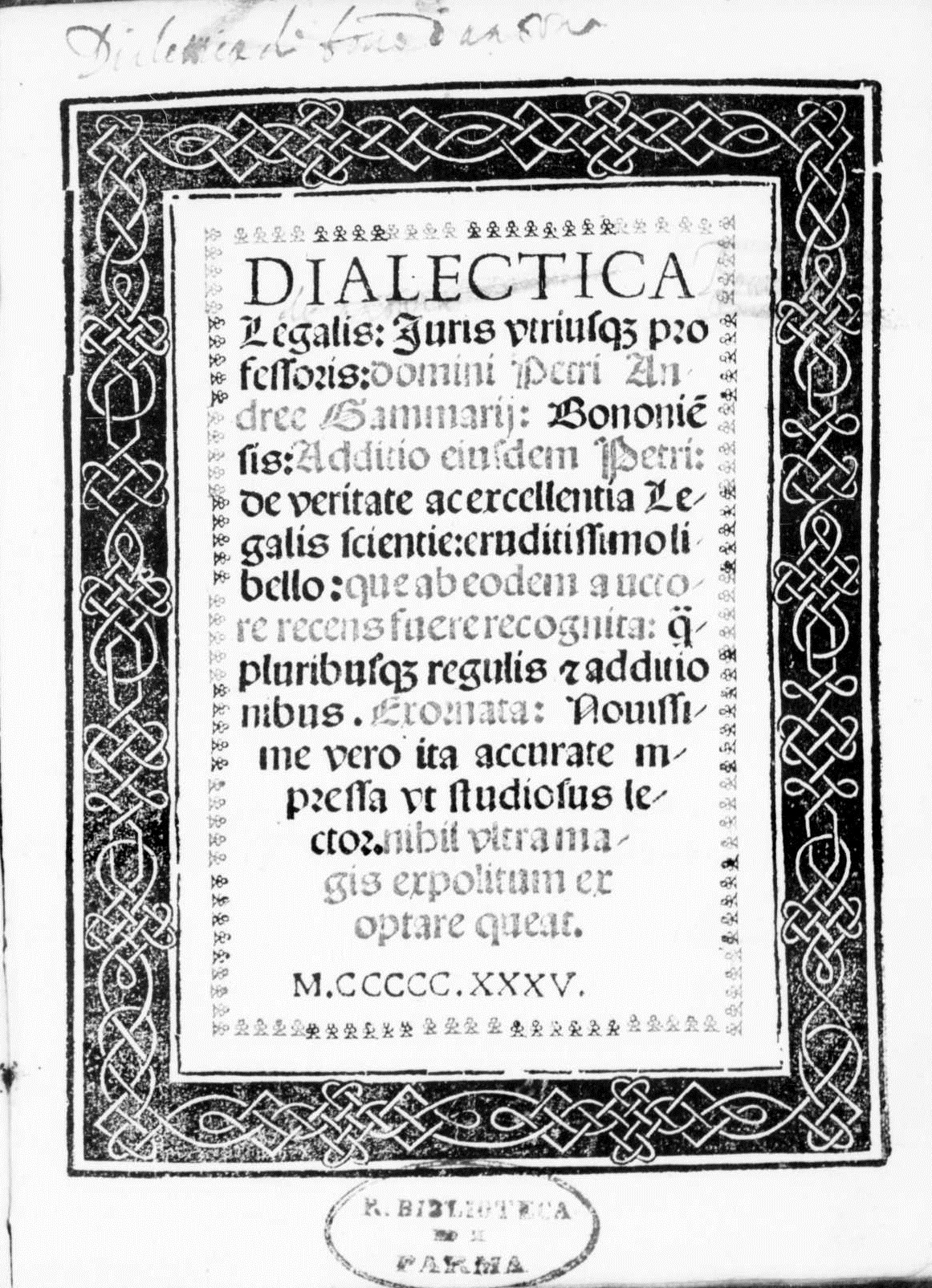
- Church: Catholic Church
- Diocese: Diocese of Faenza
- In office: 1528
- Predecessor: Giacomo Pasi
- Successor: Rodolfo Pio

Personal details
- Born: 1480
- Died: September 1528 (aged 47–48) Faenza, Italy

Petrus Andreas Gambari or Pier Andrea Gambari (1480–1528) was a Roman Catholic prelate who served as Bishop of Faenza (1528).

== Biography ==
On 7 Aug 1528, Petrus Andreas Gambari was appointed during the papacy of Pope Clement VII as Bishop of Faenza. He served as Bishop of Faenza only for a month until his death in Sep 1528.

== Works ==
- Dialectica legalis iuris utriusque (in Latin). Venezia: Guglielmo da Fontaneto. 1533.

== External links and additional sources ==
- Cheney, David M. "Diocese of Faenza-Modigliana". Catholic-Hierarchy.org. (for Chronology of Bishops) ^{[self-published]}
- Chow, Gabriel. "Diocese of Faenza-Modigliana (Italy)". GCatholic.org. (for Chronology of Bishops) ^{[self-published]}

Catholic Church titles
Preceded by Giacomo Pasi	Bishop of Faenza; 1528	Succeeded by Rodolfo Pio
