= Rodolfo Pio da Carpi =

16th-century Catholic cardinal

His Eminence Rodolfo Pio di Savoia
- Cardinal-Bishop
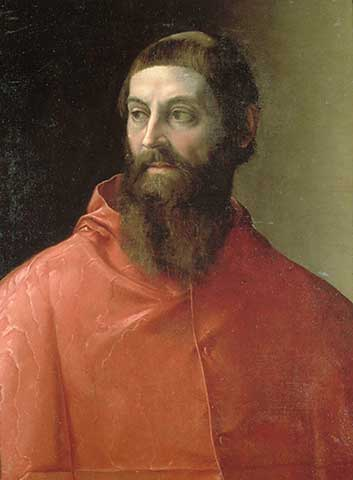
- Portrait by Francesco de' Rossi, c. 1549
- Diocese: Faenza (1528–1544); Albano (1553); Frascati (1553–1555); Porto (1555–1562); Ostia (1562–1564)

Orders
- Consecration: 28 December 1532 by Cardinal Bonifacio Ferrero
- Created cardinal: 22 December 1536 by Pope Paul III

Personal details
- Born: 22 February 1500 Carpi, Duchy of Modena and Reggio
- Died: 2 May 1564 (aged 64) Rome, Papal States
- Buried: Santissima Trinità dei Monti
- Parents: Lionello Pio da Carpi; Maria Martinengo
- Education: University of Padua, Ph.D.
- Coat of arms

Rodolfo Pio di Savoia (22 February 1500 – 2 May 1564), often referred to as Rodolfo Pio da Carpi, was an Italian cardinal, humanist and patron of the arts. The nephew of a diplomat, he himself became a diplomat by the age of thirty, and came to know both Emperor Charles V and King Francis of France, and he negotiated with both on behalf of the pope. His uncle, Alberto III Pio, was Pico della Mirandola's maternal nephew, had been educated by Aldus Manutius and had become a noted humanist scholar. These associations formed Rodolfo's background and education. He formed a notable library and participated in the humanist studies of 16th-century Rome; he also served on the Roman Inquisition. He helped to establish the Inquisition at Milan.

== Biography ==
=== Family ===
The lords of Carpi of the Pio di Savoia family first made a position for themselves in the 14th century. After having long contended for the city of Modena with the House of Este, in 1336 they eventually surrendered it, on condition that they retained the smaller domain of Carpi for themselves, with which they were later enfeoffed by the Holy Roman Empire. They maintained control of Carpi for nearly 200 years and in 1518 they were also invested by Pope Leo X, with the subsidiary papal fiefs of Meldola and Sarsina in the Romagna.

Many members of the family continued in the family tradition as condottieri: Alberto II Pio obtained from the house of Savoy in 1450, for himself, his brothers and their descendants, the privilege of adding the style "di Savoia" to their surname, as a reward for his military services. Others besides Cardinal Carpi made careers in diplomacy: his oncle Alberto III, who was Imperial ambassador in Rome won fame as a man of learning. Ascanio Pio (d. 1649) was a dramatic poet.

In the latter half of the 15th century, the family split into three different lines, which derived their names from three brothers who had peacefully shared the lordship for a long time. The Alberto branch (linea albertina), to which Cardinal Rodolfo belonged, maintained control of Carpi until 1525 and of Meldola and Sarsina until 1597, after which it became extinct in the male line. The Giberto branch (linea gibertina), which was ousted from Carpi in 1499, ruled the Este fiefdom of Sassuolo for almost all of the following century, until it was stripped by Cesare d'Este. The above-mentioned Ascanio and the two cardinals Carlo Emanuele and Carlo (Juniore) belonged to this branch, which was entitled to boast the principality of San Gregorio in the Papal State from 1655, following its purchase by the latter for his two half-brothers. The more important part of this branch settled in Spain at the end of the 17th century, reaching even the rank of Grandee, but its male line died out in 1776. The third branch, called the Galasso branch (linea galassina), was deprived of its sovereign rights over Carpi for alleged indignity in 1469, but stubbornly managed to survive in Carpi itself and is the only one that still thrives in Rome, in Great Britain and in the United States.

=== Education and early career ===
Rodolfo Pio di Savoia was born in Carpi near Modena, where his uncle Alberto III was joint Lord of Carpi. His father was Lionello II Pio and his mother was Maria daughter of Bernardino da Martinengo. In 1516 he was a Chevalier of the Knights of S. John of Jerusalem and Commendatory of the church of S. Lorenzo di Colorno in the diocese of Parma. Pope Leo X granted him the church of the Holy Trinity in Ferrara, clearly as a favor to his uncle rather than an acknowledgment of his own achievements. Rodolfo was sent to study at the University of Padua, where he became Doctor of Philosophy, and at Rome, where he took up an ecclesiastical career as a Papal Chamberlain under Pope Clement VII, who made him bishop of Faenza in 1528. There Carpi presided over a synod in 1533. He was absent, however, during most of the sixteen years of his episcopate, and therefore the duties of his office were performed by his brother Teodoro and by Segicellus of Faventia.

Carpi's first mission to France took place between 26 July and 28 November 1530. He was back in France as a special envoy in the summer of 1533, charged with arranging a personal meeting between Francis I and Pope Clement VII. He was received by Francis at Lyon on 11 June. The pope wanted to meet at Nice, but eventually the meeting took place in Marseille, where the marriage of Henry II and Catherine de' Medici was solemnized, and where Pope Clement was able to engage in negotiations with both Francis I and Charles V.

Carpi attracted further notice in papal diplomacy when he was established as papal nuncio at the court of Francis I (1535–1537). His commission was dated 9 January 1535; he joined the Court at Saint-Germain on 17 February. There he negotiated a peace between King Francis and the Emperor Charles V, who was pleased enough to appoint him "protector of the Holy Roman Empire". While Carpi was in France in 1533, there were rumors being spread around Rome, suggesting that Carpi was furnishing information to the Imperialists. Carpi was advised about these rumors by Pope Paul's secretary, Ambrogio Ricalcato, who also indicated that they were being circulated by agents of the Cardinal de Lorraine. Evidently King Francis heard about these rumors as well, since, in the middle of the night of 26 January 1536 he summoned Carpi to tell him that he deplored these rumors and considered Carpi a good servant. The king wrote to the pope, asking for a red hat for Carpi; the pope replied that it would be a subject for the next consistory for the creation of cardinals. Carpi also initiated discussions about having a general council of the Church to address the problems of heresy and church reform, though it became clear immediately that the king and the emperor had entirely different views as to how, and where, and what. He left France in July 1537, having already been appointed Cardinal.

=== Cardinalate ===
Pope Paul III created Rodolfo Pio da Carpi a cardinal in the Consistory of 22 December 1536, and on 23 July 1537 he was given his cardinal's ring and the titulus of Santa Pudenziana. He exchanged S. Pudenziana for Santa Prisca on 28 November 1537. On 19 December 1537 Cardinal Carpi was named Legatus a latere to King Francis I of France. He travelled to France in the company of Cardinal Cristoforo Jacobazzi, who had been named Legate to the Imperial Court in Spain. Both cardinals had a personal interview with King Francis at Montpellier in mid-January 1538. His purpose, and Jacobazzi's, was to bring together Francis I and Charles V in a meeting with Pope Paul III. The meeting duly took place in May, though at Nice rather than at Montpellier, but Cardinal Carpi did not attend. He had been sent to Rome, to act as the pope's prefect and Legate of the City in the pope's absence.

On 21 April 1539, Carpi was appointed Legate to the March of Ancona; he served until 1542. The province was in disarray, due to the repeated campaigns of the French and Imperialists. After restoring order, Carpi's most important work in that office was the revision of the Aegidian Constitutions, by which the March had been governed since 1357. Carpi's work, into which he drew the assistance of fourteen experts, was finally given approval and authorization by Pope Paul III in September 1544.

In 1543, Cardinal Carpi composed a Memorandum for the Emperor Charles V, entitled "Discorso del rev. card. di Carpi del 1543 a Carlo V Cesare del modo di dominare". The manuscript has never been published, but brief quotations have been published by Ludwig Pastor. The subject was the Duchy of Milan, which the Emperor Charles had taken from Francis I, and the content was advice on how to retain it. On no account should it be returned to Francis I.

Cardinal Carpi, as he now was, made his presence felt in the Roman Curia as a member of the Roman Inquisition and a defender of the new orders, the Capuchins and the Jesuits.

Cardinal Pio da Carpi became Cardinal Priest of San Clemente on 24 September 1543, which he exchanged for Santa Maria trans Tiberim on 17 October 1544.

In 1544 he was offered the See of Agrigentum (Girgenti) in Sicily by Charles V, and he was approved as Administrator of Girgenti by Pope Paul III on 10 October 1544. He held the post until his death. He never went to Girgenti, of course, since the appointment was only a financial benefit. In 1544, the Cardinal presided over the establishment of the Accademia degli Imperfetti in Meldola, the tiny lordship of which his uncle Alberto Pio da Carpi had been the first ruler. This academy for the encouragement of cultured persons; the stimulation of culture itself was another of those multitudinous clubs that were formed in cities and towns throughout Italy for the pursuit of intellectual growth.

=== Conclave of 1549–1550 ===
Pope Paul III died on Sunday, 10 November 1549. Cardinal Pio da Carpi was one of the fifty-one cardinals who participated at one point or another in the Conclave which began on 29 November 1549. There was much illness, coming and going, and one death in the Conclave. In the first Scrutiny, which did not take place until 4 December, at which forty-one cardinals were present, Cardinal Reginald Pole, the favorite candidate of the Emperor, received between 24 and 26 votes, only four (or two) votes short of a valid canonical election. The French Ambassador protested that if the election took place without the presence of the French cardinals, who were en route, he would declare the Election invalid. The French were promoting Giovanni Salviati (Bishop of Porto and cousin of Catherine de' Medici, Queen of France) and Ridolfo Pio de Carpi, and were commanded to prevent the election of Cardinal Pole at all costs. Cardinal Carpi received nine votes in the fourteenth Scrutiny on 17 December, just after the majority of the French cardinals had entered the Conclave. But it was his high water mark. The French votes quickly redeployed, seeking a more viable candidate. The last of the French cardinals, the Cardinal de Bourbon, did not reach the Conclave until 14 January 1550, thereby raising the number of participants to 48. The voting had fallen into a stagnant pattern, 21 votes for Pole, 21 votes for Carafa of Naples. Forty-seven cardinals participated in the final vote, which took place on 7 February 1550 and elected Cardinal Giovanni Maria Ciocchi del Monte, a member of the Farnese faction.

Pope Julius III (Ciocchi del Monte) promoted ('preferred') Cardinal Carpi to the See of Frascati (Tusculum) on 11 December 1553. Cardinal Carpi was 'preferred' to the See of Porto on 29 May 1555.

In 1558, King Philip II of Spain bestowed an annual income of 10,000 scudi upon the diocese of Agrigento (which had been worth only 4,000), which was still being held by Rodolfo Pio da Carpi as a gift from the Emperor Charles V. The new grant was for services rendered, no doubt, and in anticipation of future services on the part of a most influential Cardinal.

=== Conclave of 1559 ===
Pio da Carpi was the favorite candidate of King Philip II of Spain in the Conclave of 5 September–26 December 1559, which followed the death of Pope Paul IV, along with Jacopo Puteo (President of the Inquisition in Rome), Giovanni Angelo de' Medici (brother of the Marchese di Marignano), and Clemente D'Olera (former head of the Observant Franciscans). All of those candidates were rigorously orthodox, which was an essential criterion for Philip II's choice. It was said by the French Ambassador that Cardinals Carpi and Ricci were circulating a story in the Conclave to the effect that Cardinal de' Medici had Lutheran tendencies, and that he had said that it might be necessary to loosen the requirements on celibacy of the clergy and to allow the laity to receive both the bread and the wine in Holy Communion. Carpi had been the leader of the Imperial faction in the Conclave of 1555. The intractable resistance of the leader of the French faction, cardinal Ippolito d'Este, however, prevented his being considered a serious candidate for the papacy.

On 18 May 1562, Cardinal Rodolfo Pio da Carpi was promoted Bishop of Ostia and Dean of the College of Cardinals, succeeding François de Tournon who had died on 22 April 1562.

=== Artistic interests ===
Roman marble bas-relief in the gardens of the Villa Carpi, drawn by the French visitor Pierre Jacques, ca. 1576 (Bibliothèque Nationale)

Carpi's broader modern interest for historians centers on his collection of classical sculpture and other antiquities, which formed one of the prominent museums of Rome. Roma nihil possidet magnificentius, nihil admirabilius one guidebook remarked ("Rome possesses nothing more magnificent, nor to be more admired"). And his Greek and Latin library, dispersed after his death, brought scholars and humanists, not invariably good Catholics, to his palazzo in the Campo Marzio, the Campus Martius of Antiquity. Also his suburban villa was on the site of the gardens of Sallust, on the flank of the Quirinal Hill. In the 1550s the Flemish medallist and epigrapher Antoine Morillon studied the Latin inscriptions in the Cardinal's gallery. Even reading the dry inventories furnish materials for the historian of taste. The semi-public collections of princes and cardinals made Rome a museum-city, memorialized by Ulisse Aldrovandi's guidebook Delle Statue antiche che per tutta Roma si veggono, 1556 Aldrovandi praised the delights of the Carpi antiquities in their rustic suburban setting. Even after Cardinal Carpi's death, the collections drew sculptors and artists.

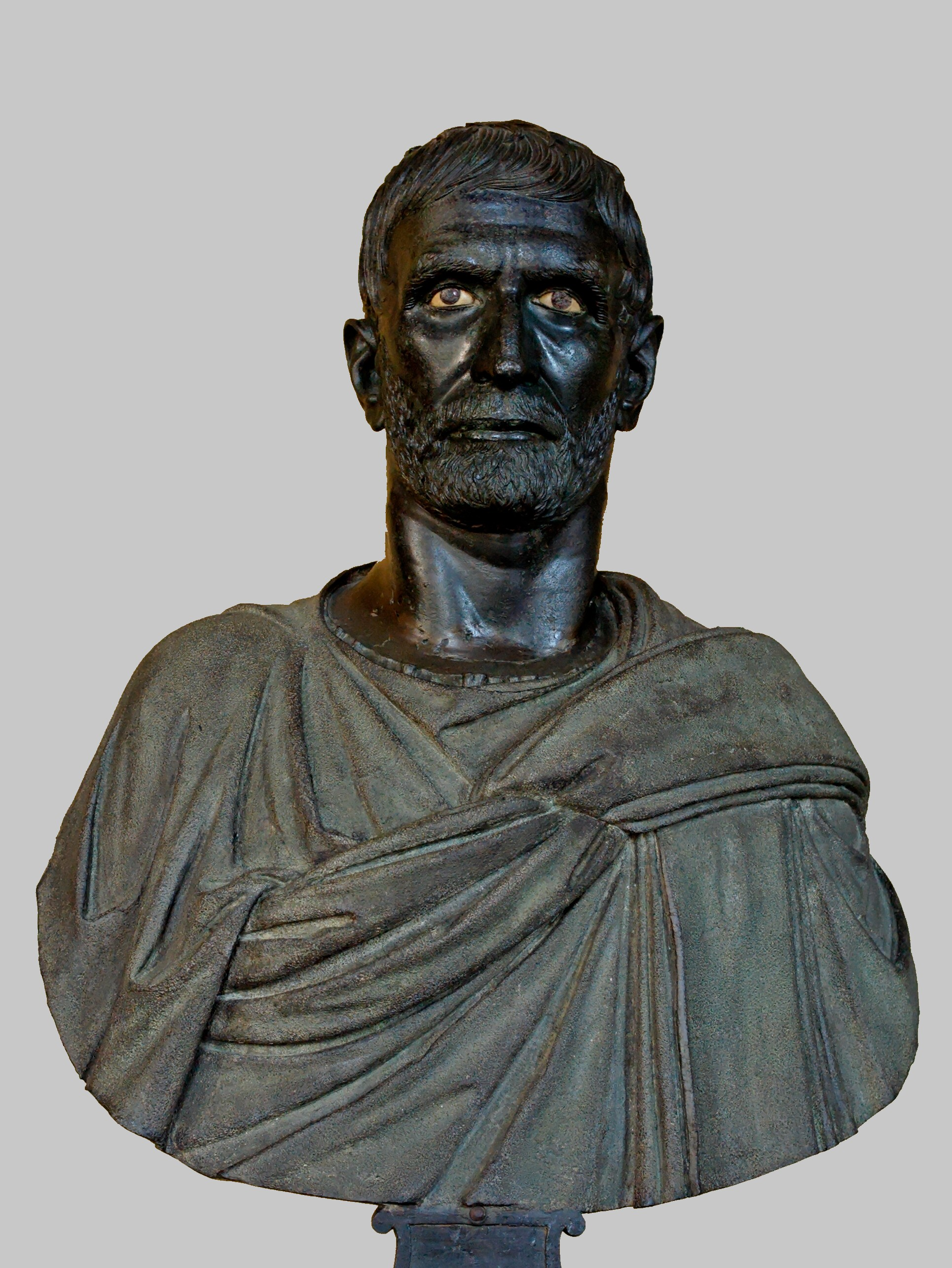
The so-called Capitoline Brutus, a bronze portrait head, glass-inlaid bone eyes, possibly late 4th to early 3rd centuries BC; bust is later

Among the antiquities that belonged to Cardinal Carpi:

- The bronze bust called the Capitoline Brutus that Pio da Carpi bequeathed to the City of Rome, now in the Capitoline Museums. (Haskell and Penny, cat. 14).
- The ecstatic marble head called the Dying Alexander, in the Uffizi Gallery, Florence by 1579; often copied in plaster, bronze and marble. (Haskell and Penny, cat. 2).
- Bronze and marbles bought from Duke Alfonso II d'Este some of which disappeared after they belonged to Rudolf II at Prague.
- A 5th-century manuscript of the complete works of Virgil, called the Medici Virgil after it was purchased for the Laurentian Library, Florence.

Cardinal Carpi did not neglect the moderns; among his paintings:

- Madonna of the Divine Love by Raphael, which Vasari said had been commissioned by the cardinal's father, Leonello da Carpi; it passed to the Farnese and is now at the Capodimonte Museum, Naples.
- History of the Madonna of Loreto and Saint Jerome in his study by Lorenzo Lotto.
- Portrait of a Man, originally attributed to Sebastiano del Piombo; now thought to be by Francesco Salviati, at the Kunsthistorisches Museum, Vienna.

=== Death ===
Cardinal Carpi died in Rome on 2 May 1564, in his 65th year, at the Palazzo Pallavicini in the Campo Marzio, where he had a lease for life. He had long suffered from gout (podagra), by which he was so tormented in the last four months of his life that he could not eat, speak or sleep without great pain. On his death he left a considerable debt, which was criticized by Pope Pius IV. He is interred in Rome at Santissima Trinità dei Monti, above the Spanish Steps, where there is a sepulchral monument erected to his memory by Pope Pius V in 1568.

Catholic Church titles
Preceded by Pier Andrea Gambari	Bishop of Faenza; 1528–1544	Succeeded by Teodoro Pio da Carpi
Preceded by Pietro Tagliavia d'Aragonia	Administrator of Agrigento; 1544–1564	Succeeded by Luigi Suppa
Preceded by Jean du Bellay	Cardinal-bishop of Albano; 1553	Succeeded by Juan Álvarez de Toledo
Preceded by Jean du Bellay	Cardinal-bishop of Frascati; 1553–1555	Succeeded by Juan Álvarez de Toledo
Preceded by Jean du Bellay	Cardinal-bishop of Porto; 1555–1562	Succeeded by Francesco Pisani
Preceded by François de Tournon	Cardinal-bishop of Ostia; 1562–1564	Succeeded by Francesco Pisani
