= Battista de' Canonici =

Roman Catholic prelate and academic

Most Reverend Battista de' Canonici
- Bishop of Faenza
- Church: Catholic Church
- Diocese: Diocese of Faenza
- In office: 1478–1510
- Successor: Giacomo Pasi

Personal details
- Died: 5 April 1510 Faenza, Italy

Battista de' Canonici (died 1510) was a professor of law at the University of Bologna, and Roman Catholic prelate who served as Bishop of Faenza (1478–1510).

== Biography ==
Battista di Francesco de' Canonici was a native of Bologna.

He was ordained a priest, time and circumstances unknown. It is said he was a member of the Order of Saint Benedict.

From 1464 to 1467 he was professor of Canon Law at the University of Bologna. He became a Canon and Prebend of the Cathedral Chapter of S. Petronio in Bologna, a post he held for eight years. In 1472 he was also named Canon of the Collegiate Church of S. Pietro. He was also Abbot commendatory of santi Nabore e Felice outside the walls of Bologna. On 26 February 1501, Bishop Battista signed a grant which he issued from his residence at Ss. Nabore e Felice, indicating that he was still the Abbot Commendatory.

On 5 Oct 1478, he was appointed by Pope Sixtus IV as Bishop of Faenza. He was the first bishop of Faenza of Bolognese origin. His predecessor was the last bishop of Faenza to be elected by the Cathedral Chapter. He served as Bishop of Faenza until his death. While bishop, he was the principal co-consecrator of Nicolò Maria d'Este, Bishop of Adria (1487).

He drew up and registered his Last Will and Testament on 28 March 1510. He did not die on 5 Apr 1510, as alleged by Strozzi. A document survives dated 1 April 1510, which refers to Bishop Battista as already deceased.

== Sources ==
- Azzurrini, Bernardino (1905). Antonio Messeri (ed.). Chronica breviora aliaque monumenta Faventina a Bernardino Azzurrinio collecta. Rerum Italicarum Scriptores, XXVIII, parte iii (in Latin and Italian). Tipi della casa editrice S. Lapi.
- Strocchi, Andrea (1841). Serie cronologica storico-critica de' vescovi faentini (in Italian). Faenza: Montanari e Marabini. pp. 184–186. [highly inaccurate]

Catholic Church titles
Preceded by	Bishop of Faenza; 1478–1510	Succeeded by Giacomo Pasi
