= Giacomo Pasi =

Roman Catholic bishop

Most Reverend Giacomo Pasi
- Bishop of Faenza
- Church: Catholic Church
- Diocese: Diocese of Faenza
- In office: 1510–1528
- Predecessor: Battista de' Canonici
- Successor: Petrus Andreas Gambari

Personal details
- Died: 19 July 1528 Faenza, Italy

Giacomo Pasi (died 1528) was a Roman Catholic prelate who served as Bishop of Faenza (1510–1528).

== Biography ==
On 8 April, 1510, Giacomo Pasi was appointed during the papacy of Pope Julius II as Bishop of Faenza. He served as Bishop of Faenza until his death on 19 July, 1528.

== External links and additional sources ==
- Cheney, David M. "Diocese of Faenza-Modigliana". Catholic-Hierarchy.org. (for Chronology of Bishops) ^{[self-published]}
- Chow, Gabriel. "Diocese of Faenza-Modigliana (Italy)". GCatholic.org. (for Chronology of Bishops) ^{[self-published]}

Catholic Church titles
Preceded by Battista de' Canonici	Bishop of Faenza; 1510–1528	Succeeded by Petrus Andreas Gambari
