= Geoffrey IV, Viscount of Châteaudun =

Geoffrey IV (Geoffroy IV) (died 1176), Viscount of Châteaudun, son of Hugh V, Viscount of Châteaudun, and Marguerite de Saint-Calais, daughter of Sylvestre de Saint-Calais.

It is not clear that Geoffrey was ever Viscount of Châteaudun, but some histories list him as such. The only record of him is various charters confirming donations to churches in the area. One intriguing reference is to his consent to freeing of the men of the church of Notre-Dame-de-Mondoubleau, which, according to Beauvais de Saint-Paul, released the servants of the parish from their bondage.

It is not known whether Geoffrey married or had issue.
