= Oigny, Loir-et-Cher =

Oigny
- Part of Couëtron-au-Perche
- Coat of arms
- Location of Oigny
- Location within France Location within Centre-Val de Loire
- Coordinates: 48°03′51″N 0°55′18″E
- Country: France
- Region: Centre-Val de Loire
- Department: Loir-et-Cher
- Arrondissement: Vendôme
- Canton: Le Perche
- Commune: Couëtron-au-Perche
- Area^{1}: 9.86 km^{2} (3.81 sq mi)
- Elevation: 170 m (560 ft)
- Highest elevation: 184 m (604 ft)
- Lowest elevation: 134 m (440 ft)
- Population (2023): 89
  - Density: 9.0/km^{2} (23/sq mi)
- Time zone: UTC+01:00 (CET)
  - Summer (DST): UTC+02:00 (CEST)
- Postal code: 41170
- ^{1} French Land Register data, which excludes lakes, ponds, glaciers > 1 km^{2} (0.386 sq mi or 247 acres) and river estuaries.

Oigny (French pronunciation: [waɲi]) is a former commune in the Loir-et-Cher department of central France. On 1 January 2018, it was merged into the new commune of Couëtron-au-Perche.

== See also ==
- Communes of the Loir-et-Cher department
