= Saint-Avit-Saint-Nazaire =

- Commune
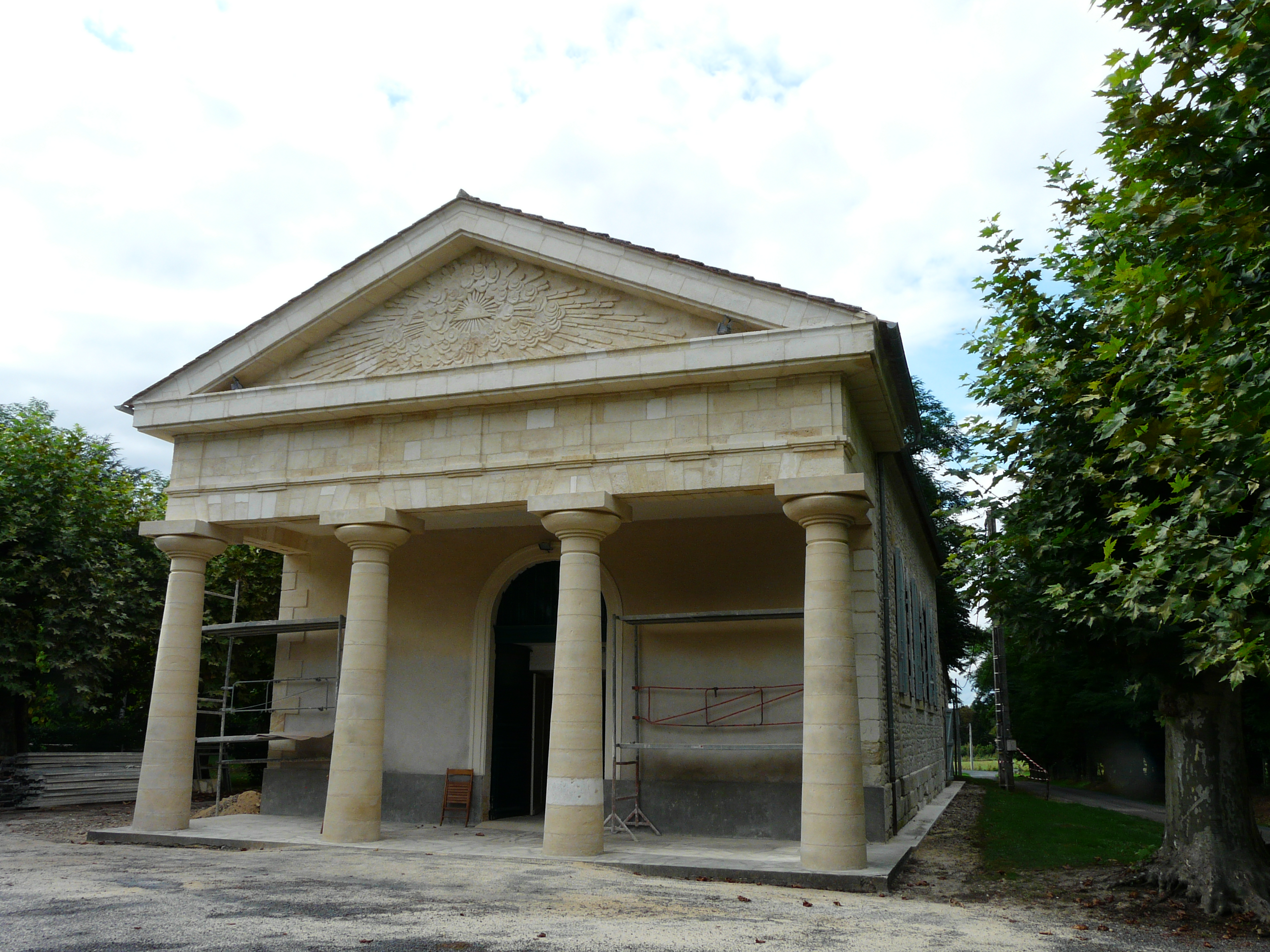
- Protestant church
- Location of Saint-Avit-Saint-Nazaire
- Location within France Location within Nouvelle-Aquitaine
- Coordinates: 44°51′05″N 0°15′30″E
- Country: France
- Region: Nouvelle-Aquitaine
- Department: Gironde
- Arrondissement: Libourne
- Canton: Le Réolais et Les Bastides
- Intercommunality: Pays Foyen

Government
  - Mayor (2020–2026): Laurent Fritsch
- Area^{1}: 18.61 km^{2} (7.19 sq mi)
- Elevation: 27 m (89 ft)
- Highest elevation: 38 m (125 ft)
- Lowest elevation: 6 m (20 ft)
- Population (2023): 1,503
  - Density: 80.76/km^{2} (209.2/sq mi)
- Time zone: UTC+01:00 (CET)
  - Summer (DST): UTC+02:00 (CEST)
- INSEE/Postal code: 33378 /33220
- ^{1} French Land Register data, which excludes lakes, ponds, glaciers > 1 km^{2} (0.386 sq mi or 247 acres) and river estuaries.

Saint-Avit-Saint-Nazaire (French: [sɛ̃t‿avi sɛ̃ nazɛːʁ]; Occitan: Sent Avit e Sent Nazari) is a commune in the Gironde department in Nouvelle-Aquitaine in southwestern France.

== Population ==
Historical population
Year	Pop.	±% p.a.
1968	1,002	—
1975	1,015	+0.18%
1982	1,203	+2.46%
1990	1,278	+0.76%
1999	1,381	+0.86%
2007	1,472	+0.80%
2012	1,488	+0.22%
2017	1,469	−0.26%
2023	1,503	+0.38%
Source: INSEE

== See also ==
- Communes of the Gironde department
