= Souday =

- Part of Couëtron-au-Perche
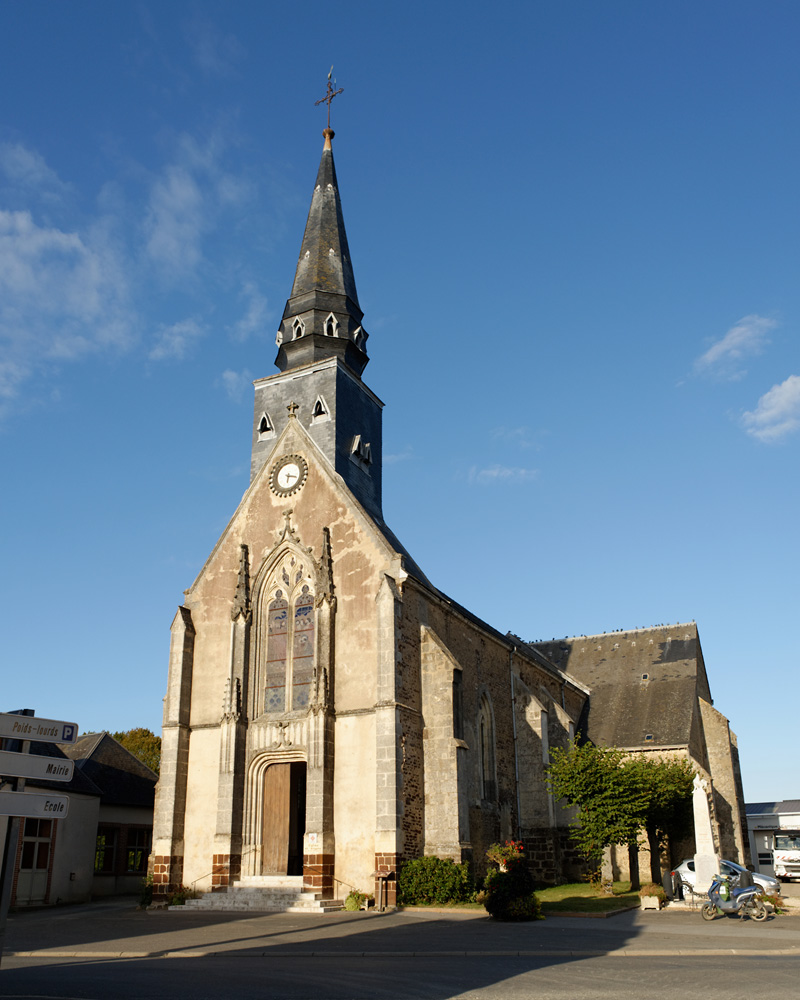
- The church of Saint-Pierre, in Souday

- Coat of arms
- Location of Souday
- Location within France Location within Centre-Val de Loire
- Coordinates: 48°02′15″N 0°52′02″E
- Country: France
- Region: Centre-Val de Loire
- Department: Loir-et-Cher
- Arrondissement: Vendôme
- Canton: Le Perche
- Commune: Couëtron-au-Perche
- Area^{1}: 36.42 km^{2} (14.06 sq mi)
- Elevation: 165 m (541 ft)
- Highest elevation: 182 m (597 ft)
- Lowest elevation: 106 m (348 ft)
- Population (2022): 492
  - Density: 13.5/km^{2} (35.0/sq mi)
- Time zone: UTC+01:00 (CET)
  - Summer (DST): UTC+02:00 (CEST)
- Postal code: 41170
- ^{1} French Land Register data, which excludes lakes, ponds, glaciers > 1 km^{2} (0.386 sq mi or 247 acres) and river estuaries.

Souday (French pronunciation: [sudɛ]) is a former commune in the Loir-et-Cher department in central France. On 1 January 2018, it was merged into the new commune of Couëtron-au-Perche.

Souday is situated 84 kilometres south west of Paris, near Vendôme. At 165 metres altitude, the village of Souday is built on a chalk plateau which is overlain by a sandy flint clay supporting profitable mixed agriculture. The average rainfall is 800 mm annually, with temperatures ranging from -18 to +42 degrees C.

Extensive deciduous forest, pastures and roadside verges support a wide range of flora and fauna including wild pigs and deer. Spring is heralded by carpets of wild snowdrops followed in quick succession by bluebells, cowslips and wild orchids in the wooded valleys of the rivers Braye, Couetron and Grenne.

The earliest houses in the village are timber framed, followed by flint construction and later with locally made bricks. The church of St Pierre dates back to the 9th century and the two chateaux outside the village date from the 15th and 19th centuries.

The population was 563 at the last census, 465 of whom are over 18 years of age. The small village primary school accommodates 75 children, some of whom come by bus from outlying villages and farms.

Facilities in the village include a restaurant, petrol station and bar, a main dealer garage, unisex hairdresser, grocery shop/post office, bakers and butchers. There is a campsite for tents and caravans with a shower block and electricity points. Outdoor activities include fishing, good walking on marked routes and cycling on quiet roads. There is a pony club, several football teams serving all ages, a village band and a hunting club.

== See also ==
- Braye (river)
- Communes of the Loir-et-Cher department
