= Arville, Loir-et-Cher =

Arville
- Part of Couëtron-au-Perche
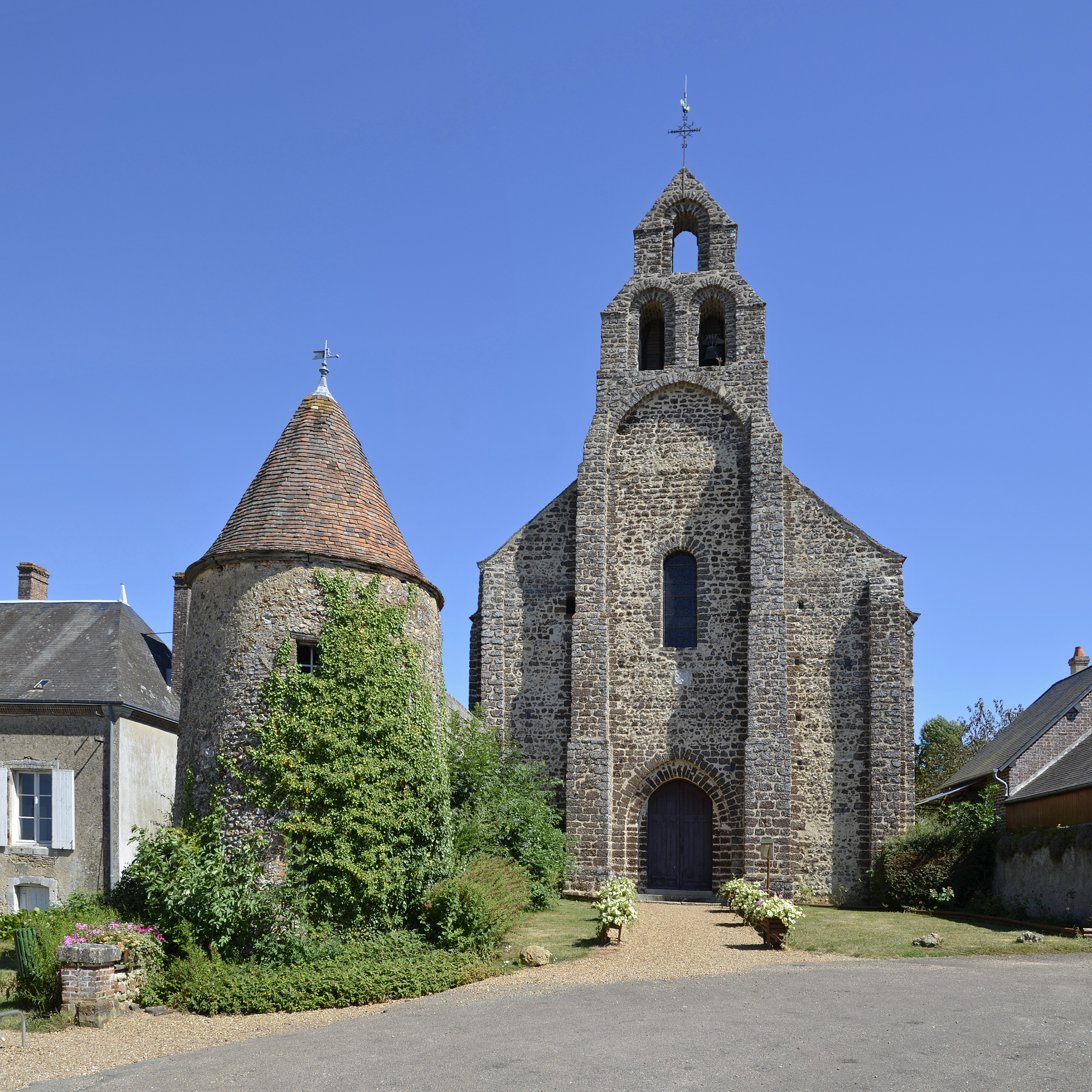
- Church of Our Lady

- Coat of arms
- Location of Arville
- Location within France Location within Centre-Val de Loire
- Coordinates: 48°03′49″N 0°56′53″E
- Country: France
- Region: Centre-Val de Loire
- Department: Loir-et-Cher
- Arrondissement: Vendôme
- Canton: Le Perche
- Commune: Couëtron-au-Perche
- Area^{1}: 9.75 km^{2} (3.76 sq mi)
- Highest elevation: 204 m (669 ft)
- Lowest elevation: 157 m (515 ft)
- Population (2023): 93
  - Density: 9.5/km^{2} (25/sq mi)
- Time zone: UTC+01:00 (CET)
  - Summer (DST): UTC+02:00 (CEST)
- Postal code: 41170
- ^{1} French Land Register data, which excludes lakes, ponds, glaciers > 1 km^{2} (0.386 sq mi or 247 acres) and river estuaries.

Arville is a former commune in the Loir-et-Cher department in central France. On 1 January 2018, it was merged into the new commune of Couëtron-au-Perche.

== Sights ==
Arville's 12th-Century commandry now hosts a museum on the Crusades and the Knights Templar.

== See also ==
- Communes of the Loir-et-Cher department
