= Sandleford Priory (monastery) =

Former priory of canons regular (ca. 1200-1478)

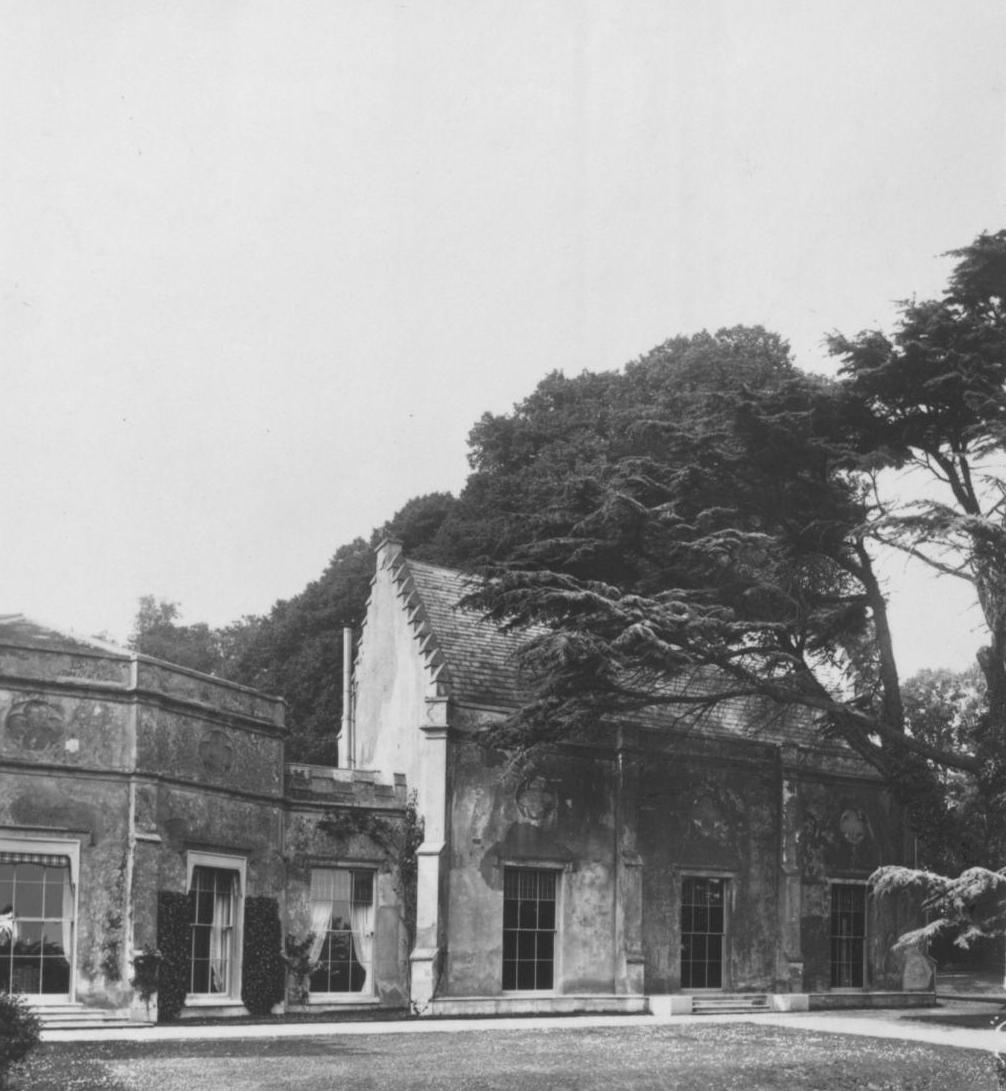
1906 Photograph of the old monastery chapel incorporated into the 18th century Sandleford Priory

Sandleford Priory was a small Augustinian Priory, the remains of which now stand at Sandleford in the civil parish of Greenham in the English county of Berkshire.

== History ==
Archbishop (and Cardinal) Stephen (Langton) (c.1150–1228) (Archbishop of Canterbury, 1207–1228), in its confirmation charter stated that the house was dedicated to the honour of St. John Baptist (and the Blessed Virgin Mary and all the Saints). The original seals on the charter featured those of the Archbishop of Canterbury Hubert Walter, the Bishop of Sarum Herbert le Poer (Poore), William of Perche (died 1226) bishop of Châlons, and Stephen of Perche (killed in 1205);

The Priory of St John the Baptist at Sandleford was founded for the Augustinian Canons Regular by Geoffrey, Earl of Perch and his wife Maud some time between 1193 and 1202.

In 1274, Maud de Clare, Countess of Gloucester and Hertford made arrangements to refound it as a double house for Fontevrault Benedictine nuns and brothers, but this did not come about. It was dissolved in 1478 and abandoned by the remaining monks after years of mismanagement by a prior. The ownership fell into the hands of the Bishop of Salisbury, and circa 1480 passed to the Dean and Chapter of Windsor. The old priory chapel is the present library. The remains were converted to a country house.

On 31 August 1320, King Edward II was at Sandleford Priory, where he apparently tarried for the night.

One of the last of the priors was a man named Simon Dam who was dismissed after he was caught with his mistress, Thomasina, at the Priory in 1440.

The number of canons at the priory eventually dwindled until at the death of the last prior in 1478 when there were none left.

== Priors ==
- Walter, occurs (presented or elected) July 1222;
- John, occurs circa 1230-1240;
- Gervase, occurs 1255;
- Stephen, occurs 1256-1262;
- Robert de Winchester (Wynton or Winton), elected or there 1301;
- Thomas de Sandleford, occurs 1311, 1330;
- William de Wynton (Winchester), resigned 1334;
- Robert [Gilbert], 1334, and occurs 27 January 1336/7;
- John, occurs 2 February 1354/55;
- John, occurs 11 February 1383/84;
- Richard Stanford, elected 1403;
- Hugh Warham, elected 1406, a kinsman of William Warham (c.1450–1532);
- Symon Dam, deposed 1439/1440;
- William Costyn, elected 1448, formerly a canon of Bisham Abbey;
- William Westbury, occurs 1457. First headmaster of Eton College 1442–1447, and then its fourth Provost 1447–1477. Provost Westbury saved Eton from amalgamation with St. George's Chapel, Windsor.

== Patrons ==
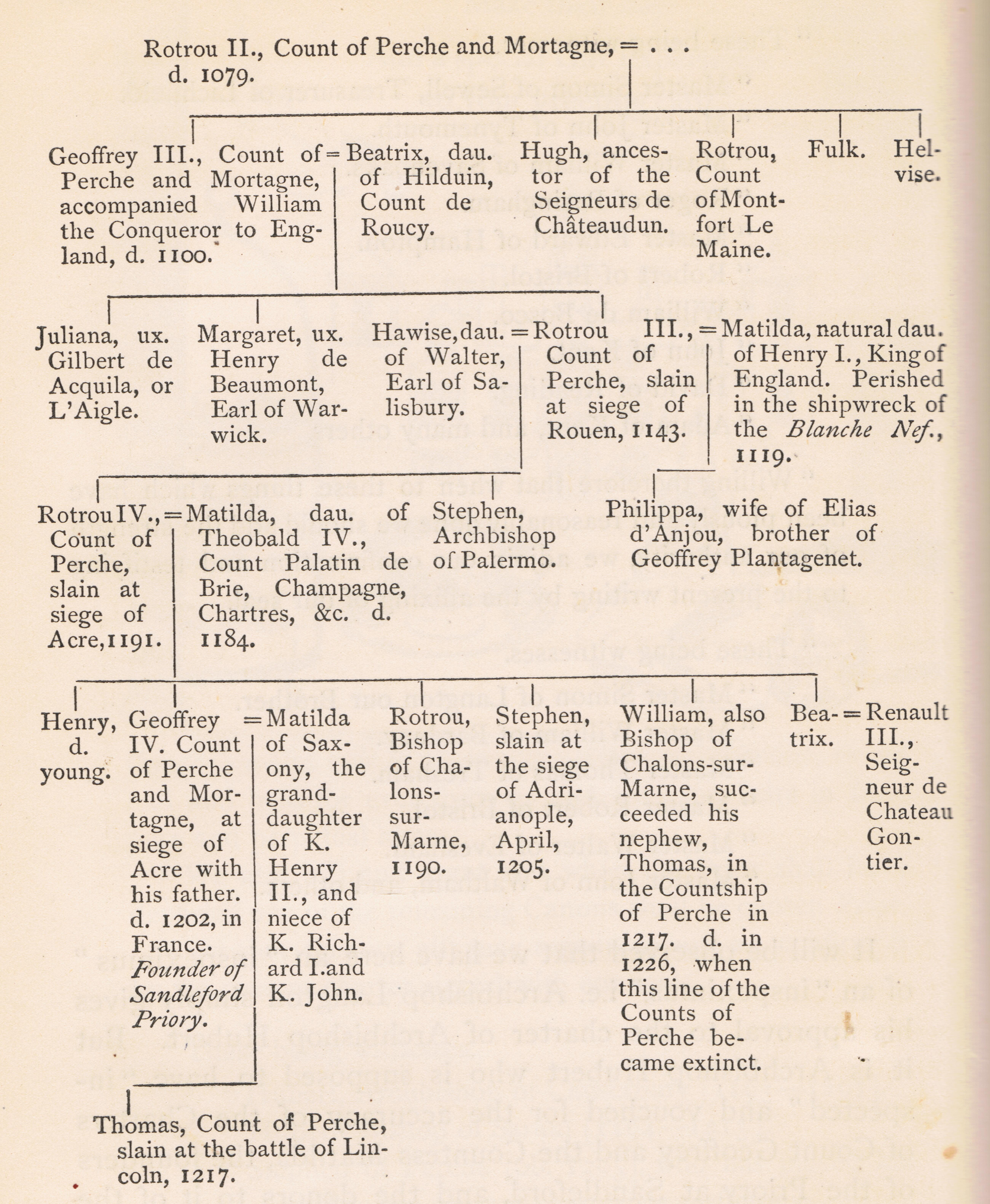
Family tree of Rotrou de Perche.

Family tree, Ernulf de Hesdin to Geoffrey de Perche.

Shield of Perche. An heraldic device similar to that used by the De Clare family.

- Anglo-French magnate and veteran of the Third Crusade Geoffrey (died 1202, buried St. Denis, Nogent-le-Rotrou), Earl of Perche and Mortagne, of the House of Châteaudun, Lord of the manor of Newbury, and his wife (they married in 1189) Richenza-Matilda of Saxony, daughter of Henry the Lion, duke of Bavaria and duke of Saxony, (died 1195) by Matilda (or Maud) of England (died 1189). Matilda, countess de Perche, was thus a legitimate granddaughter of King Henry II (died 1189) and Eleanor of Aquitane (died 1204), a great-granddaughter of Empress Matilda (died 1167), great-great grand daughter of Matilda of Scotland (died 1118), and was niece of both King Richard the Lionheart (died 1199) and Bad King John (died 1216), and of Queen Eleanor of Castille (died 1214). The Holy Roman Emperor Otto IV was one of Matilda's brothers. In 1204, two years after count Geoffrey's death, Richenza-Matilda married Enguerrand III, Lord of Coucy (c.1182–1242), Enguerrand le Grand, of Picardy.

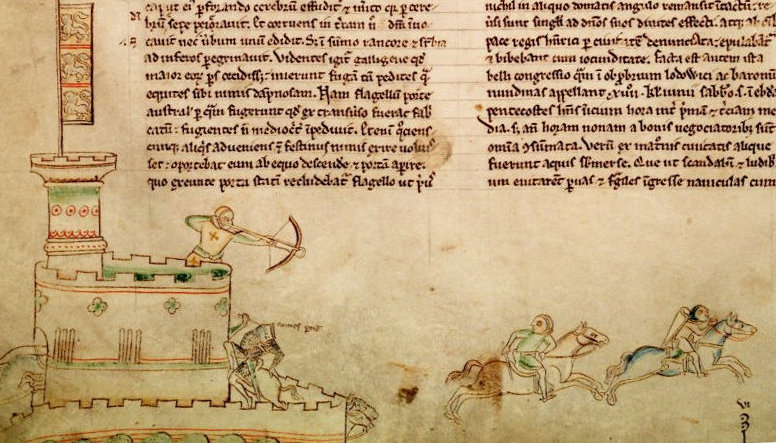
_{A 13th-century depiction of the Second Battle of Lincoln, which occurred at Lincoln Castle on 20 May 1217 during the First Barons' War between the forces of the future Louis VIII of France and those of King Henry III of England. Louis' forces were attacked by a relief force under the command of William Marshal, 1st Earl of Pembroke. Thomas du Perche, the Comte de la Perche, who was commanding the French troops, was killed; the illustration depicts his death. Perche had come to England to try and recover the honour of Perche which had been lost in 1204 by his mother (a niece of John, King of England) – this included Newbury and Shrivenham in Berkshire, Toddington in Buckinghamshire, and Haughley in Suffolk. This heavy defeat led to Louis being expelled from his base in the southeast of England.}

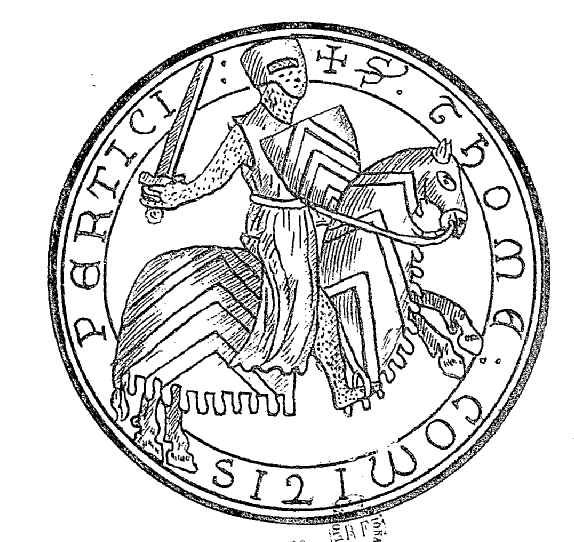
Thomas du Perche, son and heir of Geoffrey & Matilda, killed 1217.

Matilda and Geoffrey III, fourth Count of Perche, founded Sandleford Priory between 1193 and 1200. In addition to the freehold of the site and 600 or so acres, all the lands at Sandleford, as it is bound by hedges and ditches, with all its appurtenances, an annuity of 13 marks from the mills of Newbury was allocated for the support of the house.
Geoffrey's grandfather the great Rotrou III, Count of Perche (1084-killed 1143/44) married (1136) Hawise (Harwise or Hedwig) d'Evereux (1118–1152), daughter of Walter (d'Evereux) of Salisbury by Sibyl de Chaworth (de Chaources, alias Mundublel, alias de Cadurcis). Sibyl's parents who married in 1118 were Maud/Matilda de Hesdin and Patrick de Chaources. Sibyl was thus a granddaughter of the modern era founder of Newbury the Lord of Ulvritone, Ernulf de Hesdin (died Antioch, 1097). Hawise was an elder sister of Patrick of Salisbury, 1st Earl of Salisbury (c. 1122 – 1168) and of Sibyl Marshal.
Hawise and Rotrou III's son, Count Geoffrey's father, Rotrou IV, count of Perche and Mortagne, was slain during the Third Crusade at the Siege of Acre, having married Matilda (died 1184) daughter of Theobald IV.
Hawise's younger sister Sibyl (1120-) married John Marshal, and their sons John the Marshall, William Marshal, 1st Earl of Pembroke and Henry Marshall (bishop of Exeter) (died 1206) were thus Geoffrey's first cousins-once-removed. After Count Thomas Perche's death, at the Battle of Lincoln leading the forces of the Capetain Prince Louis against King John and his noble cousin William Marshal, 1st Earl of Pembroke (died 1219) in 1217, his noble kinswoman, a second cousin once removed, Ella or Ela of Salisbury, 3rd Countess of Salisbury, daughter of William of Salisbury, 2nd Earl of Salisbury, and wife of William Longespée (Longspey), 3rd Earl of Salisbury claimed some of his property, including Newbury. William Longspey, Lord Salisbury, was uncle of Henry III.
The connection of John le Marshal (died 1194) and his younger brother William Marshal, 1st Earl of Pembroke (died 1219), of Newbury Castle, Hamstead Marshall to Sandleford also shown by the former's mistress Alice de Colville (died before 1220?) of Maidencourt, East Garston giving six-quarters of wheat (28 pounds x 6 = 168 pounds = 12 stone) from Maidencourt to the Priory of Sandleford for praying for their souls.

- Geoffrey's uncle Stephen du Perche (1137/8–1169), had been Archbishop of Palermo, and his brother Stephen was killed at siege and Battle of Adrianople in 1205, while two other brothers, Rotrou (bishop 1190–1200) and William (died 1226), were both sometime bishops of Châlons.

In 1195 Geoffrey was described by the chronicler as a man whose soul was naturally grand and magnanimous [whose] sole happiness was to consecrate his fortune in fostering religion and relieving suffering humanity [in conjunction with] his noble and pious wife Matilda.

- Despite the royal status of the widow Countess Matilda, her uncle King John, around 1204, soon after death of the Count Geoffrey Rotrou of Perche in 1202 (Geoffrey had he not died would have taken part in the Fourth Crusade,) started to repossess and reassign the lands of the Perche in England. Dr. Kathleen Thompson says (2013): However, the king went to some lengths to preserve the Rotrou family association with the lands. He guaranteed two pensions which Count Geoffrey had granted from the revenues of Newbury, ordering that Simon of Pattishall was to be reimbursed for their continued payment, and instructed Simon to honour Count Geoffrey's grant of a rent from the mill at Newbury to the canons of Sandleford.

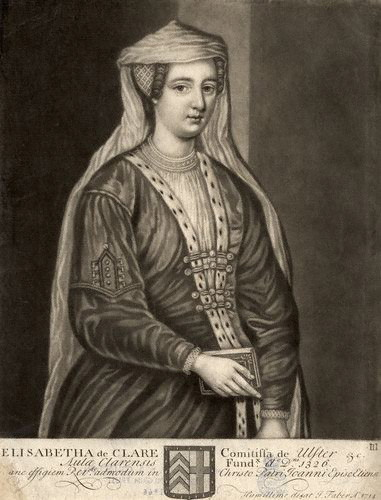
Eliz. de Clare, Lady de Burgh, by John Faber the Elder, after Unknown artist, mezzotint, 1714.

- Alice de Colville (died before 1220?) of Maidencourt, East Garston. Gave six-quarters of wheat (28 pounds x 6 = 168 pounds = 12 stone) from Maidencourt to the Priory of Sandleford for praying for the souls of John le Marshal (died 1194) and his younger brother William Marshal, 1st Earl of Pembroke, of Newbury Castle, Hamstead Marshall, etc.
- Maud de Clare, (1223–1289), was daughter of John de Lacy, 2nd Earl of Lincoln, and the wife of Richard de Clare, 5th Earl of Hertford, 6th Earl of Gloucester, conceived at Sandleford, with help of a Papal mandate dated 1274, an Augustinian convent for 40 nuns and for 10 priests of the order of Fontevraud Abbey; Her husband was a grandson of William Marshal, 1st Earl of Pembroke. Her granddaughter, Elizabeth de Clare, founded Clare College, Cambridge in 1338.
- Between 1217 and 1223, a grant of money was made by Edelina de Broch (d.1220), widow, to the Canons of the Church of Saint John the Baptist, Sandleford of 40s. and 8d. from her inheritance in Frollebire [Frobury] for the maintenance of a Canon Chantry Priest, for the souls of herself, her father, Randulf de Broch [Broc] (died 1179 or 1187), and Damietta de Gorron (d.1204), the lady of Chetton, Eudon and Berwick (co. Salop), her mother, who brought lands at Frollebury (Frobury, Kingsclere) in Hampshire, and Stephen de Turneham (d.1214), her husband. Such money to be received from Henry de Wudecote, Walter de Clera, Hugh de Swantun, Joceus de Brikeull, William Furmentin of Spenes, Symon Cath, Wulfric de Marisco, Nicholas de Wullavintun, John Trull. Witnesses: Peter [de Rupibus], Bishop of Winchester, William Prior of Syreburn [Sherbourne], Dan Roger de Leburna, William de Stanes and William de Sorewull, Sheriff of the County of Southampton, Henry de Wudecott, Henry de Fernlehd, Thomas Croc, Roger Lanceleue, John de Hamtun, John de Wultun, Walter de Clera, William de Edmundesdrop, William Toli seneschel of the donor, Master Walter de Syreburne, Robert Fitzbernard of Hamtun, Richard, Clerk of Clera, Henry Blakemy, Wlater Clerk of the donor, Hugh de Swantun, Master Walter, Joceus de Brikeull, Bartholomew Crok, Richard Fitzruald, John his brother, Thomas the clerk.
  - This was confirmed by her daughter Beatrice de Fay (died before 1245), widow of Ralph de Fay, (she married secondly Hugh de Neville (died 1234) was the Chief Forester under the kings Richard I, John, and Henry III of England), to the Church of Saint John the Baptist, Sandleford, and the Canons, of rents etc, in Frollebire [Frobury], which Edelina de Broc, her mother gave them. Witnesses: William Prior of Sireburn [Sherbourne], Henry de Wodecot, Thomas Croc, Wlater de Clera, William de Edmundesthrop, John de Wltun, Richard de Quercu, John Lanceleuee, Bartholomew Croc, Richard Serviens, Auger Nepos of donor, John de Wodecot, Stephen de Hamtun. Her third husband Hugh de Plessetis (de Playz) had Beatrice excommunicated circa 1241 because she would not divorce him.
- Grant [1216–1272] of corn by Thomas Croc [Croch] [dead by 1230] to the Canons of the Church of Saint John the Baptist, Sandelford [Sandleford] of three-quarters de meliori frumento [the better corn] annually in his town and manor of Estun [Crux Easton]. Witnesses: Sir Henry de Wodecote [ Woodcott ], John Lanceleuee, Robert Lord de Vrleston, William de Edmundestrop, Richard de Quercu, Bartholomew Croc, Vrlestun, son of Ranuld de Vndecote and Richard Croc.

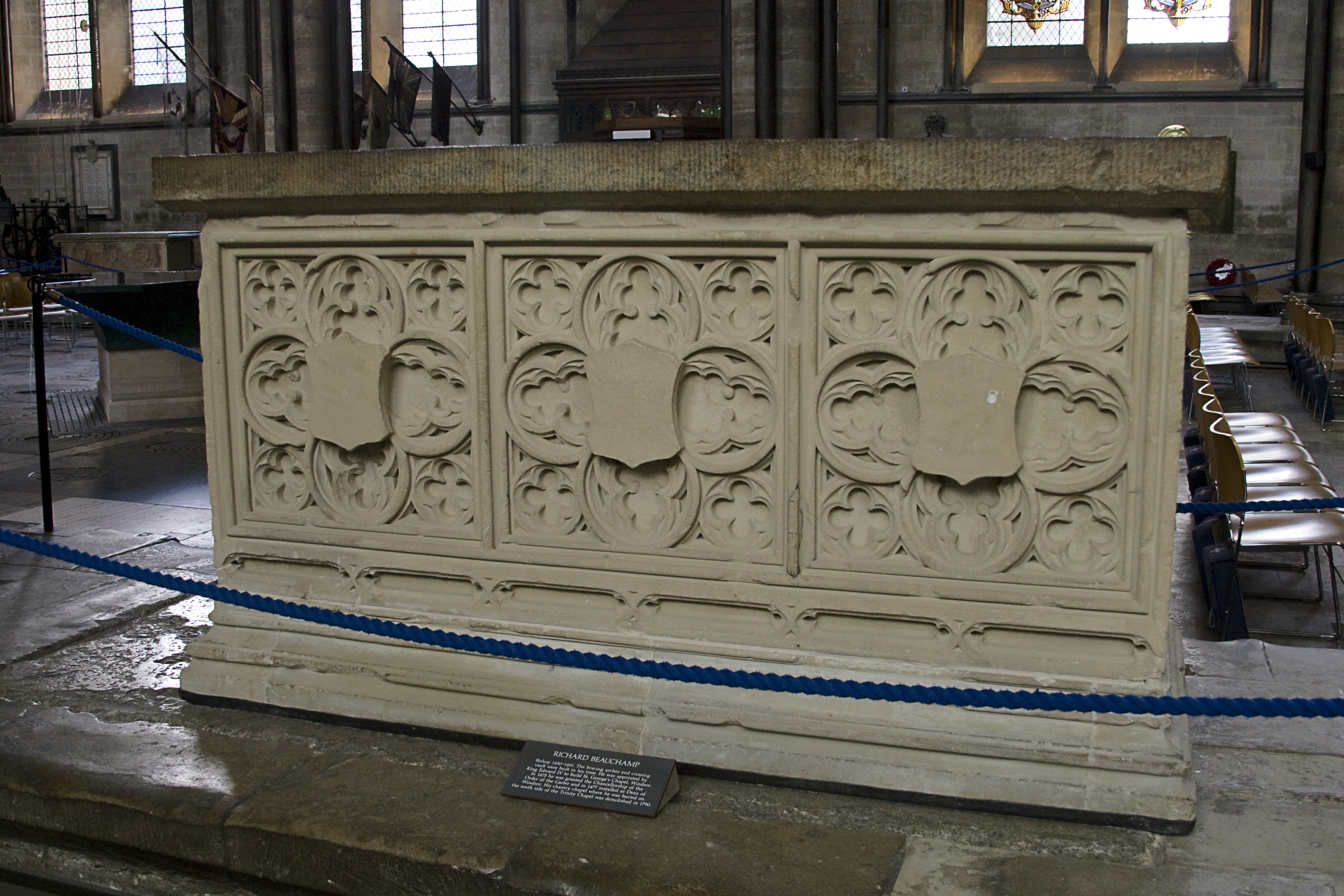
Tomb of Richard Beauchamp.

- Richard Beauchamp (died 1481), Bishop of Salisbury (1450–1481) and Dean of Windsor (1478–81), first Chancellor of the Order of the Garter. He gave, in co-ordination with Kind Edward IV, the by then abandoned, in religious terms, priory to the Dean and Canons of Windsor, on 9 March 1478;

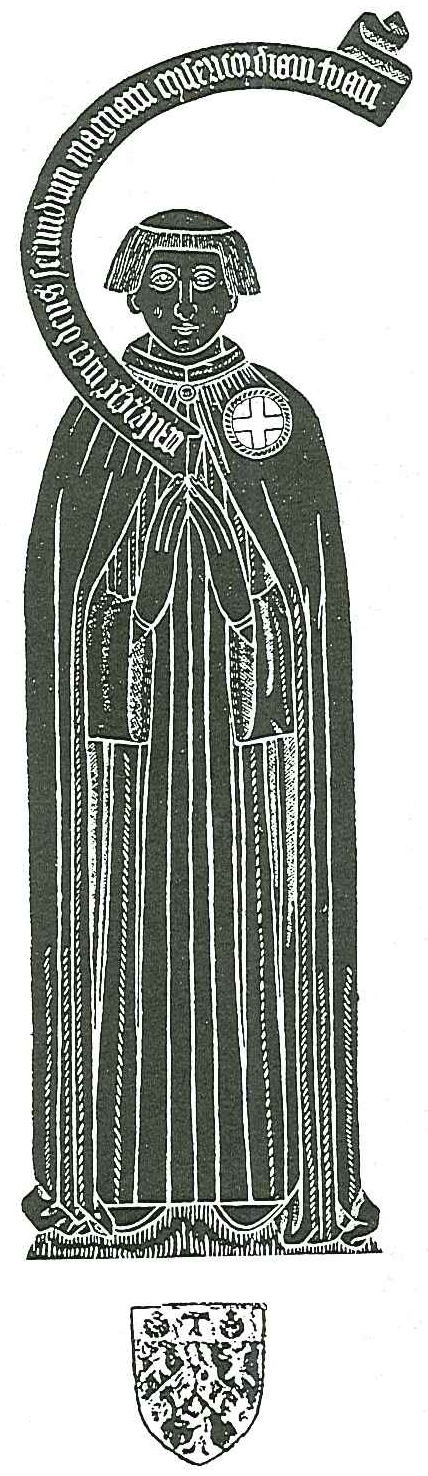
A canon of Windsor, Roger Lupton (died 1540). (Monumental brass at Eton College).

- Dean and Canons of Windsor, aka, the Dean and Canons of the King's free chapel of St. George the Martyr within his castle at Windsor. Freeholders of Sandleford from 1478 to 1875;

== Land holdings ==
=== Original endowment ===
The priory had been richly endowed with properties over a number of years and those which came into the possession of the Dean and Canons included the following: Lands in Bramley, Chiddingfold, and Hambledon, Surrey; the manor of East Enborne, Berkshire; lands in Freefolk, Whitchurch, Hampshire; lands in Kingsclere, Hampshire; lands in Newbury, Berkshire; lands in Newtown, Hampshire; lands in Pamber, Hampshire; the manor of Roke, Odiham, Hampshire; and the rectory of West Ilsley, Berkshire.

The original rhomboid shaped endowment for the Augustinian priory of Sandleford read something like:

with the church and all the lands at Sandelford [Sandleford, aka Sandaleford : ford of the river Ale-burne], as it is bounded by hedges and ditches [i.e. enclosed] and all its appurtenances, And the whole of the wood which is called Brademore [Broadmore], And the whole of the land on each side of the wood, as it is bounded on one side by the watercourse which is called the Aleburne [River Enborne] from the Bridge of Sandleford up to the Aleburne-gate, and on the other-side as far as it is bounded by the road which reaches from Aleburne-gate towards Newbury as far as the croft of William the Hunter, and on the third side so far as the road is carried, thence to the croft of Robert the son of Renbaldi, [Robert fitz Rembaldand], – that is the road that leads to Newbury, and on the fourth side as it is bounded by the same road [A339] as far as the bridge of Sandleford.

An extract of the original Latin foundation description:

... ecclesiam et totam terram de Sandelford, sicuti sepibus vel fossatis circumsepta est, cum omnibus pertinentiis suis, et totum boscum qui vocatur Brademore, et totam terram ex utraque parte jusdem bosci, sicut cingitur ex una parte acqua quae vocatur Aleburne, a ponte de Sandelford usque ad Alburnegate, et in alia parte sicut cingitur via quae extenditur de Alburnegate versus Nyweburie, usque ad croftam Willielmi Venatoris: ...

=== Priory's main holdings in 1291 ===
The taxation roll of Pope Nicholas IV in 1291 names temporalities (secular properties and possessions) that the prior of Sandleford held, which were worth (per annum):

- £2 8s. 8d. at Newbury;
- £1 15s. at Enborne;
- £1 6s. at West Ilsley; and
- 10s. at Aldworth.

=== West Ilsley ===
- Grant [1150 or 1260] by William de Fiscampo [ Fécamp or Fecamp ] to the Church of Saint John the Baptist of Sandleford, of land in Wideheia [Woodhay or West Isley]-(one acre of corn for obleys at the alter, and flour for the brethren serving God in the said Church). Witnesses: Dame Purnella his wife, Filip Croc, John the Chaplain, Geoffrey the Priest, William Bellet, Ralf Piione, Clement Riulfus, Richard Mainesac, Gilbert the Priest and Ralf the Priest.
- Patent Roll, 8 September, Windsor, 1313: Confirmation of the grant and release which Agnes daughter of Henry de Pontaudemer [Pont-Audemer] (a Royal bailiff, of the House of Beaumont) (died circa 1229), sometime the wife of Richard [de] Neirnut, made to the church of St. John the Baptist, Sandelford, and to the prior and canons of that place, of all her lands, rents, and tenements in the town of Westhildeslye (West Ilsley) and of all her right in the advowson of the church of that place, and of a third part of the entire meadow which her father formerly held in the meadow of Sutton in Wolesham (Worsham?), and of a third part of her entire rent in the town of Wallingford; of the grant and release which Matilda de Abyndon, sometime the wife of Bartholomew de Thornton, made to that house of her entire right to the advowson of the church of All Saints, "Westhildesleye; of the grant and release which Miles de Bello Campo (Beauchamp), knight, made to them of his right in the advowson of the said church of Westhildeslye; and of a grant and confirmation which William son of Warin de Cherlton made to them of all his land and tenements in Westhildeslye, and which he held from them. By fine of 5 marks.

Further described in an Inspeximus, dated 1251–1256.

- Peniton. Inspeximus of grant. [1250–1256]: Inspeximus by Agnes Nernut [Neyrnoit or Nervett], Dame de Peniton [Pennington], widow, of the grant by Henry de Pontaudemer, her father, to the Prior and Canons of Sandelford [Sandleford] of a wychwurth of salt to be annually received in his town of Peniton. Witnesses to the confirmation: Sir Nicholas de Henreth, Sheriff of Berks, Sir Alan de Fernham, Sir Walter de Ripariis, Sir Peter de Etingedene, Sir William de Brutenoles, Kts, John Belet of Eneburne, Elias de Bagenore. Witnesses to the original grant are noted as being: Nigel de Boklonde, Ralf Fucher, Adam de Wereborn, Henry de Wodecote, Robert de Treget, Thomas Croc, John Launceleue.
- Inspeximus by Roger de Quency [Quincy], Earl of Winchester, Constable of Scotland, of the grant by Agnes Neyrnut, Dame of Penitune [Peniton], daughter of Henry de Ponte Audemer, widow of Sir Richard Neyrnut, to the Prior and Canons of the Church of Saint John the Baptist of Sandelford [Sandleford], of lands, rents etc, in Westhildesleg [West Ilsley], and also of the advowson of the Church of the same place; and also of lands in Sutton, in Wolesham, and in Walingeford [Wallingford] for the maintenance of a Canon for the souls of herself, her husband, her father, and Matilda, her mother, and of William, her son, at a rental of one penny to herself. Witnesses to the original grant: Sir Nicholas de Henreth, Sheriff of Bercsyre [Berkshire], Sir Alan de Fernham, Sir Walter de Ripariis, Sir Peter de Etingedene, Sir William de Brutenoles, Kts, John Belet of Eneburne, Elias de Bagenore. Witnesses to inspeximus and confirmation: Sir Robert de Quency his brother, Ernaldus de Bosco, William de Bosco, Saher de St Andrews, Peter le Poter, Vrienus de St Peter, Alan de Farnham, Walter de Ripariis, Peter de Hetingdno, Richard de Henreth, Knights, Elias de Bagenore, Geoffrey de Wancy, John de Bruer, Robert de Turberuile, Henry de la Beche.

=== Midgham ===
The priory of Sandleford held land in nearby Midgham. In the 13th century this was assessed as one carucate (normally 120 acres). There were still 37 acres of meadow there that had been leased to those who also leased Sandleford. This connection was mentioned down to the end of the eighteenth century, by when the meadow land was let to members of the Hillersdon, and Poyntz families of Midgham House, viz: William Poyntz (died 1809), John Spencer, 1st Earl Spencer of Althorpe (son-in-law of Stephen Poyntz), Rt. Hon. Stephen Poyntz, and John Hillersdon (died 1730). One of the younger sons of George II, Duke of Cumberland (1721–1765), was partially brought up at Midgham in the household of his governor and steward Stephen Poyntz.

=== Kingsclere Woodlands ===
In 1312 Prior Thomas de Sandleford obtained a licence for alienation in mortmain to this convent of a messuage, 20 acres of land, and 2 acres of meadow in 'Clere Wodelond,' by Kingsclere, Hampshire.

== Trade and Provisions ==
In 1235 the Prior of Sandleford obtained from King Henry III the right to hold a charter fair of four days during the Feast of Saint Matthew the Apostle (21 September), and perhaps another two days around 20–23 September. Suitably enough, 780 years later, the present day Newbury Show, aka Royal County of Berkshire Show, is held over those days. Perhaps one is the successor of the other, afteral the first annual Newbury and District Agricultural Show was held in 1909 on land included in the Priory's original 1190s endowment at Enborne Gate Farm, aka Alburnegate.

In 1293, King Edward I granted the priory free warren on all its demesne lands at Sandleford and Enborne; so long as nevertheless those lands are not within the bounds of our forest. (Note that forest does not mean woods).

== Post-monastic lessees ==
=== Late medieval and Tudor ===
After its abandonment by the canons, the old monastery and its estate was granted to the Dean and Canons of Windsor who leased it out for use as a farm. Few of its tenants lived there, but included:

- A draft lease of the site of Sandleford Priory dated 30 September 1543 reads: Draft for a lease from William Frankeleyn, Dean, and the Canons of Windsor, to John Burges, of London, Doctor in Physick, of their place of Sandylford [Sandleford], in the County of Berks, for forty years at a rental of £10.
- A later muniment, 'Estimate of farm' was entitled: View or estimate of the farm of the priory of Sandylford [Sandleford], and of the free Chapel and Chantry there, with a declaration of the grant of the Dean and Canons of the King's free Chapel of Windsor lately made to John Burges, doctor in physic, etc.

Burgess who died in 1550, had an AM Oxon (1530–1), MB (1533–4), MD, and was admitted a Fellow of the Royal College of Physicians (FRCP) in 1536, was elected Censor and Elect, 1543; Consiliarius, 1544, 1545, 1546; and President, 1547. William Munk says that 'Dr. Burgess was dead on 30 March 1550, when his place of Elect was filled by the appointment of Dr. Caius' .

- A lease dated 11 October 1560 of the site of Sandleford Priory was named: Lease to Thomas Hide of Hurst, in the County of Barks, gentleman, for 6 years for £15, all the scite of the pryarye of Sandylforde [Sandleford] near unto Newberye [Newbury], in the County of Barks., signed Thomas Hyde. A later Thomas Hide (Hyde) of Hurst, Berkshire (died 1652), was son of William Hyde (c.1517–67), MP, and grandson of William Hyde (high sheriff) of the Hyde family of Denchworth.

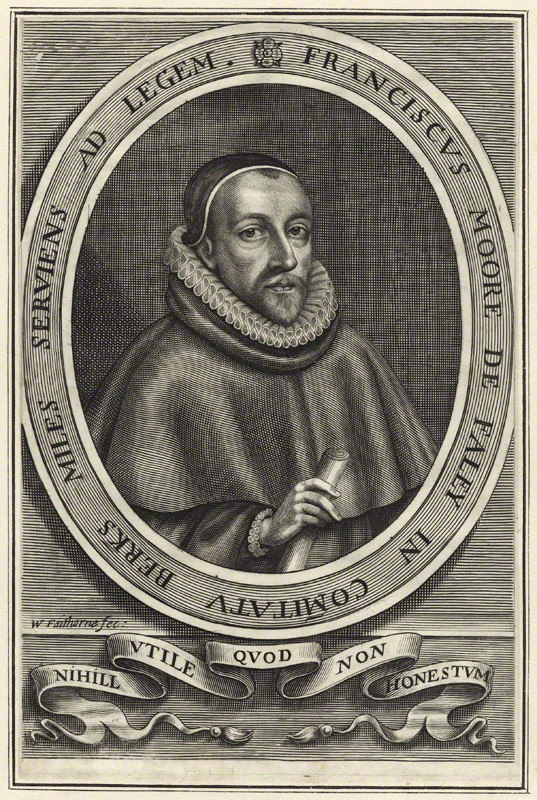
Sir Francis Moore (1599–1621), line engraving by William Faithorne, published in 1663.

- Sir Francis Moore, (1559–1621), Kt., of South Fawley, the barrister (see above, the man who secured Sandleford's independence from Newbury in 1615), MP (for Reading), JP, High Steward of Newbury 1619, and solicitor (1585-c.1608) to the Wizard Earl Henry Percy, 9th Earl of Northumberland, JP, High Steward of Newbury 1619-death, took the leases of Sandleford, dated 3 November 1610, dated 20 April 1612, and 24 May 1615,
- A 1622 lease named William Moore, son of Sir Francis, as the tenant;
- Lease dated, 15 March 1624: Sir Henry Moore, of South Fawley, Bt., bought a baronetcy in 1626; son of Sir Francis

=== Commonwealth and Protectorate ===
In October 1642, Colonel John Venn and twelve companies of foot soldiers took possession of Windsor Castle on behalf of Parliament, and soon after 23 May 1643 the Dean (Dr. Christopher Wren) and Canons left. On 17 October 1650 Sandleford and the estates that had come to the Dean and Canons of Windsor via Sandleford would have been included in an Act for sale of the Manors of Rectories and Glebelands late belonging to the late Archbishops, bishops, Deans, Deans and Chapters was passed, and in an Additional Act for more speedy effecting the sale of the Manors of Rectories and Glebe-lands late belonging to Archbishops, Bishops, Deans, Deans and Chapters, and other Officers and Titles which late were of or belonging to any Cathedral or Collegiate Church or Chapel in England or Wales; and for the encouragement of lenders upon the security thereof; and of other Lands and Hereditaments of the said Deans, Deans and Chapters, etc. which was added on 22 October 1650.

=== The Staples family ===
A quitclaim dated 20 May 1662 states: Alexander Staples of the Middle Temple and Thomas Staples of the same for £200 paid by the Dean and Canons renounce and give a quittance of all their rights in Sandleford Priory. The scite of Sandelford Priory was by the trustees appointed by act of Parliament, 20 June 1651, sold to Thomas Bales of the Middle Temple, and he 25 February sold the same to Alexander Staples, and he settled it on Thomas Staples and his heirs.

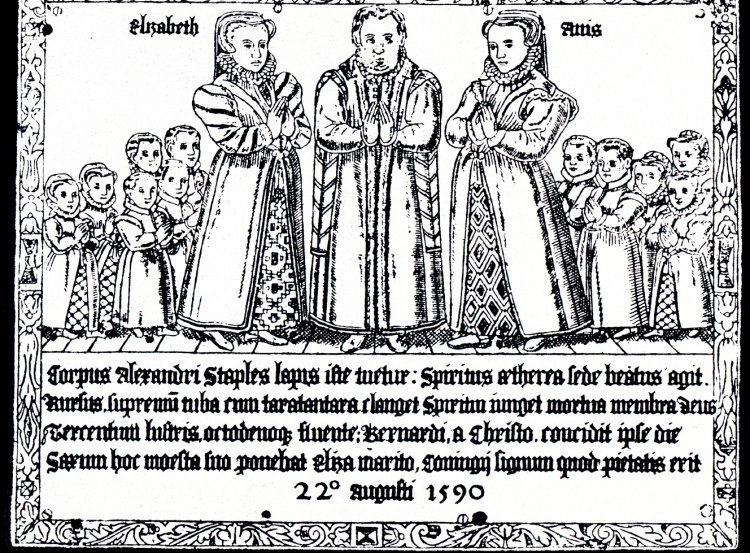
Rubbing of the Brass tomb plate of Alexander Staples of Yate Court (d. 1590), showing with his many siblings his son Alexander.

Alexander Staples, son of Alexander Staples of Yate Court, Gloucestershire, (died 1590) by his second wife Elizabeth, was Mayor of Nottingham in 1629, and heir of the bulk of his estate of his 'kinsman' Alderman Robert Staples (died 1632), of Nottingham and Mapperley, cordwainer, Freeman of Nottingham, MP for Nottingham in 1615, and Lord Mayor of Nottingham in 1601, 1608, 1615 and 1622. Alexander Staples' youngest brother is presumed to have been Sir Thomas Staples, 1st Baronet (died 1653), of Lissan House, admitted to Middle Temple on 27 May 1606 and who left Bristol for Ulster c.1610.

Thomas Staples of Maidenhead, was named as the Steward of Windsor Court in the case of Vasper & wife v [James] East, 1685. One of the judges was George Jeffreys, 1st Baron Jeffreys and at the time Henry, Earl of Arundel & Lord Mowbray was Constable of Windsor Castle.

By January 1689/90 however, Thomas Staples was proving to make the Oath to the new King. The House of Lords Journal, Volume 14, for 22 January 1689 reports that: Staples, Steward of Windsor, sent for, for refusing to give the Oaths. Upon Information given to this House, 'That Mr. Thomas Staples, Steward of Windsor Forrest, hath refused to give the Oaths of Allegiance and Supremacy and the Test to Mr. Charles Cleve Master of the Hospital of Oakingham, and Mr. William Walker Vicar of Sunning: It is thereupon ORDERED, by the Lords Spiritual and Temporal assembled at Westminster, That the said Thomas Staples be, and is hereby, required to attend this House on Friday next, being the 25th Day of this Instant January, at Ten of the Clock in the Forenoon, as he will answer the contrary to this House at his Peril.'

And on 'DIE Veneris, 25 die Januarii.' Staple's Examination about refusing to tender the Oaths deferred. The House being moved, 'That Mr. Thomas Staples, Steward of Windsor Court, who, by Order of the 22th [sic] Instant, was to appear this Day, attended at the Door; but not being able to get his Witnesses ready against this Day, might have longer Time given him for that Purpose:' It is ORDERED, by the Lords Spiritual and Temporal assembled at Westm. That the said Thomas Staples be, and is hereby, required to attend this House on Friday the 8th Day of February next, at Ten of the Clock in the Forenoon.

The house was eventually leased to the Kingsmill family who converted the remains of the priory into a country house. It is now the home of St Gabriel's School.

== Bibliography ==
- Evelyn Elizabeth Myers (c. 1872–1909), A History of Sandleford Priory, Newbury District Field Club, Special Publication. no. 1. (finished by 1906) published 1931.
- Penelope Stokes, Enborne and Wash Common, Hamstead Marshall, 2011.
- Walter Money, FSA, A History of the Ancient Town and Borough of Newbury, in the County of Berkshire, Parker & Co., Oxford & London, 1887.
- Dr. Kathleen Hapgood Thompson, The Counts of the Perche, 1066–1217, Sheffield, 1995.
- Dr. Kathleen Thompson, Power and Border Lordship in Medieval France, the County of the Perche, 1000–1226, Boydell, 2013.
- Kathleen Thompson, Honorary Research Fellow, University of Sheffield, Matilda, Countess of the Perche (1171–1210): the expression of authority in name, style and seal, 2003.
- Transactions of the Newbury District Field Club; vol. 12, no. 6, 1980–1981, "The history of Sandleford Priory", Miss C. Sheila Hay.
- Transactions of the Newbury District Field Club; vol. 13, 1983–1989, "The chapel at Sandleford Priory", by Roger H. Pope and R. Durham.
- A History of the County of Berkshire; vol. 4, edited by William Page and P. H. Ditchfield, Victoria County History, London, 1924.
- Edward William Gray The History and Antiquities of Newbury and its Environs, Speenhamland, 1839.
