= Sandleford Priory =

Sandleford Priory may refer to:

- Sandleford Priory (monastery)
- Sandleford Priory (country house)
- St Gabriel's School
