= Rotrou =

Rotrou is a medieval French name, derived from a Germanic name Rothrod.

- Rotrou I, Count of Perche
- Rotrou II, Count of Perche
- Rotrou III, Count of Perche (bef. 1080 – 1144)
- Rotrou IV, Count of Perche
- Rotrou (Archbishop of Rouen) (1109 – 1183/84)
- Jean Rotrou (1609 - 1650), French poet and playwright
- Nogent-le-Rotrou, a subprefecture and commune in Eure-et-Loir, France
