= Stephen du Perche (died 1205) =

French nobleman and crusader

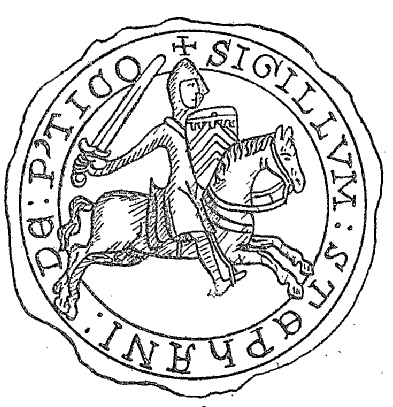
Stephen's seal

Stephen du Perche (died 14/17 April 1205) was a French nobleman and crusader. He was a partisan of the Plantagenets in their conflict with the French crown and held fiefs from them. A younger son, he governed the County of Perche on behalf of his father and brother during their absence on crusade. He himself joined the Fourth Crusade in 1202 and travelled to the Holy Land. Afterwards, he went to the Latin Empire and was appointed duke of Philadelphia in Asia Minor in 1204. He died in battle against the Bulgars.

== Early life ==
Born before 1173, Stephen was the second of five sons of Count Rotrou IV of Perche and his wife Matilda, daughter of Theobald, count of Blois and Chartres. He was named after his uncle, Stephen, archbishop of Palermo. His younger brothers entered the church.

His father and older brother, Geoffrey III, joined the Third Crusade in 1189. During their absence, Stephen shared the administration of the county with the seneschal Warin of Lonray. After Geoffrey's return in 1192 or 1193, Stephen accompanied him to England. It has sometimes been thought that Stephen and Geoffrey divided the Perche between themselves, but this is based on a misreading of a document of 1202.

Around 1200, Stephen gave land he possessed at Arponnel and in the forested gâtines (wasteland) between Chartres and Thiron-Gardais to the Knights Templar.

== Anglo-Norman service ==
By the early 1190s, Stephen held rights to a portion of the comital revenues of the manors at Rivray, Montlandon and Nonvilliers, the mills at La Poterie and the salt works at Nogent-le-Rotrou. By 1195, he had entered the service of King Richard I of England, who was also Duke of Normandy. He was receiving arrears of payments from the Exchequer of Normandy as late as 1200. At some point prior to 1198, Stephen was granted temporary control of the lands of Fulk of Aunou in the Hiémois. In August 1198, Stephen was with Richard at Orival. A little later in 1198, Richard granted Stephen a money fief and Stephen fought for Richard in the war with France that year.

In July 1200, King John of England, Richard's successor, appointed Stephen castellan of Châteauneuf-sur-Sarthe in the County of Anjou. Stephen, however, had to give up the royal grant of lands he had received at Chambois, where he was reaping the profits of a Jewish moneylender he had brought in from the Île-de-France. These lands were passed on to William Marshal. In the autumn of 1201, when King John returned to Anjou after a circuit of the Duchy of Aquitaine, Stephen stood as a guarantor of the settlement reached between John and one of his most powerful Angevin vassals, Juhel III of Mayenne, who had supported John's rival for the throne, Arthur of Brittany, in 1199.

== Fourth Crusade ==
In 1200, Stephen's brother Geoffrey joined the Fourth Crusade. He spent much of the next two years preparing, but he died just before Easter 1202. Among his pious acts of preparation was the grant of a charter to Le Mans Cathedral promising comital protection for its property at Courgenard in the Perche. Stephen swore to respect Geoffrey's promise to Le Mans. He had committed to the crusade by January 1202, when he mortgaged his properties at Langeais to cover his expenses. Geoffrey, on his deathbed at Le Theil, entrusted command of the Percheron contingent to Stephen. In May 1202, King John stood as surety for a loan to Stephen from the Templars and Hospitallers. During the interval between his brother's death and his departure, Stephen seems to have governed the county of Perche again. After his departure, Geoffrey's widow Matilda took over the regency for her minor son, Thomas.

In June, Stephen and the Percheron contingent joined the main French force massing at Chartres. He made several religious bequests before departing, including the endowment of a memorial requiem mass for himself to be celebrated in Chartres Cathedral annually on the anniversary of his death. In June, he also confirmed his sister-in-law's endowment of an annual requiem for his brother. He probably travelled in the company of his cousin Count Louis I of Blois.

Stephen made the rendezvous at Venice in October 1202, but he was physically incapable of leaving with the army. His ship, the Violet, sank shortly after sailing and it is unclear if Stephen was injured in the wreck or if he had not been aboard because of an illness. In this way he avoided the controversial siege of Zara in November. In March 1203 he decided not to rejoin the main army and went to southern Italy with Rotrou of Montfort and Yves of La Jaille. From there they sailed directly to the Holy Land, possibly in the same flotilla or ship as Simon de Montfort.

== Baron in Greece ==
Only after the sack of Constantinople did Stephen rejoin the army to help defend the conquests. He returned from the Holy Land with Renaud of Montmirail. In 1204, after the partition of the Byzantine Empire by the crusaders, the new emperor Baldwin I granted Stephen the duchy of Philadelphia in Asia Minor as an imperial fief. It is not likely that much or any of this fief was under crusader control at the time. Nevertheless, Stephen distributed fiefs to his own vassals within his duchy. The grant of a large and autonomous fief, as connoted by the term "duchy", is an indication that Stephen was considered among the first rank of crusaders. The actual ruler of Philadelphia, Theodore Mangaphas, was defeated by the imperial regent Henry of Flanders at the battle of Adramyttion on 19 March 1205, bringing at least part of the region briefly under crusader control.

Stephen was one of twelve barons who sat on the council that advised the emperor. In Constantinople, he seems to have rejoined the following of Louis of Blois. On 3 April 1205, he was at the siege of Adrianople, which had been occupied by Tsar Kaloyan of Bulgaria. He joined Louis and Renaud of Montmirail on a foraging expedition and, on 14 April, all three were killed while pursuing a Cuman force. According to the necrology of Chartres, however, his requiem was celebrated on 17 April.

Stephen's participation in the crusade and his brief career in Greece is narrated in Geoffrey of Villehardouin's chronicle and the Devastatio Constantinopolitana.

== Sources ==
- Baldwin, John W. (2002). Aristocratic Life in Medieval France. Johns Hopkins University.
- Hendrickx, Benjamin (2015). "Les duchés de l'Empire latin de Constantinople après 1204: origine, structures et statuts". Revue belge de Philologie et d'Histoire. 93 (2): 303–328. doi:10.3406/rbph.2015.8837.
- Longnon, Jean (1978). Les compagnons de Villehardouin: Recherches sur les croisés de la quatrième croisade. Geneva: Librairie Droz.
- Queller, D. E.; Compton, T. K.; Campbell, D. A. (1974). "The Fourth Crusade: The Neglected Majority". Speculum. 49 (3): 441–465. doi:10.2307/2851751. JSTOR 2851751. S2CID 163442765.
- Thompson, Kathleen H. (1995). The Counts of the Perche, c.1066–1217 (PDF) (PhD diss.). University of Sheffield.
- Thompson, Kathleen (1998). "Family Tradition and the Crusading Impulse: The Rotrou Counts of the Perche". Medieval Prosopography. 19: 1–33.
- Thompson, Kathleen H. (2002). Power and Border Lordship in Medieval France: The County of the Perche, 1000–1226. Boydell Press.
- Wolff, Robert L. (1969). "The Latin Empire of Constantinople, 1204–1261". In R. L. Wolff; H. W. Hazard (eds.). History of the Crusades, Vol. 2: The Later Crusades, 1189–1311. University of Wisconsin Press. pp. 186–233.
- Van Tricht, Filip (2011). The Latin Renovatio of Byzantium: The Empire of Constantinople (1204–1228). Brill.
