= Rotrou IV of Perche =

Rotrou IV (1135-1191) was the count of Perche. He joined Louis VII of France in a war against Henry II of England, in which he lost lands to the English. Rotrou later went on crusade with Philip II of France and died after the Siege of Acre in 1191.

== Biography ==
Born in 1135, Rotrou was the son of Count Rotrou III of Perche, and Hawise, daughter of Walter of Salisbury, and Sibilla de Chaworth.

Upon the death of his father in 1144, Rotrou continued the fight against his archenemy, Count William III of Ponthieu, lord of Alençon. Aside from this long-running blood feud, his uncle Patrick had married William' daughter Adela. His mother Hawise and her second husband, Robert I of Dreux, served as regents at Perche until he reached the age of maturity.

Rotrou aided King Louis VII of France against King Henry II of England in an ineffective war that saw their troops routed, lands ravaged and property stolen. He was forced to yield the communes of Moulins and Bonsmoulins to the crown of England. Nevertheless, a matrimonial alliance with the House of Blois consolidated the declining power of the counts of Perche.

In 1189, Rotrou joined Kings Philip II of France and Richard I of England in the Third Crusade. He died sometime after the Siege of Acre in 1191.

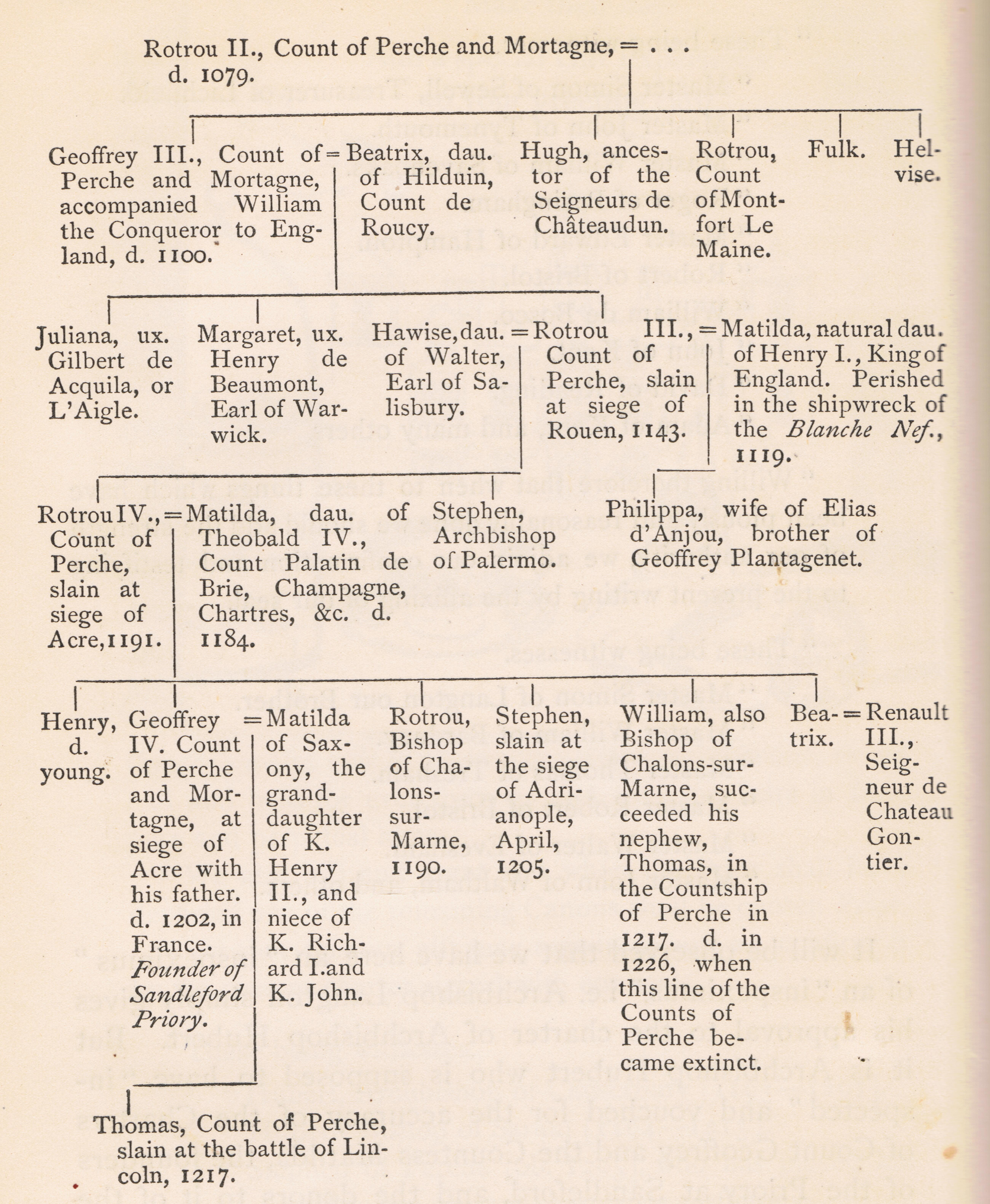
Family tree of Rotrou de Perche.

== Marriage and issue ==
In 1160, Rotrou married Matilda, daughter of Theobald IV of Blois and Matilda of Carinthia.

Rotrou and Matilda had:

- Geoffrey III of Perche
- Stephen (d. 14 April 1205), duke of Philadelphia, killed in the Battle of Adrianople
- Rotrou (d. 10 December 1201), bishop of Chalons (1190-1200)
- William II of Perche, bishop of Chalons
- Beatrix, married Renaud III, lord of Chateau-Gonthier

Rotrou was succeeded as count of Perche by his son Geoffrey upon his death.

== Sources ==
- Baldwin, John W. (2002). Aristocratic Life in Medieval France. Johns Hopkins University.
- Civel, Nicolas (2006). La fleur de France: les seigneurs d'Ile-de-France au XIIe siècle (in French). Brepols.
- Fassler, Margot Elsbeth (2010). The Virgin of Chartres: Making History Through Liturgy and the Arts. Yale University Press.
- Thompson, Kathleen (1998). "Family Tradition and the Crusading Impulse: The Rotrou Counts of the Perche". Medieval Prosopography. 19: 1–33.
- Thompson, Kathleen (2002). Power and Border Lordship in Medieval France: The County of the Perche, 1000-1226. The Boydell Press.
- Van Tricht, Filip (2011). The Latin Renovatio of Byzantium: The Empire of Constantinople (1204–1228). Leiden: Brill. ISBN 978-90-04-20323-5.

French nobility
Preceded by Rotrou III	Count of Perche; 1144–1191	Succeeded by Geoffrey III
