= Fawley, Berkshire =

Coordinates: 51°31′08″N 1°26′06″W

Fawley
- Village
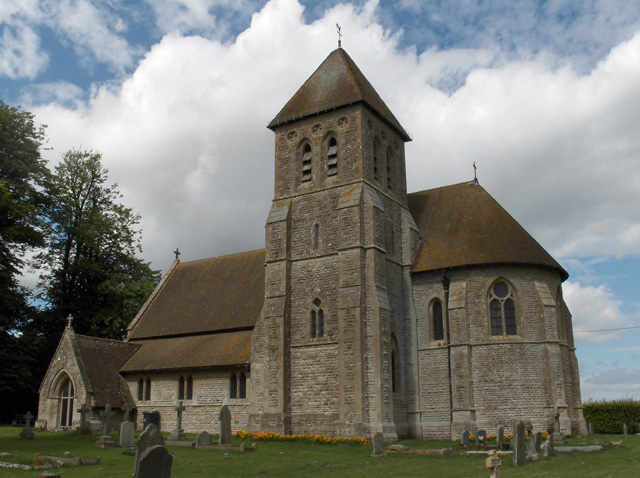
- St Mary's church

- Location within Berkshire
- Area: 8.78 km^{2} (3.39 sq mi)
- Population: 165 (2011 census)
  - Density: 19/km^{2} (49/sq mi)
- OS grid reference: SU4503
- Civil parish: Fawley
- Unitary authority: West Berkshire
- Ceremonial county: Berkshire
- Region: South East
- Country: England
- Sovereign state: United Kingdom
- Post town: WANTAGE
- Postcode district: OX12
- Dialling code: 01488
- Police: Thames Valley
- Fire: Royal Berkshire
- Ambulance: South Central
- UK Parliament: Newbury

Fawley is a village and civil parish in West Berkshire, England. The hub of the village is centred 3.5 miles (5.6 km) east of Lambourn and has a sub-community within its bounds, Little or South Fawley. It includes the depopulated small hill settlement of Whatcombe. Fawley is the inspiration for "Marygreen" in Thomas Hardy's Jude the Obscure.

== Geography ==
The area is wholly on part of the escarpment of the highest uplands in the county which cross into south-west Oxfordshire, the Berkshire Downs. The nucleus of the village is "Great Fawley" or "North Fawley" with the other settled place in the parish being South Fawley or Little Fawley, 0.6 miles (1.0 km) further south. The Ridgeway, an 87-mile path, passes in the neighbouring parish to the north. In the south of the parish is a slight peak of the downs, where there is a trigonometrical point to survey the surrounding landscape. Most of the land to the west, including Lambourn, has only north–south public roads with the area in between, which is made up with high fields, commons and small woods, accessible by bridleways and footpaths.

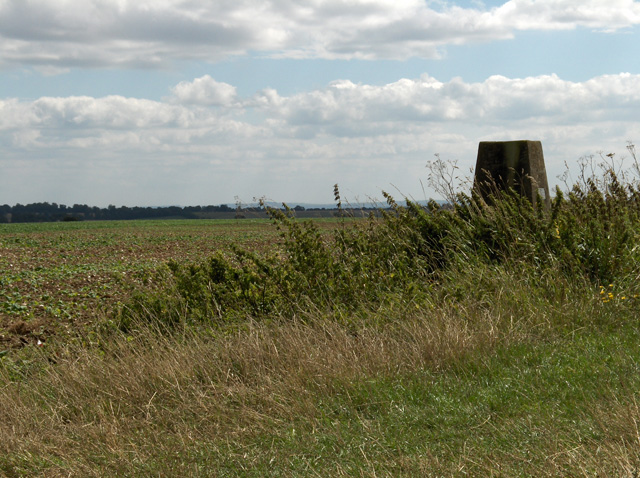
Trig point in the south of the civil parish

== History ==
Some Roman graves were discovered in April 1883 on a hill between North and South Fawley. The area formerly contained a rural area known as the liberty of Whatcombe. This briefly appeared in medieval records as an ecclesiastical parish of its own and to have had a church in the time of Henry II who confirmed its appropriation to Hurley Priory. The north manor house and combined rectory belonged to the nunnery of Ambresbury, also known as Amesbury Abbey. The original foundation was dissolved in 1772 and replaced by nuns from Fontevrault Abbey, in France. The ecclesiastical parish of Fawley once had its own benefice, which following appropriation (which took place before 1086) became a vicarage. However its need for its own minister ceased and the area's Church of England priest today is the rector of Great Shefford ministering to the rural benefice of West Downland. Its patrons were in 1870 Mr. and Mrs. Wroughton.

Edmund de Polhampton, lord of the south manor, died in 1353 of wounds received in a quarrel at Enborne and his eldest son Richard sold the manor house in 1364 to Edmund Chelrey or Childrey. A Nicholas Radishe sold the south manor in 1594 to Francis Moore...of East Ilsley...knighted on 17 March 1616...M.P. for Boroughbridge in 1588–9...for Reading in 1597–8, 1601, 1604–11 and 1614. He obtained a grant of free warren in 1620 and died owning the manors of North and South Fawley on 21 September 1621...[on son,] Francis's death soon afterwards [these] passed to his brother Henry, who was created a baronet of Fawley on 18 May 1627 and ceased when Sir Thomas Moore died in 1807. The population in 1871 was 243 and the parish had 52 houses.

== Church ==
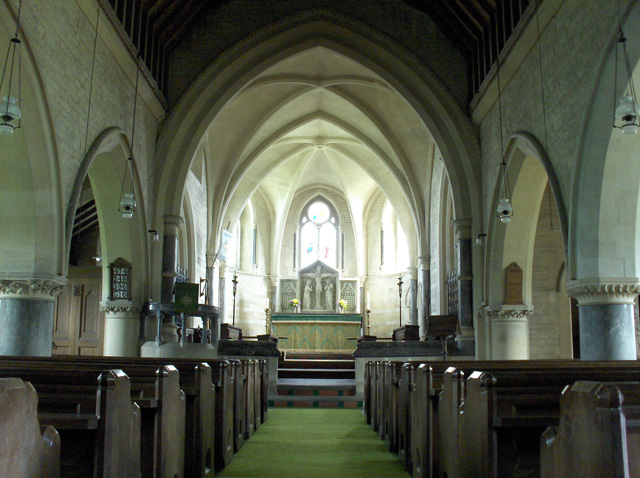
In the nave of St Mary's, looking east towards the chancel

The Church of England parish church of Saint Mary the Virgin was designed by the architect George Edmund Street and built in 1865–66. It has one stained glass window by William Morris. The chancel has a reredos that includes a mosaic by Salviati and a Crucifixion carved by Thomas Earp. It has been protected under the commonest category of listed building (Grade II). The church replaces a medieval building that stood slightly further east and was demolished in 1866. The new church incorporates original Early English fragments that suggest the former church was at least partly late 12th or early 13th century.

== In popular culture ==
Fawley was the poor and depressed home of author Thomas Hardy's paternal grandmother, Mary Head; the main character in Jude the Obscure, stonemason Jude Fawley, lived in the fictional village of Marygreen, and a relative, one of Hardy's biographers, links the memories of this woman, who had a very depressing childhood, to the book's bleak start. The house in which she lived is now called Jude Cottage.

== Notable residents ==
William Bradshaw, D.D., vicar of Fawley (1717–1723), served equally as Bishop of Bristol and Dean of Christ Church, Oxford for the remaining six years of his life.

== Demography ==
Of its 68 homes in 2011, 24 were privately let, the most common category in this parish. Further land use statistics were as follows:

2011 Census Key Statistics
Output area	Population	Homes	Owned outright	Owned with a loan	Privately rented	Socially rented	Other	km^{2}	km^{2} Greenspace (Note: Comprises cultivated fields, pasture, woodland and common.)	km^{2} gardens	km^{2} road
Fawley (civil parish)	165	68	18	13	24	1	12	8.8	8.7	0.04	0.06

== Sources ==
- Pevsner, Nikolaus (1966). Berkshire. The Buildings of England. Harmondsworth: Penguin Books. p. 148.
