= Geoffrey III of Perche =

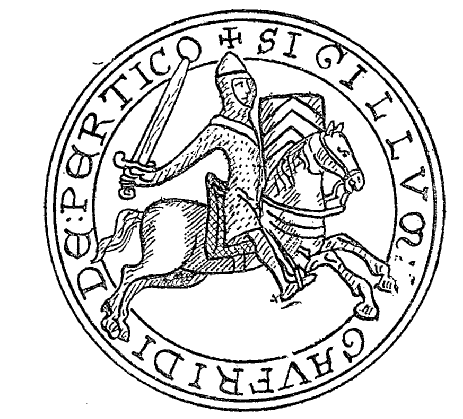
Geoffroy III du Perche

Geoffrey III (died 5 April 1202) was the count of Perche from 1191 until his death.

He was the son of Count Rotrou IV of Perche, and Matilda, daughter of Count Theobald II of Champagne, and Matilda of Carinthia.

He accompanied his father to the Third Crusade and participated in the Siege of Acre, where his father was killed. Back from the Holy Land, he sold more land to the abbeys in order to replenish his finances depleted by his participation in the crusade. He then fought King Richard I of England under the banner of King Philip II of France and in 1194, he managed to recover the commune of Bonsmoulins that his father had yielded to King Henry II of England.

When Richard sent an army to regain control of Normandy, Geoffrey, as a French army commander, helped defeat him. John, the brother and successor of Richard, was forced to renounce England's claim to Normandy in 1204.

In 1202, Geoffrey and his brother Stephen decided to take part in the Fourth Crusade, but he died at Soissons during Lent before he could set out. At Chartres Cathedral, an anniversary mass was said for his soul on 5 April, presumably the date of his death.

Little is known about Geoffrey's first wife, Matilda. His second wife was another Matilda, daughter of Duke Henry the Lion of Saxony and Bavaria and Matilda of England. They married in 1189 in Rouen, and King Richard, uncle of the bride, granted them land in the counties of Suffolk, Essex and Kent previously owned by Henry of Essex. Geoffrey and his second wife had two children:

- Geoffrey
- Thomas, Count of Perche

Geoffrey was succeeded by his son Thomas upon his death.

== Sources ==
- Longnon, Jean (1978). Les compagnons de Villehardouin: Recherches sur les croisés de la quatrième croisade. Geneva: Librairie Droz.
- Baldwin, John W. (2002). Aristocratic Life in Medieval France. Johns Hopkins University.
- Thompson, Kathleen (2013). Power and Border Lordship in Medieval France: The County of the Perche, 1000–1226. The Boydell Press.

French nobility
Preceded by Rotrou IV	Count of Perche; 1191–1202	Succeeded by Thomas
