= South Fawley =

Coordinates: 51°30′N 1°26′W

- Village
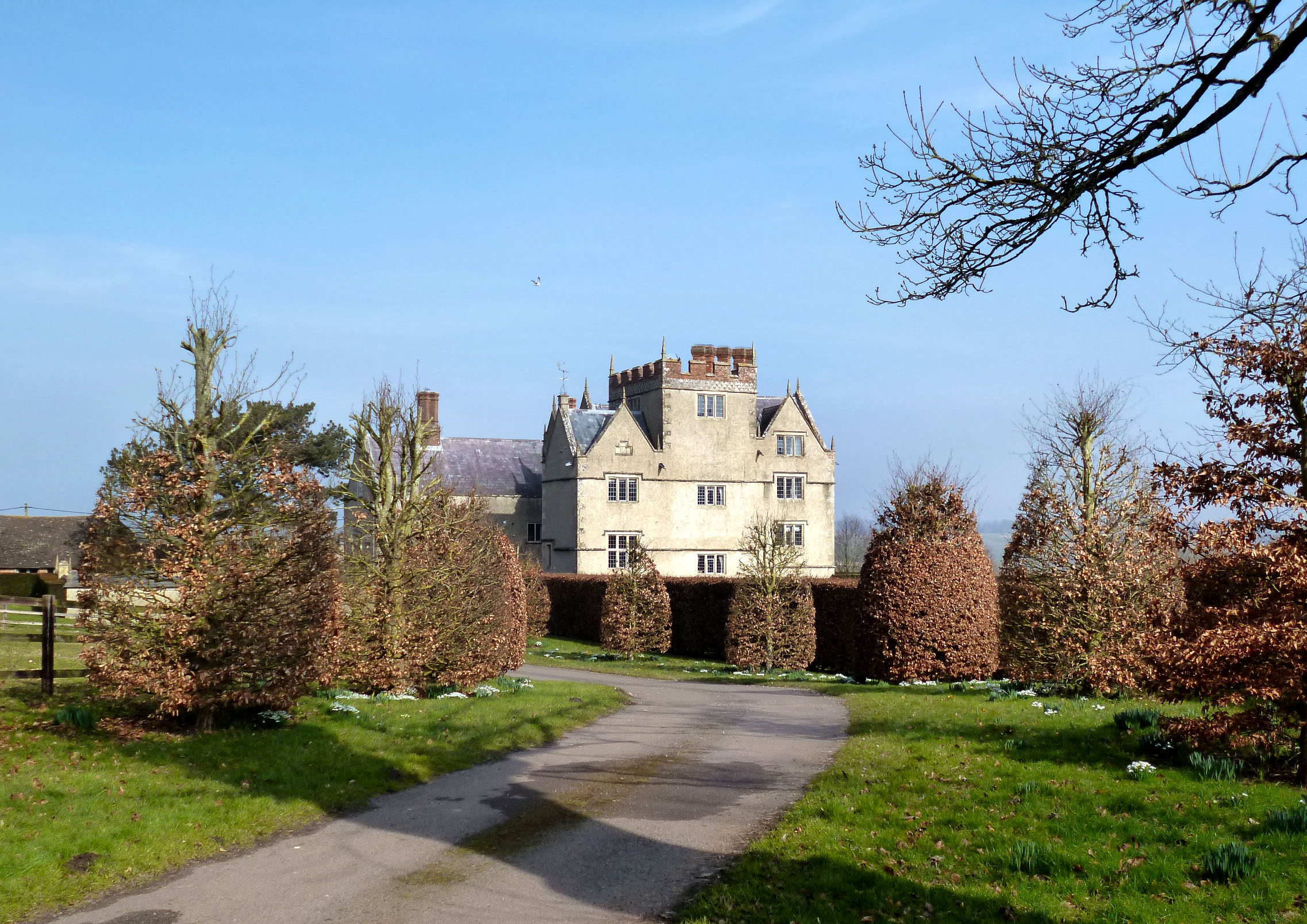
- Fawley Manor

- Location within Berkshire
- OS grid reference: SU 3903 8019
- Unitary authority: West Berkshire
- Ceremonial county: Berkshire
- Region: South East
- Country: England
- Sovereign state: United Kingdom
- Post town: Wantage
- Postcode district: OX12
- Dialling code: 01488
- Police: Thames Valley
- Fire: Royal Berkshire
- Ambulance: South Central
- UK Parliament: Newbury

South Fawley is a small village in the civil parish of Fawley in the English county of Berkshire. According to the Post Office, South Fawley Farm's population as taken at the 2011 Census was included in the civil parish of Chaddleworth. Much of the remainder of the village was included in the civil parish of Fawley. It is situated off the A338 between Great Shefford and Wantage, just south of its counterpart Fawley, or North Fawley, in the West Berkshire district.

It has a fine early 17th century Grade II* listed manor house built for Sir Francis Moore. The manor house is at the centre of the small settlement. The staircase is oak with turned balusters and massive newels. It was built around 1614, but a considerable part at the north end had been taken down by 1900. None of the other buildings in the parish are listed except a farm. Richard Symonds recorded the quartering [billeting] of Lord Bernard Stewart and his troop of the King's Life Guards at Little Fawley and 'the neate and faire habitacion [home] of the Lady Moore,' on 19 November 1644. He stated that the arms of Moore, with the motto 'Regi et legi' were then painted over the porch, together with Moore impaling Twittye, and the motto 'Suum cuique pulchrum.'
