= Battle of Adrianople (1205) =

Bulgarian victory over the Latin Empire

Coordinates: 41.6667°N 26.5667°E

- Part of Bulgarian–Latin wars
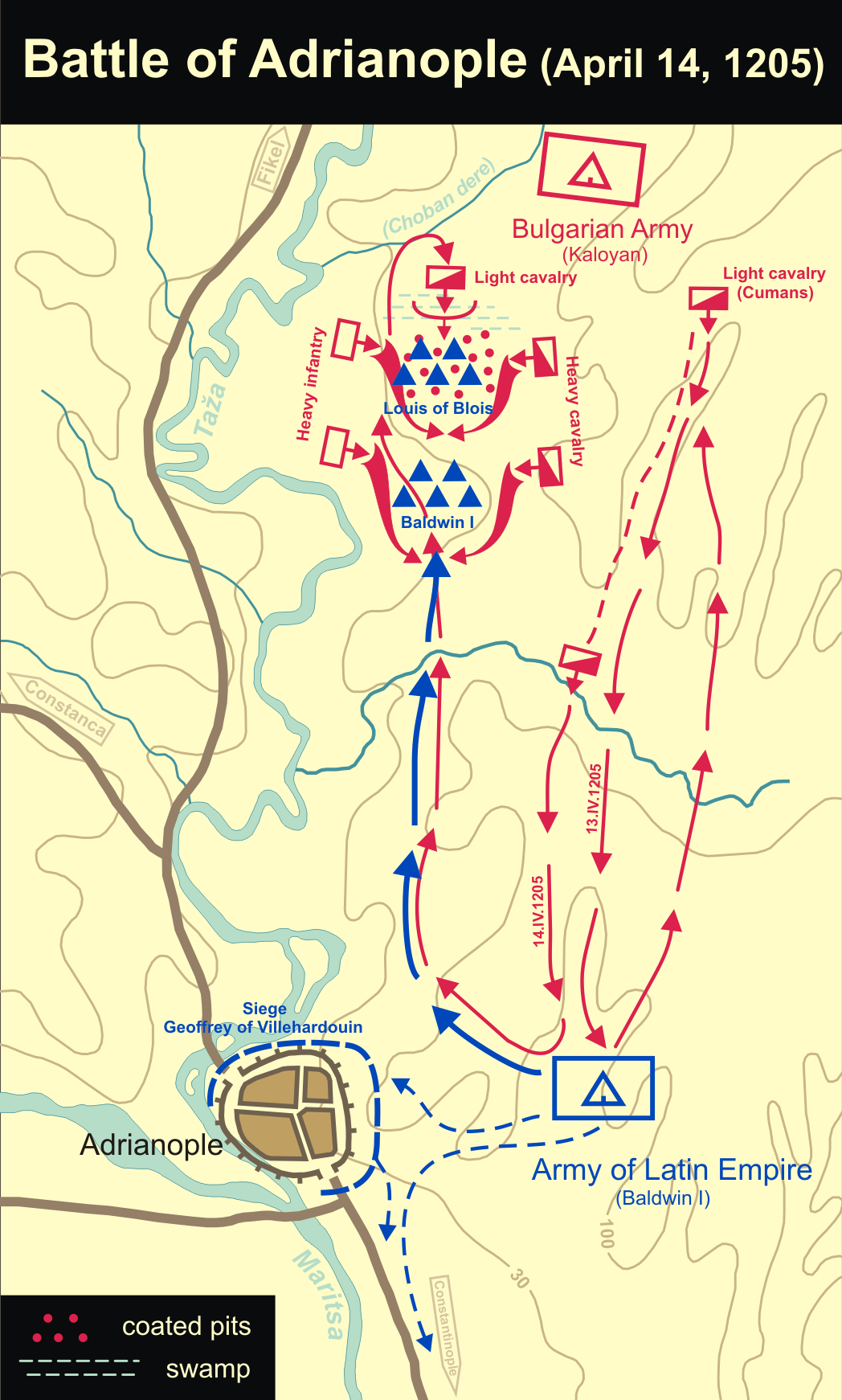
Date	April 14, 1205
Location	Surroundings of Adrianople, Thrace (modern-day Edirne, Turkey)
Result	Bulgarian victory

Belligerents
Second Bulgarian Empire Cumans	Latin Empire; Republic of Venice

Commanders and leaders
Kaloyan of Bulgaria	Baldwin I (POW); Louis of Blois †; Renaud de Montmirail †; Stephen du Perche †; Geoffrey Villehardouin; Enrico Dandolo; Manessier of L'Isle

Strength
Geoffrey of Villehardouin: around 40,000 Bulgarians and Vlachs (infantry, cavalry and archers) and 14,000 Cumans (light & missile cavalry)	c. 4,000; 300 heavy knights (mainly from France)

Casualties and losses
Unknown	Heavy

The Battle of Adrianople occurred around Adrianople on April 14, 1205, between Bulgarians, Cumans and Vlachs under the command of Tsar Kaloyan of Bulgaria, and Crusaders under Baldwin I, who only months before had been crowned Emperor of Constantinople, allied with Venetians under Doge Enrico Dandolo. The battle was won by the Bulgarian Empire after a successful ambush.

== Background ==
In 1204, financial difficulties led the armies of the Fourth Crusade to deviate from their intended goal of Jerusalem. Instead, they captured and sacked Constantinople, the capital of the Byzantine Empire. The Byzantine government was driven out of the city, and a Latin Empire established in its place. At first this new power controlled only the environs of Constantinople and the province of Thrace, but eventually it expanded into Bithynia, Thessaly and central and southern Greece.

Around the same time, Tsar Kaloyan, the Tsar of Bulgaria, successfully completed negotiations with Pope Innocent III. The Bulgarian ruler was recognized as "rex", i.e. emperor (tsar), while the Bulgarian archbishop regained the title "primas", equal to that of patriarch. This might have made for good relations between Tsar Kaloyan and the new Western European conquerors, but immediately after settling in Constantinopole the Latins stated their pretensions on Bulgarian lands. Knights began crossing the border to pillage Bulgarian towns and villages. These belligerent actions convinced the Bulgarian Emperor to abandon the prospect of a Latin alliance, turning instead to the Greeks in the unconquered regions of Thrace. In the winter of 1204-1205 messengers of the local Greek aristocracy visited Kaloyan and an alliance was formed.

In the spring of 1205, Didymoteicho and Adrianople revolted, followed soon after by the entirety of Thrace. Emperor Baldwin I marched his army north and reached Adrianople by the end of March.

== Siege ==
The Latins did not attack the castle head on; rather, they began a prolonged siege, in order to tire the defenders. By surrounding the city with siege machinery and digging mines under the walls, they greatly weakened the defences and patiently waited for an opening. The main forces of Latin knights created well-structured guarded camps around the city to spot and ward off any aid that may have come. In front of each gate of the castle walls a unit was placed, which notably included a Venetian contingent led by Doge Enrico Dandolo.

Honouring his obligations to the rebellious Greeks, Tsar Kaloyan arrived with his army and encamped approximately 25 kilometers northeast of the city on April 10, 1205. According to Geoffrey of Villehardouin, a French historian and knight who had accompanied the Crusaders to the Balkans, the army consisted of up to 54,000 men.

== Location of the battle ==
Numerous researchers pinpoint the location of the battle north of Adrianople and near the keep of Vukelon - K. Jireče, V. Guzelev, St. Boyadjiev - yet there is no conclusive evidence.

According to Niketas Choniates, a Byzantine historian, in the day of the battle Tsar Kaloyan chose the place of the ambush in the following manner: "After which Yoan and his army hid in the ravines, entered the precipice and through those steep places crept to the highlands, making sure their opponents did not notice they were there". In other scriptures, it reads "...and hid in the narrows in the shadowy forests".

Tricked by the Cuman cavalry, the knights chased them for at least two leagues before reaching the place of the ambush, which is between 7 and 9 kilometers, depending on which French league Geoffrey of Villehardouin was using. According to Alberic of Trois-Fontaines, the location of the battle was "plentiful with water marshes".

Nowadays, the most common site that is pointed as the place of the battle are the meanders of the Tùndzha river.

== Forces ==
=== Army of Tsar/King Kaloyan ===
According to the French historian Geoffrey of Villehardouin, the Bulgarian army numbered around 54,000 strong. Within that army was the light cavalry of the Cumans, which, at that time, were allies or mercenaries of Kaloyan, as the Tsar himself was married to the Cuman princess Anna. The French historian points out that there were about 14,000 of them and that "... they were not christened". Nonetheless, their cavalry played a key role in the battle.

The Vlachs —ancestors of modern Romanians - dispersed across much of the Balkan Peninsula —formed a significant component of the Bulgarian army. Their close alliance with the Bulgarians had developed during the joint uprising of 1185–1186, which led to the restoration of the Bulgarian Empire.

Army of the Latin Empire and Venice

The Latin army at Adrianople had about 300 knights. They were accompanied by a number of cavalry and infantry (likely no more than 1000-1500 soldiers) and the Venetian forces, which, according to some sources, also numbered 1000-1500. The total number of troops was no greater than four thousand, yet it is not clear how many soldiers took part in the battle and how many stayed under the walls to continue the siege.

Geoffrey of Villehardouin points out that the majority of the knights, each with his own unit, as well as all the Venetians chased after the Cumans and Vlachs and directly into the Bulgarian ambush. Many names of knights who fought in the battle are mentioned: Emperor Baldwin I, Louis I, Count of Blois, Bishop Peter of Bethlehem, Stephen of Perche, Reno of Mentimirel, Robert of Ronsoa, Ustas of Umont, Count Jerar of Lombardy, Jan of Mazerol and others. According to the same historian, the entirety of the Venetian forces takes part in the battle, being led by Doge Enrico Dandolo himself.

=== Forces of Adrianople and Thrace ===
Although they do not take part in the battle itself, all of the Byzantine rebels from East Thrace had gathered at Adrianopole and stood bravely to defend its wall from the conquerors. Their numbers are unknown.

== Battle ==
The battle was fought for two days, one week after the Orthodox Easter celebration.

=== First day, 13 April 1205 ===
On 13 April Kaloyan sent the Cuman cavalry to scout and to make a "test attack" against the knights. The Cumans landed a surprise attack on Emperor Baldwin I, then pretended to flee from the knights' skillful counter-attack. A long chase ensued, luring the knights out of their camps. At its conclusion the Cumans turned sharply around and began firing arrows at the stampeding enemy, killing many people and war horses. Realizing their own foolishness, the knights decided to stand their ground and wait for the attack of the Bulgarians. Baldwin made the decision to wait for all of the remaining knights and soldiers to gather and prepare for a proper battle, which would take place after the upcoming Easter celebrations.

During the preparation for the ambush, the Bulgarians dug trous de loup or "wolf pits", in order to create obstacles for the movement and battle formation of the heavy cavalry knights. Kaloyan placed the infantry first in the ambush with the heavy cavalry in reserve, ready to intervene if the foot soldiers began to give in to the Latins. The light Cuman cavalry was given the order to lead the knights to the trap.

The same night Baldwin called a meeting with all of the present barons and leaders of the Fourth Crusade. They decided that, in the case of a new attack by the Cumans, the army must not follow, instead making a battle line formation in front of the camp.

=== Second day, 14 April 1205 ===
On Thursday, 14 April 1205, during the celebration of Catholic Easter, the Cuman light cavalry made a sweeping attack on the camp of the knights with arrows, loud yells and ringing of steel. Outraged by this sacrilege, the knights armed, mounted, and got into battle formation. Count Louis I of Blois disregarded the plan made the night before and led his unit after the Cumans, and the other soldiers, already blinded by anger, followed his lead. The Cuman cavalry outpaced the Latins, and was obliged several times to stop and wait for the enemy to catch up, after which they had a mock fight and fled again. This lasted until they reached the ambush, located in a ravine among hills.

On the far side of the wolf pits the Cumans turned around, apparently offering a serious fight. The knights charged in with their characteristic formation, but were checked when many horses and riders fell into the pits. In the ensuing turmoil the Bulgarian infantry emerged from ambush and completely surrounded the knights. Baldwin soon arrived with the rest of the 200 knights, but was unable to break through the encirclement and free Count Louis. Seeing this, Kaloyan attacked and surrounded Baldwin with his heavy cavalry, isolating the Latins in two small groups. Bulgarian soldiers used ropes and hooked polearms to unhorse the knights, who were then finished off with swords, hammers and axes. Despite their broken formation and inability to coordinate, the surrounded Latins put up a hard fight which lasted until late in the evening. At its conclusion the main part of the Latin army had been annihilated and Baldwin I captured. He was taken to Veliko Tarnovo and imprisoned at the top of a tower in the Tsarevets fortress.

== Aftermath ==
The capture of the supposedly impregnable city of Constantinople had added to the knights' aura of invincibility. News of Adrianople broke this illusion, and within a year the Latin Empire had declined.

=== End of Emperor Baldwin I ===
After his capture by the Bulgarians, the fate of Emperor Baldwin I was unknown to his subjects; his brother Henry of Flanders assumed regency in his absence. Whilst it is known that Baldwin died in captivity, the precise circumstances are unknown. Apparently treated at first as a valuable prisoner, he was later left to die in one of the towers of Tsarevets. There are many legends regarding his demise, the most famous being that he was condemned to death after trying to seduce Kaloyan's wife. The historian George Acropolites reports that the Tsar had Baldwin's skull made into a drinking cup, as had happened to Nikephoros I almost four hundred years before, but no evidence has been found to confirm this. Kaloyan informed both Pope Innocent III and Baldwin's court of the Emperor's death in prison. A tower of the Tsarevets fortress is still called Baldwin's Tower.

=== Kaloyan the Roman-slayer ===
Two years after the battle of Adrianople, Kaloyan set out to burn other Latin cities, but also the cities of Byzantine rebels, who had begun to conspire against him. Even though it was a bloody deed, the Byzantian historian George Akropolites gives the following pretentious explanation as to why the tsar gave the orders: "He was exacting revenge, as they say, for the evil, which Basil II did against the Bulgarians; and, as he said, as Basil dubbed himself the Bulgarian-slayer, he named himself the Roman-slayer..."
