= Renaud de Montmirail =

French nobleman, member of the Fourth Crusade

Renaud de Montmirail, born 1175, was a French noble who was a member of the Fourth Crusade and a prominent opponent of diverting it to attack Constantinople. He was a younger brother of Hervé IV of Donzy, Count of Nevers. Having reached the Holy Land, he came to Constantinople in 1204 after its conquest and died in 1205, in the Battle of Adrianople against Tsar Kaloyan of Bulgaria.
