= Francis Moore (barrister) =

16th c Under-Steward of Oxford, and MP

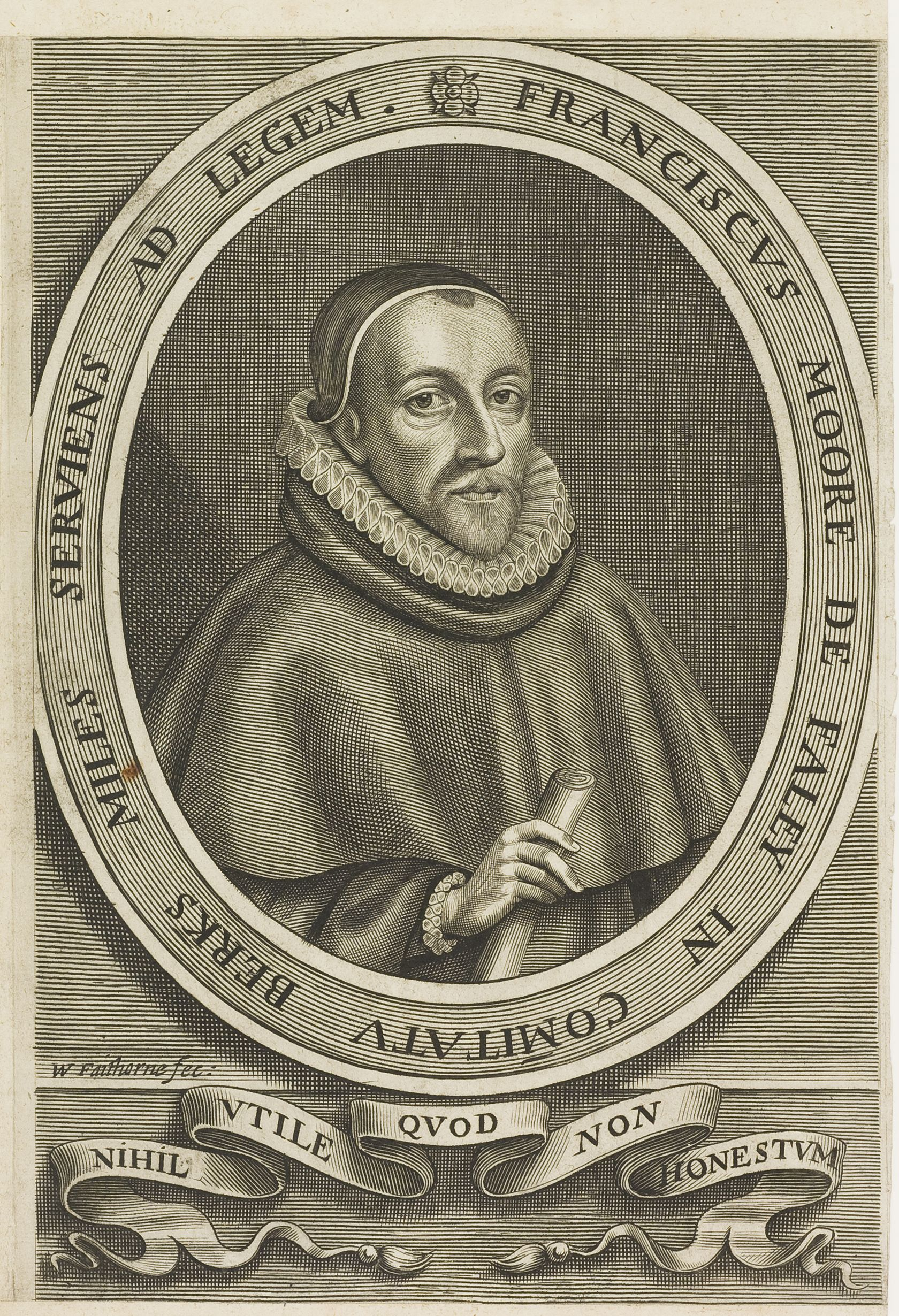
Francis Moore

Sir Francis Moore (1558 – 20 November 1621) was a Jacobean era barrister and Member of Parliament.

== Life ==
He was born the posthumous son of Edward Moore, a yeoman of East Ilsley in Berkshire and educated at Reading School and St John's College, Oxford.

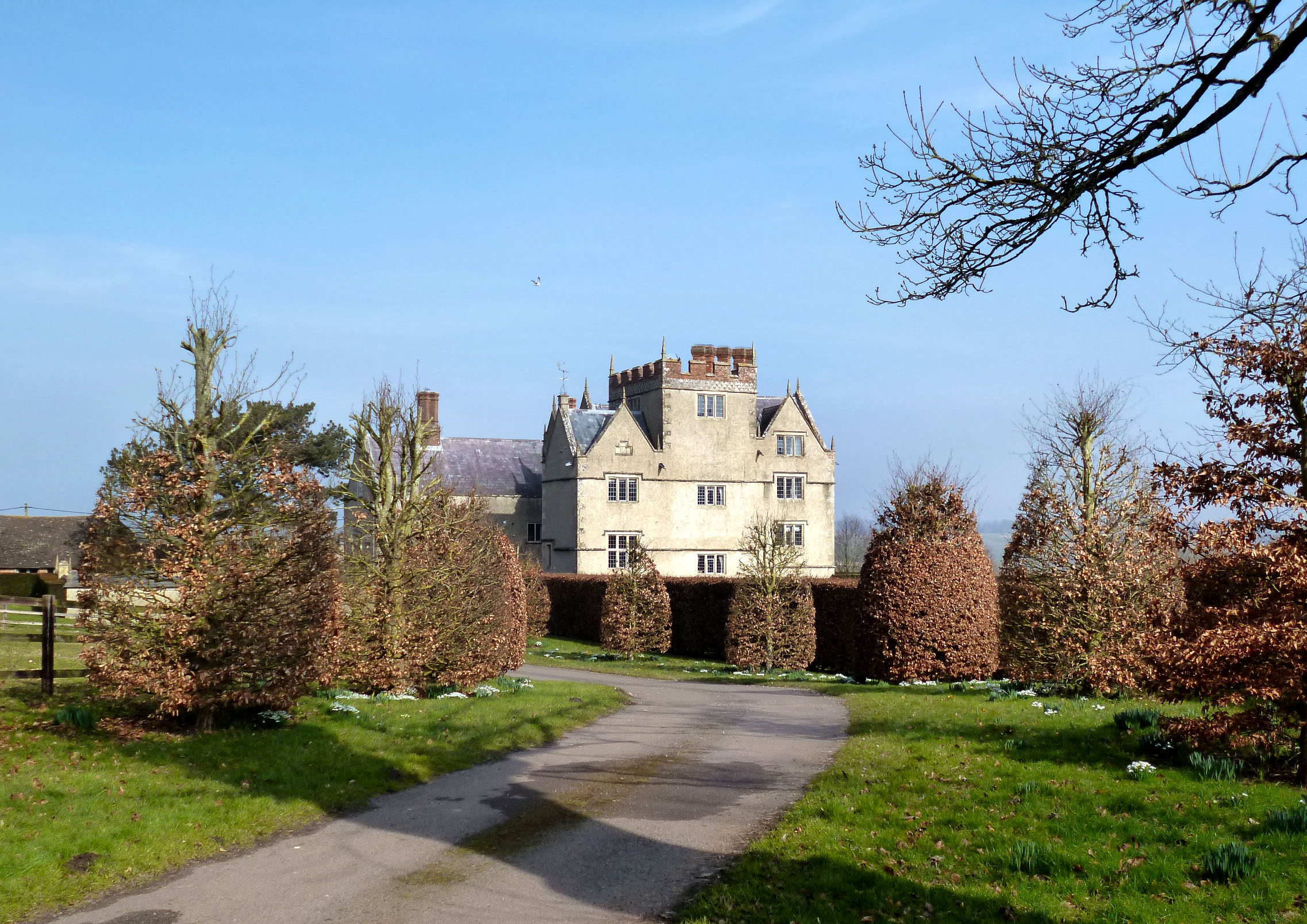
South Fawley Manor

He became an eminent barrister, working in the Middle Temple, but spent his family life at South Fawley Manor in Berkshire. Moore was appointed counsel and deputy steward to Oxford University, of which he was created M.A. on 30 Oct. 1612. In Parliament, he was a frequent speaker, and is supposed to have drawn the well-known statute of Charitable Uses which was passed in 1601. The conveyance known as lease and release was his invention which remains one of two main ways to extend a lease, each with financial and physical demise advantages and disadvantages. He became a serjeant-at-law in 1614.

He began the famous sheep market at East Ilsley and was Member of Parliament for Boroughbridge, Yorkshire in 1589 and then four times for local town of Reading (1597, 1601, 1604, 1614).

He was knighted in 1616, soon after being appointed Deputy Steward of Oxford University. Sir Francis had several legal reference works published. He was Custos Rotulorum of Berkshire from 1615 to his death.

Moore died on 20 November 1621, and was buried at Great Fawley, Berkshire.

== Family ==
He had married Anne, the daughter of William Twitty of Boreham, Essex; they had three sons and two daughters. His eldest surviving son, Henry, was made a baronet on 21 May 1627.

Political offices
Preceded by Sir Henry Neville	Custos Rotulorum of Berkshire; 1615–1621	Succeeded by Richard Lovelace
