= Matilda of Saxony (1172-1209/10) =

German noble

Matilda of Saxony, or Richenza of Saxony (1172-13 January 1209/10) was the Countess of Perche followed by the title of Lady of Coucy from the German Welf dynasty. She was also the niece of Richard the Lionheart.

== Life ==
Matilda was the eldest child of the Duke of Saxony Henry the Lion and Matilda, daughter of King Henry II, and was named Richenza after her paternal grandmother by her father. When her father was expelled from the empire's territory, the family took refuge in England at the court of King Henry II where Richenza adopted the name of her mother Matilda. She remained there even after her parents returned to their home in the German empire. Several candidates were considered for Matilda's hand in marriage including the kings of Scotland and Hungary. After the death of her grandfather, King Henry II, in 1189, her uncle Richard the Lionheart arranged a marriage with Geoffrey of Perche, heir to a strategic manor in Normandy, and a crusader of the Third Crusade. Geoffrey returned from the Crusade and assumed charge of the estate, which was extended by additional manors in Suffolk, Essex, and Kent.

During the imprisonment of Richard the Lionheart, Geoffrey sided with John of England. After Richard was released in February 1194 in exchange for a large ransom, Geoffrey was temporarily imprisoned and his property was confiscated. Freedom came in the fall of 1195 and their property was returned. Geoffrey, along with his younger brother Stephen, answered the call to fight in the Fourth Crusade. While preparing for the expedition, Geoffrey suddenly fell ill and died. Matilda attended funeral services for Geoffrey at Chartres Cathedral and founded a Cistercian nunnery at Nogent-le-Rotrou at Geoffrey's request in commutation of his crusading vows.

She managed the estates in the name of her son Thomas and showed considerable political acumen managing to keep the English territory from her uncle, King John (Lackland). Two years later she married Enguerrand III of Coucy, a man with a family prone to brutality and violence but received a divorce instigated by King Philip II of France. This marriage produced no children. Matilda died in January 1209/1210 and after her death, King John of England confiscated the English estates.

== Marriage and children ==
Matilda married Geoffrey III, Count of Perche in 1189. They had:

- Thomas, c.1193
- Geoffrey
