= Thomas of Perche =

Count of Perche

Thomas (1195 – 20 May 1217), Count of Perche, was the son of Geoffrey III, Count of Perche, and Matilda of Saxony, daughter of Henry the Lion, Duke of Saxony and Bavaria, and Matilda of England. He died young.

Only seven when his father died, Thomas became Count of Perche under the regency of his mother and her new husband Enguerrand III, Lord of Coucy.

== Biography ==
In 1216, the English barons rebelled in the First Barons' War against King John Lackland, and offered the English crown to Louis VIII the Lion, later the King of France. The death of King John ended this arrangement and the crown went to Henry III, John's son. In the end, Louis VIII renounced the English crown, but in the interim fought the forces of William Marshal, 1st Earl of Pembroke. In the decisive Battle of Lincoln of 1217, Thomas, the commander of the French forces, was killed.

Thomas married Hélisende Rethel, daughter of Hugh II, Count of Rethel, and Felicitas, daughter of Simon of Broyes. This union produced no children. His widow remarried Garnier de Traînel, Seigneur de Marigny.

Following Thomas's death in 1217, King Philip II of France gained control of the castles of Moulins-la-Marche, Bonsmoulin, and Bellême, which had been contested since 1182. Thomas’s uncle William, who was also Bishop of Châlons, succeeded him as the Count of Perche.

== Notes ==
French nobility
Preceded by Geoffrey III	Count of Perche; 1202–1217	Succeeded by William II
