= St Gabriel's School =

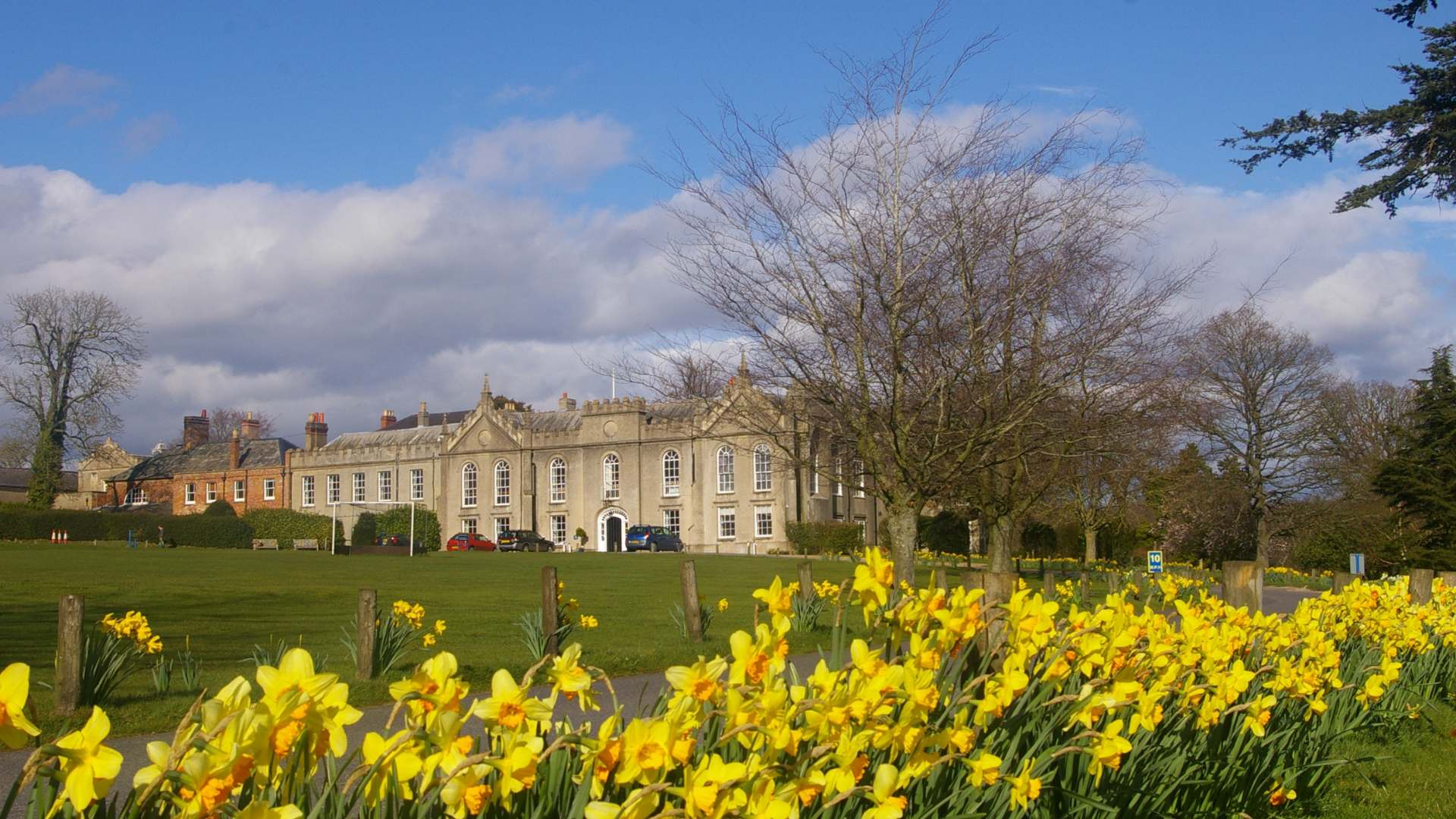
- Sandleford Priory (2018)

Location
- Sandleford Priory; Newbury, Berkshire, RG20 9BD; England; 51.3776°N 1.3166°W

Information
- Type: Private day school
- Religious affiliation: Church of England
- Established: 1929
- Local authority: West Berkshire
- Department for Education URN: 110128 Tables
- Chair of Governors: Nigel Garland
- Principal: Richard Smith
- Gender: Mixed
- Age: 6 months to 18
- Enrolment: 400+
- Houses: Bede , Chad , Alban , Aidan
- Colours: Navy and Royal Blue

St Gabriel's School is a private co-educational day school (Nursery, Junior School, Senior School & Sixth Form) located at Sandleford Priory in Sandleford, two miles (3 km) south of Newbury, in the English county of Berkshire.

== Pupils and Staff ==
In September 2022, St Gabriel's took boys into Year 7 of the Senior School. The Sixth Form, alongside Year 9, will accept boys from September 2024. This incremental approach will ensure a transition to a fully co-educational school in 2026. There are over 400 pupils. It is associated with traditional Church of England values.

== History ==
St Gabriel's School was founded in 1929 in Mill Hill in London. In 1939 the school was evacuated to West Ogwell Manor in Devon for the safety of the pupils and because their Mill Hill, London site was requisitioned. The school remained in the West Country until 1943 when it relocated to Ormonde House, Newbury. After Easter in 1948 the school moved to Sandleford Priory.

== Present building ==
The present Sandleford Priory is a Grade I listed building in 54 acres (22 ha) of parkland landscaped by Capability Brown. It was erected around the chapel of an old priory between 1780 and 1786 by James Wyatt, for Elizabeth Montagu, the social reformer, patron of the arts, salonist, literary critic and writer who helped organise and lead the Blue Stockings Society.
