= Angers Cathedral =

Roman Catholic church in Angers, France

Coordinates: 47°28′14″N 0°33′18″W

- Cathédrale Saint-Maurice d'Angers
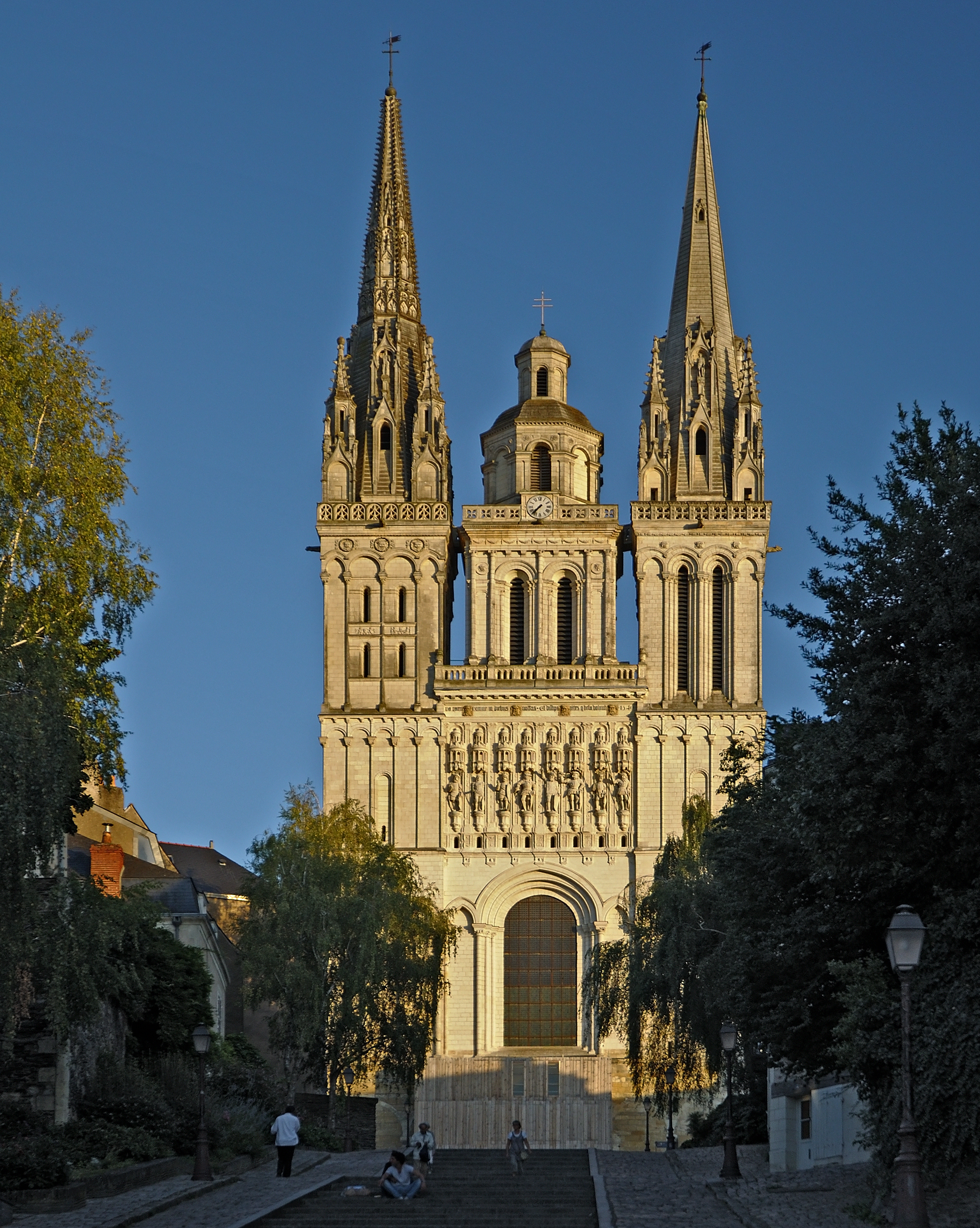
- West front of Angers Cathedral

Religion
- Affiliation: Roman Catholic
- Province: Diocese of Angers
- Rite: Roman
- Ecclesiastical or organisational status: Cathedral
- Leadership: Renaud de Martigné and Ulger
- Year consecrated: 1096
- Status: Active

Location
- Location: Angers, Maine-et-Loire, France
- Interactive map of Angers Cathedral

Architecture
- Architects: Etienne d'Azé, Jean Delespine (Towers) and Charles Joly-Leterme
- Type: Church
- Style: Romanesque, Gothic and Angevin Gothic
- General contractor: Normand de Doué and Guillaume de Beaumont
- Groundbreaking: 1032; 994 years ago
- Completed: 1523; 503 years ago

Specifications
- Direction of façade: West
- Length: 296.82 ft (90.47 m)
- Width: 75.45 ft (23.00 m)
- Width (nave): 53.74 ft (16.38 m)
- Height (max): 252.6 ft (77.0 m)
- Spire height: 229.6 and 252.6 ft (70.0 and 77.0 m)

Website
- http://catholique-angers.cef.fr/Cathedrale-Saint-Maurice-Notre-Dame

Angers Cathedral (French: Cathédrale Saint-Maurice d'Angers) is a Catholic church dedicated to Saint Maurice in Angers, France. It is the seat of the Bishops of Angers.

Built between the 11th and 16th centuries, it is known for its mixture of Romanesque and Gothic architecture, and its ornate Baroque altar and sculpture. It also has an extensive collection of stained-glass windows, including several elements from the late 12th century, one of the earliest uses of grisaille glass in combination with coloured glass, and two rose windows depicting the Last Judgement and the Apocalypse, unique in French renaissance stained-glass.

== History ==
=== The first cathedral ===
The earliest cathedral on the site was dedicated to the Virgin Mary but in 396 Saint Martin, the Archbishop of Tours, added the Theban legion Egyptian martyr Saint Maurice to the dedication. He had acquired a relic of some of the blood of the members of the Theban Legion, who were martyred with Saint Maurice in the 3rd century for converting to Christianity. The relic was brought to Tours and later, according to the legend, a phial of it was given to Angers.

In the 7th century, an additional devotion to Saint Maurilius, the Bishop of Angers in the 4th century, began. A biography of him was written and in 873 his body was transferred to the cathedral. For 200 years Saints Maurilius and Maurice were frequently mentioned together as the patron saints of the cathedral but gradually Saint Maurice became the primary patron.

=== The Romanesque to the Baroque cathedral ===
At the beginning of the 11th century, Hubert de Vendôme, the Bishop of Angers from 1010 to 1047, decided to build a new cathedral in the Romanesque style to replace the existing church. The new church was consecrated on 16 August 1025, but in 1032 it was ravaged by a fire.

Geoffroy de Tours, the Bishop of Angers from 1081 to 1093, ordered the reconstruction of the cathedral, which continued under the supervision of his successors, Renaud de Martigné (1102–1125), Ulger (1125–1148) and Normand de Doué (1148–1153). The altar crucifix was blessed in 1051 and the new altar was consecrated in 1096.

In the mid-12th century, the cathedral underwent another transformation. Atop the Romanesque lower walls new walls and vaults were constructed in the Angevin variation of Gothic architecture; which took its name from the historic province of Anjou, a fiefdom of the French crown. The vaults were composed of high crossing ribs, supported by rows of clustered columns and pillars in the nave below. This allowed the construction of very large windows on the upper walls between the ribs. filling the interior with light.

The rebuilding of the nave was followed by that of the choir and the new transept. This was carried out between 1235 and 1274, largely under the direction of Guillaume de Beaumont, the Bishop of Angers from 1203 to 1240. The choir followed a similar design as the nave, with the grand arches replaced by large blind arches topped with a narrow passageway, now decorated with a wrought-iron railing, below the large windows of the upper level. The arches are taller a more slender than those of the nave, and the decoration more stylised.

In the 17th century the interior of the church underwent another rebuilding; Angers Cathedral was one of the first in France to redesign its interior following the directives of the Council of Trent, to make the interior more welcoming and decorative for ordinary worshippers, and to remove the barriers between the clergy and the congregation. This was the arrival of Baroque architecture into churches. The jubé, or rood screen, which separated the clergy and congregation was removed, and the altar was moved from the center of the choir to a position closer to the congregation in the nave. The majestic new baldaquin over the altar, with columns of red marble supporting a great crown of filled with sculpture, was installed in 1757. The altar beneath faces both toward the clergy in the choir and the worshippers in the nave.

=== Renaissance and later additions ===
In the 16th century, the architect Jean Delespine constructed a new base to the two towers. The lower portio, in the new Renaissance style, was covered with sculpture depicting Saint Maurice and his seven knight-companions and their martyrdom. They also gave the central tower a Renaissance-style hexagonal crown, finished in 1515. Another Renaissance spire was built atop the south tower, completed in 1523. The deteriorating original sculptures were largely replaced with copies in 1909.

=== 19th and 20th century ===
In 1806, the mediaeval porch on the west front had to be demolished because of its dilapidated condition. Built in the Angevin Gothic style in front of the entrance gate, it had two levels. Four pointed arches are the only surviving vestiges of the original porch. In the mid-19th century, the Neo-Gothic pulpit was created by the Bishop Choyer, with the support of Eugène Viollet-le-Duc, who was overseeing multiple Gothic restoration projects in France.

Various reconstruction projects were developed in the 20th century but none of them went beyond the planning stage.

=== 21st century ===
The removal of the mediaeval porch in 1806 illustrated its importance, as the fragile sculpture on the now bare facade started deteriorating and eroding rapidly. To protect these carvings and statues, a new porch was constructed on the cathedral in the 2020s, designed by Japanese architect Kengo Kuma and officially opened in April 2026. Kuma sought to create "a harmonious dialogue" with the structure of the cathedral, however, the €5.5 million project was met with mixed reactions, with the town reportedly torn between labeling the addition as a "jewel or a wart".

== Design ==
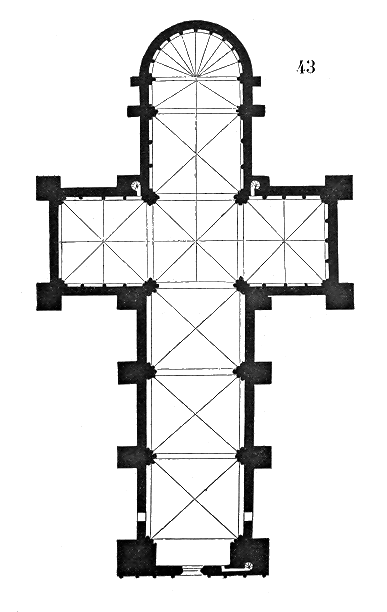
Plan of Angers Cathedral

The original Romanesque church was rebuilt with Gothic details in the mid-12th century. The single aisle was vaulted with pointed arches resting on a re-clad interior elevation. The nave consists of three simple bays, with single bays on either side of a crossing forming a transept, followed by a single-bay choir, backed by an apse.

== Dimensions ==
- Overall length: 296.818 feet (90.470 m)
- Width of the west front: 75.45 feet (23.00 m)
- Height of the vault of the nave: 81 feet (25 m)
- Width of the nave: 53.74 feet (16.38 m) (same as the Chartres Cathedral)
- Length of the nave: 157.48 feet (48.00 m)
- Height of the two spires: 229.6 and 252.6 feet (70.0 and 77.0 m)

== Exterior ==
=== The west front ===
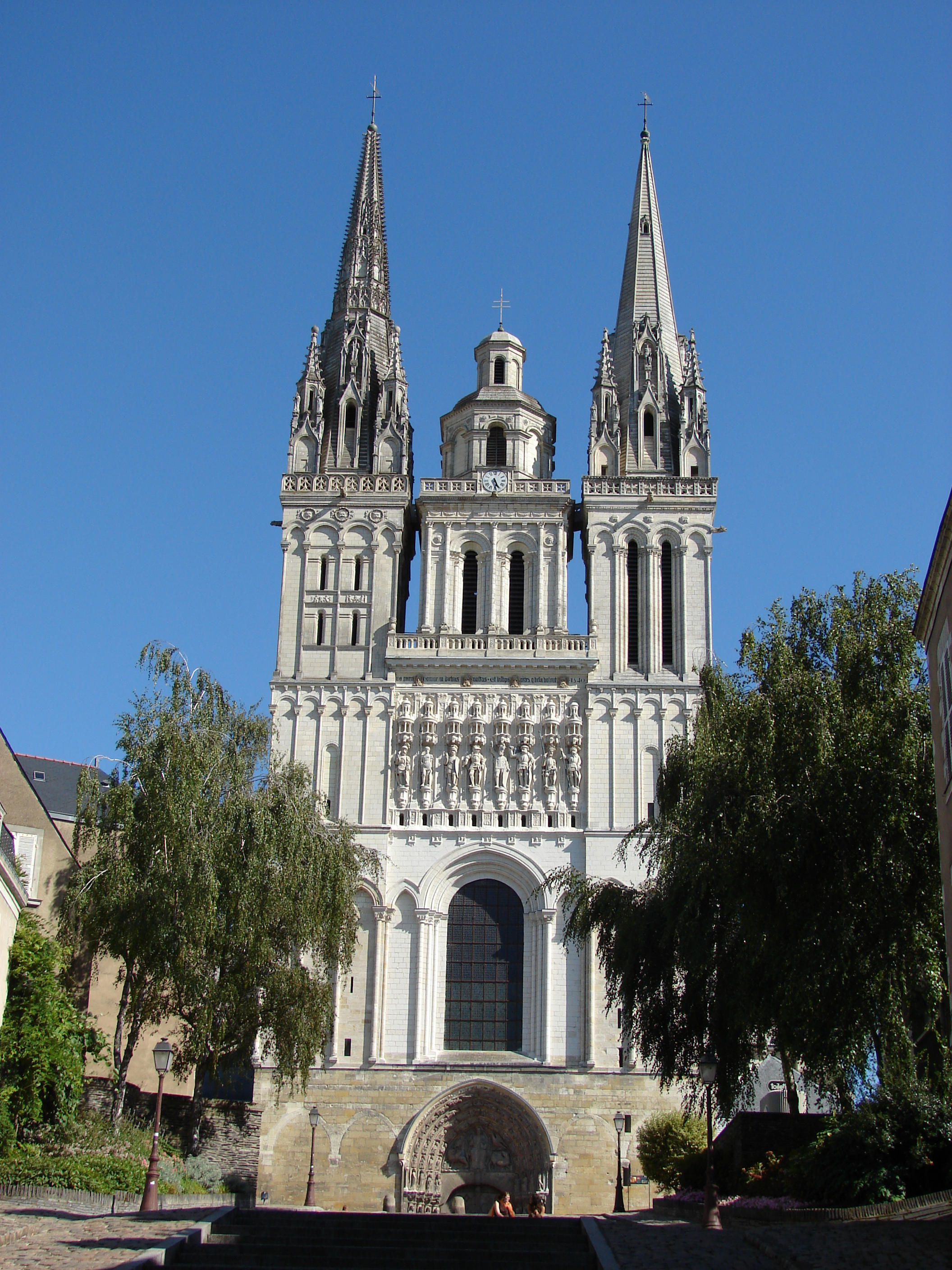
The west front - Three levels illustrate the Romanesque, Gothic and Renaissance

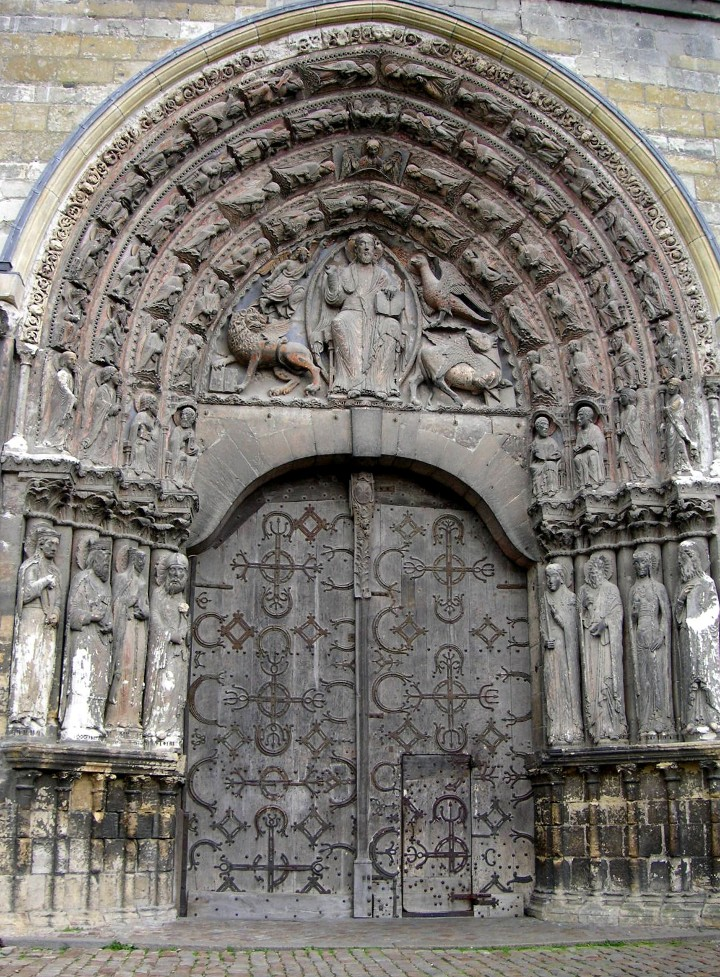
Romanesque portal of the west front

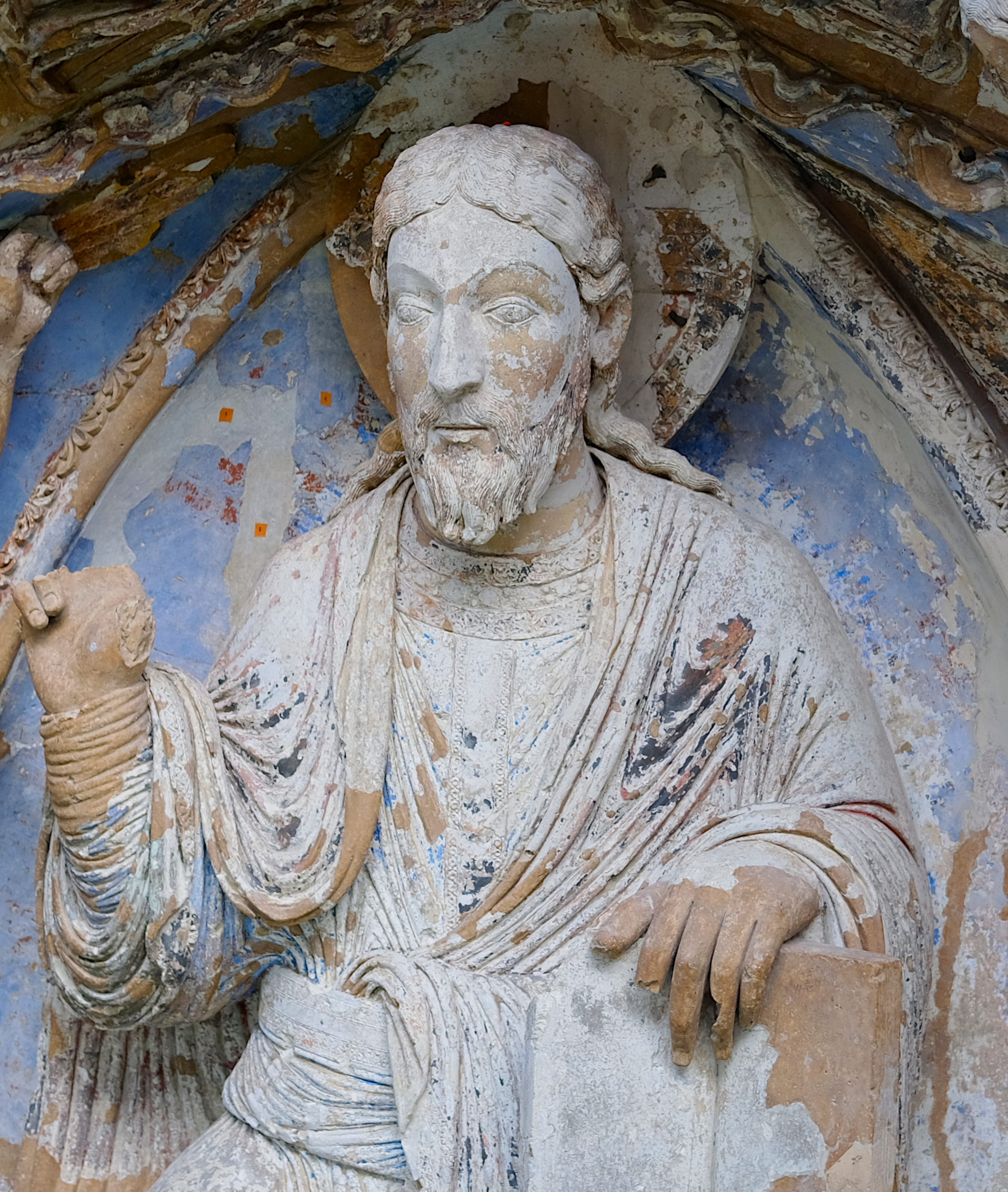
Detail of the tympanum, with traces of original colours

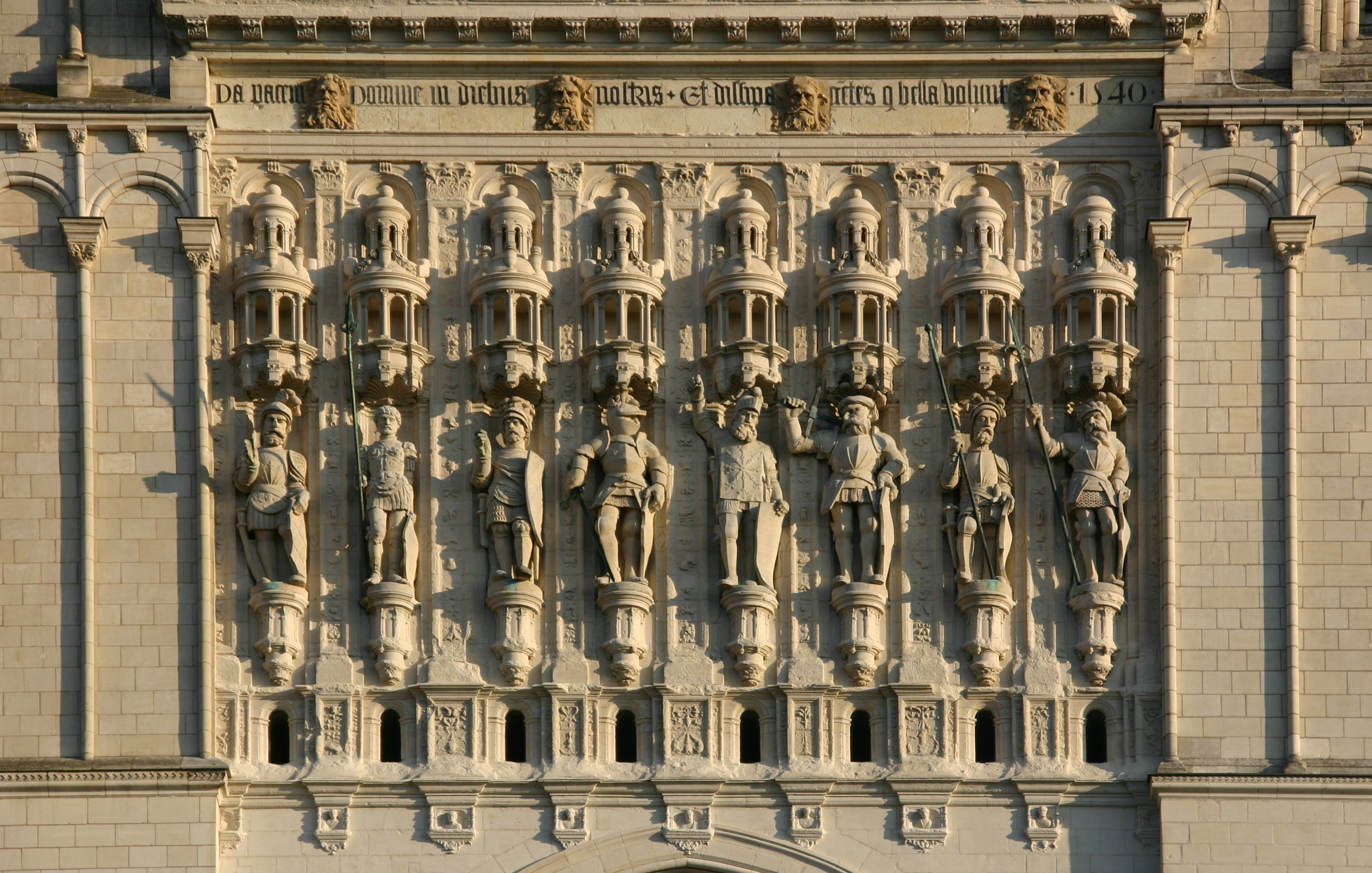
Detail of the west front- St. Maurice and his martyr-knights (1537; replaced with copies in 1909)

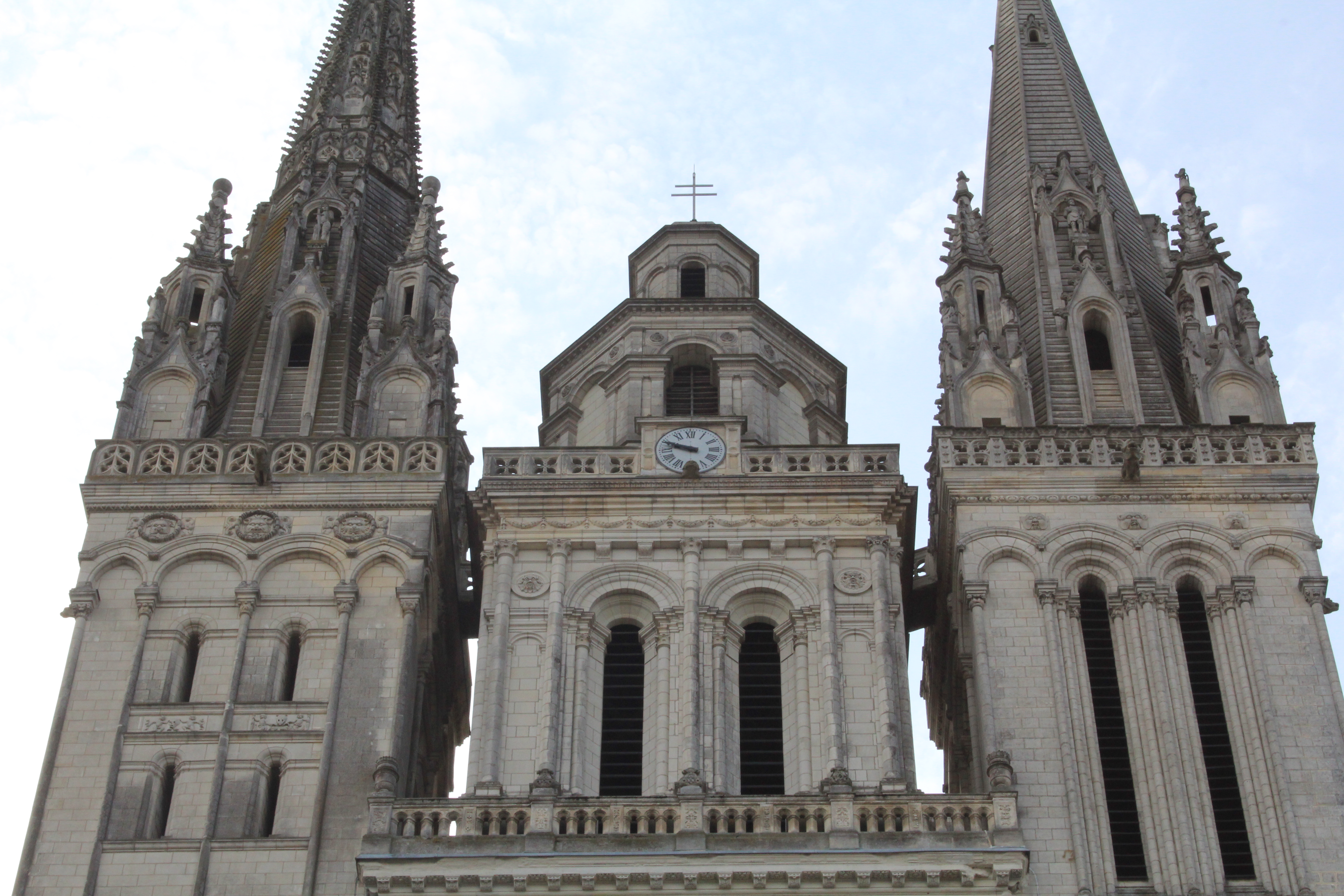
Upper levels of the three towers: Gothic left and right, Renaissance crown in centre (16th c.)

The west front clearly illustrates the three different periods of the construction of the cathedral. The lower portions are Romanesque, with thick walls, rounded arches, and a Romanesque portal and a central window. The towers on either side are Flamboyant Gothic, with rich decoration and a delicate dissymmetry. The central tower is a work of Renaissance architecture, with classical influences, built between 1533 and 1537.

The portal, much damaged and restored over the centuries, originally was protected by a porch. The tympanum over the doorway represents Christ in majesty, and it is decorated with column-statues from the 12th century. The decorative ironwork on the doors dates to the Romanesque period. Above the portal is a later gallery of sculptures depicting eight knights, who represent the companions of Saint Maurice, who joined him in his martyrdom. It was added in the 16th century. The originals were replaced with copies in 1909.

== Interior ==
=== The nave ===
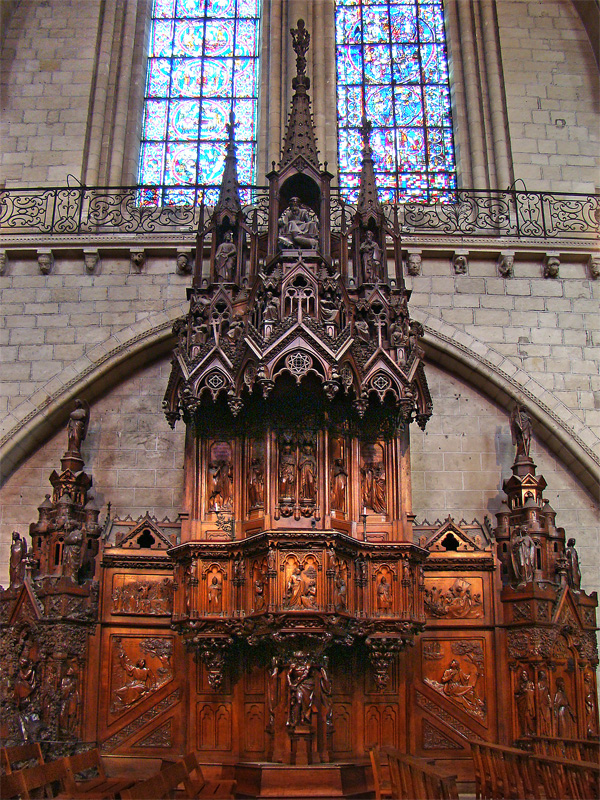
The pulpit in the nave

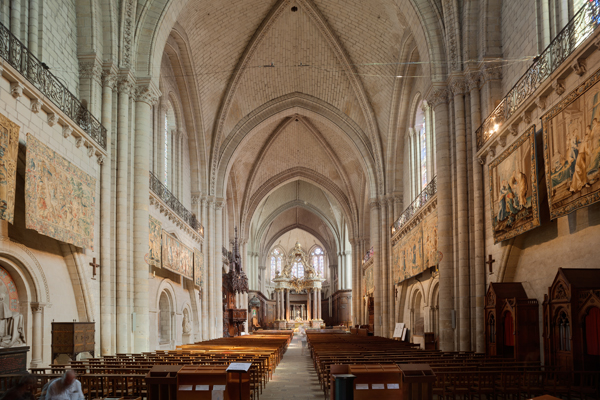
The nave and choir seen from inside the west front, showing the tapestries

The nave was constructed as a single vessel, without chapels. The current chapel on the south lower nave was originally a separate church for the parish, which was later attached to the cathedral. The lower walls are Romanesque, rebuilt in the early 11th century. In about 1150, a major rebuilding added the enormous arches between the supports of the Romanesque walls, up to the middle level of the walls. Then massive pillars of clustered columns were put in place supporting the arches of three large vaults. The space between ribs of the vaults on the upper walls was filled with very large stained glass windows, filling the interior with light.

=== The choir and transept ===
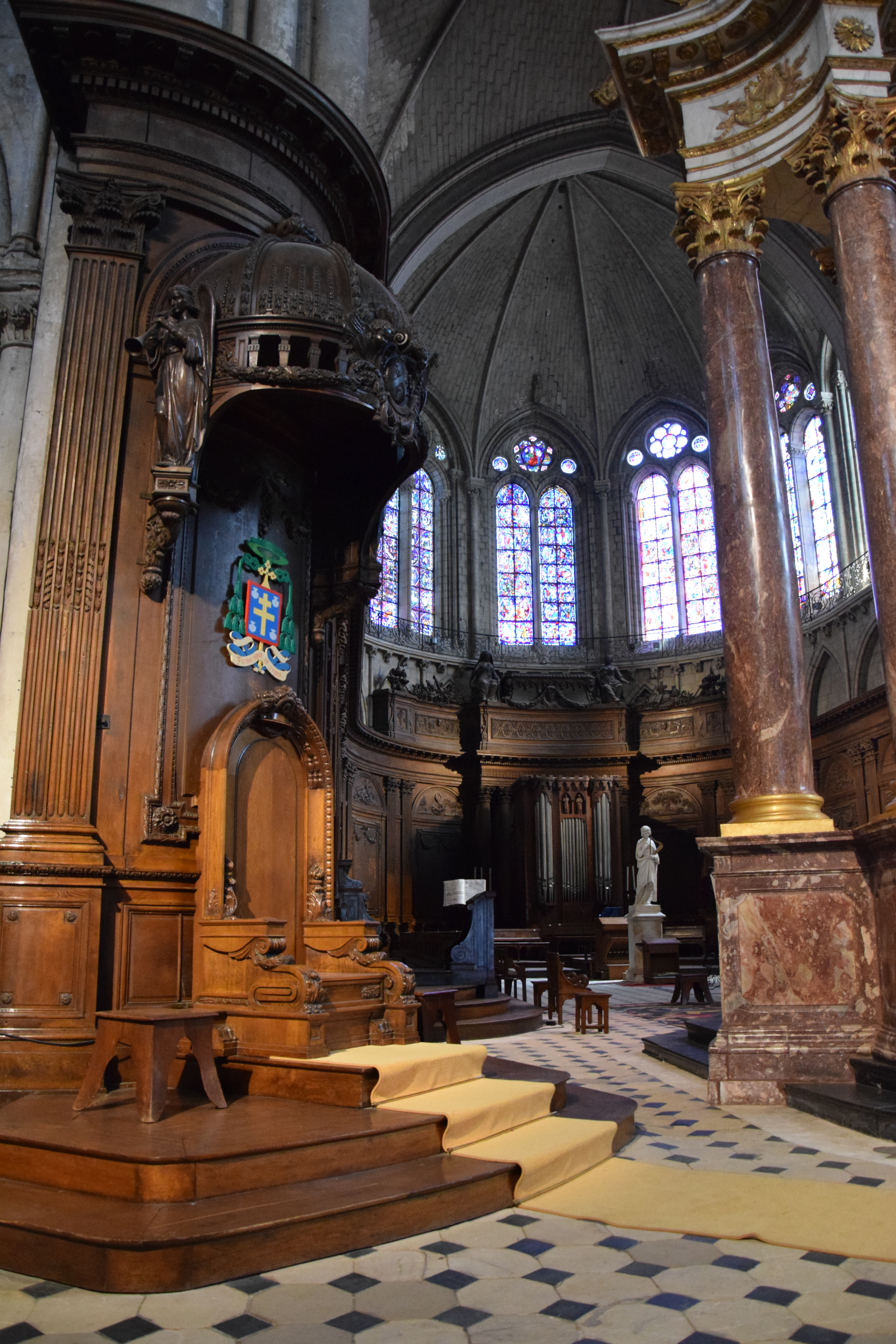
Bishop's seat and windows of the choir

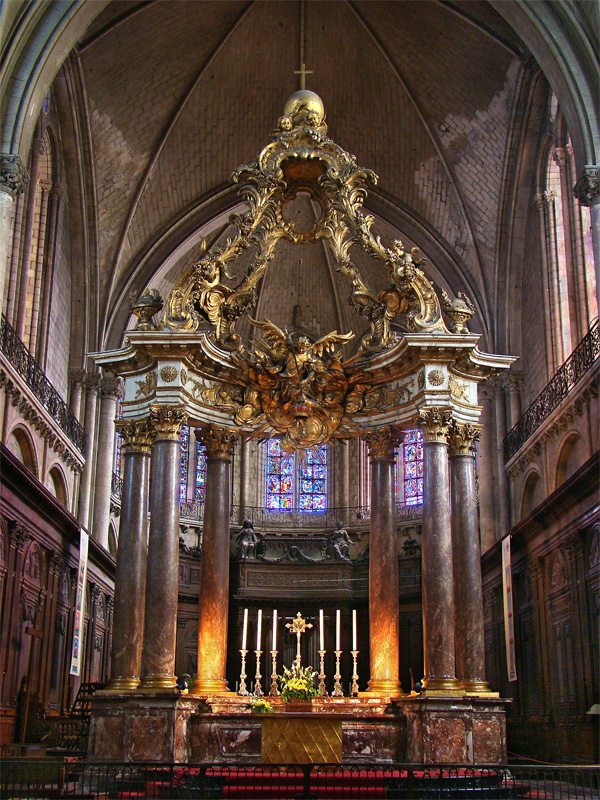
The baroque ciborium, or canopy, over the main altar

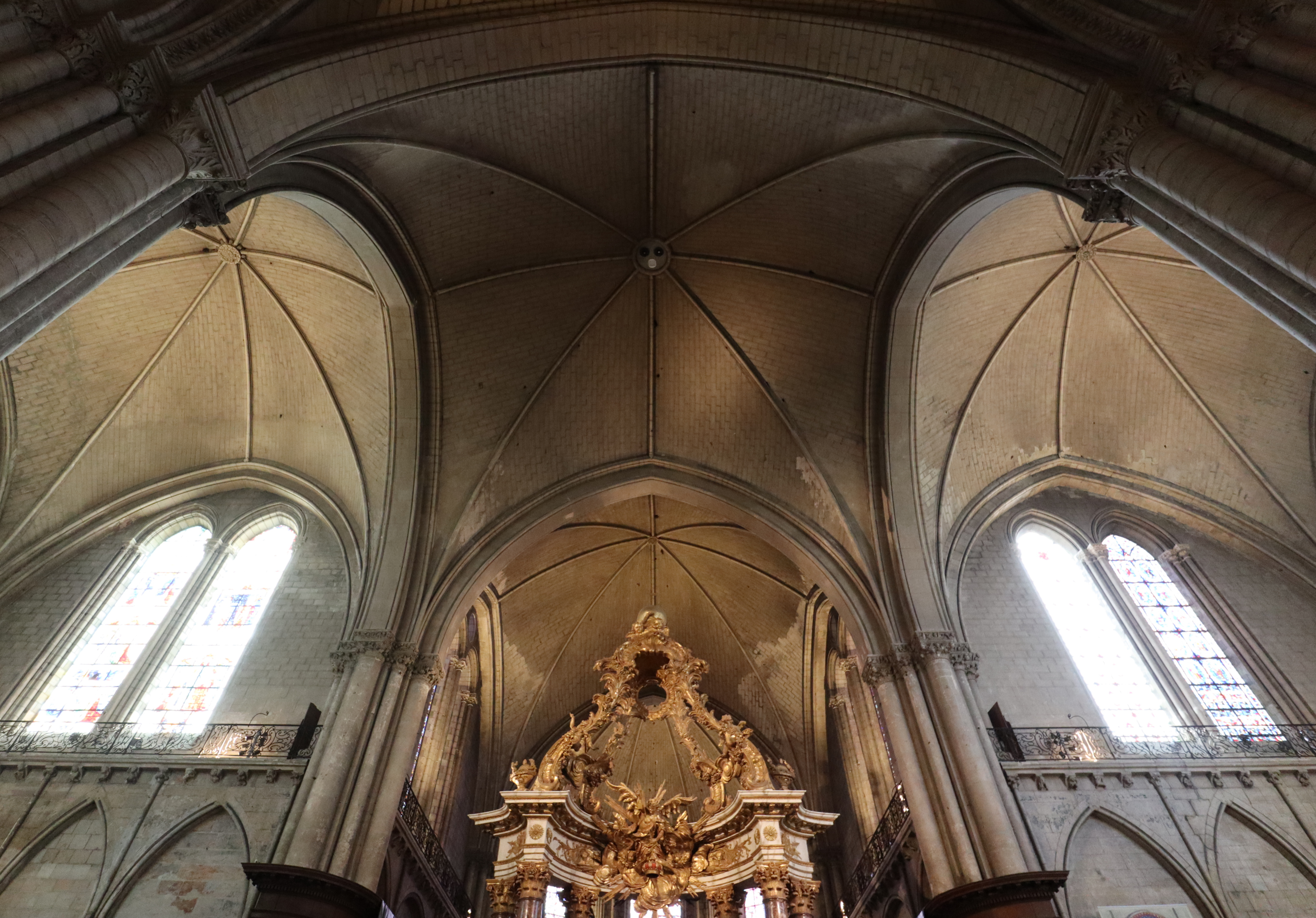
Vaults of the transept

The choir and transept were constructed after the nave, between 1235 and 1274. The walls and vaults were similar to those of the choir, except that the arcade of large pillars was replaced by blind arches, topped with a narrow passageway halfway up the wall, with a balustrade of cast iron.

The decoration of the choir is particularly notable. Angers was one of the first cathedrals in France to adapt the new Baroque style, imposed by the Vatican Council of Trent in order to make the altar more visible from the nave and to make the interior more dramatic and inspiring. The old rood screen that separated the choir from the nave was demolished, and the altar was placed between the two spaces. facing both. In 1757, the enormous Baroque ciborium or altar canopy, supported by columns of red marble and crowned with a pyramid of sculpture by Gervais was put into place.

== Art and decoration ==
=== Stained glass ===
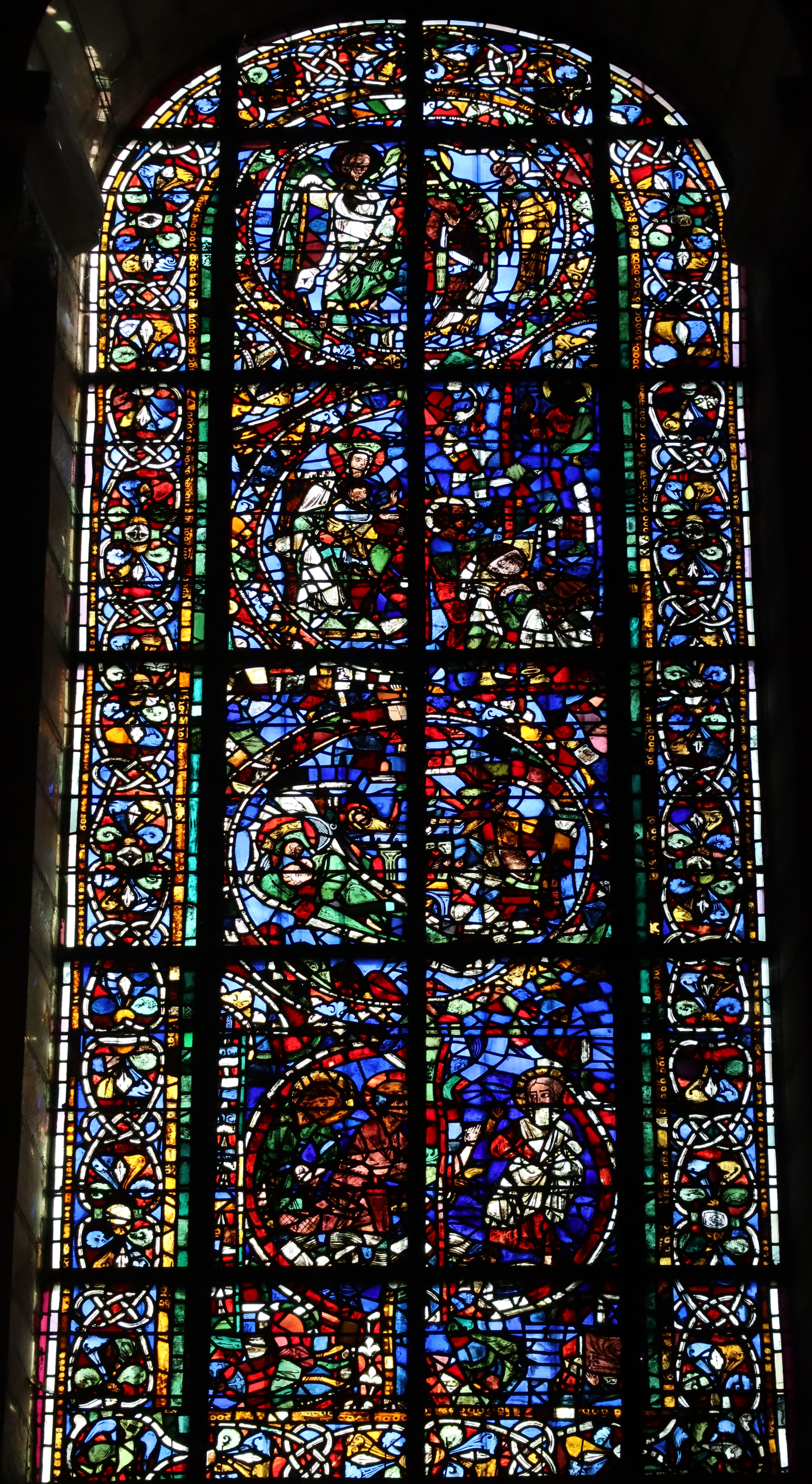
The Childhood of Christ (Bay 127) (1163-1177)

The window depicting the Childhood of Christ (Bay 127) contain the oldest glass in the cathedral. The three top panels were donated between 1163 and 1177 by the cantor Hugues de Semblançay. From top to bottom, they depict the Nativity, the Adoration of the Magi, and the Annunciation. The fourth and bottom panel depicts the calling of Saint Peter and Paul, and dates the cathedral's second major glazing campaign, between 1230 and 1235. This bottom piece probably finds its origin in a window dedicated to Saint Andrew. The whole window is in poor condition, among other reasons because it remained in place during the Second World War, and was partially blown out by a bomb in 1944.

At the end of the 12th century, under Bishop Raoul de Beaumont, new windows were made for the nave. Windows from this period depict the Martyrdom of Saint Catherine of Alexandria (Bay 125), the Glorification of the Virgin Mary (Bay 123) and the Martyrdom of Saint Andrew (Bay 119). Perhaps most important in all of Angers Cathedral is the window depicting the Virgin and the Child (Bay 127), which according to art historian Karine Boulanger displays "one of the earliest examples of stained glass presenting both a colored scene and a grisaille frame." Moreover, this window includes two medallions at the bottom, showing us two bishops, and likely donors of the windows (Guillaume de Beaumont and Raoul de Beaumont?) All were largely completed between 1190 and 1210, although all were edited and restored several times throughout the centuries.

A number of windows from the 13th century are found in the choir, including the life of Saint Andrew (Bay 119) and the life of Saint Peter (Bay 107a) whose stories were based on the apocryphal gospels, widespread at the time of creation. Some of these windows were commissioned by Bishop Guillaume de Beaumont, who rebuilt the entire choir of the cathedral after removing Angers' ancient city walls to create space. The apse also holds a window depicting Saint Thomas Becket, the archbishop of Canterbury, killed by King Henry II Plantagenet, who was also Count of Anjou. At the bottom of the window, Henry III the Young King submits to the authority of his father, Henry II, and refuses to speak to Thomas Becket, a scene "unique among the many cycles dedicated to the saint" (K. Boulanger).

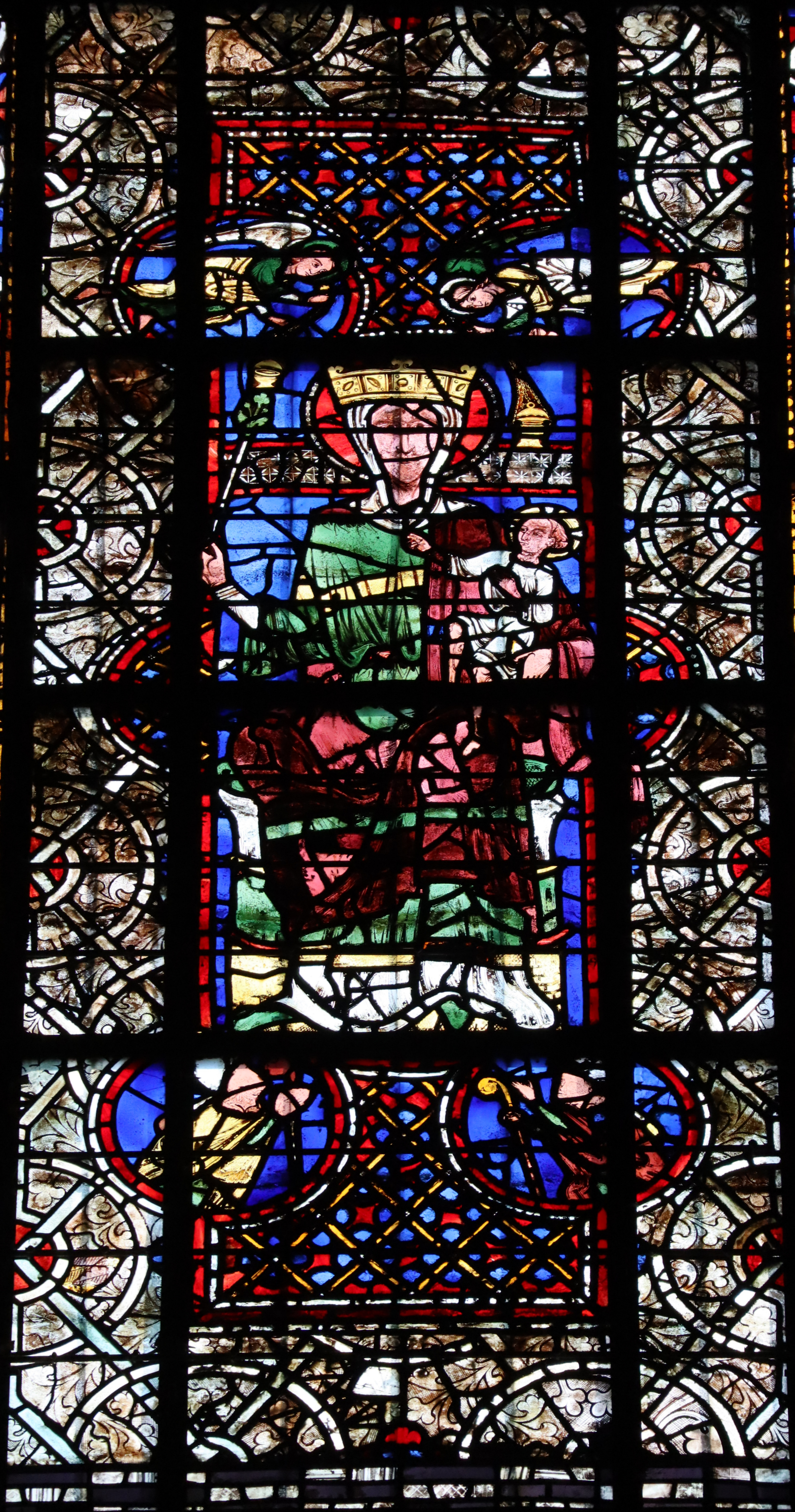
The Virgin in Majesty (1190-1226) (Bay 129)

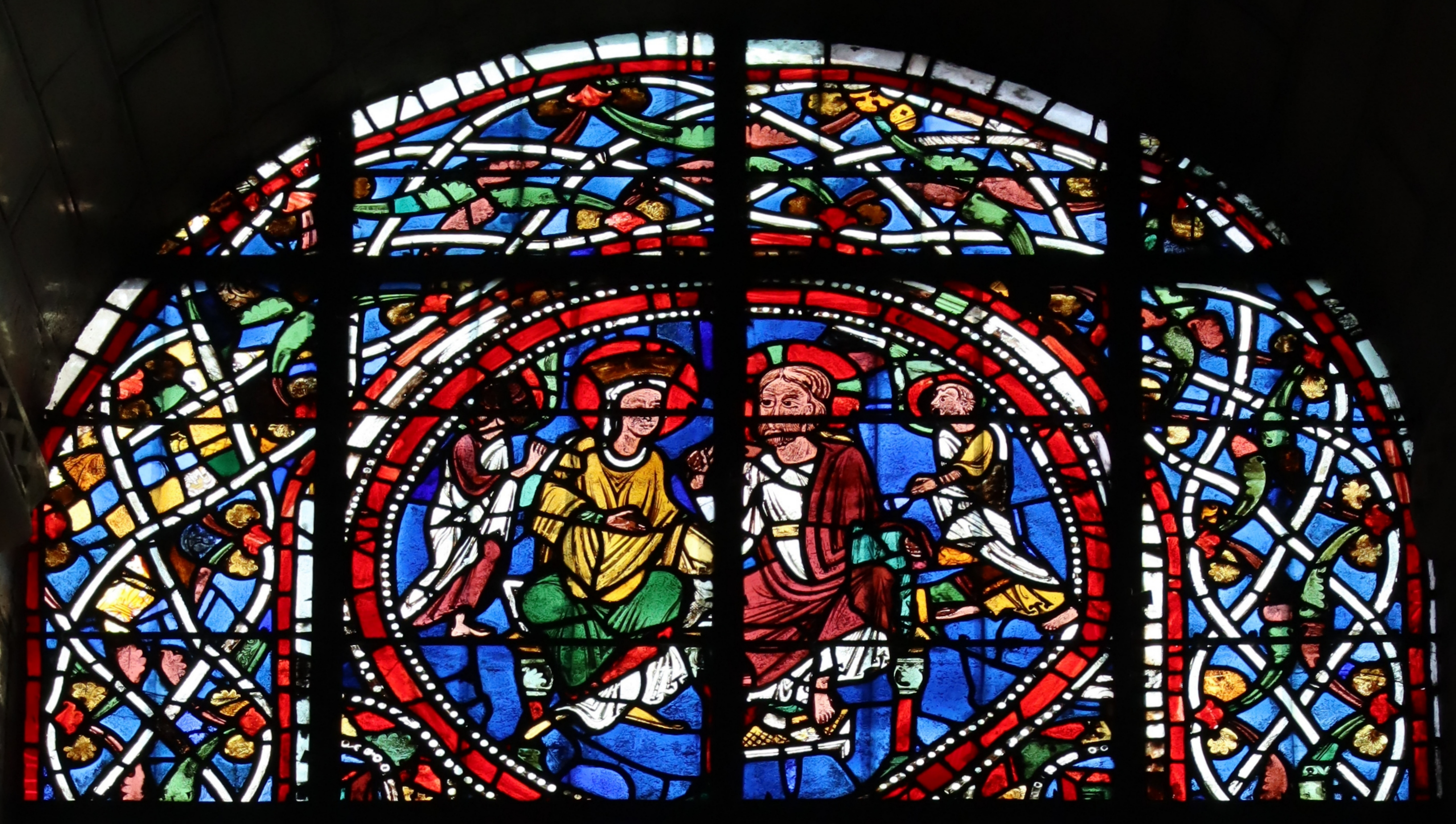
The crowning of the Virgin (1190-1226) (Bay 123)

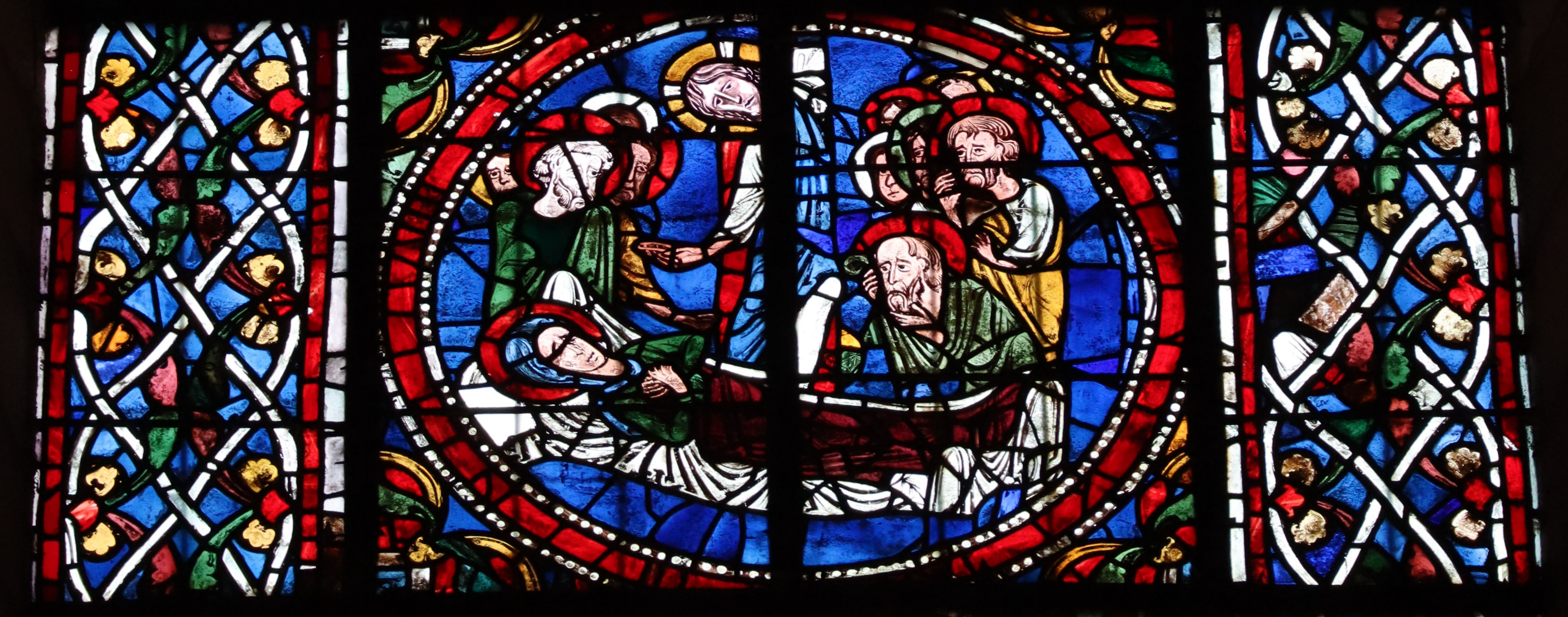
Dormition of the Virgin (1190-1226) (Bay 123)

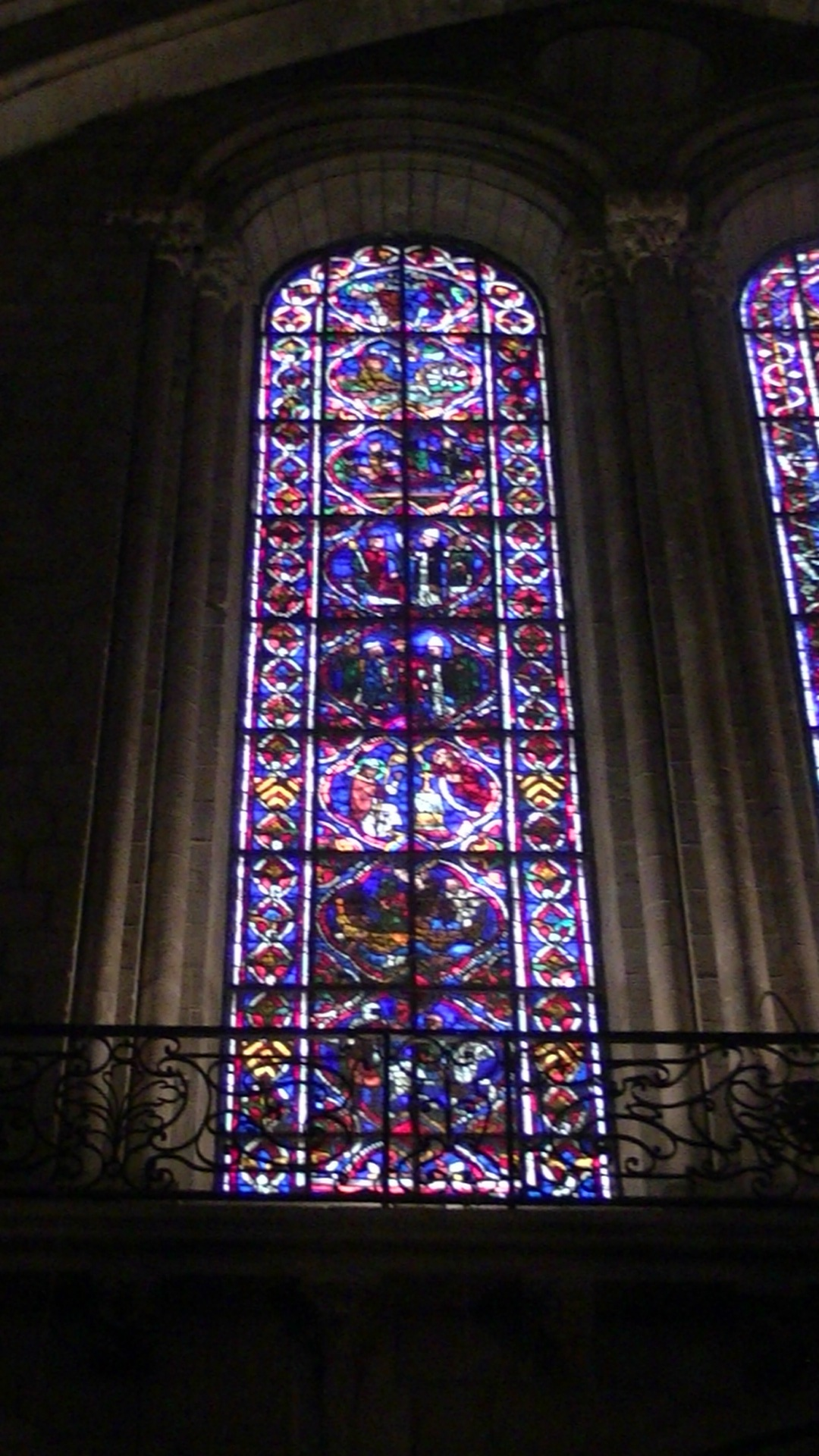
Thomas Becket Window, 13th c. (F-108 left in Choir)

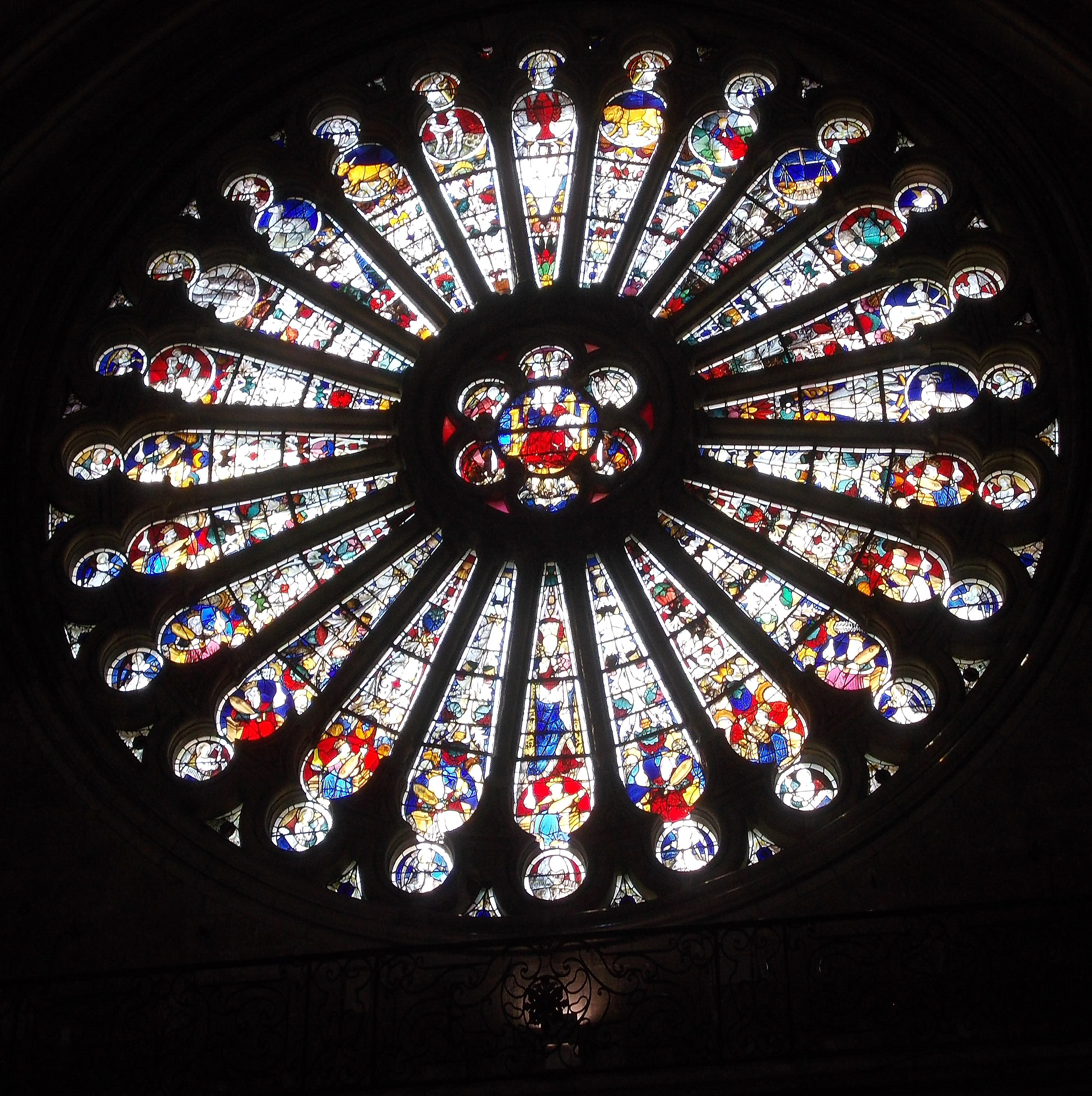
South rose window of Christ (centre) with elders (bottom half) and Zodiac (top half), by André Robin (1451)

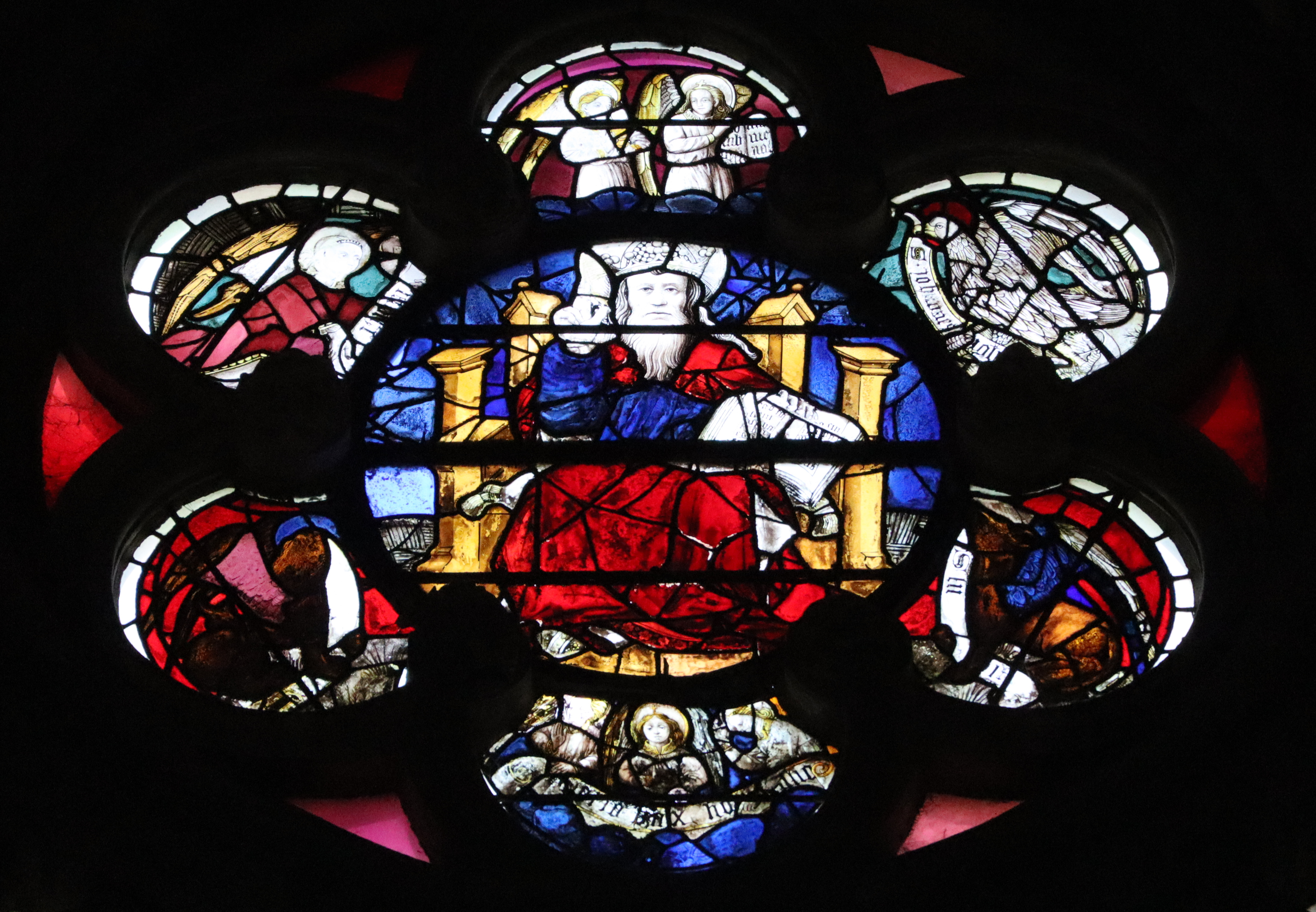
Center of the south rose window by André Robin (1451), depicting Christ in Majesty, surrounded by angels musicians, Old Men of the Apocalypse, and signs of the Zodiac

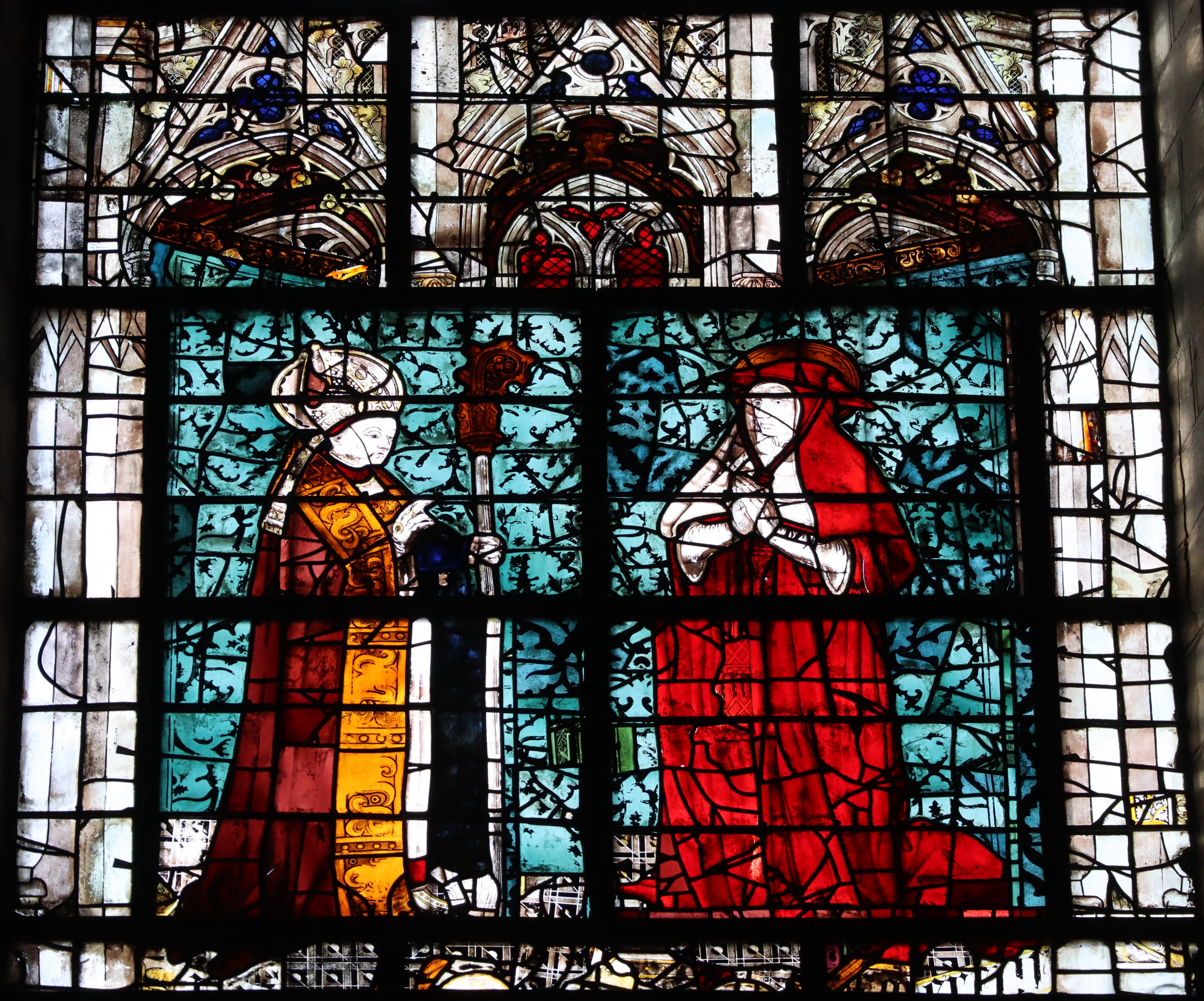
Saint-René et Saint-Cénéré. by Andréi Robin (1451–54) (Bay 109)

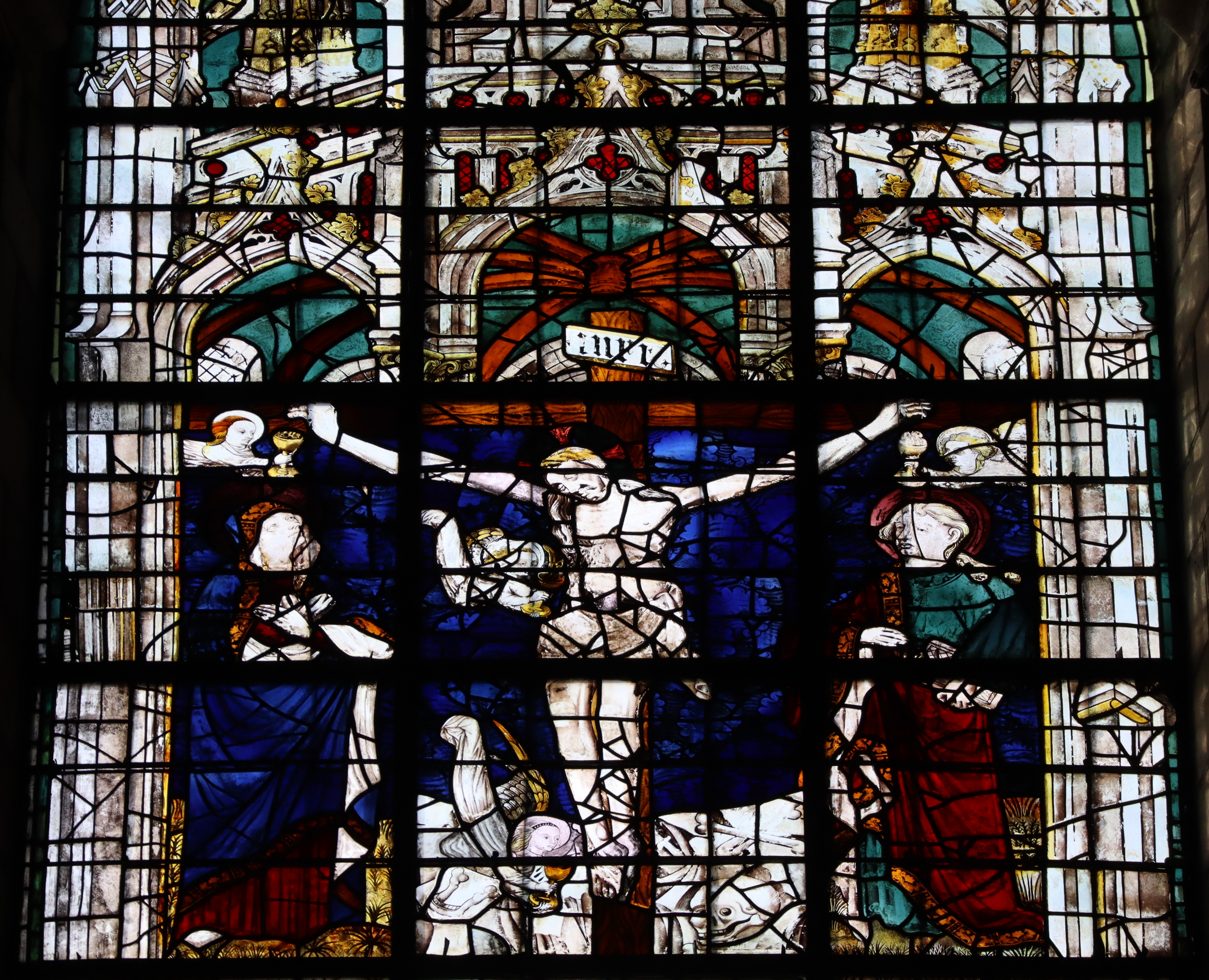
Calvary (Bay 111)

Following a fire in 1451, André Robin was commission to design new windows for the transept, plus two rose windows. Robin abandoned the medieval style, and instead created large figures of the Angevin episcopate, including many of the cathedral's bishops. These new windows were paid for by the many offerings brought in by Bishop Jean Michel, who had died in 1447. His tomb attracted pilgrims and had a reputation for miracles, allowing the cathedral to be restored. Robin also added eight Saints to the renaissance windows, including Saint Sebastian, Quentin, and Eustace, whose relics or altars feature inside the building. Notably, windows mabe by the same workshop also feature in the nearby Church of Saint-Serge, albeit with much better retained colours, undoubtedly due to the higher quality of glass.

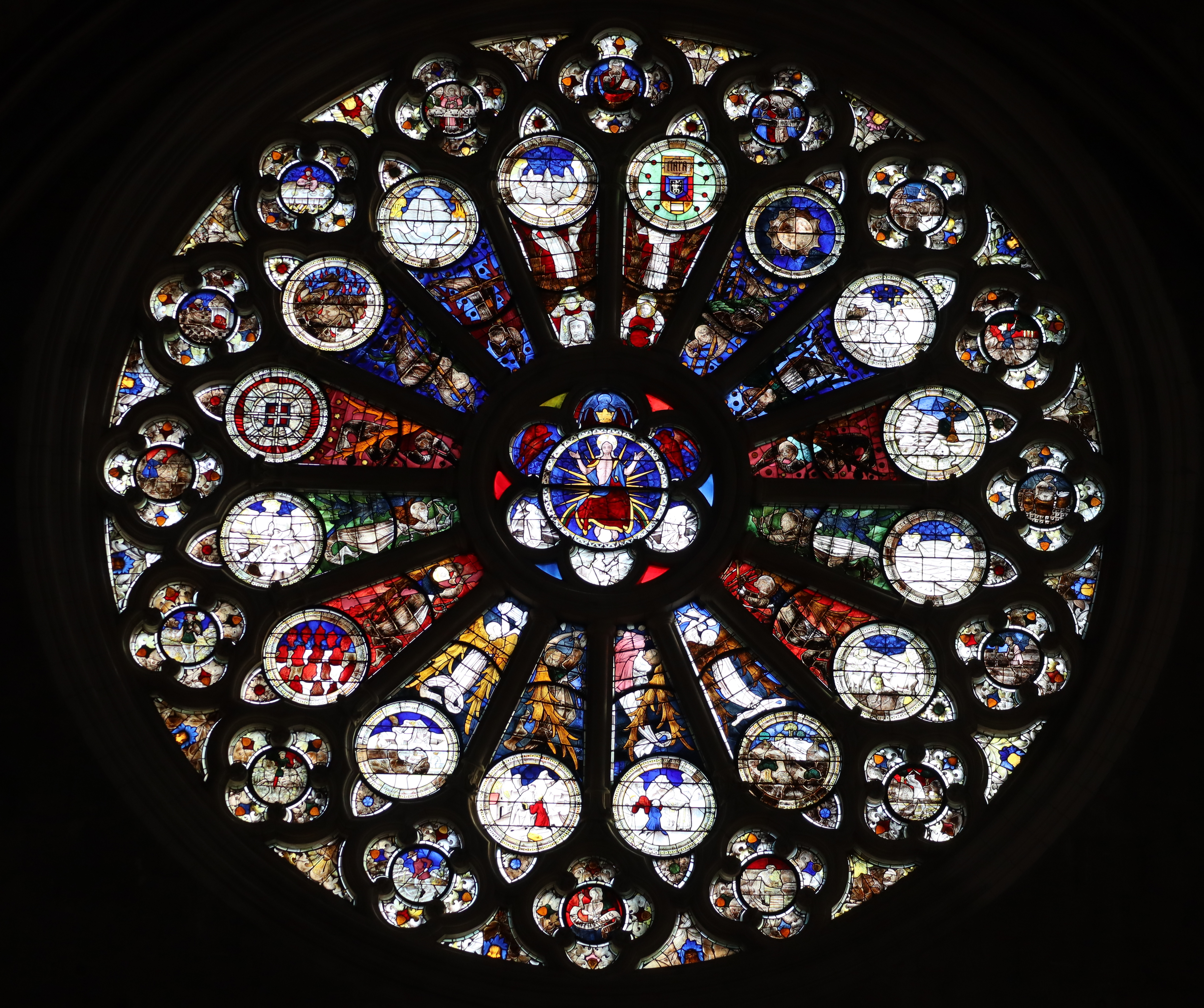
The North Rose Window (1451-1454)

The Robin workshop was also the creator of the two rose windows, stemming from 1451 to 1454, at the end of the Hundred Years' War and the beginning of the renaissance. The South rose depicts Christ enthroned and blessing, surrounded by the symbols of the Evangelists, the Signs of the Zodiac, the Virgin and Child, the Musical Kings, Angels and intricately worked foliage where lilies and thistles intertwine. In the perimeter we obtain a representation of the vision of the Apocalypse recounted by Saint John, where a procession of angels acclaims God. This complements the North rose, which depicts the Last Judgment and the signs foreshadowing the end times, a theme quite popular in illustrated manuscripts, but quite rare in stained glass. André Robin remained partly faithful to the iconography of the original rose window, that of the 13th century, which was destroyed by the abovementioned 15th century fire. The upper medallions contain signs foreshadowing the end times. Karine Boulanger states that their presence in a 15th-century French stained-glass window is exceptional . They take the form of mineral landscapes with rocks, but also groves and forests.

Today, the apse also contains several beautiful Renaissance stained-glass windows dating from the mid-16th century. They come from the priory of the Château du Verger, destroyed in 1776, and were installed in Saint-Maurice Cathedral in 1811.

By the end of the 19th century many of the early windows had been destroyed. Other early windows in the nave were destroyed by a bomb in 1944. They were restored in the 1950s by the Paris glassmaker and painter Jacques Le Chevallier. The new windows depict the saints particularly venerated in the Angers diocese.

=== Wood carving – the pulpit ===
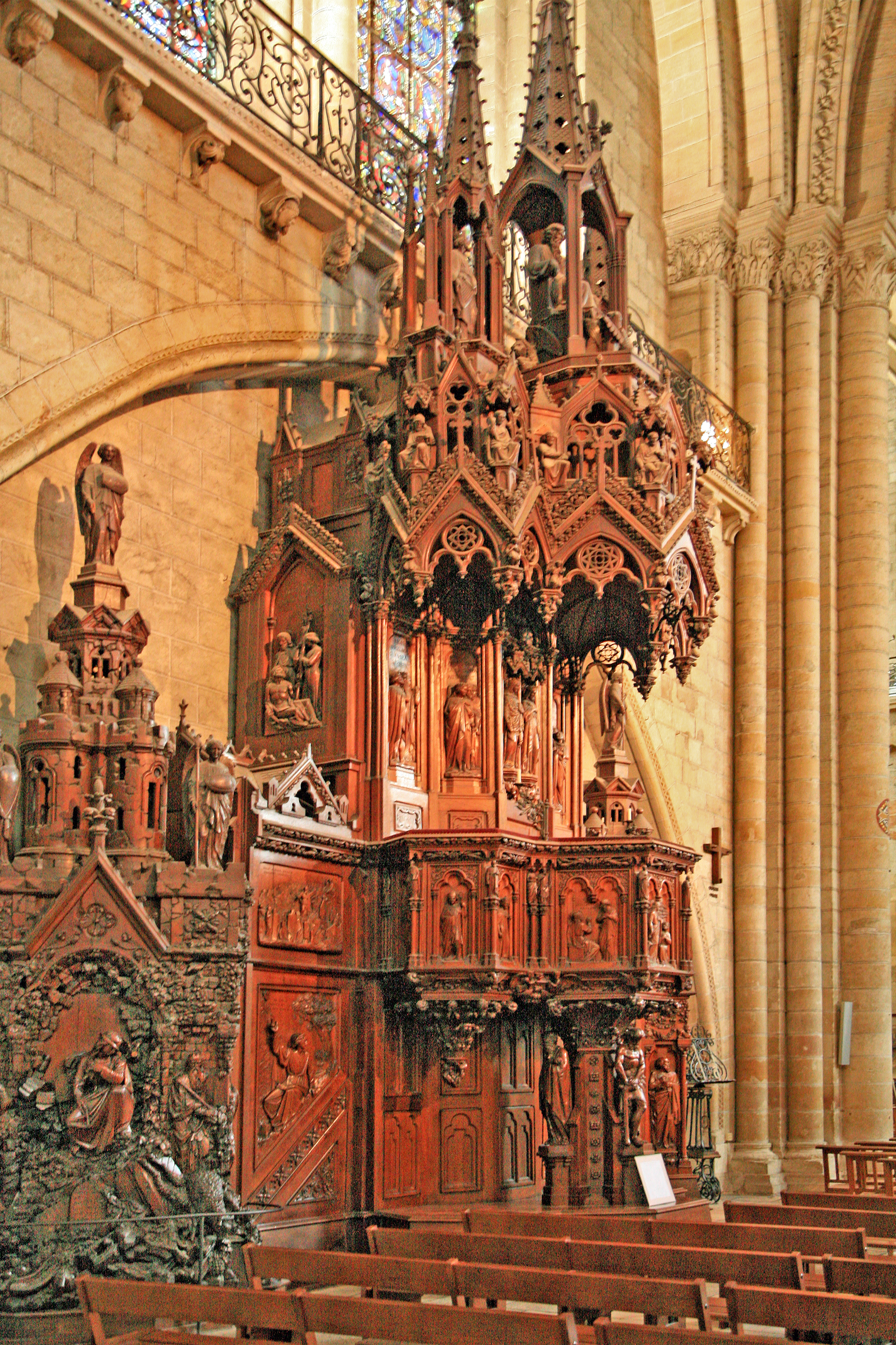
The pulpit in the nave

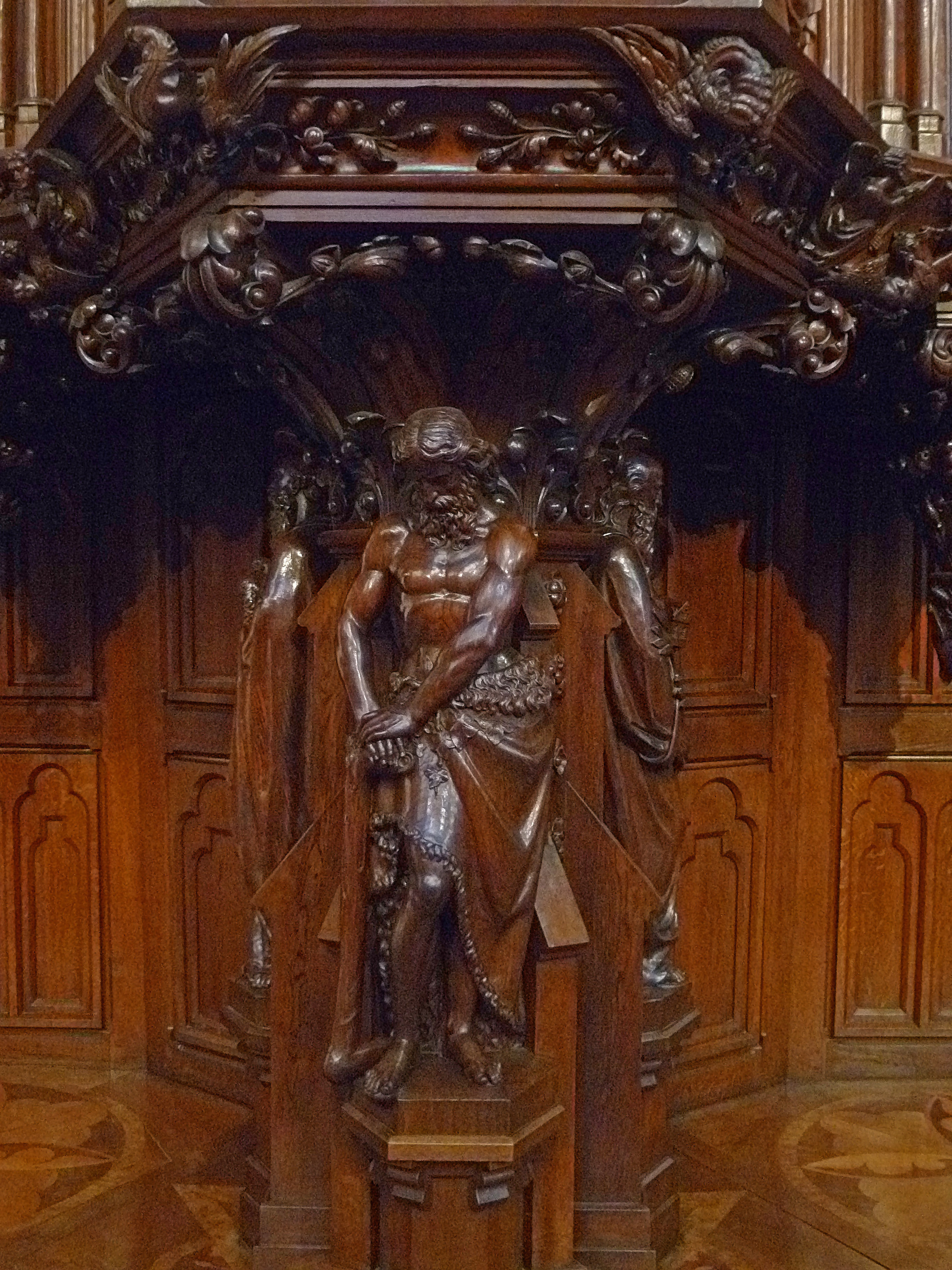
The sculpture of Adam supporting the pulpit

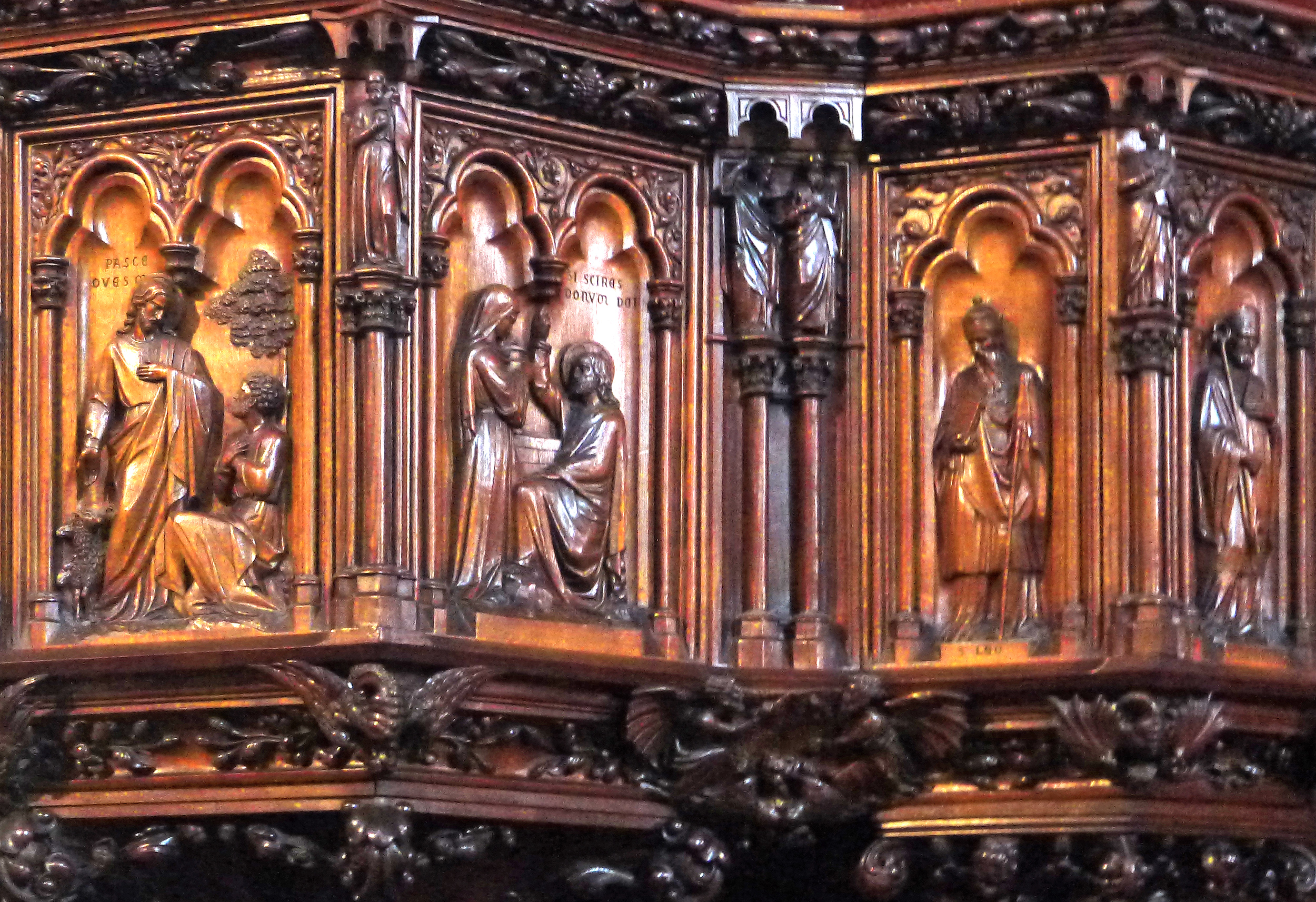
carved decoration of the pulpit

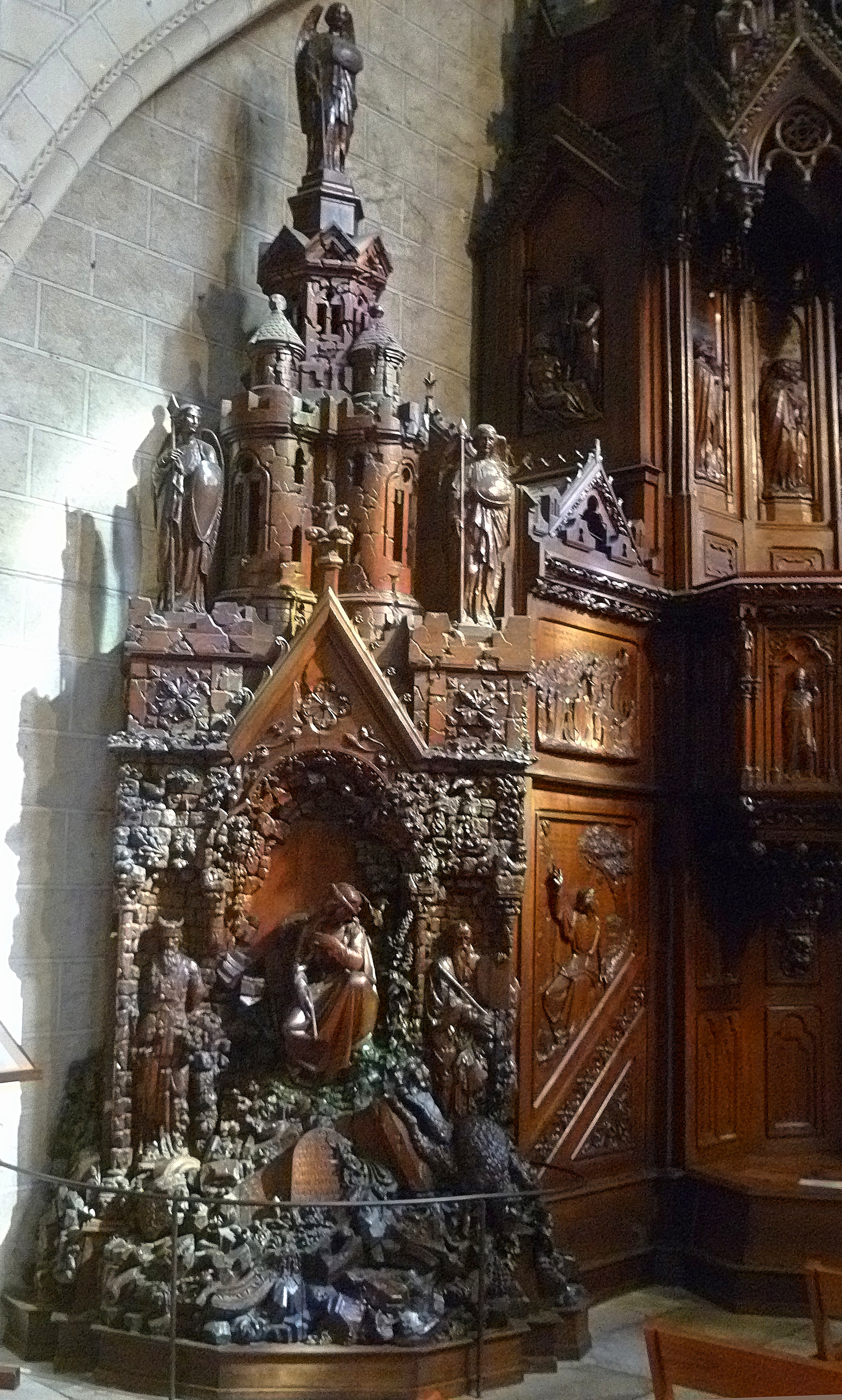
Detail of carving of the pulpit

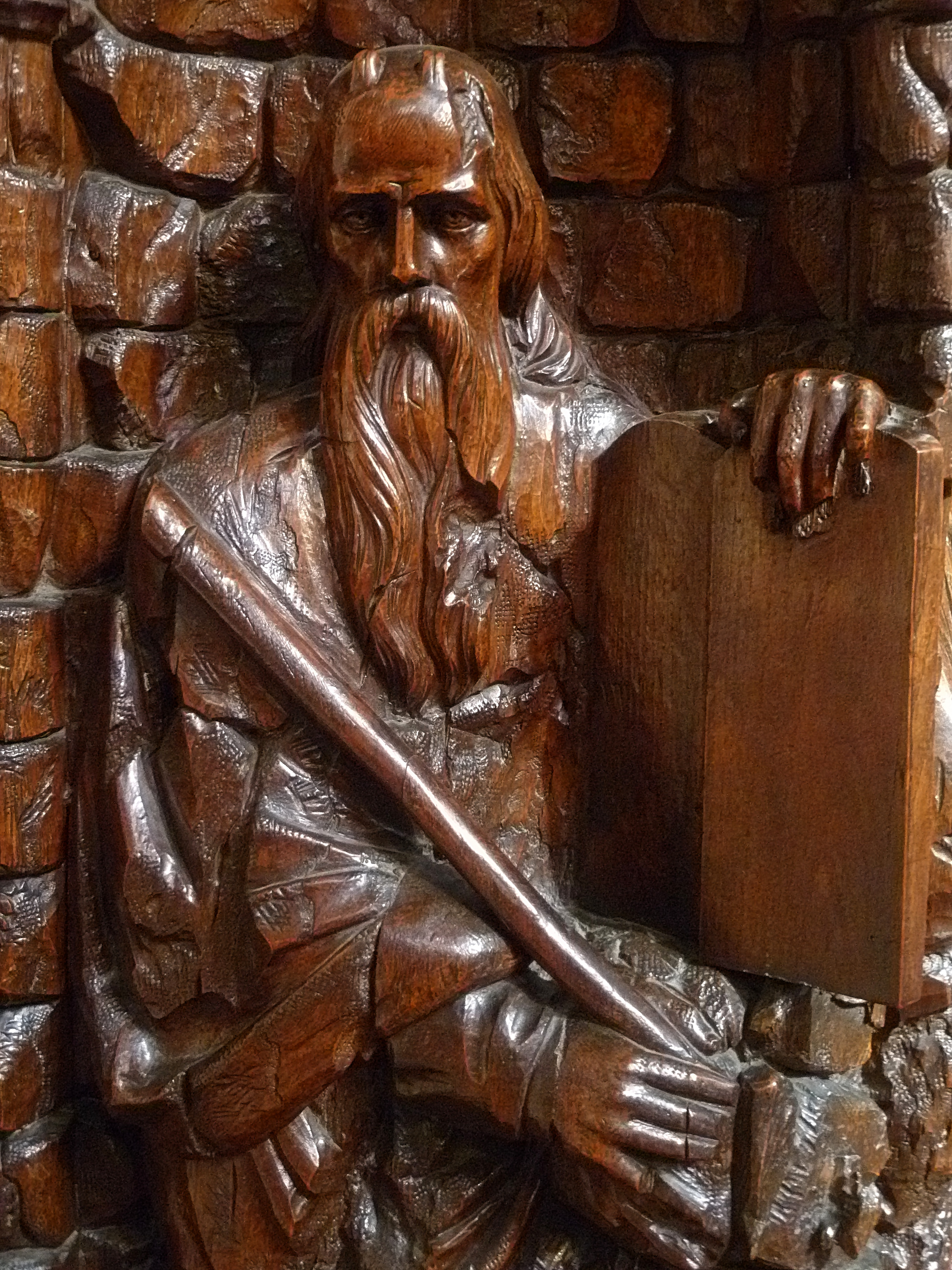
Carved image of Moses on the pulpit

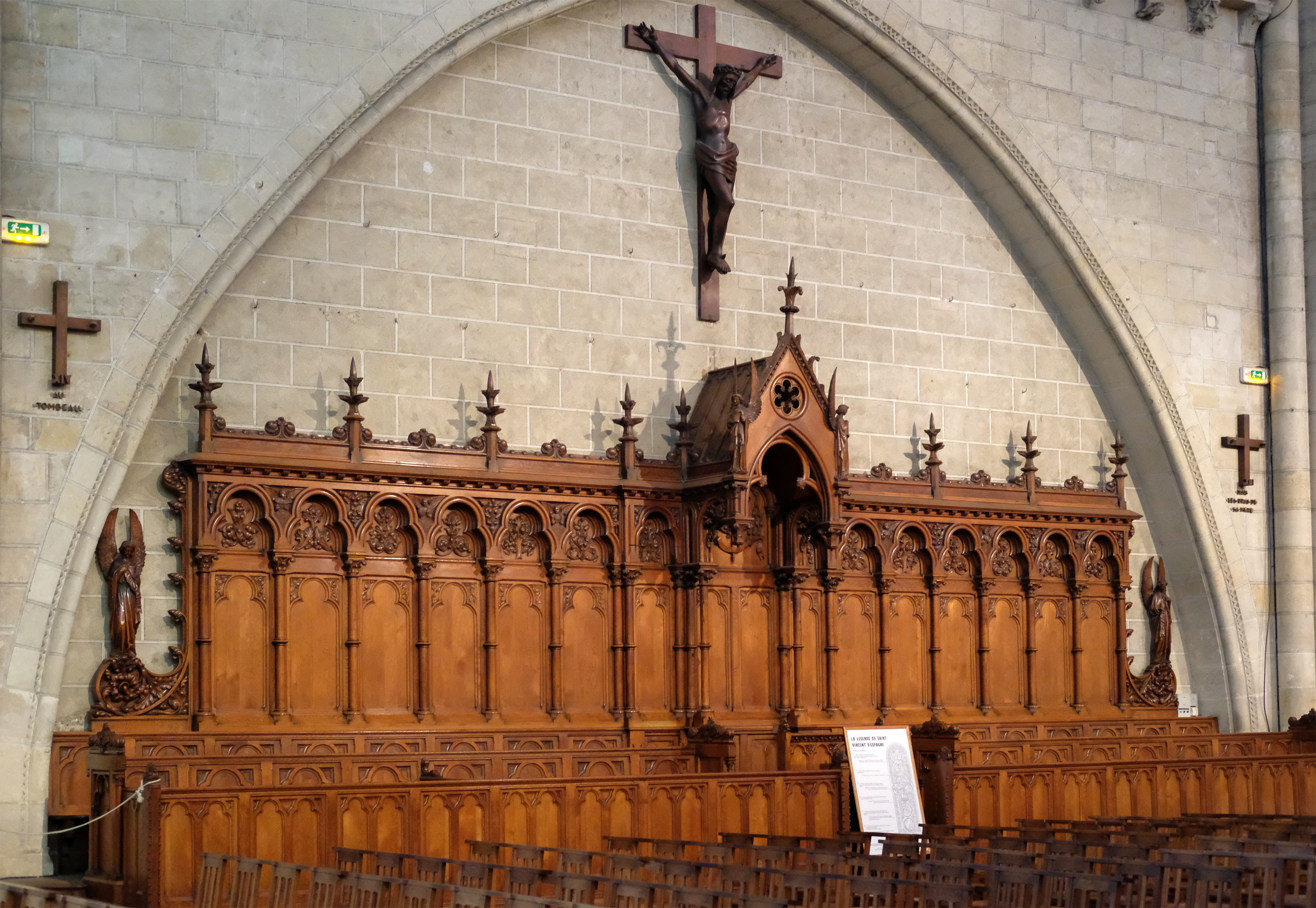
Choir stalls (19th c.)

The cathedral is noted for the rich wood carving of the pulpit. It was created in the 19th century by the Abbot and sculptor Choyer in the Neo-Gothic style, at the suggestion of Eugène Viollet-le-Duc, who was involved in the major restoration of the cathedral. Its carved sculpture features images of the patron of the cathedral, Saint Maurice, as well a figure of Adam supporting the pulpit from below.

=== Tapestries ===
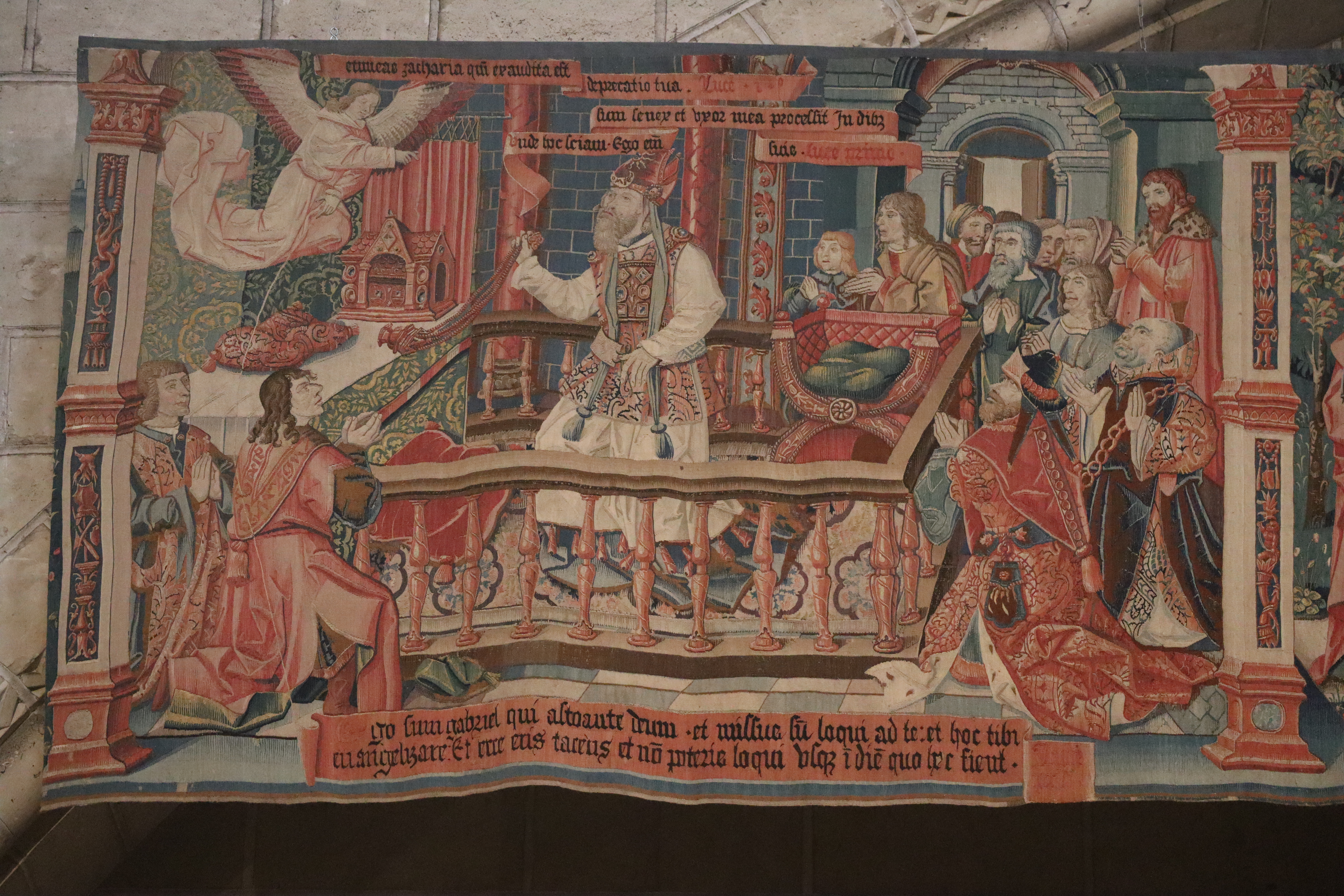
Tapestry - Scene from life of St. John the Baptist

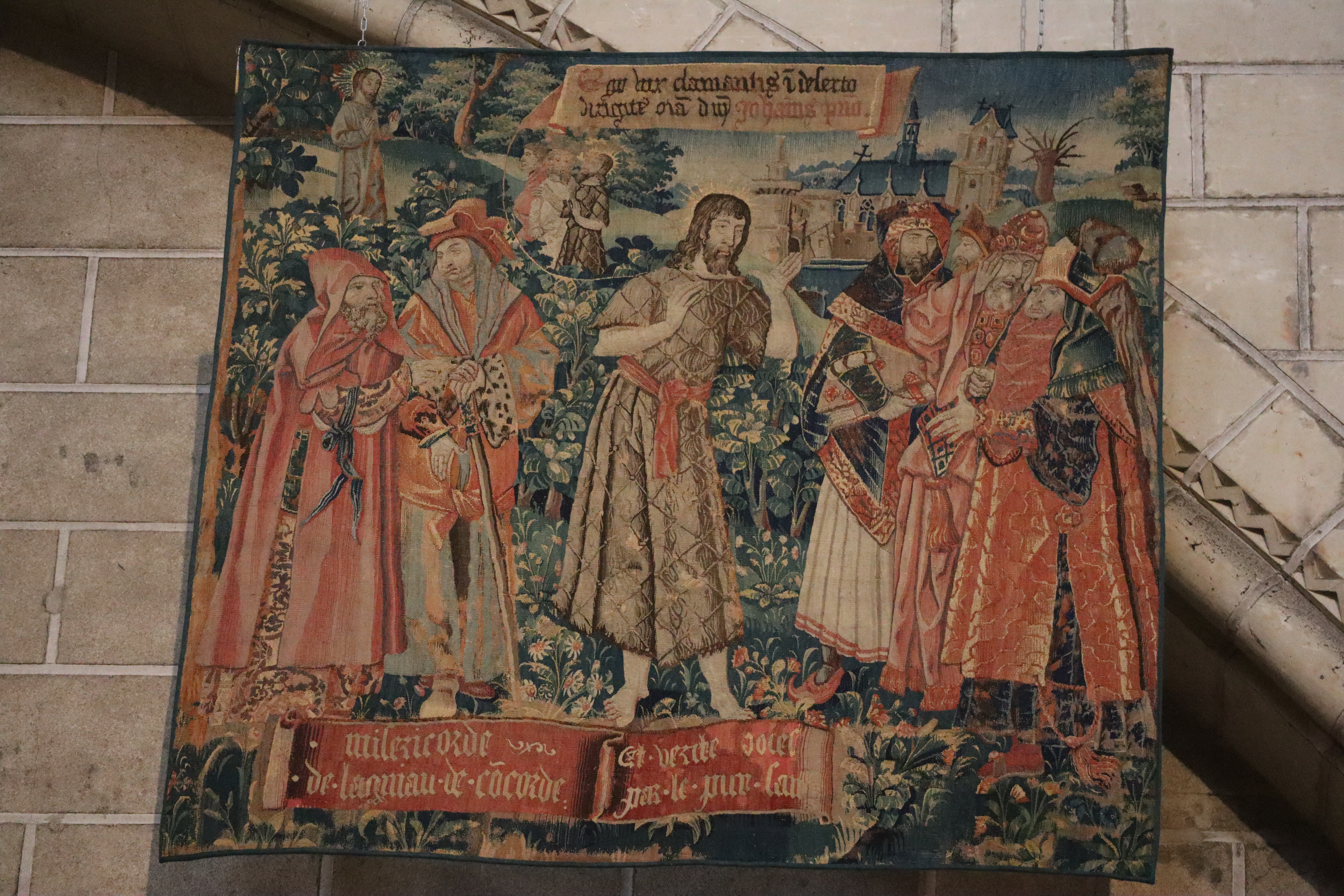
Tapestry; scene from life of St. John the Baptist

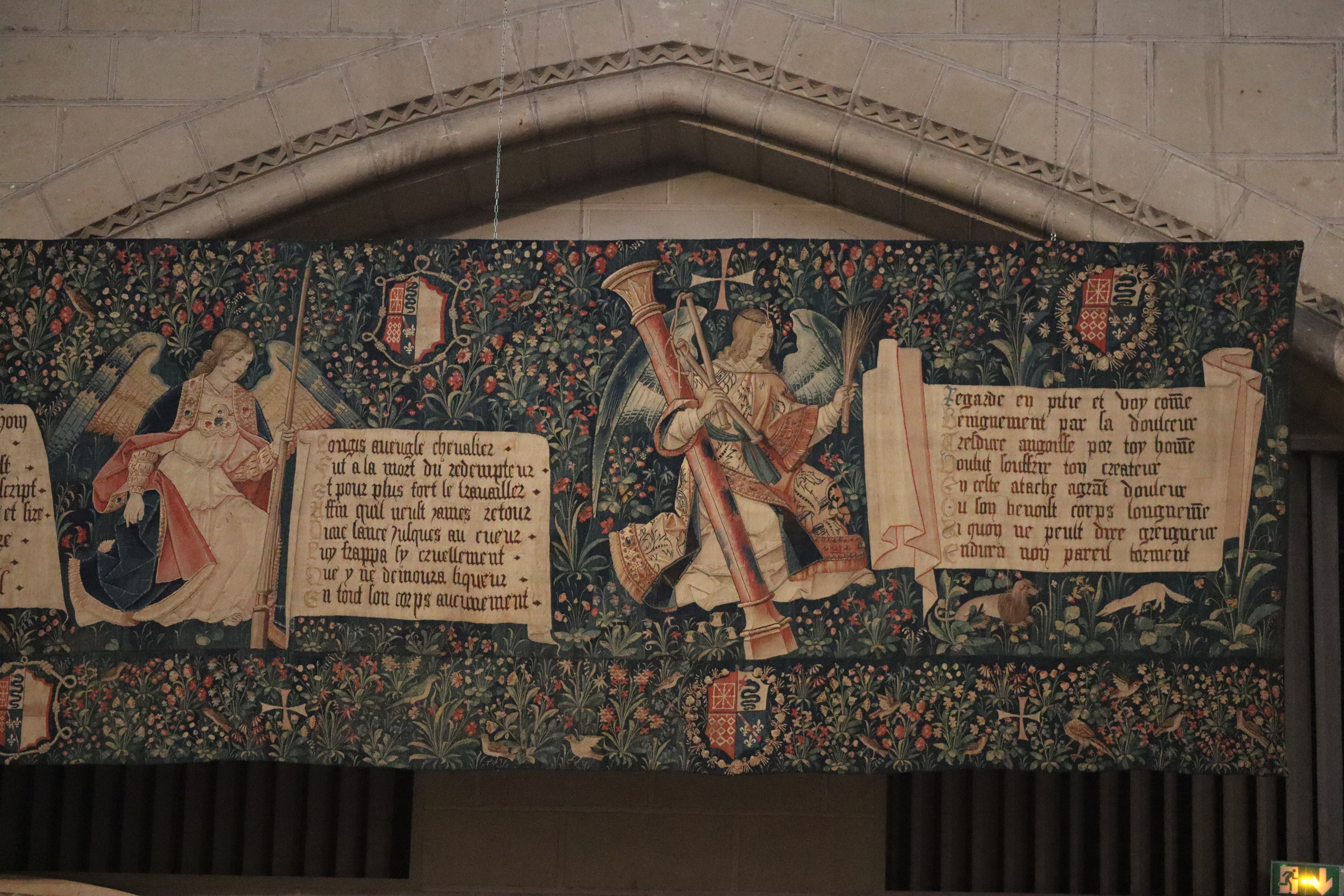
Tapestry of angels carrying instruments of the Passion

The cathedral has a particularly fine collection of medieval tapestries. The oldest group, which depicts the Apocalypse and Acts of Revelation, was donated to the cathedral by René of Anjou in 1480. It is now displayed at the Château d'Angers. The other ninety tapestries in the collection were made in Flanders and France from the 15th to the 18th century, and were gathered together in the cathedral in the second part of the 19th century, and are one of the most important single collections in Europe. In the past they were displayed only for certain religious holidays. Now they are hung as a group only during the festivals of Saint John and Saint Maurice, with the others only displayed individually according to the liturgical calendar.

=== Murals ===
In about 1980 several remarkable mural paintings dating from 1240 to 1260 were discovered hidden behind the elaborate 18th century woodwork in the back of the apse, which had been created by Sébastien Leyssner. They depict the miracles achieved by Saint Maurilius of Angers, a 5th-century bishop of Angers, whose miracles included the resurrection of Saint René, who later became a member of the chapter of the cathedral.

=== Sculpture ===
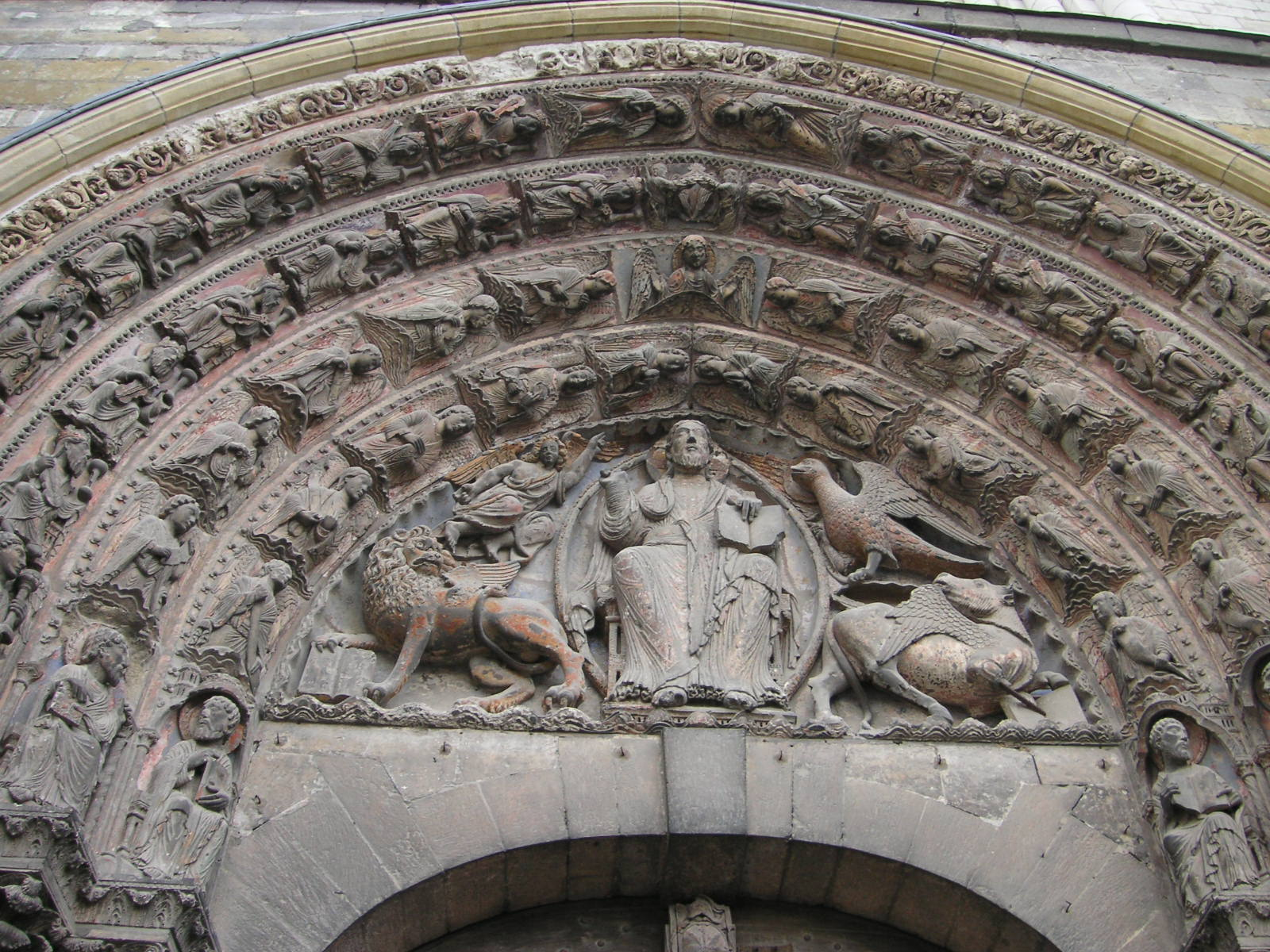
Tympanum of the west portal, showing Christ in Majesty, surrounded by the symbols of the Four Evangelists

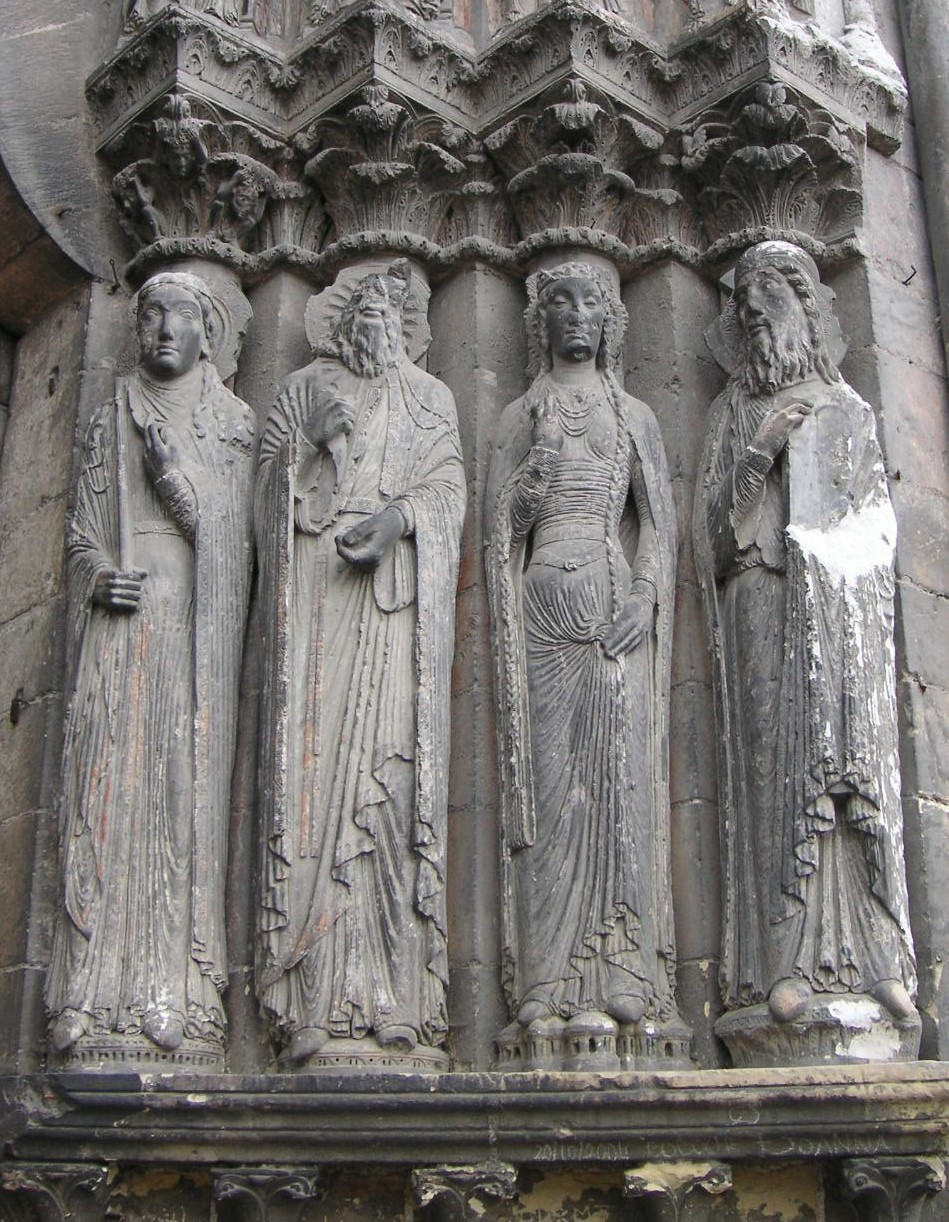
Sculpture of the west portal (12th c.)

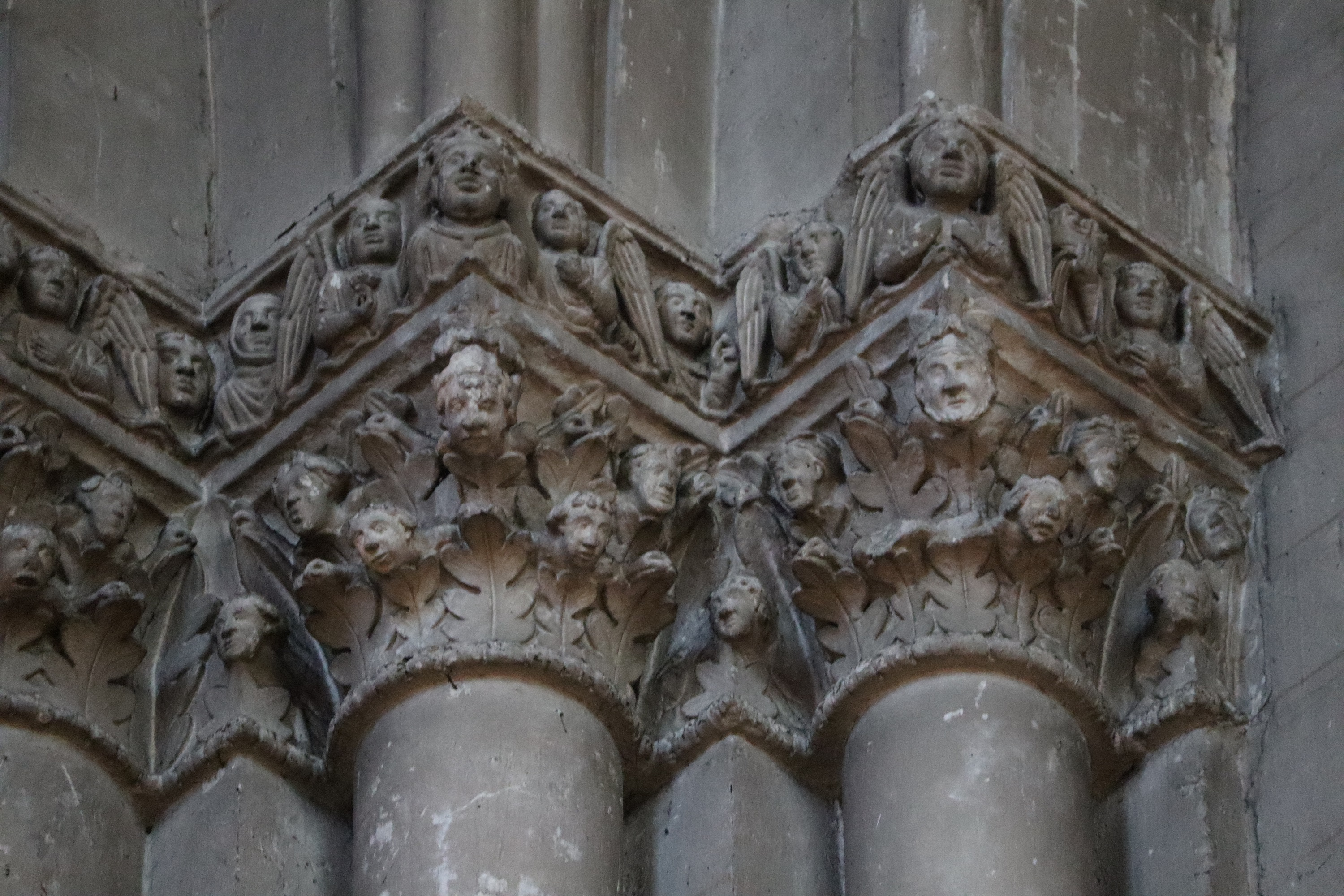
Sculpted capitals of columns supporting the vaults of the transept

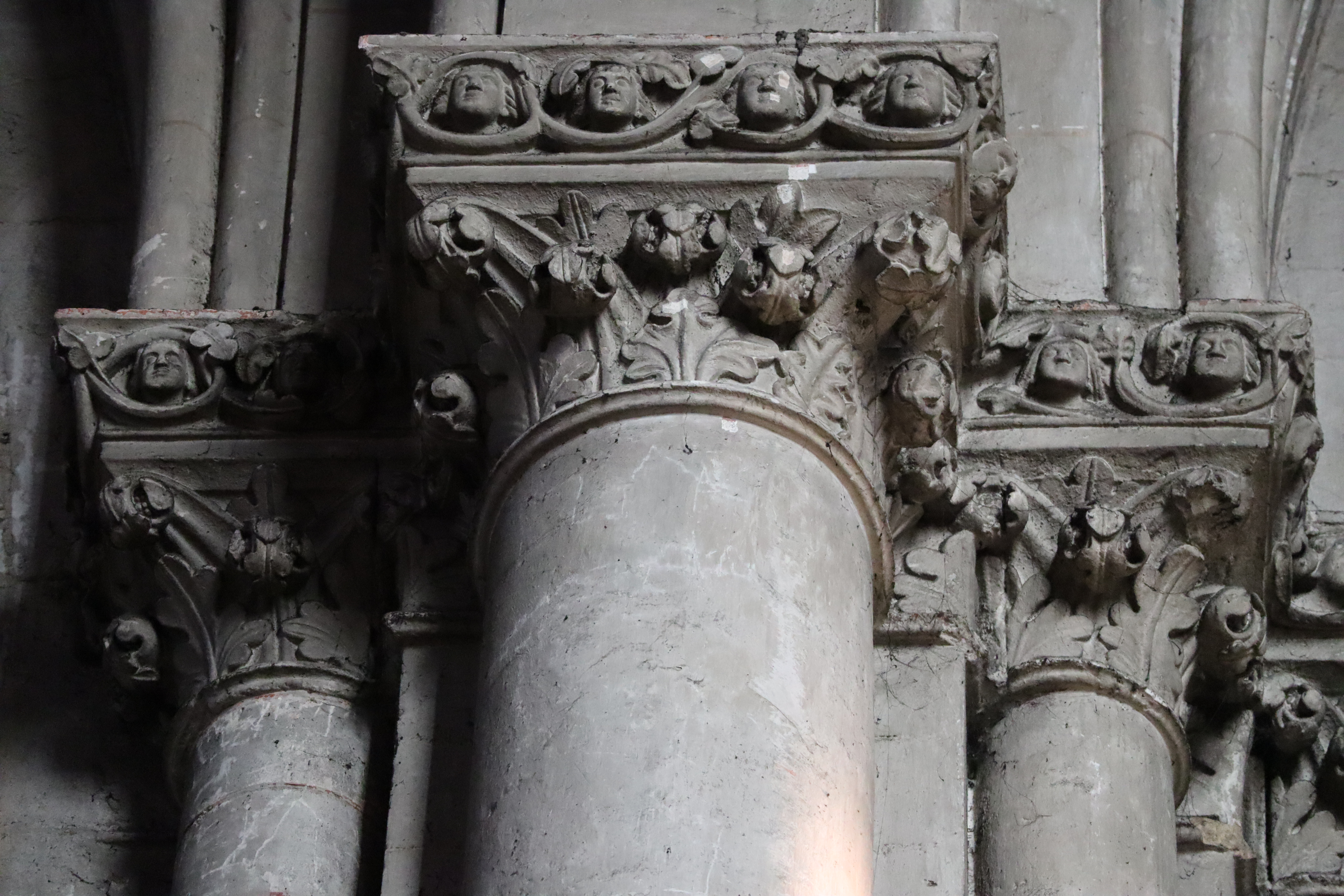
Column capitals, southwest corner of north transept

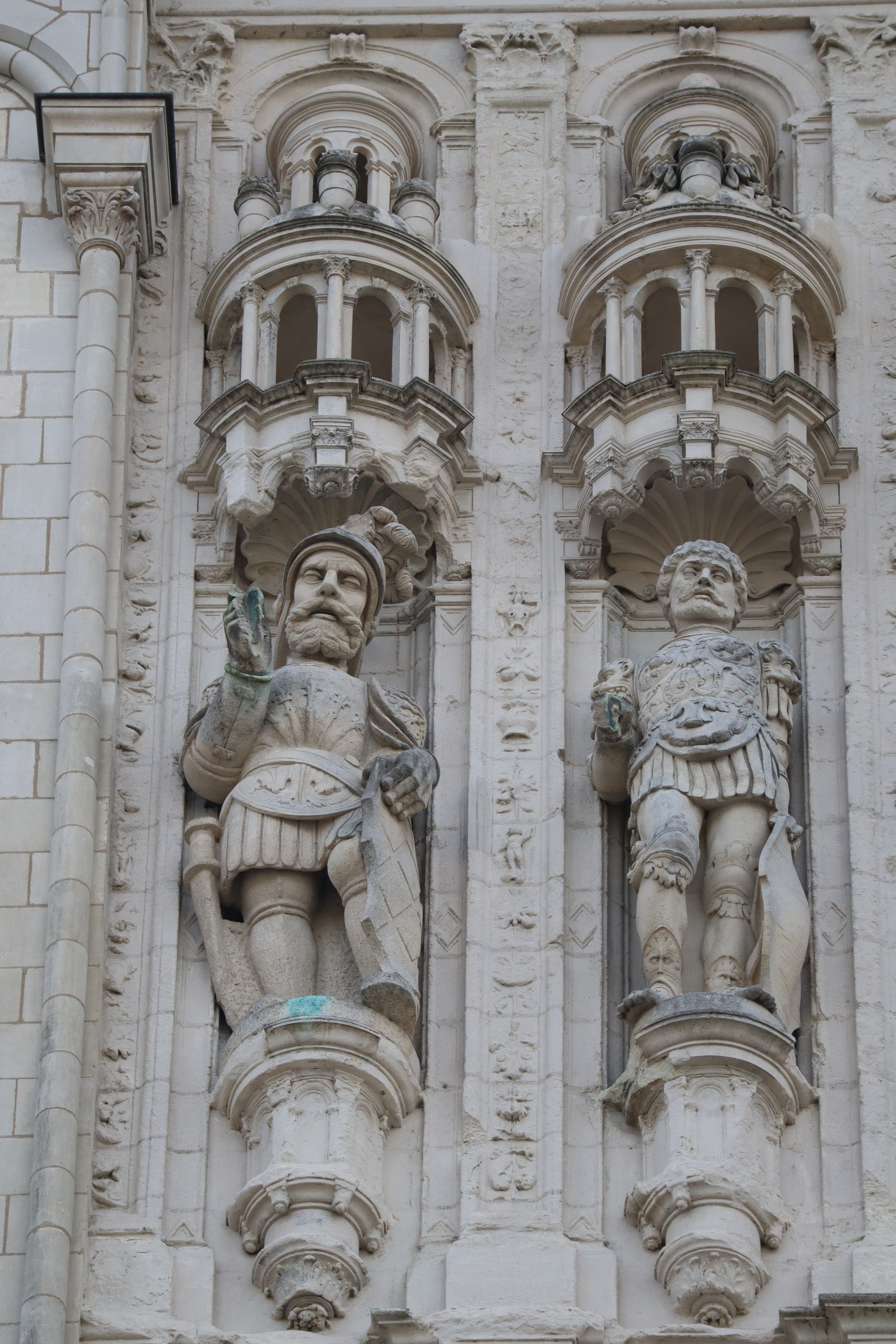
Details of sculpture of the martyr-companions of Saint Maurice

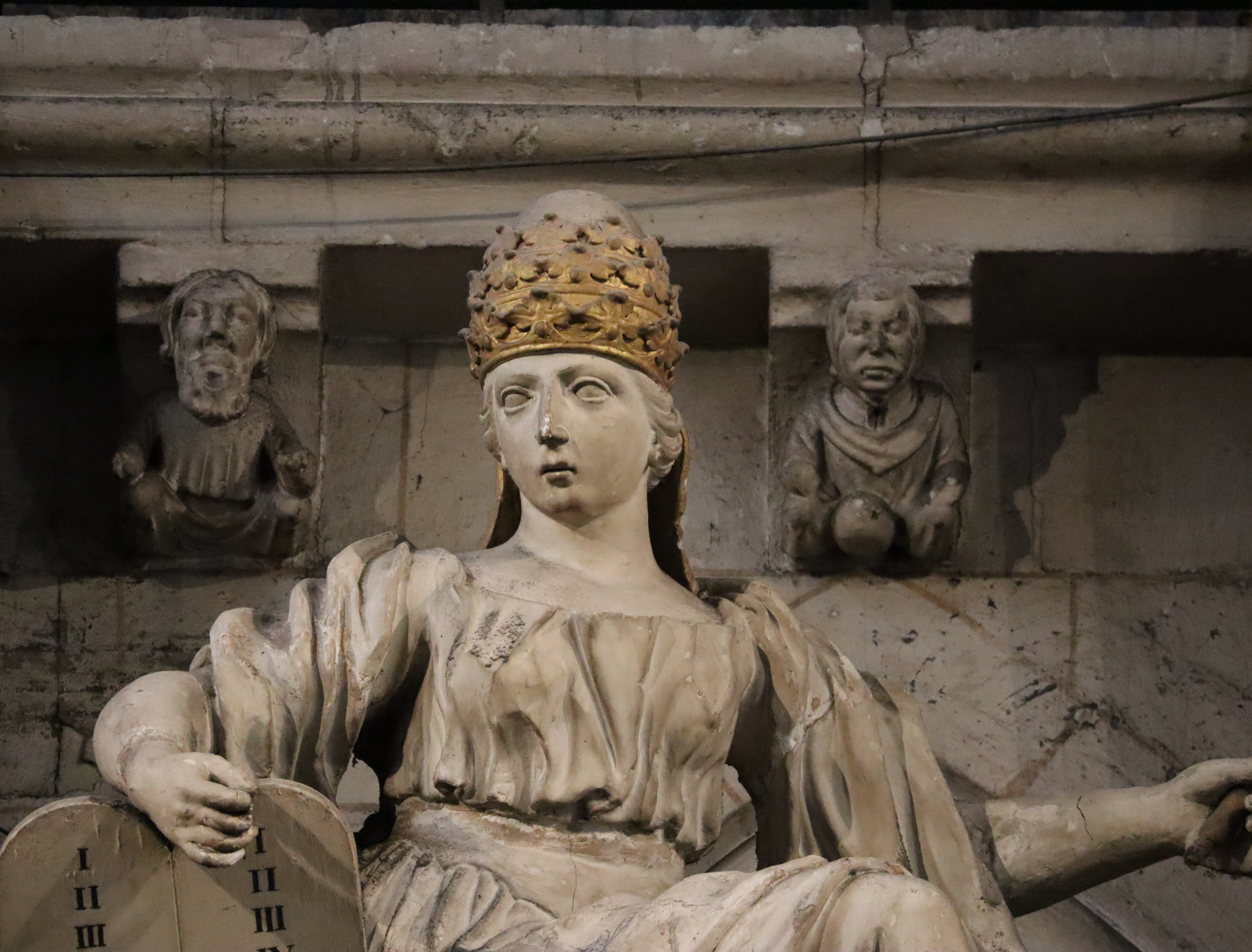
Baroque sculpture and earlier modillons behind her in the choir

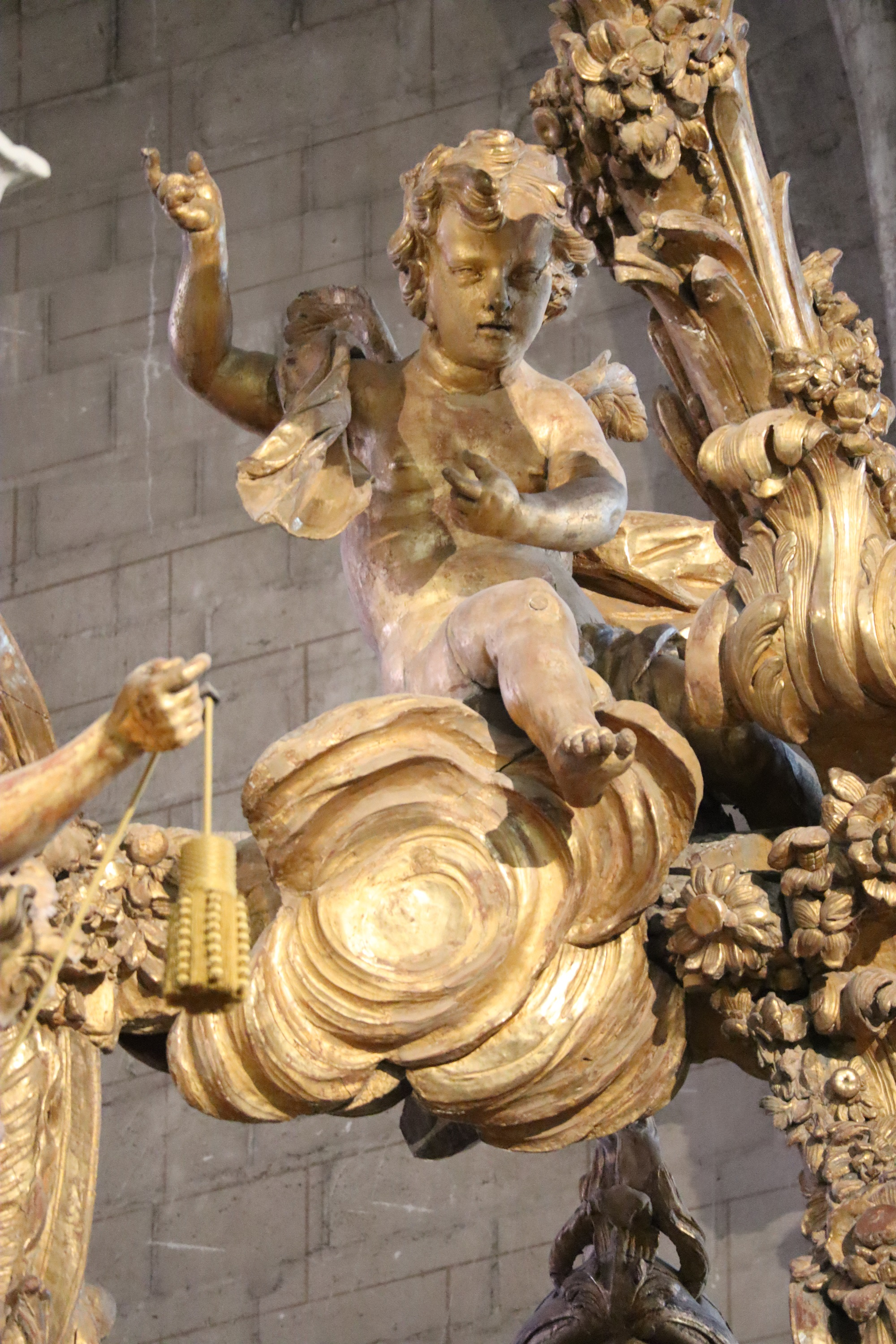
detail of the Baroque ciborium or canopy of the altar, from 1757

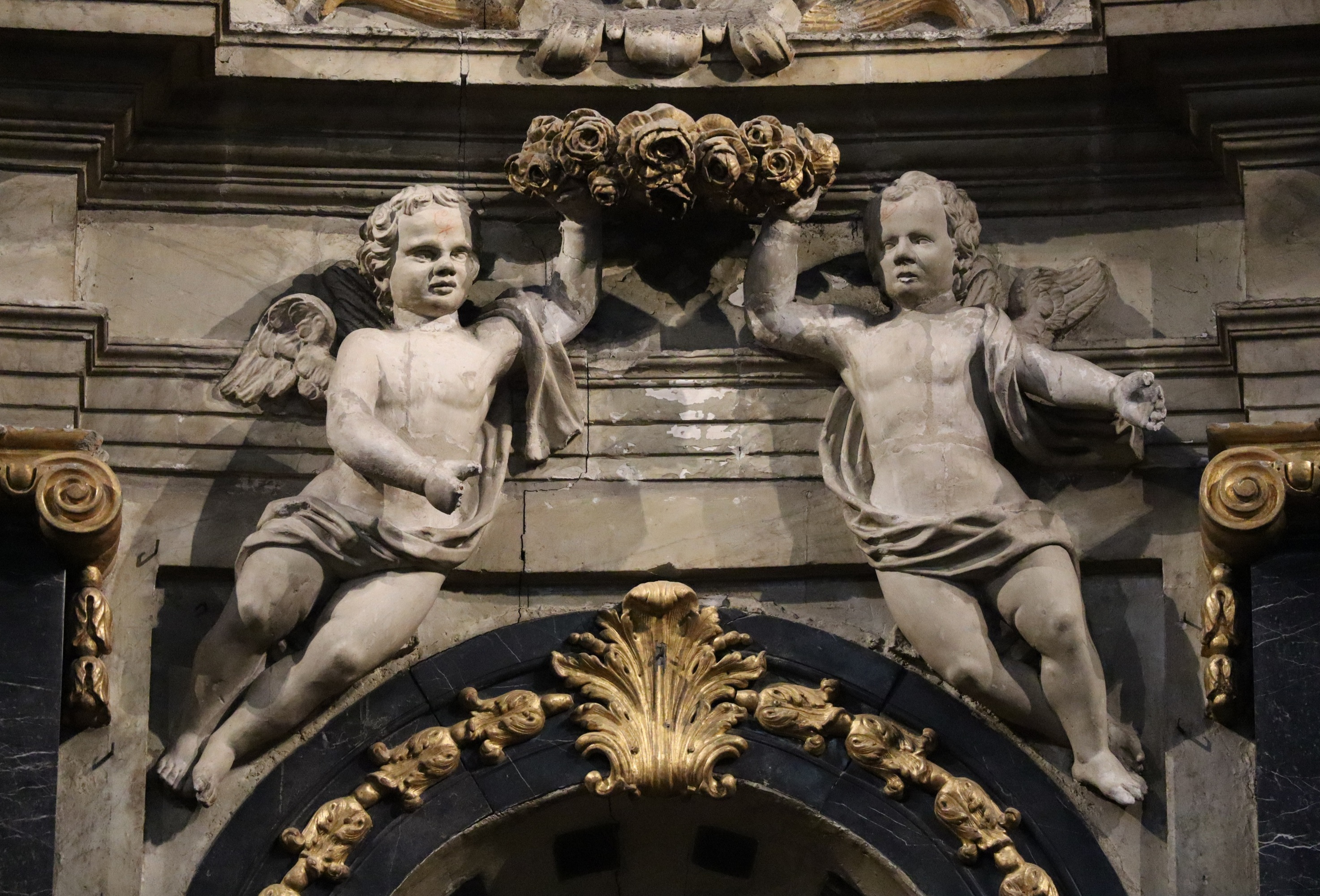
Baroque sculpture on the Saint-Maurice altar

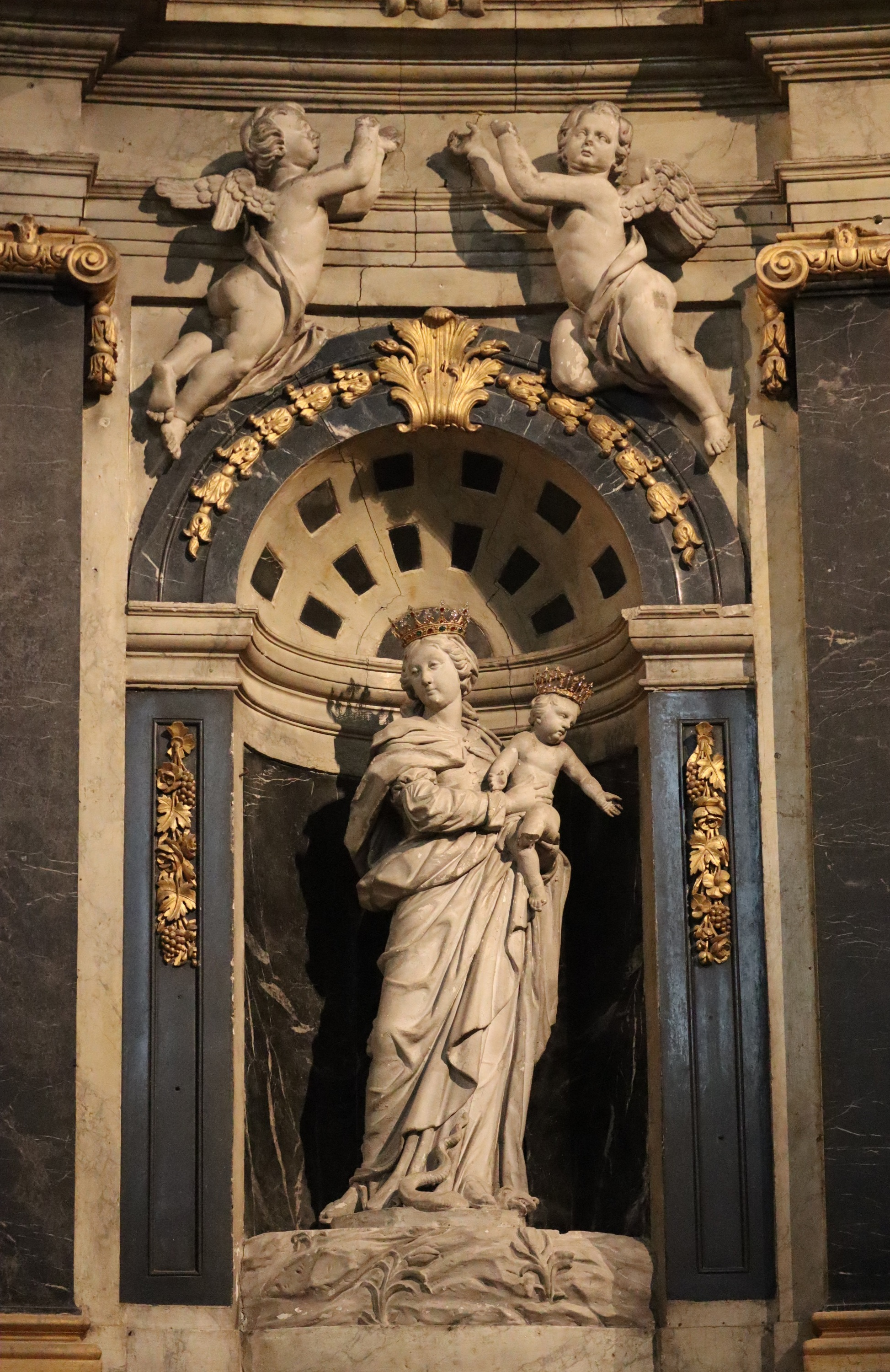
Baroque sculpture of the Virgin Altar

The cathedral has a particularly rich collection of sculpture, ranging from Romanesque and Gothic column capitals decorated with faces, to dramatic scenes of Baroque sculpture above the main altar. There is also an assortment of tomb sculpture from different periods.

=== Other decorative elements ===
Among the significant works in the cathedral are:

- the north transept was paved by the architect Guillaume Robin in 1453;
- the straight staircase to the library built by Guillaume Robin, also in 1453, in the south transept. He supervised the construction of the cathedral at the same time as the master glassmaker, André Robin, made the stained glass windows.

== Grand organ ==
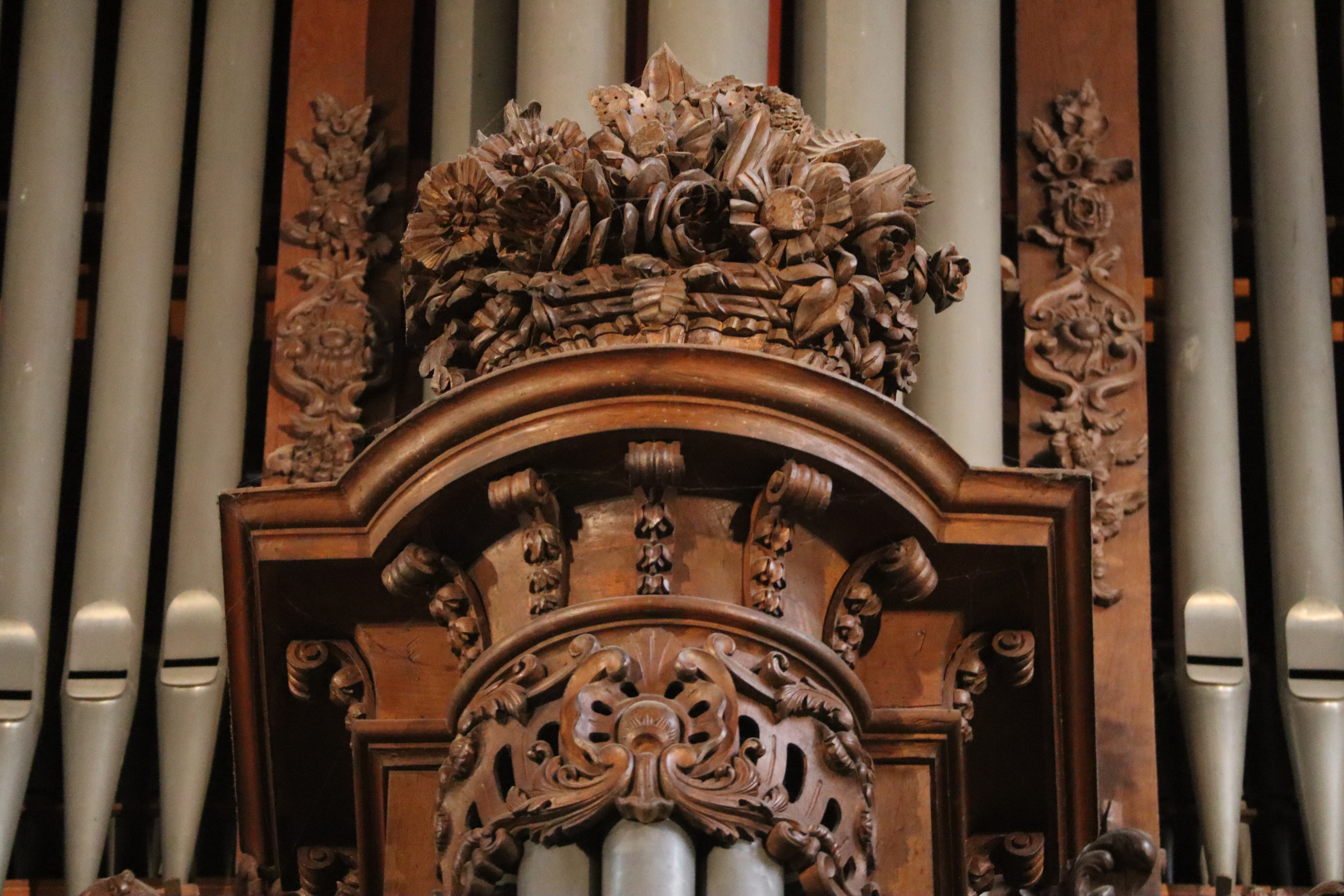
Baroque sculpture of the organ case (18th c.)

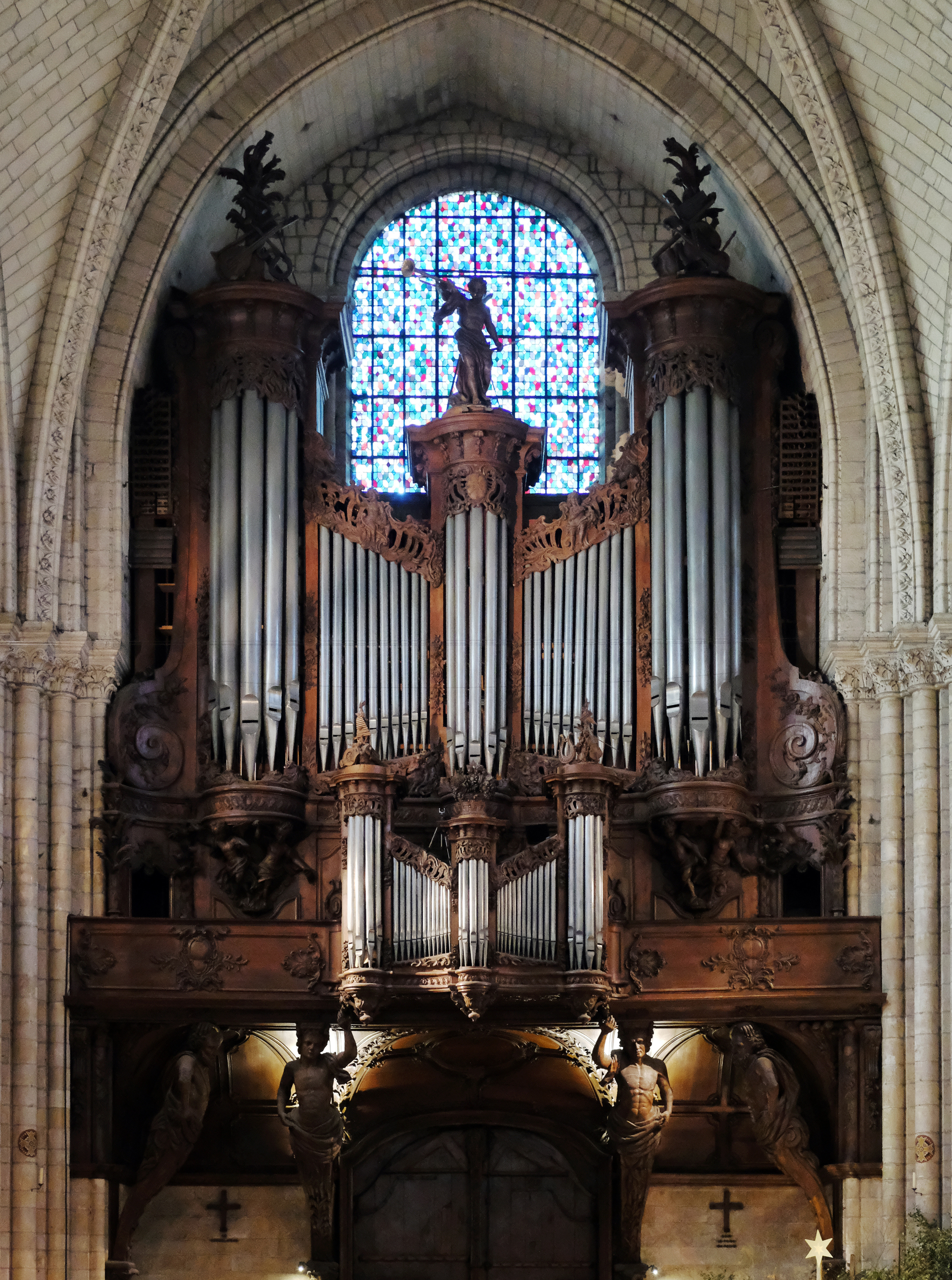
The grand organ (1742–48)

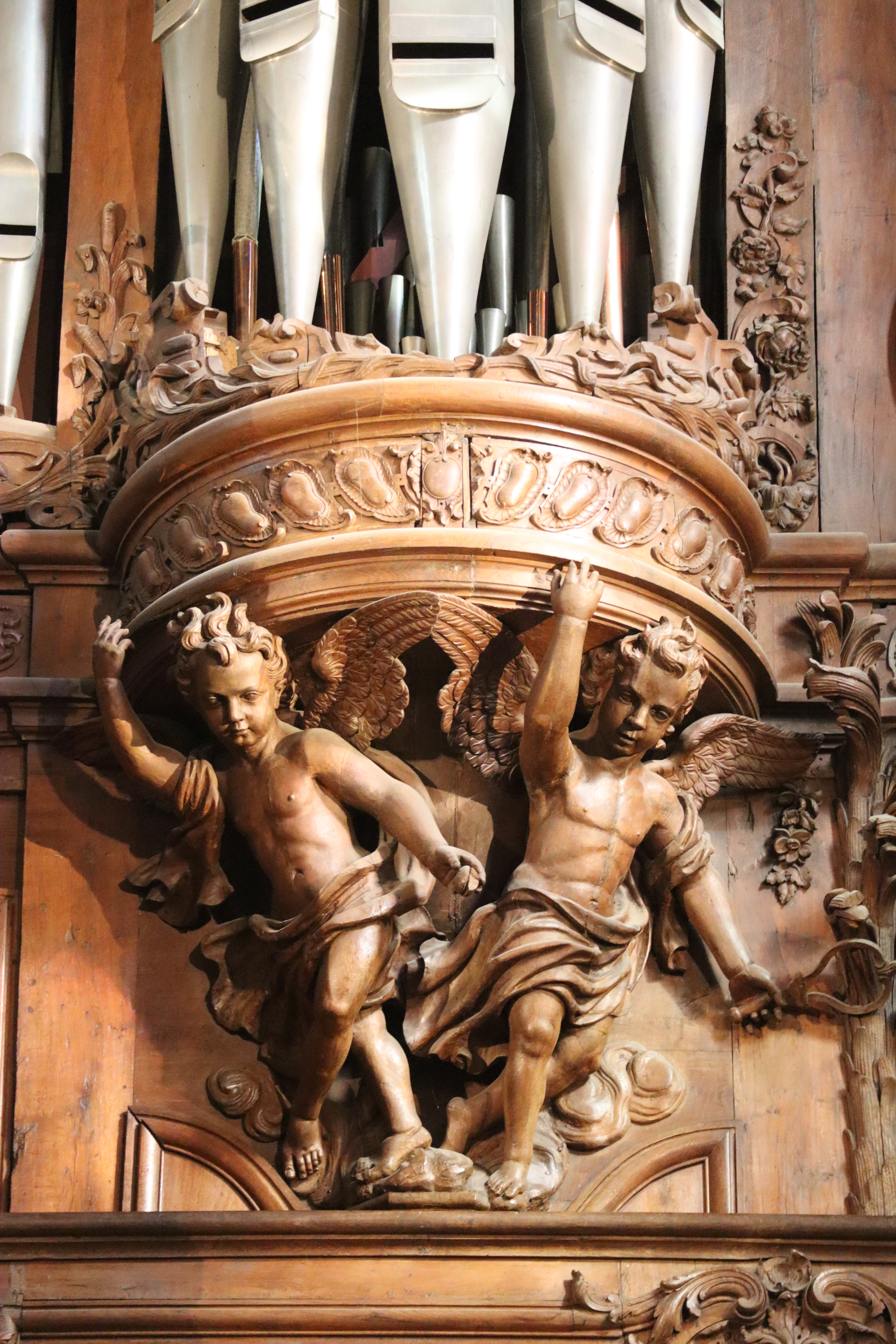
Detail of the pipe organ case

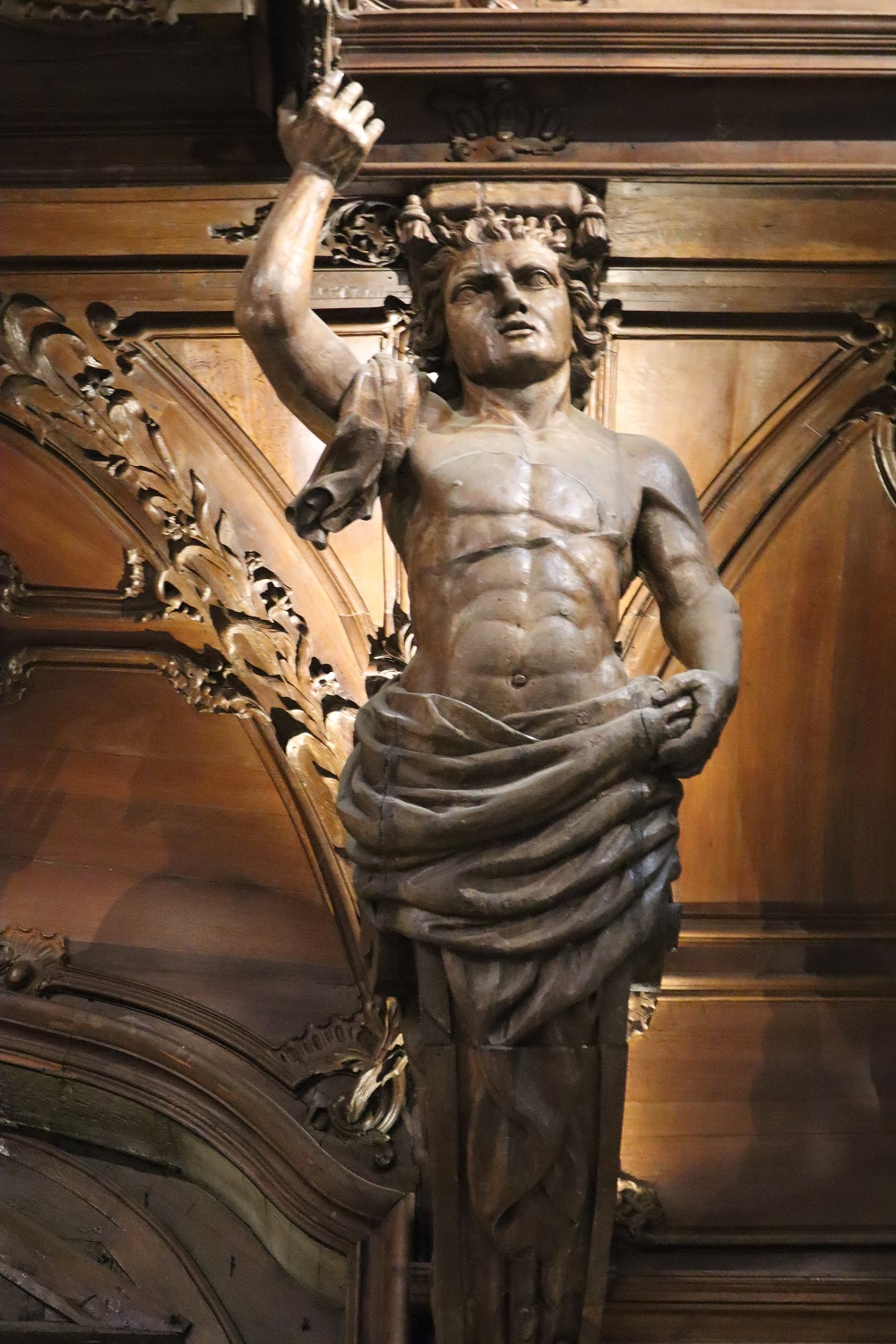
Sculpture of organ tribune (18th c.)

A pipe organ has been in the cathedral from as early as the 14th century but the current version was built only in 1617 by the organ maker, Jacques Girardet, who was probably recycling the pipes and other parts from the previous organ. An earlier organ was replaced in 1416 with a new case by Jean Chabencel but in 1451 it was destroyed by a fire. A replacement was built in 1507 on the initiative of Anne of Brittany on the original spot, the organ loft in the choir. It was restored for the first time, after another fire, in 1533 by Peter Bert and for the second time in 1701 by Marin Ingoult, who added the pedalboard. When Ingoult was done, the organ had, besides the pedalboard, 47 stops with four keyboards (manuals). In the 18th century, its case was replaced. Between 1869 and 1872, the organ was reorganized by Aristide Cavaillé-Coll. In 1957 it was electrified, adding 19 stops to make a total of 66 stops, with just three manuals and a pedalboard. It is in the balcony of the organ loft at the west end of the cathedral.

Stoplist
I. Positif
Quintaton 16'

Montre 8'

Bourdon 8'

Unda Maris 8'

Prestant 4'

Flûte douce 4'

Quinte 2 2/3'

Doublette 2'

Cornet 8' V

Fourniture III

Cymbale III

Trompette 8'

Cromorne 8'

Clairon 4'

II. Grand-Orgue
Montre 16'

Bourdon 16'

Montre 8'

Bourdon 8'

Flûte harmonique 8'

Salicional 8'

Grosse Quinte 5 1/3'

Prestant 4'

Flûte 4'

Quinte 2 2/3'

Doublette 2'

Tierce i 3/5'

Grand Cornet 16' V

Plein-jeu I

Cymbale III

Bombarde 16'

Trompette 8'

Clairon 4'

Trompette en chamade 8'

Clairon en chamade 4'

III. Récit

(expressif / enclosed)

Bourdon 16'

Principal 8'

Quintaton 8'

Viole de gambe 8'

Voix céleste 8'

Flûte harmonique 8'

Prestant 4'

Flûte octaviante 4'

Nazard 2 2/3'

Octavin 2'

Tierce 1 3/5'

Fourniture IV

Cymbale IV

Bombarde acoustique 16

Trompette 8'

Basson-Hautbois 8'

Voix humaine 8'

Clairon 4'

Pédale
Soubasse 32'

Contrebasse 16'

Bourdon 16'

Violoncelle 8'

Bourdon 8'

Flûte 8'

Octave 4'

Doublette 2'

Plein-jeu IV

Bombarde acoustique 32'

Bombarde 16'

Trompette 8'

Clairon 4'

== Bells ==
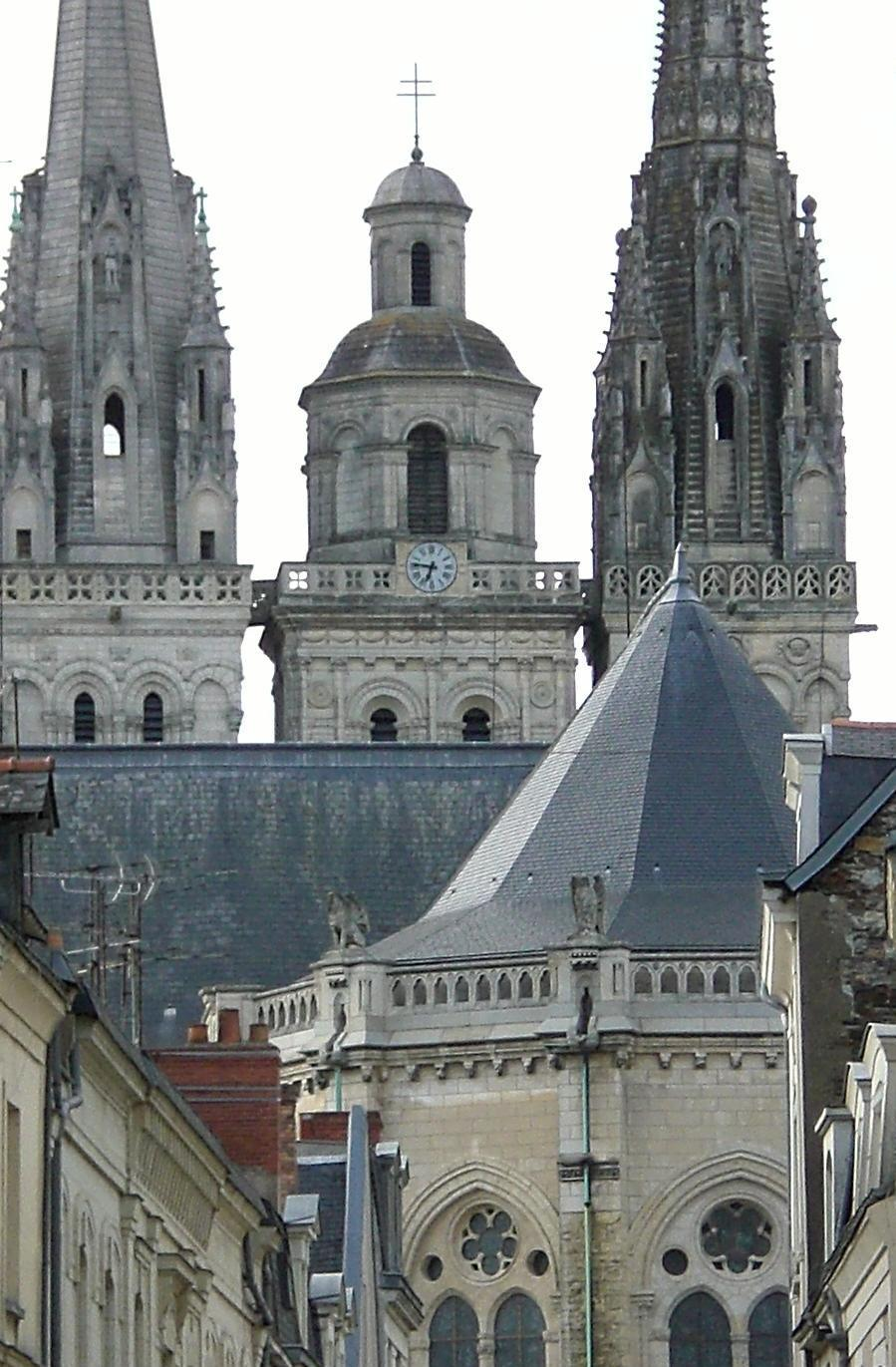
The bell tower, center, topped with the cross of Anjou

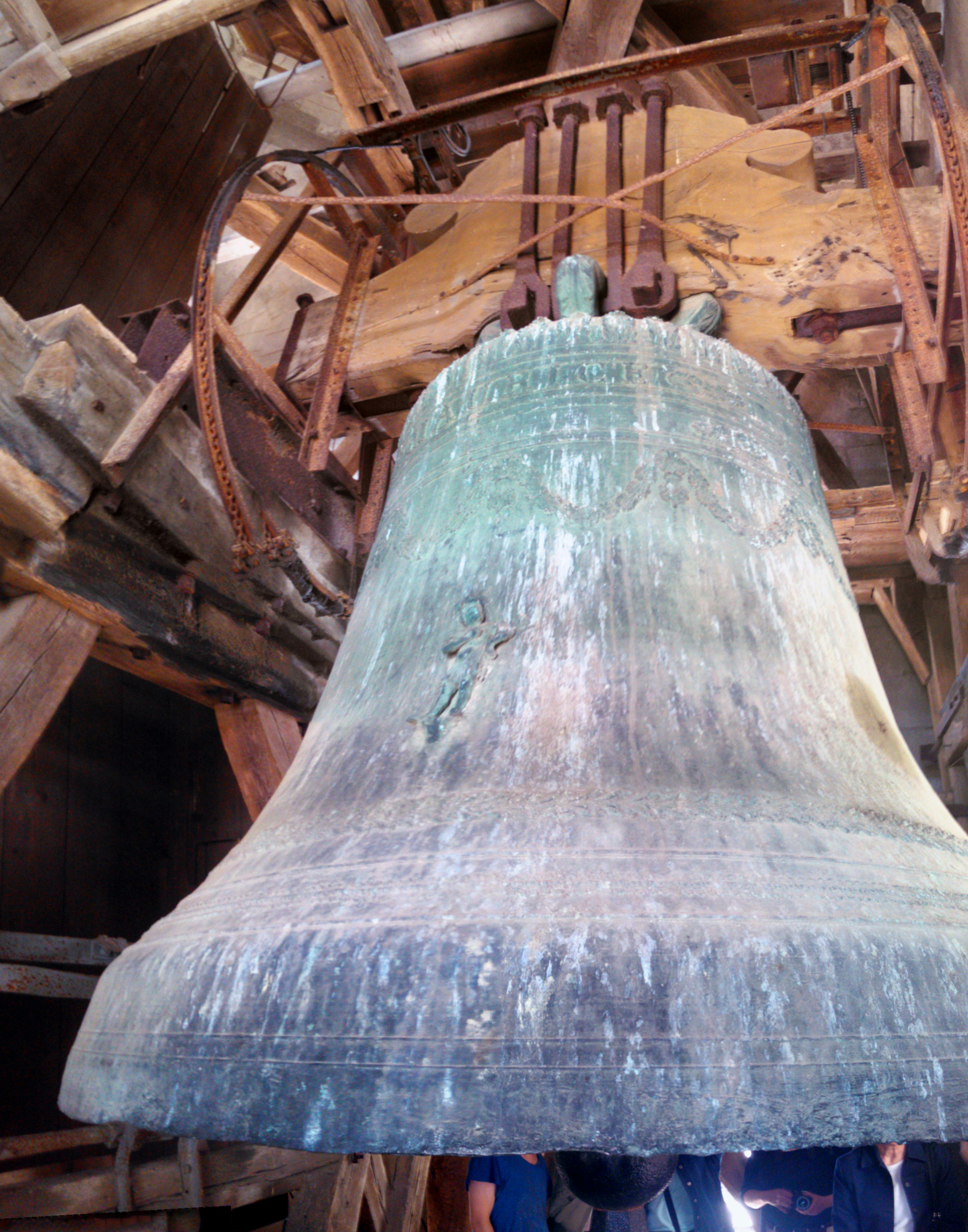
The Bourdon, or largest bell, named Maurice

The cathedral has nine bells, housed in central tower. The Bourdon, the largest and oldest bell, with the deepest notes, is named Maurice; It was Founded by the firm of Besson, and weighs 6700 kilograms.

== Burials ==
- Yolande of Aragon
- Margaret of Anjou
- René of Anjou

== See also ==
- List of Gothic cathedrals in Europe
- French Gothic architecture
- French Gothic stained glass windows
- High medieval domes

== Sources ==
- Lours, Mathieu (2018). Dictionnaire des Cathédrales (in French). Editions Jean-Paul Gisserot. ISBN 978-27558-0765-3.
