= Strohmeyer =

Strohmeyer, Stromeyer, Strohmayer or Stromayer is a German surname. It comes from the occupation of Strohmeyer, a straw tax collector. Notable people with the surname include:

== Strohmayer ==
- Alois Strohmayer (1822–1890), Austrian composer
- Anton Strohmayer (1848–1937), Austrian musician
- John Strohmayer (1946–2019), American baseball player
- Richard Strohmayer (born 1981), Austrian footballer and coach

== Strohmeyer ==
- Arno Strohmeyer (born 1963), Austrian fencer
- George Strohmeyer (1924–1992), American football player
- Ingeborg Strohmeyer (born 1943), German philosopher
- Jeremy Strohmeyer (born 1978), American convicted murderer
- John Strohmeyer (1924–2010), American journalist
- Sarah Strohmeyer (born 1962), American author

== Stromayer ==
- Eric Stromayer (born 1960), American diplomat

== Stromeyer ==
- David Stromeyer (born 1946), American sculptor
- Friedrich Stromeyer (1776–1835), German chemist
- Helene Marie Stromeyer (1834–1924), German painter
- Louis Stromeyer (1804–1876), German surgeon

== See also ==
- Stromer
- Strohmeier
