= Jacques Mathieu Delpech =

French surgeon (1777–1832)

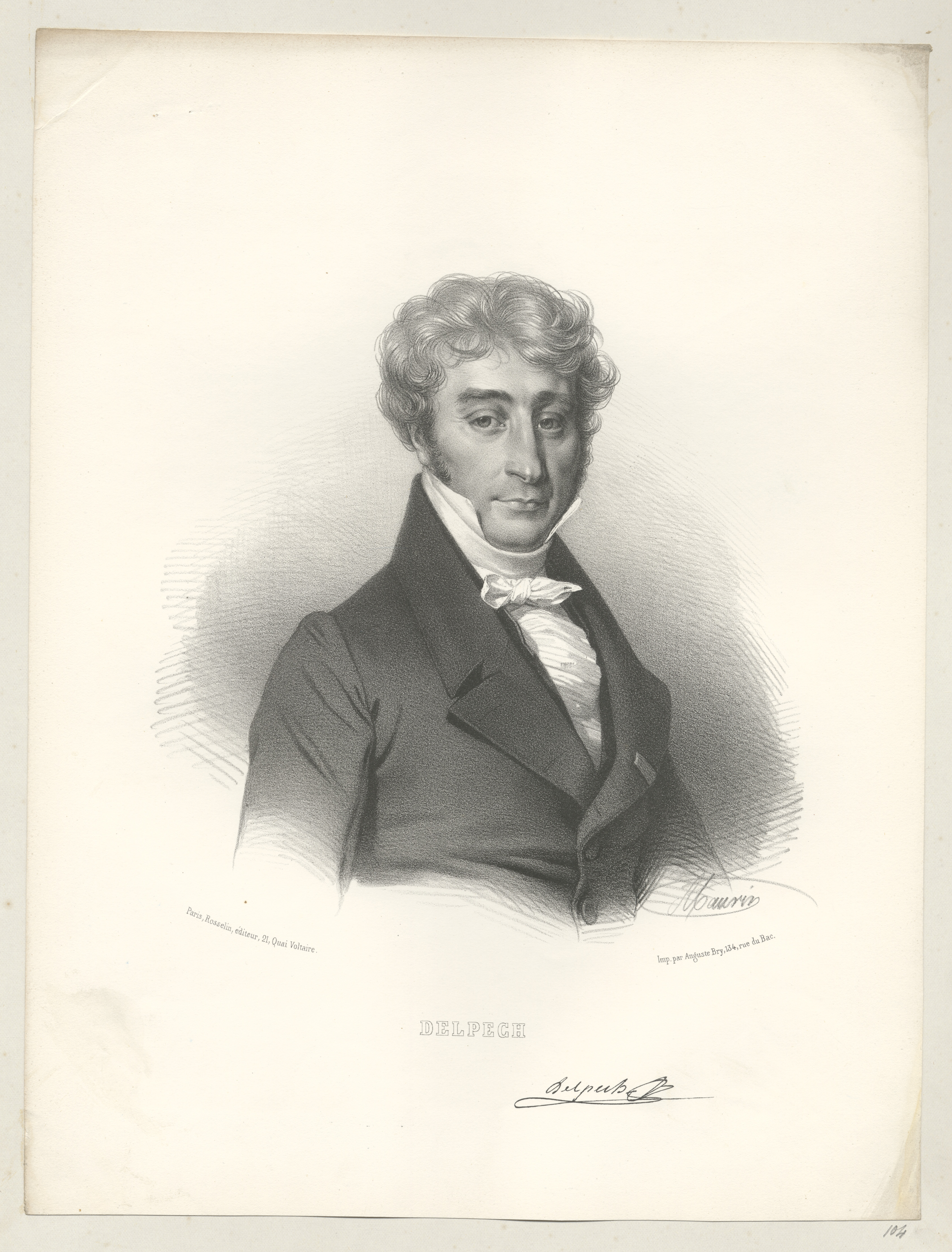
- Jacques Mathieu Delpech
- Born: 1777; Toulouse
- Died: 28 October 1832 (aged 54–55); Montpellier
- Education: University of Paris
- Known for: orthopedics
- Scientific career
- Fields: surgeon

Jacques Mathieu Delpech (1777 – 28 October 1832) was a French surgeon born in Toulouse.

He earned his doctorate from the University of Paris in 1801 and spent the next several years as a teacher of anatomy in Toulouse. In 1812 he became a surgeon at Hôtel-Dieu Saint-Eloi in Montpellier, where he remained until his death in 1832.

Delpech is best known for his work in orthopedics, and he established a clinic for orthopaedic diseases at Saint-Eloi. There he advocated a surgical process known as "tenotomy" to correct contracture abnormalities of the extremities. He was also a pioneer of skin grafting and rhinoplasty, and is credited for documenting the first rhinoplastic operation in France.

Delpech died when he was shot by a patient on 28 October 1832.

== Partial list of works ==
- Réflexions et observations anatomico-chirurgicales sur l’anévrisme (1809), (Translation of Antonio Scarpa's (1752–1832) work on aneurysms).
- Précis des maladies chirurgicales, (1815)
- Considérations sur la difformité appelée pied-bots, (1823)
- Chirurgie clinique de Montpellier, (1823–28) (two volumes)
- De l’orthomorphie par rapport à l´espèce humaine, two volumes with atlas, (1828).

== See also ==
- Listing of the works of Alexandre Falguière
