= William John Little =

English surgeon

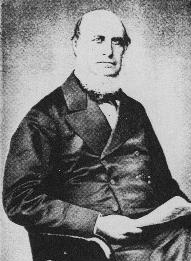
William John Little

William John Little (1810–1894) was an English surgeon who is credited with the first medical identification of spastic diplegia, when he observed it in the 1860s amongst children. While spasticity surely existed before that point, Little was the first person to medically record the condition in writing. Thus, for many years, spastic diplegia was known as Little's Disease; only later did the name change. Also, Little founded the Royal Orthopaedic Hospital of London.

== Life ==
Little was born at the Red Lion Inn in Whitechapel. His parents John and Hannah little were the inn's proprietors.

Little did not have any spasticity himself, but he suffered childhood poliomyelitis with residual left lower-extremity paraparesis, complicated by severe talipes. This undoubtedly sparked his special interest in lower-extremity mobility impairments, as well as his medical-orthopedic inclinations more generally. As a youth he was an apothecary's apprentice, surrendering his indentures at the age of 18 and entering medical school at the London Hospital. He was admitted to the Royal College of Surgeons in 1832.

Little is also known for his doctoral dissertation in 1837 on tenotomy, the first monograph on the subject ever published, and Little became the known source of this operation, intended for the correction of skeletal deformity secondary to neuromuscular disorders.

Little later travelled to Germany to study the technique of subcutaneous tenotomy with its originator, Louis Stromeyer, who subsequently corrected Little's deformed foot by this method. Among his many publications was "On the Deformities of the Human Frame" (1853) in which he first described pseudo-hypertrophic muscular dystrophy, preceding Guillaume Duchenne's paper on the same condition by eight years.

The techniques originated by Stromeyer and applied by Little are used today in the surgical management of quite a few neuromuscular conditions today, although obviously in modern times they are quite a bit more advanced due to technological progress and improvements in surgical concepts and methods. Little was one of the first to bridge the gap between neurology and orthopaedics, and his important work continues to impact both of these fields, including the fact of continually-increasing cooperation between orthopaedic surgeons and neurosurgeons in today's management of spastic cerebral palsy and similar neuromuscular disabilities.

Little died and was buried in the Kent village Ryarsh.

== Family ==
He had eleven children including Edward Little, who was also a surgeon, and Archibald Little. Archibald married Alicia Little, a writer who campaigned against foot binding in China.
