= Pèire Godolin =

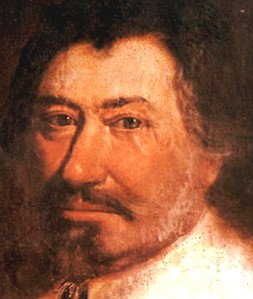
- Born: Pèire Godolin; 1580; Toulouse, France
- Died: 1649 (aged 68–69); Toulouse, France
- Occupations: Poet, writer
- Writing career
- Language: French, Occitan

Pèire Godolin, whose name is often Frenchified to Pierre Goudouli, or even Pierre Goudelin was born in 1580 in Toulouse where he died on the 10 September 1649, was an Occitan poet. He wrote in the Toulouse dialect.

== A Toulouse poet of the start of the 17th century ==
He was the son of Raymond Godolin, a Catholic lawyer, he also worked in law after studying with the Jesuits. He started his career in a Toulouse society noted for the violence of religious wars. Towards 1600, the town and its local parliament were taken over by Henry IV of France. The cultural elite were watched until 1610. At this time, Peyre Godolin became known as the most inventive of the local poets, who included his friend the Gascon poet Bertrand Larade, later Guilhem Ader and Jean-Géraud d'Astros, for using the range of languages' registers. But without doubt because of this independence of spirit, he never got to receive any recompense from the Floralia, apart from one minor one, for a poem to King Henry IV, in French. Noticed by the towns governor, Adrien de Montluc-Montesquiou, he became the writer of poetry and popular shows at the time of carnivals in Toulouse (he played music and danced). From 1617 he published under the protection of the local big-wigs (Monluc), then Henri II de Montmorency, diverse pieces of a Baroque eclectism, often stuffed with double senses and full of inventiveness. The town was then noted for the disorder of the rule of Marie de Médicis who between 1610 and 1617 allowed a great liberty of tone. The progressive rate of royalty by Louis XIII from 1617 was marked in Toulouse by the execution of Giulio Cesare Vanini (1619), and by that, in 1632 of Henri II de Montmorency who revolted against Louis XIII. From then, without a protector, in a town marked by black years (plague, war...) Godolin was the victim of a new edition of his works which appeared in 1637, against his will. He had it replaced by a new publication from 1738, in which he sorted out the texts and corrected a passage where he was made to celebrate the victory of the king against the rebellion, where Goudouli chose only to celebrate the spring of returned peace. A pension of 300 livres was voted for him by the town at the end of his life which he spent with the Carmelites. The definitive publication of his Ramelet Moundi was in 1648.

== The author or Ramelet Moundi ==
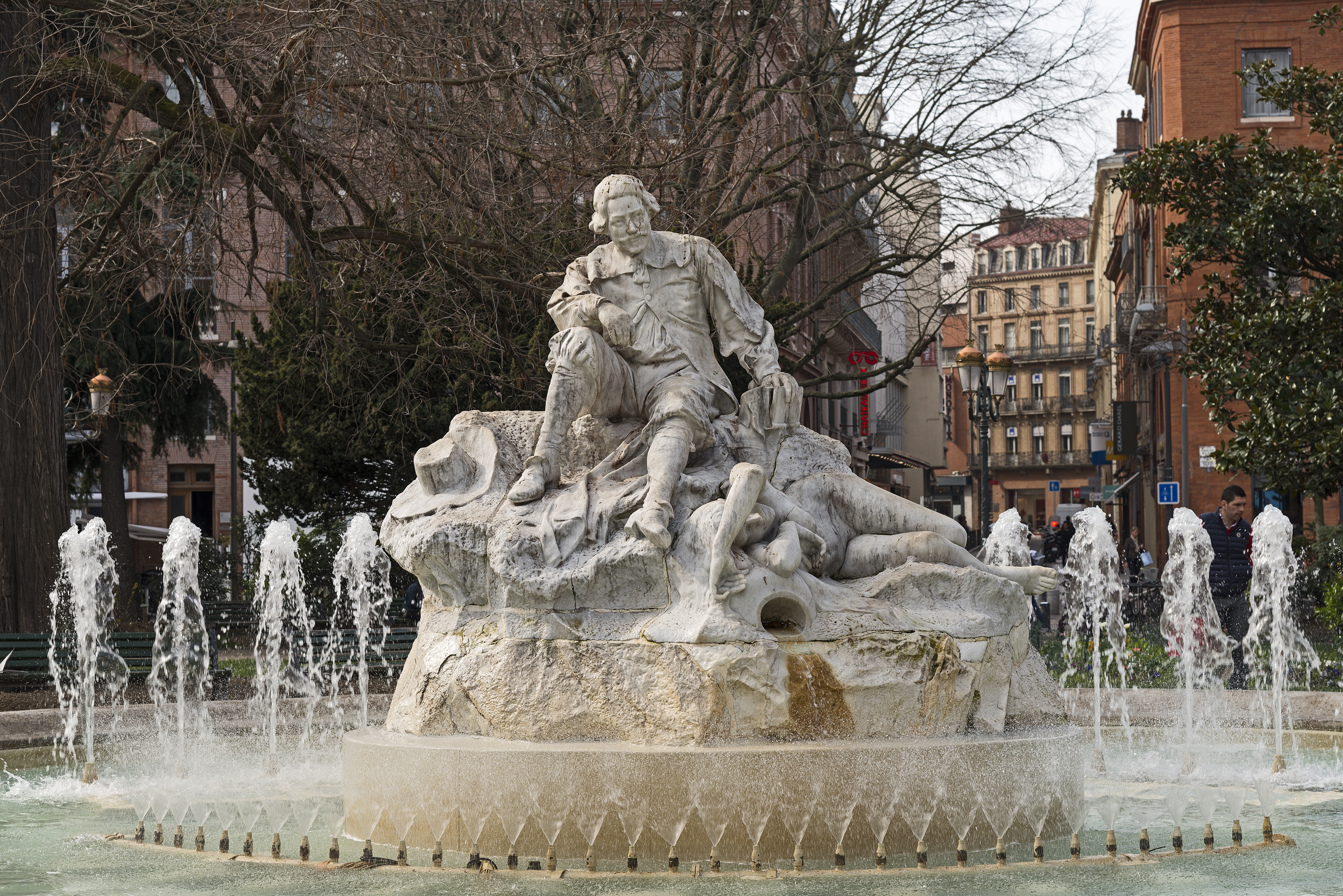
Statue in memory of Pierre Goudouli in Toulouse

His masterpiece is The Ramelet Moundi, which can be translated as The Toulouse Bouquet, but which is a title with multiple meanings: the Ramelet is also '"the branch, the twig", and "Moundi" is a play on words with Moundi = Raymond, the forename of the Counts of Toulouse, but also "the world", even "my God", and also "mon dire"="that which I say". The publication of this eclectic collection written in Occitan was from 1617 to 1648. It contains odes, stanzas (of which A l'hurouso memorio d'Henric le Gran, or To the happy memory of Henry the Great, written in honour of King Henry IV of France, sonnets, quatrains and others (carnivalesque prose, drinking songs, Christmas carols etc.) He also wrote carnivals.

Emulating a school of local poetry close to the Baroque æsthetics of Théophile de Viau, of the writing of Mathurin Regnier and of the epicurean spirit of Michel de Montaigne, a well known poet of the 17th century, Godolin saw his works regularly published (20 editions in the 17th century. Some passages of Molière (who was in Toulouse in 1649) or of Savinien Cyrano de Bergerac were inspired by his writing. He is always the victim, for posterity, at once, of his language and of the falling out of fashion of the humour and the profuse liberty of the Baroque since François de Malherbe. Goudouli is in effect a double contradiction with the politics of control of the language and he letters of Cardinal Richelieu who created a centralised language at the Académie française, and repressed writers such as Théophile de Viau.

Goudouli is then often forgotten. But he is from time to time celebrated as a precursor of classicism (1678), as a carrier of the common local spirit, as a symbol of the Occitan poetry, a link between the poetry of the troubadours and the Félibrige movement, (Frédéric Mistral), as a glory of Toulouse, as a spokesman of the aristocracy (Jean Jaurès 1909), then after the 1960s as the singer of open cultural independence, Goudouli is regularly rediscovered.

Many monuments and statues have been made in his honour, for example at Fenouillet. That of the Illustrious at the Capitol of Toulouse, is the work of the Occitan sculptor Antonin Carlès. The one in place Wilson (Woodrow Wilson Square), Toulouse, is one of the statues the best known by the people of Toulouse, this statue was made by Falguière.

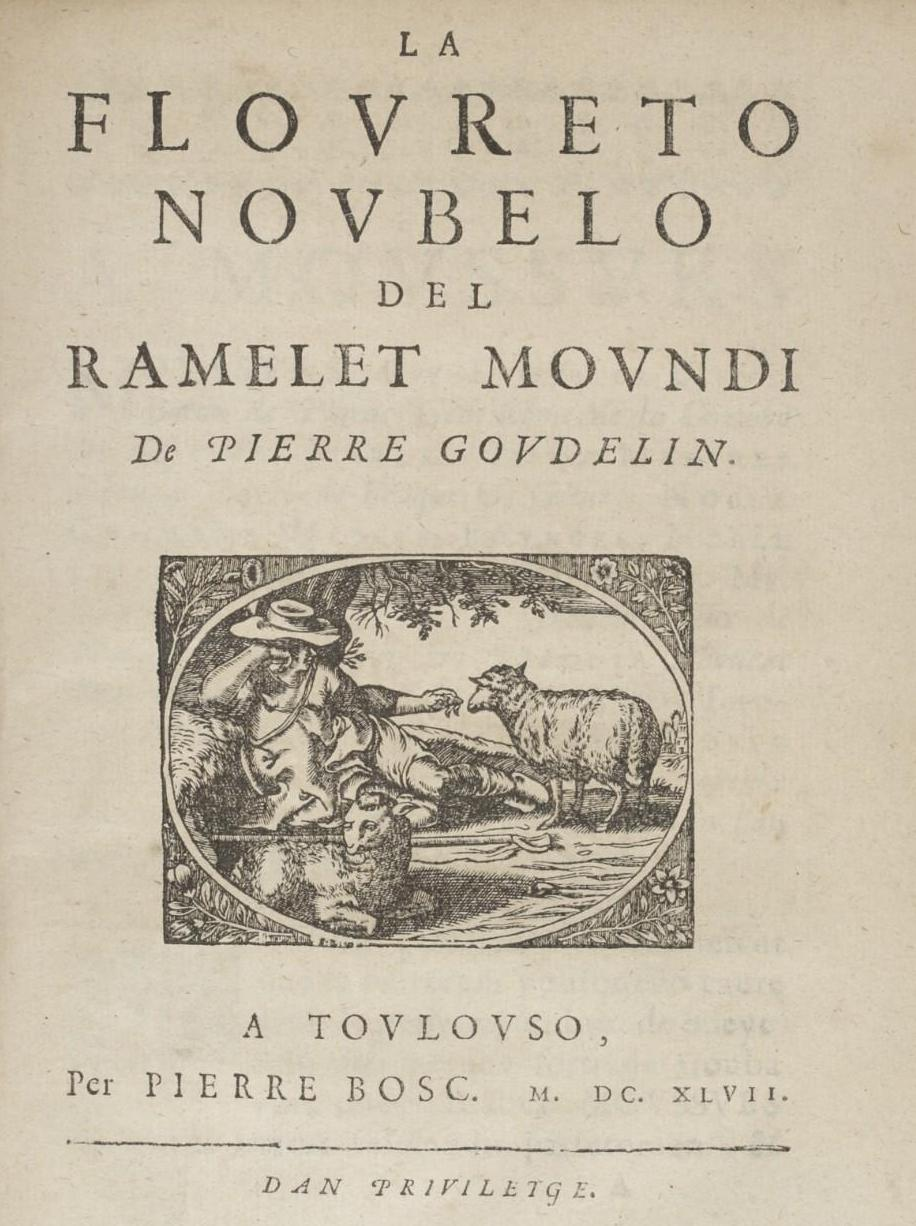
Cover of the 1647 edition of Ramelet Moundi

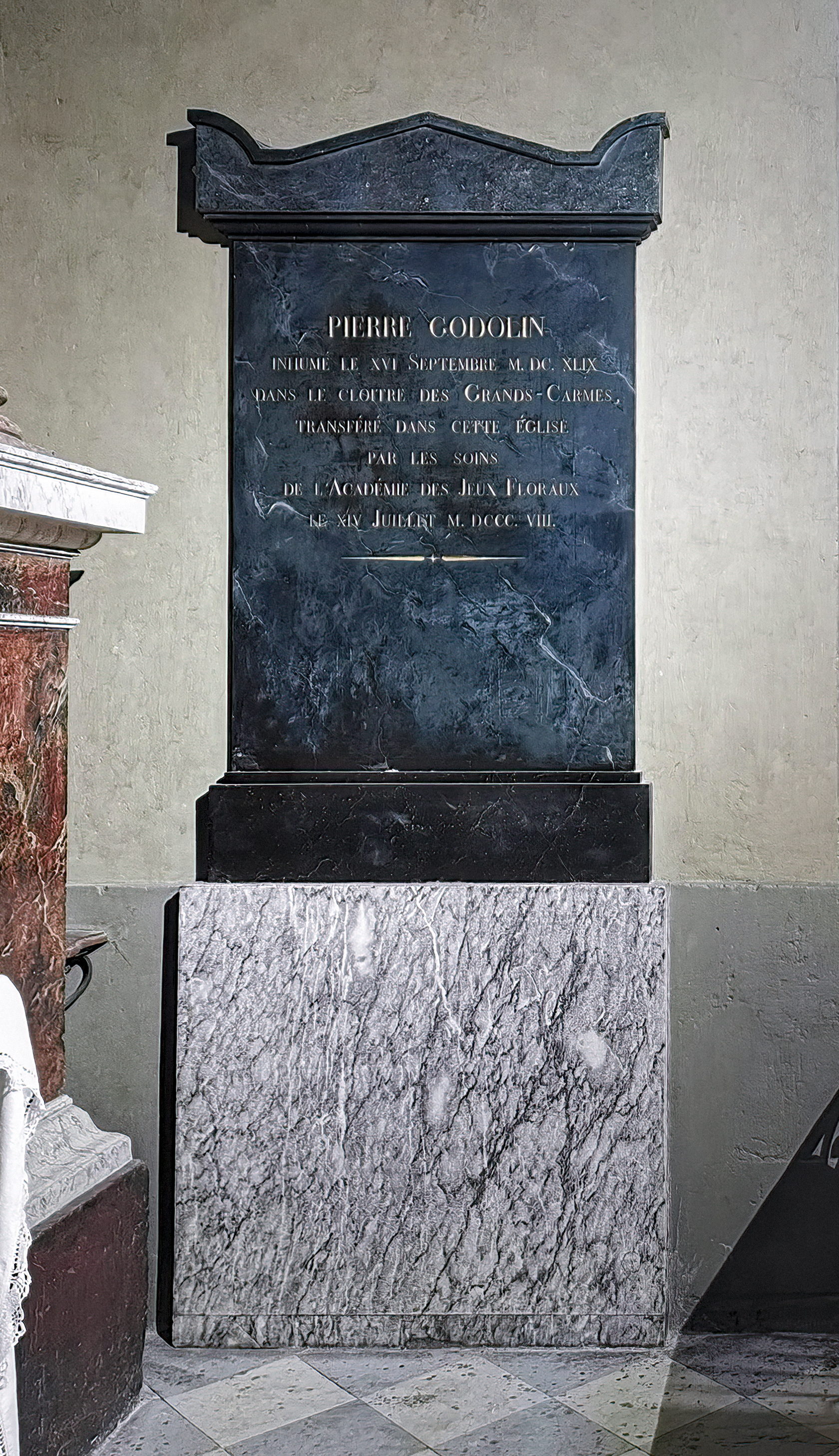
His tomb in the Basilica of Notre Dame de la Daurade in Toulouse

=== Extract from Ramelet Moundi ===
La pastouro Liriz es ta jantio et poulido
Que s'en posco trouba jouts la capo del cèl;
As fredous qu'elo fa sur un ayre noubèl
La sereno de mar se troubariô rabido.

(Liris* the shepherdess is more gentle and pretty
Than can be found under the cover of the sky;
With the vibratos which she makes on a new air
The siren of the sea would be ravished.)
(*Liris was the only love of Pèire Godolin)

D'un quicom de beziat sa paraulo seguido,
Un guignou frizoutat que se tors en anèl,
Un lambrec amorous qu'escapo de soun èl
Sur tout autro beautat la tenen acoumplido.

(A touch of the exquisite mixed with everything she says,
A frisson which twists in a circle,
A loving glint that escapes from her eye
Onto any other beauty make hers complete.)

Simple mès coutinaut es soun habillomen,
Et d'aqui me reben un gran countentomen
Car atal elo par plus gentilo et bragardo.

(Her clothing is simple but attractive,
Which makes me very happy:
Because then she is more gently and charming.)

Douncos en preferan le naturel à l'art
Talèau qu'en coumpagniô la bezi sense fard
Yeu bouldriô cap et cap la beze sense fardo.

(Also, I prefer the natural over the artifice,
As soon as I see her without make-up,
I want to kiss her without clothing.)

== See also ==
- Listing of the works of Alexandre Falguière
- Le Ramelet Moundi (1617-1648)
- Les Obros (The Works) (1647)
