= Louis Stromeyer =

German surgeon (1804–1876)

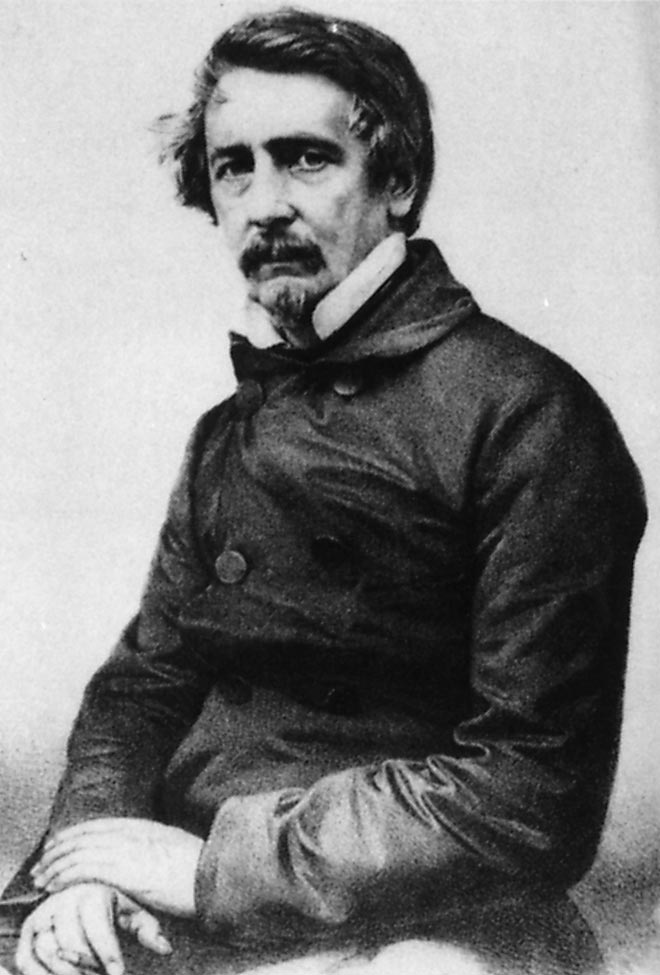
Louis Stromeyer

Georg Friedrich Louis Stromeyer (6 March 1804 – 15 June 1876) was a German surgeon. He was born and died in Hanover. He was the son of surgeon Christian Friedrich Stromeyer (1761–1824).

== Biography ==
From 1823, Stromeyer studied medicine at the University of Göttingen, receiving his doctorate at the Friedrich Wilhelm University of Berlin in 1826. In Göttingen, he joined the German student Corps Hannovera. After graduation, he undertook scientific travels throughout Europe, returning to Hanover in 1828, where he taught classes at the surgical school and founded an orthopedic institute. From 1838 to 1840, he was a professor of surgery at the University of Erlangen, followed by professorships at the Ludwig-Maximilians-Universität München (1841–42), the University of Freiburg (1842–48), and Kiel University.

During his career Stromeyer was Surgeon General of the Schleswig-Holstein and Hanoverian armies. During the Franco-Prussian War he served as Consultierender Generalarzt at the Battle of Sedan.

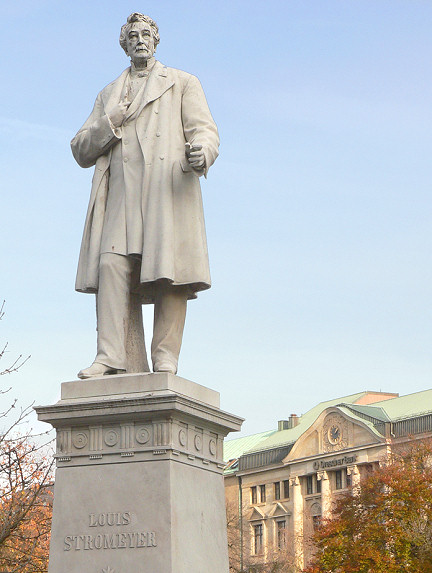
Stromeyer monument in Hanover's city center

Stromeyer was a pioneer in orthopedics and orthopedic surgery. In 1831, he performed the first subcutaneous tenotomy (tendon surgery) of the Achilles tendon on a deformed foot. He introduced tenotomic surgery to England through a friend, English surgeon William John Little (1810–1894). Stromeyer performed the operation on Dr. Little in order to correct a clubfoot condition. Stromeyer was also a practitioner of maxillofacial surgery, being remembered for the eponymous "Stromeyer hook", a device used for zygomatic arch fractures.

He was elected as a member of the American Philosophical Society in 1862.

His daughter Helene Marie Stromeyer became a known painter.

== Works ==
- Beiträge zur operativen Orthopädik; oder, Erfahrungen über die subcutane Durchschneidung verkürzter Muskeln und deren Sehnen, 1838.
- Handbuch der Chirurgie, 1844.
- Maximen der Kriegsheilkunst, 1855.
- "Gunshot fractures"; (published in English); Philadelphia, Lippincott, 1862.
- Erinnerungen eines deutschen Arztes, two volumes, 1875, ISBN 3-540-07659-X

== Sources ==
- WorldCat Identities publications
