= List of works by Alexandre Falguière =

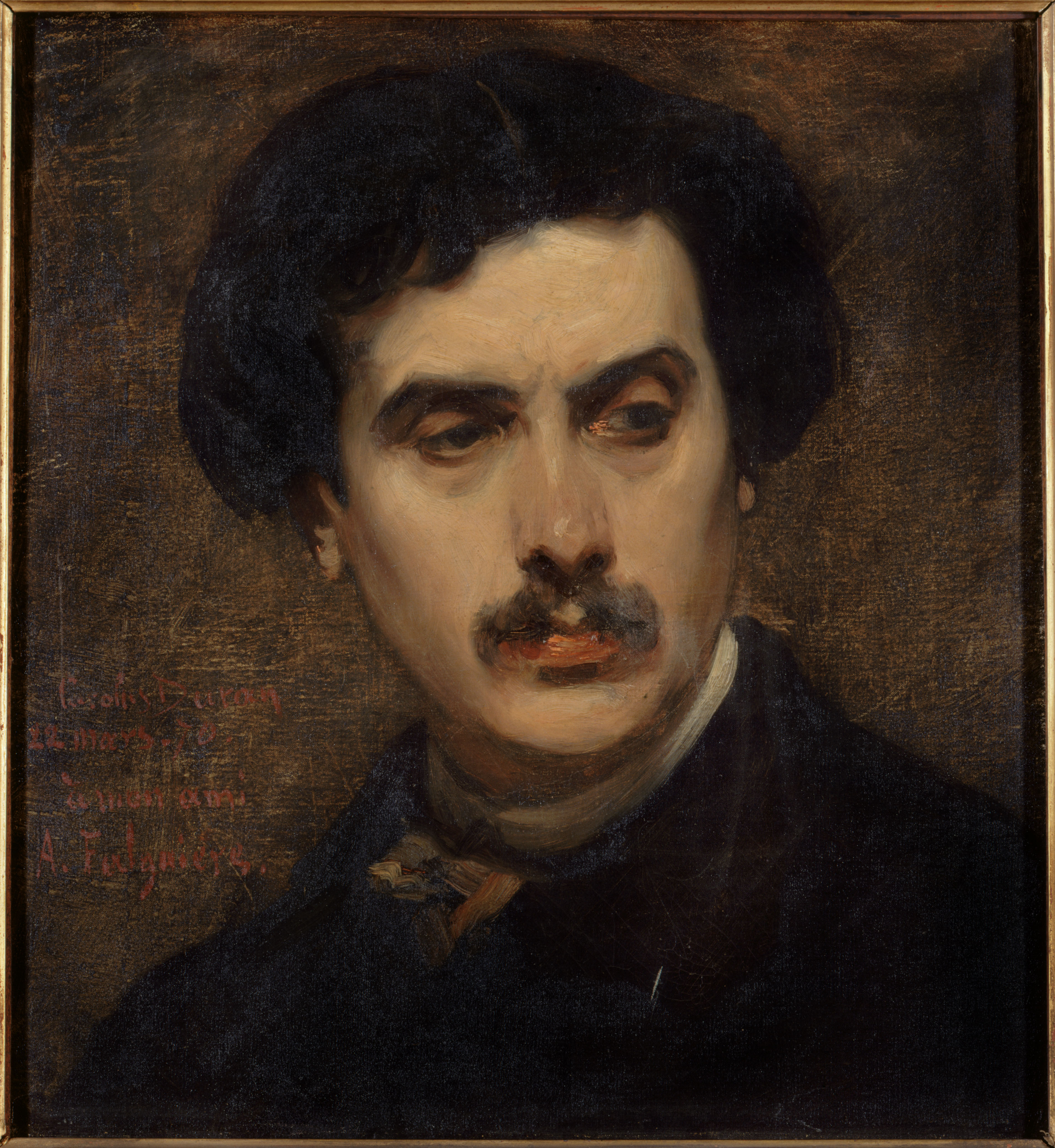
Portrait of Alexandre Falguière

This is a list of some of the works by the French artist Alexandre Falguière.

== Biography ==
Falguière was born in Toulouse on 7 September 1831 into a modest home, his father working as a mason. His father did, however manage to put him into the Toulouse École des Beaux-Arts where he studied both painting and sculpture and in 1853 was awarded the Toulouse municipal prize for sculpture, which allowed him to study at the Beaux-Arts in Paris, with Toulouse making a contribution towards payment of his fees and expenses. Once he arrived in Paris he worked in the studio of Albert-Ernest Carrier-Belleuse so that he could earn some extra cash to supplement the Toulouse funds and then moved to Jean-Louis Chenillon's studio. In 1854 he finally entered the École des Beaux-Arts and there won the Prix de Rome in 1859. He was then 23 years of age, so very near the Prix de Rome age limit. Winning this prestigious prize not only gave him a welcome bursary and access to further funds, but allowed him to travel to and study in Rome and whilst there he executed several pieces. The first piece he sent back to France was a bas-relief entitled "Des Joueurs de cerceau" and then "Thésée enfant", a work in marble and his first work accepted by the Salon. He also completed in Rome the work "Omphale" worked in marble, and "Nuccia la trastecerina". both of which made the Salon, the latter being purchased by the State. It was however his 1864 submission to the Salon called "le Vainqueur au combat de coqs" which was to make his reputation. When he returned to Paris from Rome in 1867, his work was already well known and highly regarded and he sealed this with his Salon submission "Tracisius". Now from his small studio in the rue de l'Ouest, later called the rue d'Assas, he produced work after work. In 1868 he was awarded the Medal of Honour at the Paris Salon and was appointed Officer of the Légion of Honor in 1878, in 1889 becoming a "commandeur" of that order. He had been made a member of the Académie française in 1882 and in the same year was made professor at the École des Beaux-arts. In 1870, with Paris under siege by the Prussian army, Alexandre Falguière enrolled in the National Guard and it was at this time that he made a sculpture from snow called "La Résistance" a work celebrated by the poets Théodore de Banville and Théophile Gautier, both fellow members of the guard. The 1880s saw a huge demand for statues, France being gripped by "statuomanie" and Falguière was swamped by commissions. By the end of his life Falguière was running five studios and had many pupils including Idrac, Injalbert, Marqueste, Théodore-Rivière and Antonin Mercié. His output was prolific, many of his compositions being repeated in various materials and sizes. Many of his original plaster works were cast in bronze or sculpted in marble so that the same work can be seen in various locations, albeit in different materials and of different dimensions and many of his maquettes are preserved in museums.

From 8 February to 8 March 1902, a major exhibition of Falguière's work was held at the École National des Beaux-Arts in Paris and Falguière's widow asked G Larroumet, a long time friend of Falguière and permanent secretary of the École, to write a preface in the exhibition catalogue. We are fortunate that this can be read on-line and some of the information in the catalogue is used in this article.

== Early works ==
Name	Location	Photograph	Date	Notes
Faune à la grappe	Toulouse, Musée des Augustins	Faune à la grappe	1855	
Thésée enfant	Toulouse, Musée des Augustins		1857	Falguière made his debut at the Paris Salon with this statuette in plaster.
Mézence blessé, préservé par l'intrépidité de son fils Lausus	Paris, École nationale supérieure des Beaux-Arts		1859	It was with this plaster bas-relief that Falguière won the Prix de Rome in 1859. Falguière then travelled to Rome and at the villa Médicis there became a friend of fellow French sculptor Jean-Baptiste Carpeaux. He spent time in Tuscany and there discovered the works of the Florentine renaissance and became so inspired that together with fellow sculptors Paul Dubois and Henri Chapu he formed the group which called itself the "Néo-Florentins"
Joueurs de cerceau	Unknown		1860	An early work by Falguière
Le Vainqueur au Combat de Coqs	Toulouse, Musée des Augustins	Alexandre Falguière - Le Vainqueur au combat de coqs - Musée des Augustins - RA 1146	1864	This work was completed in 1864 and was Falguière's first bronze statue of importance. The plaster model was completed in 1863 and the bronze version was exhibited at the Salon des Artistes français in 1864 and received a medal. Victor Thiébaut carried out the casting. From 1883 to 1884, the statue stood in the garden of the Grand-Rond but was then moved into the Musée des Augustins and a copy kept in the museum's garden. "Le Vainqueur au Combat de Coqs" was inspired by Jean de Bologne's "Le Mercure".
Tarcisius, martyr crétian	Paris, Musée d'Orsay		1867	This work was Falguière's submission to the Paris Salon of 1868. Together with "Le Vainqueur au Combat de Coqs" it was also exhibited in the Luxembourg Museum. Both "Le Vainqueur au Combat de Coqs" and "Tarcisius, martyr crétian" are now in the Musée d'Orsay.
À la porte de l'école	Toulouse, Musée des Augustins	Alexandre Falguière - A la porte de l'école - Musée des Augustins - RA 955	1887	This work in plaster, shown at the Paris Salon of 1887, was unusual in that Falguière moved away from his usual depictions of nymphes, gods and goddesses and famous people and here depicted an ordinary woman with her two children at the entrance to a local school. The mother carries a small baby who she shows to her young daughter who embraces the baby before going into school.

== Works located in Paris ==
Name	Location	Photograph	Date	Notes
Pégase emportant le poète vers les régions du rêve	Paris, Square Louis Jouvet			
Statue of Archimedes	Paris			In the main entrance hall of the Sorbonne in Paris and looking out on to Rue des Écoles are two statues representing the Arts and the Sciences. These are "Homer" by E. Delaplanche and "Archimedes" by Falguière.
Statue of Honoré de Balzac	Paris, Avenue de Friedland		1899	This piece was submitted to the Paris Salon in 1899 and the maquette is held in the Maison de Balzac.
Statue of Pierre Corneille and other Falguière works in Paris' Comédie Française	Paris		1878	Alexandre Falguière submitted a study of this great French dramatist to the Salon of 1878, indicating that the marble work was destined for the Comédie Française and in " Albums des salons du XIXe siècle; salon de 1883" which detailed various works purchased by the French State, the Corneiile work was included- "Pierre Corneille", statue, marbre (Salon de 1878) par Alexandre Falguière, No 981, pour la Comédie Française, l'oeuvre mesure H. 1, 55 x L. 0, 80 x P. 1, 10 m". The Corneille work is now held in the Comédie Française's collection which includes other works by Falguière. These works were all catalogued by the Bibliothèque-Musée and as a tribute to La Grange who was a comedian and longtime companion of Molière and had compiled a register of the life and activities of the 1659 Molière group of actors, the collection's exhaustive catalogue was named after him. The Falguière works held by the Comédie Française are-: "La Source". An 1880 composition. A bronze statuette. Shown 5 February to 31 March at the Musée des Beaux-Arts du Québec in Québec as part of the exhibition "Ingres et les Modernes".; Bust of Victor Hugo. Bronze cast by Thiébaut Freres. Shown in 1974–1976 at an exhibition staged by La Comédie Française.; Bust of Mary Kalb. This work is in marble. It was shown at the Paris Salon of 1884.; Statue of Pierre Corneille. 1878 study of a seated Pierre Corneille.; Bust of Coquelin cadet. Work in marble dating to 1886.; Bust of Victor Hugo. Work dated 1890. This plaster bust was shown at the exhibition 13 October 2011 to 15 January 2012 under the title "La Comédie-Française s'expose au Petit Palais". and Comédie-Française used this bust for the ceremony marking the 1902 centenary of Victor Hugo and then had it cast in bronze fearing it would otherwise break.
Asie	Paris, Musée d'Orsay (forecourt)	2017 L'Asie. Alexandre Falguière. Exposition Universelle 1878. Paris P38	1878	For the Exposition Universelle in Paris in 1878, a series of six statues were commissioned, each depicting one of the continents. Falguière contributed Asia.
Monument to Ambroise Thomas	Paris, Parc Monceau	Statue d'Ambroise Thomas	1902	Thomas, a French composer, is shown sitting in meditative mood, whilst Mignon, one of his heroines offers him flowers.
Monument Georges Bizet	Paris, Opéra Comique			Opéra Comique's "Salle Bizet" contains Falguière's monument to Bizet. In Falguière's composition Bizet is embraced by an allegory of music whilst a depiction of Carmen sits at his feet. Bizet had been a close friend of Falguière who loved music and loved to sing. He had a fine tenor voice
"L'inspiration guidée par la sagesse"	Paris, Palais de la Découverte			Cast in bronze in 1900 by the foundry Salin.
"Triomphe de la Révolution"	Museum of Grenoble			The Museum of Grenoble holds the maquette for Falguière's "Triomphe de la Révolution", an elaborate quadriga which depicts a chariot drawn by horses preparing to "crush Anarchy and Despotism". A large plaster version was placed on the top of the Arc de Triomphe from 1882 to 1886 until it crumbled. A version in bronze, which could have endured exposure to the elements, was never commissioned. Only the maquette survives.
"Le Drame"	Paris, Palais Garnier		1860 to 1869	
Monument to Louis Pasteur	Paris, Place de Breteuil	Part of Falguière's Louis Pasteur monument.		This monument pays tribute to Louis Pasteur. It was Falguière's final work, being completed in 1900. Pasteur is depicted seated and wearing a dressing gown and surrounded by various sculptural groupings which underline his achievements. Falguière includes the figure of Death himself and near to a mother and her child but, thanks to Pasteur, death is no longer so powerful and less likely to harm them. Elsewhere we see a young woman convalescing and cattle and sheep, the latter with a shepherd. Victor Peter helped to finish this monument.

=== Works in Musée d'Orsay ===
There are many Falguiere works in Paris' Musée d'Orsay. These include:

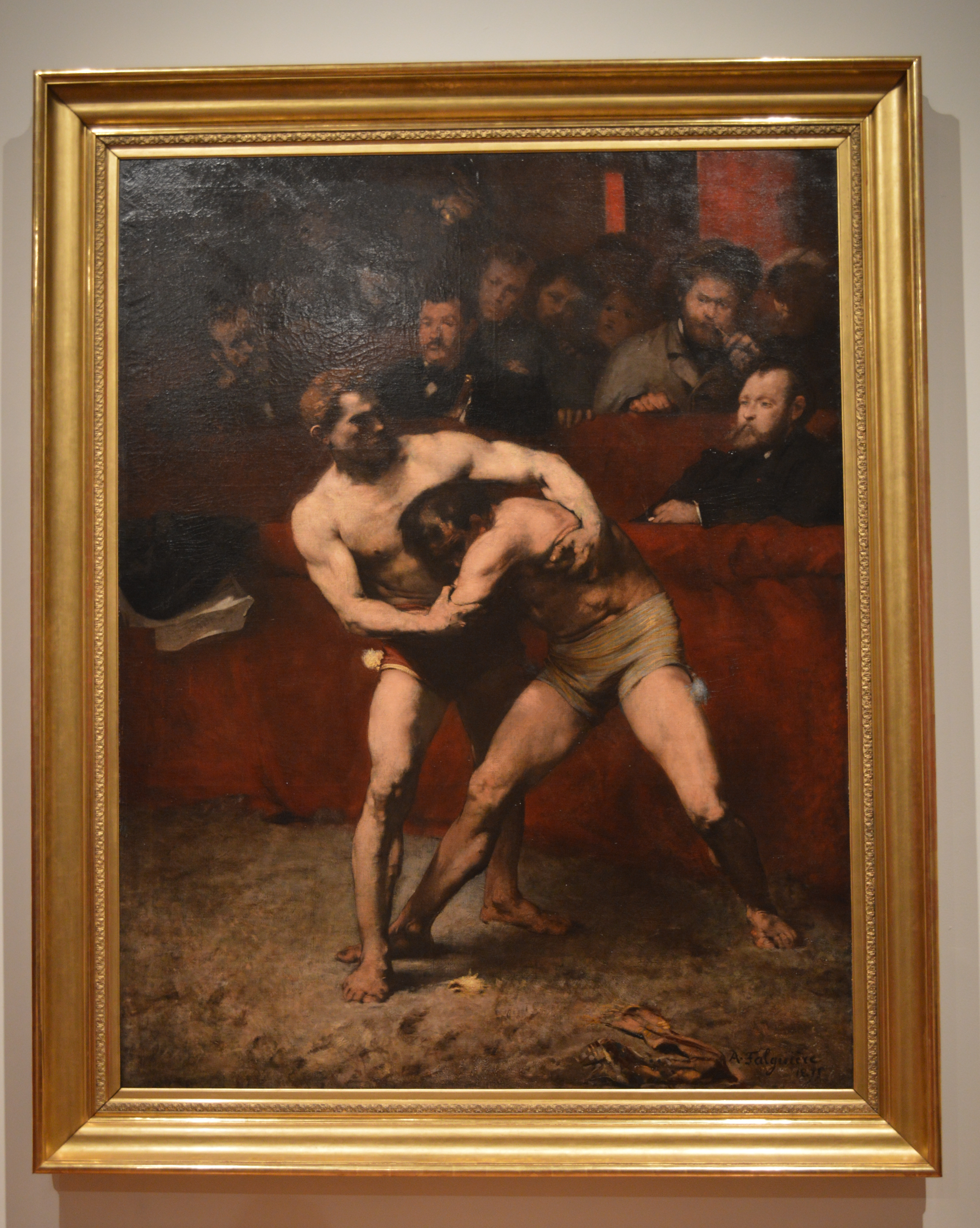
The wrestlers

- The wrestlers

An 1875 painting.

- Eve

This composition depicting Eve and a serpent was completed around 1880. The museum hold a plaster version. A large version in marble was shown at the Paris Salon of 1880 and this is now held in Copenhagen's Ny Carlsberg Glyptotek.

- Baronne Daumesnil

This marble bust dates to 1879. The Musée d'Orsay also hold the plaster model and a version in terracotta can be seen in the Musée of Périgord, Périgueux, and a bronze version is held by Bayonne's Musée Bonnat. The work has two inscriptions: "DONNE A LA FRANCE PAR SA PETITE FILLE / LA VICOMTESSE THERESE DE CLAIRVAL NEE MORIZOT" and "ANNE FORTUNEE LEONIE GARAT BARONNE DAUMESNIL / SURINTENDANTE DE LA LEGION D'HONNEUR". Until 1891 the work was held in the collection of the Vicomtesse Thérèse de Clairval, née Morizot and was then presented as a gift to the French nation. From 1891 to 1916 it was held by the Musée du Luxembourg in Paris, and from 1916 to 1956 was held by the Musée du Louvre, Paris. In 1986 it was taken into the Musée d'Orsay.

- La danseuse

A marble version was shown at the Salon in 1896 and at the 1902 Falguière retrospective

- Bust of Léon Gambetta

Thought to date to around 1895, this bronze bust of Léon Gambetta was cast by Thiébaut. The Musée d'Orsay also hold the version in terracotta dating to 1882. Other terracotta versions are to be found in the Musée Granet in Aix-en-Provence and the Musée Carnavalet in Paris and another Thiébaut bronze is to be seen in the Musée de Picardie in Amiens. There is a bronze cast by Bingen in the Indiana University museum, Bloomington and Sèvres brought out a biscuit version. A marble version is in the Palais du Sénat in Paris and there are of course the full scale monuments to Gambetta in Cahors and Saïgon.

- Bust of woman entitled "Pompadour"

A wax version of this Falguière piece can be seen in the Petit Palais in Paris held under the title "Mme X dans le goût du XVIIIe", and Sèvres sold a biscuit version from 1907 to 1941 under the name "La Pompadour".

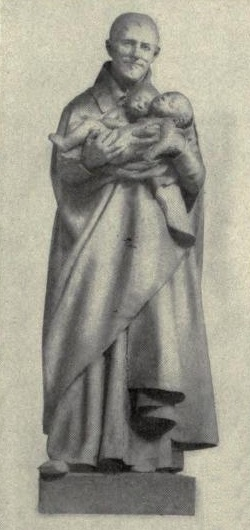
Saint Vincent de Paul

- Saint Vincent de Paul

This work in marble is thought to date to 1879 when it was shown at the Salon de la Société des artistes français. It was then shown at the Paris Exposition of 1883. The foundry Thiébaut cast a bronze version and another of just the bust. On the pedestal of this marble work the inscription reads: :St VINCENT DE PAUL/1591-1660/APOTRE DE LA CHARITÉ/CURÉ DE CLICHY/1612-1625" The sculpture was held from 1879 to 1944 in the Panthéon in Paris, then by the Église de Saint-Médard in Clichy until 1986 when it was passed to the Musée d'Orsay.

- Pégase emportant le poète vers les régions du rêve

Falguière executed this work depicting Apollon riding on Pégase between 1880 and 1897 and the Musée d'Orsay hold the plaster model. The model was made for a secret competition in 1880 for designs for the proposed monument to Victor Hugo in Paris, a commission which went to Barrias. A bronze of this sculpture was submitted to the Salon in 1897 and that bronze is now located in the Square de l'Opéra-Louis-Jouvet. A smaller version of the work, 71 centimetres high, was cast in bronze by Thiébaut frères, Fumière et Gavignot.

- Vainqueur à la course

The Musée d'Orsay have an 1870 version of this Falguière composition and there is a bronze version in the Jardin des Tuileries in Paris. The work was purchased from the Salon by the State in 1870 and in 1871 was exhibited at the Musée du Luxembourg. After being held in various locations it was finally taken into the Musée d'Orsay in 1986.

- Tarcisius, martyr chrétien

The Musée d'Orsay hold an 1868 marble version of this work. The plaster model was purchased by the State from the Salon of 1867 and shown at the "l'Exposition Universelle" from 1867 to 1900. It is held by the Musée des Augustins in Toulouse,. A mask of Tarcisius is held by the Petit Palais in Paris and other plaster versions are held by Ny Carlsberg Glyptotek in Copenhagen as well as in Toulouse. There is a bronze version at the Detroit Institute of Arts.

== Works outside of Paris ==
Name	Location	Photograph	Date	Notes
Monument to Admiral Amédée Courbet	Abbeville, Place de l'Amiral Courbet			Falguière worked with Antonin Mercié on this statue. It was damaged in a bombing raid during the 1914–1918 war and was not restored. A medal was struck celebrating the monument.
Statue of David d'Angers	Angers		1878	The Musée des beaux-arts in Angers holds the original model submitted by Falguière for the competition held to select the sculptor of a tribute to David d'Angers.
Monument to Cardinal Lavigerie	Bayonne			This Falguière monument is in Bayonne, Lavigerie's birthplace. Lavigerie was a French cardinal, Archbishop of Carthage and Algiers, Primate of Africa and a significant figure in France's anti-slavery movement.
Statue of Pierre de Fermat	Beaumont-de-Lomagne			It was the mathematician Despeyrous, a citizen of Beaumont, who in 1881 offered a bronze statue of fellow mathematician Pierre de Fermat, by Falguière to the town of his birth. In 1943 the statue was taken and melted down for use in the manufacture of munitions. In 1954 the people of Beaumont and its mayor organized a replacement but in stone rather than bronze.
Monument to Léon Gambetta.	Cahors			The monument to Gambetta in Cahors had originally been an elaborate composition by Falguière but now comprises a statue of Gambetta on a pedestal. Originally there had been bronzes of a crouching marine in attacking mode, a draped flag and a wounded infantryman but these were taken in 1943 and melted down for the manufacture of armaments. The monument is in the centre of Cahors, in the Square François Mitterrand, close to the Allées Fenelon and the pedestal bears the simple inscription "à / [Léon] Gambetta / né à Cahors / le 2 avril 1838" Gambetta had died following an accident in 1882 and the monument was erected soon afterwards, being inaugurated on 14 April 1884 in the presence of Jules Ferry and Pierre Waldeck-Rousseau. In Falguière's composition, Gambetta's right arm rests on a cannon, presumably representing the French Revolutionary tradition of a "nation at arms" and recalling Gambetta's rôle in resisting Prussian military occupation after the Franco-Prussian War. His right arm is raised, as if he was in full, rhetorical flow, exhorting his Republican followers and the French nation more generally to take action. Indeed part of one of his rousing speeches is chiseled onto the plinth of the statue. "Français / Élevez vos âmes et vos résolutions à la / hauteur des effroyables périls qui / fondent sur la patrie / il dépend encore de nous de lasser [sic] la / mauvaise fortune et de montrer à l'univers / ce qu'est un grand peuple qui ne veut / pas périr et dont le courage s'exalte au / sein même des catastrophes" The monument area was designed by architect Paul Pujol and the statue was cast in the foundry of the Thiébaut brothers.
Death mask of Gambetta	Cahors		1882	The Musée de Cahors Henri Martin in Cahors have a death mask of Gambetta by Falguière.
Statue of Armand Barbès	Carcassonne		1886	This statue no longer exists. It was replaced by a statue by Claude Marquié.
La Sasson	Chambéry	La Sasson	1892	The monument in Chambéry in Savoie was erected in 1892 and inaugurated by Sadi Carnot the French president, as part of the celebrations celebrating the centenary of Savoie's absorption into France at the time of the French revolution. A Sasson is a native of Savoie. The Germans removed the statue in 1942 during the occupation but it was fully restored in 1982. The inscription reads " LA SASSON. STATUE DE LA SAVOIE COMMEMORANT LE CENTENAIRE DE L'ANNEXION DE LA SAVOIE A LA FRANCE 1792–1892. DEPOSEE SOUS L'OCCUPATION EN 1942 PUIS RETROUVEE / EN ALLEMAGNE ELLE FUT RESTAUREE ET REINSTALLEE / EN 1982. ŒUVRE D'ALEXANDRE FALGUIERE"
Monument à Jules Grévy	Dole			Bronze statue of Jules Grévy, erected in 1893 in the place Jules-Grévy. Removed in 1942 by the Vichy regime and the bronze melted down for the manufacture of armaments.
The villa "La Sapinière"	Évian-les-Bains			Jonas Vitta, a wealthy banker, commissioned the architect Jean Camille Formigé in 1892 to design this villa at Lake Léman near Evian-les-Bains. Jonas died in that year but his son, Baron Joseph, continued the villa's decoration, and commissioned work from sculptors Rodin, Georges Guardet, Falguière and Alexandre Charpentier and painters and engravers Paul-Albert Besnard, Félix Bracquemond and Jules Chéret. In the gallery below are photographs of some of Falguière's bas-reliefs which decorate the villa.
La Nymphe	Laon			The work "La Nymphe" was always called "Diane chasseresse" by Falguière and this bronze version is located along the Rampe d'Ardon in Laon in the Aisne. The Rampe d'Ardon is the winding road which takes one to the summit of the hill on which Laon sits. Cast in bronze by Thiébaut frères in 1882, it was given to Laon by the State in exchange for a painting by Vouet in 1885–1886. This is a good example of how a work by Falguière can appear in various locations, as apart from the Laon bronze the work also appears in Nogent- sur-Seine's Musée Paul Dubois-Alfred Boucher and the plaster version is held by the Musée des Beaux-Arts in Toulouse.
Monument to Lamartine	Mâcon	Monument to Lamartine in Mâcon		Lamartine, the French poet, full name Alphonse Marie Louis de Prat de Lamartine, was born in Mâcon and Falguière's statue was erected in front of the Mâcon Hôtel de Ville in 1878. Students of the writer, poet and politician believe he was instrumental in the foundation of the Second Republic
Monument to Louis-Toussaint Dassy	Marseille	noneMonument to Louis-Toussaint Dassy	Y	Louis-Toussaint Dassy was a missionary priest and historian who in his lifetime did much to help blind children. This monument was designed by Pujol and Falguière carried out the sculptural work involved. The monument is situated in the Jardin de la colline Pierre Puget in Marseille and the composition includes a young blind girl.
Bust of Jacques Mathieu Delpech	Montpellier		1860	This bust is located in the University of Montpellier's Medical Faculty. Delpech was a surgeon both in Toulouse and Paris before becoming Professor of Clinical Surgery at Montpellier. He was assassinated by one of his patients.
Sculpture of Augustin Calmet	Munster	noneThe tomb of Augustin Calmet		Calmet was born and died in Senones but had many associations with Munster and the above work marks his tomb in the Abbaye de Senones. A plaster version can be seen in Munster's town hall.
Monument du Président Sadi Carnot	Nolay		1895	This monument was conceived by the sculptor Jules Roulleau but finished by Falguière. The firm of Gandinot and Verdie of Charleville carried out the casting of the figure of Sadi Carnot and the monument's inauguration took place on 8 September 1895. The statue was destroyed during the Vichy regime and the bronze melted down.
Monument to Emmanuel d'Alzon	Nîmes		1893	Emmanuel d'Alzon (1810–1880) was a leading French cleric in the 19th century and Falguière's 1893 bronze sculpture shows Father d'Alzon on his knees and in prayer. It stands in the Collège d'Assumption in Nîmes. D'Alzon had founded the "Augustins de l'Assomption". The statue was erected on 28 June 1893 to celebrate the 50th anniversary of the Collège d'Assumption's foundation.
Statue of Alphonse Daudet	Nîmes		1900	This statue is in the Square de la Couronne in Nîmes. Daudet was a French novelist.
Monument to Jean Baptiste de La Salle	Rouen	The Jean Baptiste de La Salle monument in Rouen. Here we see two of the four children spaced about the monument's base.	1875	This monument and fountain in Rouen was built in the 1800s to celebrate Jean Baptiste de La Salle's enormous contributions to education. The statue was first erected in 1875 in the Place Carnot but was transferred to the quieter neighborhood of St. Sever because of the difficulties with traffic circulation in 1885. The bronze shows De La Salle teaching a young child whilst a second pupil is deeply engrossed in reading a book. Further sculptures of children are placed at the four corners of the monument representing the four corners of the earth. Falguière's bas-reliefs recall de La Salle's generosity in giving his possessions to the poor and that he was honored with a visit from James II at his boarding school in Paris.
Fountain	Rouen			In 1874 a retaining wall cum fountain was constructed in Rouen's rue Louis-Ricard / rue Sainte-Marie. Édouard de Perthes was the designing architect and Falguière was commissioned to carry out some sculptural decoration for this fountain. The underground reservoir was an important part of the work carried out between 1870 and 1874 to improve Rouen's water supply and after the construction of the reservoir was completed, a competition was held for the design and installation of a fountain which de Perthes and Falguière completed between 1874 and 1879. The fountain served as a retaining wall holding back the water in the reservoir. Falguière's work on the fountain included three groups of sculpture, with allegories of "L'Élevage", "the City of Rouen" and "Agriculture".
Statue of Henri de La Rochejaquelein	Saint-Aubin-de-Baubigné		1895	This Falguière work is located in Saint-Aubin-de-Baubigné. It was erected in honour of the counter-revolutionary Henri de La Rochejaquelein. He had lost his life at Nuaillé, near Cholet on 28 January 1794 at the age of 22. On the pedestal supporting his statue are engraved his celebrated words spoken at the Château de la Durbelière before 2000 soldiers. " Si j'avance, suivez-moi, si je recule tuez-moi, si je meurs vengez-moi" This translates as "If I advance, follow me, if I retreat kill me, if I die revenge me"
Monument to Pèire Godolin	Toulouse, Place Wilson	noneMonument to Godolin in Toulouse		In Falguière's composition, Godolin sits on a rock with his left hand resting on a book. His hat lies at his feet as well as a nude woman who holds a jar from which the fountain's water flows. This figure is thought to be an allegory for the river Garonne.
Monument to Charles Lavigerie	Toulouse, Musée des Augustins	Cardinal Lavigerie	1898	

=== Works held by the Musée des Augustins in Toulouse ===
==== List of works ====
- "La Suisse accueille l'Armee francaise". 1874 Plaster work.
- "La Resistance". 1870 Statuette in terracotta.
- "La Musique". 1891 high-relief in plaster.
- "La Musique".1889 Work in plaster.
- "La Femme au paon". Work in marble. Dates to 1890.
- "La Femme au paon". Work in plaster.
- "Femme au phénix". Bas-relief in bronze.
- "Baigneuse". A Plaster statuette.
- "Caïn et Abel". Work in terracotta.
- "Diane". Head in terracotta.
- "Diane". Head in terracotta.
- "Diane". Marble statue 175 centimetres high. This work was shown at the Salon in 1887.
- "Jean Abadie". Marble bust.
- "L'Automne". Marble statue.

==== Gallery ====
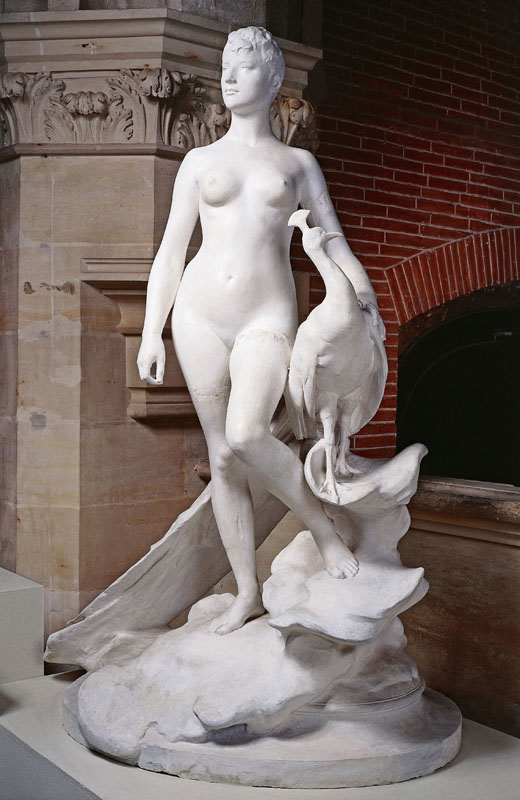
La Femme au paon

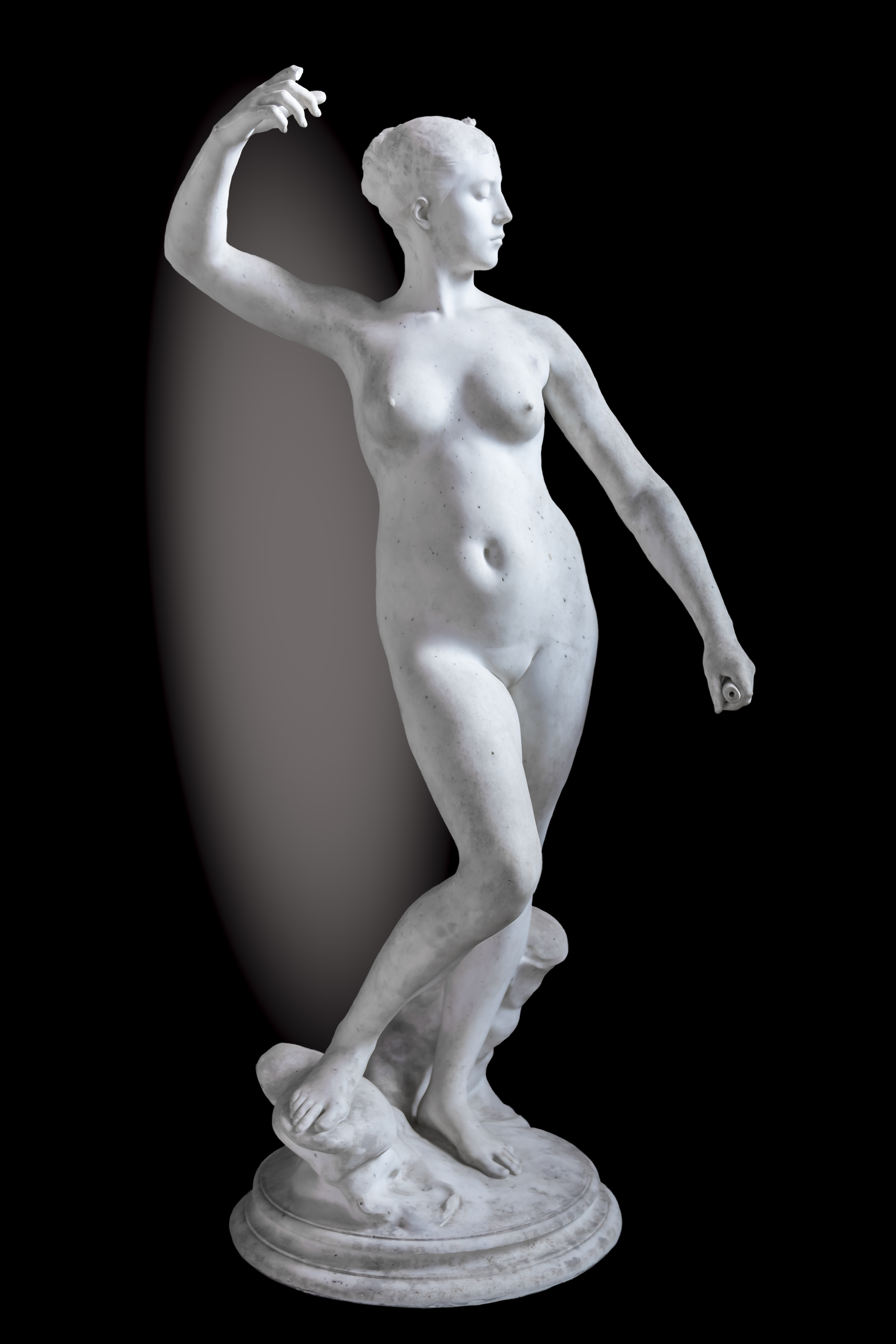
"Diane"

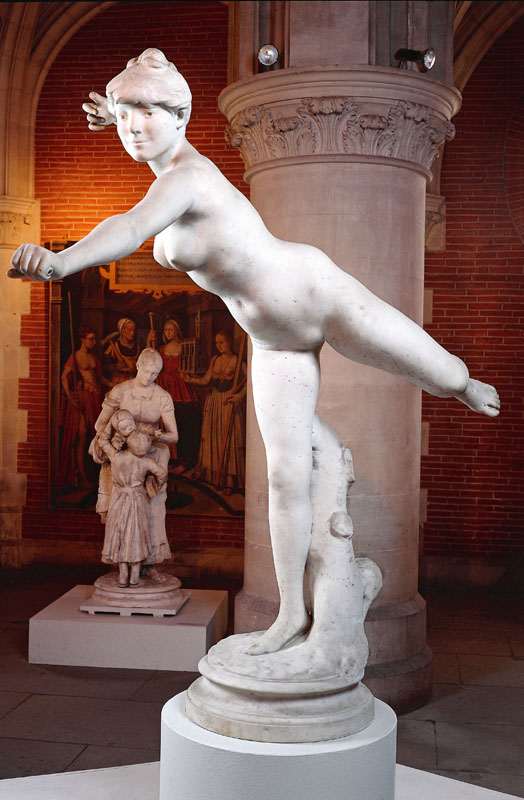
Nymphe chasseresse

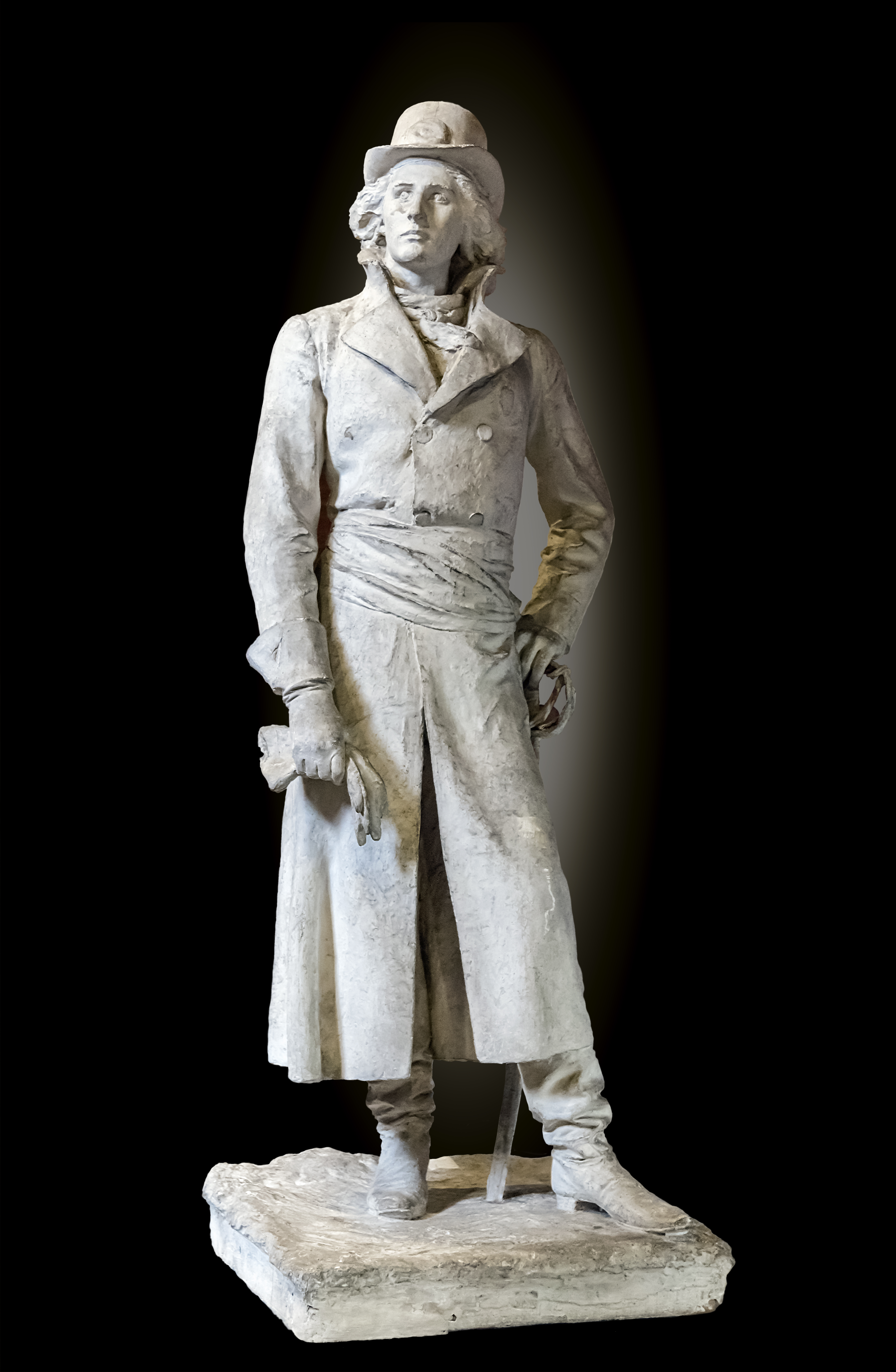
Henri de La Rochejaquelein.

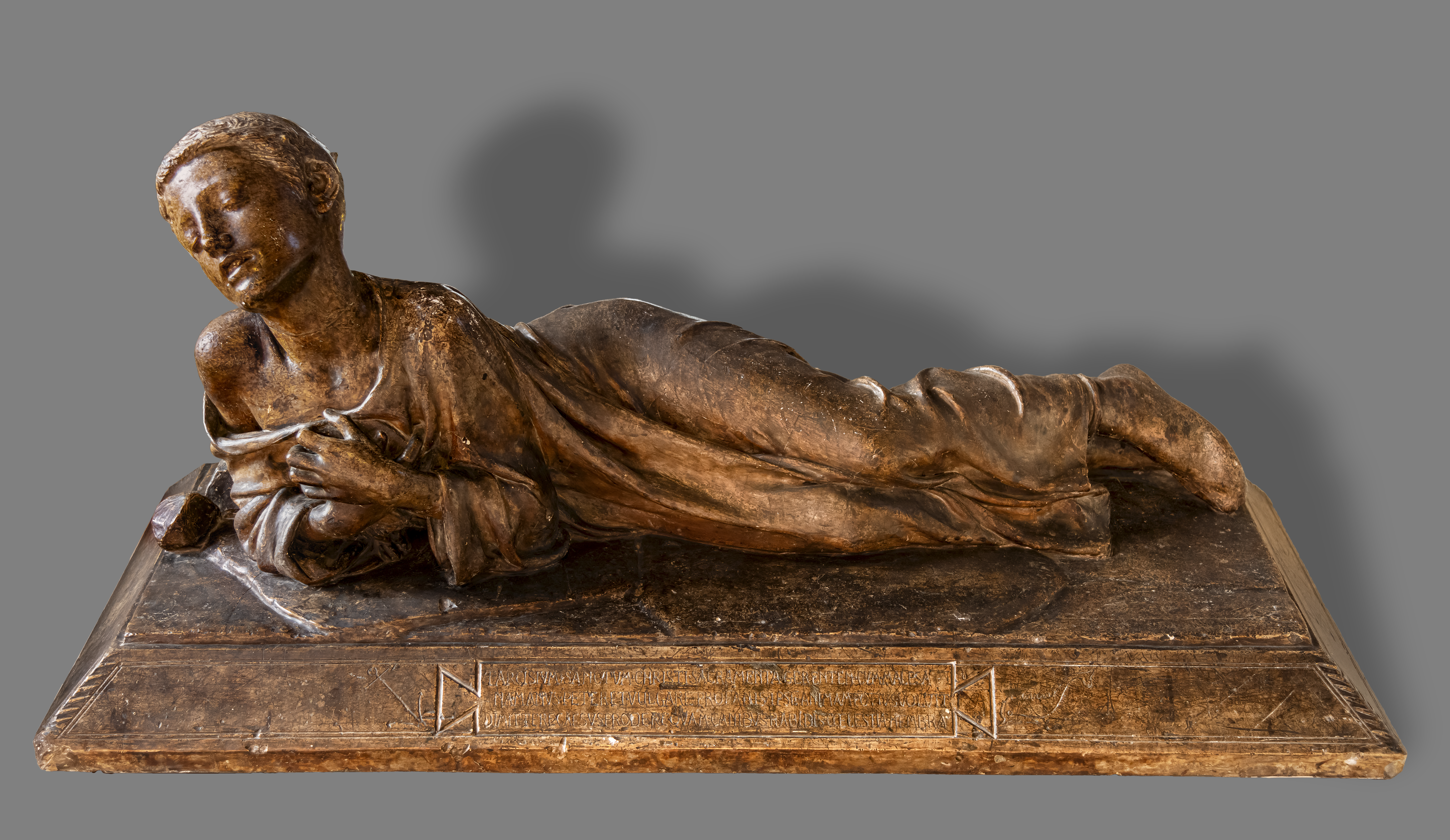
Tarcisius martyr chrétien.

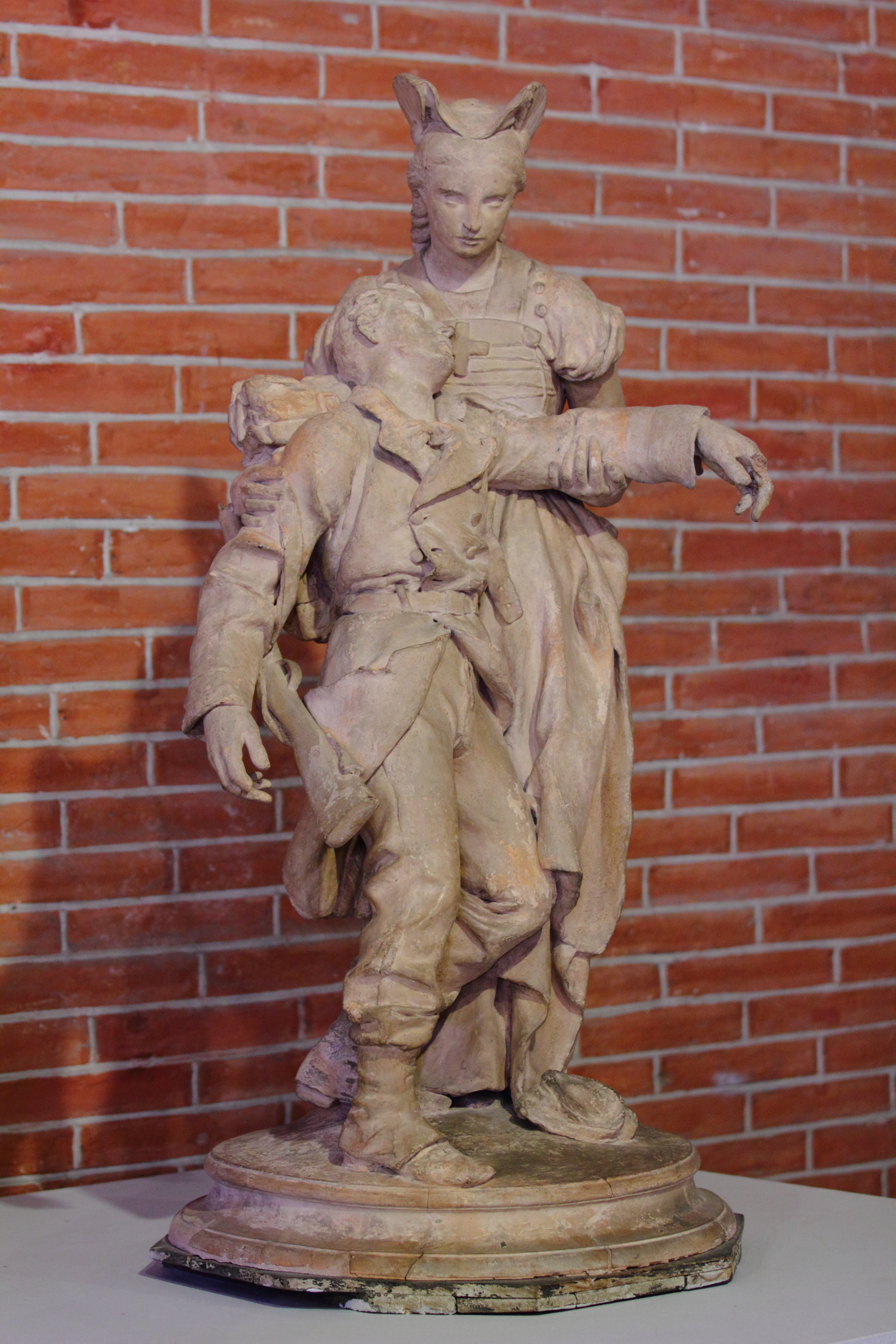
La Suisse accueille l'armée française

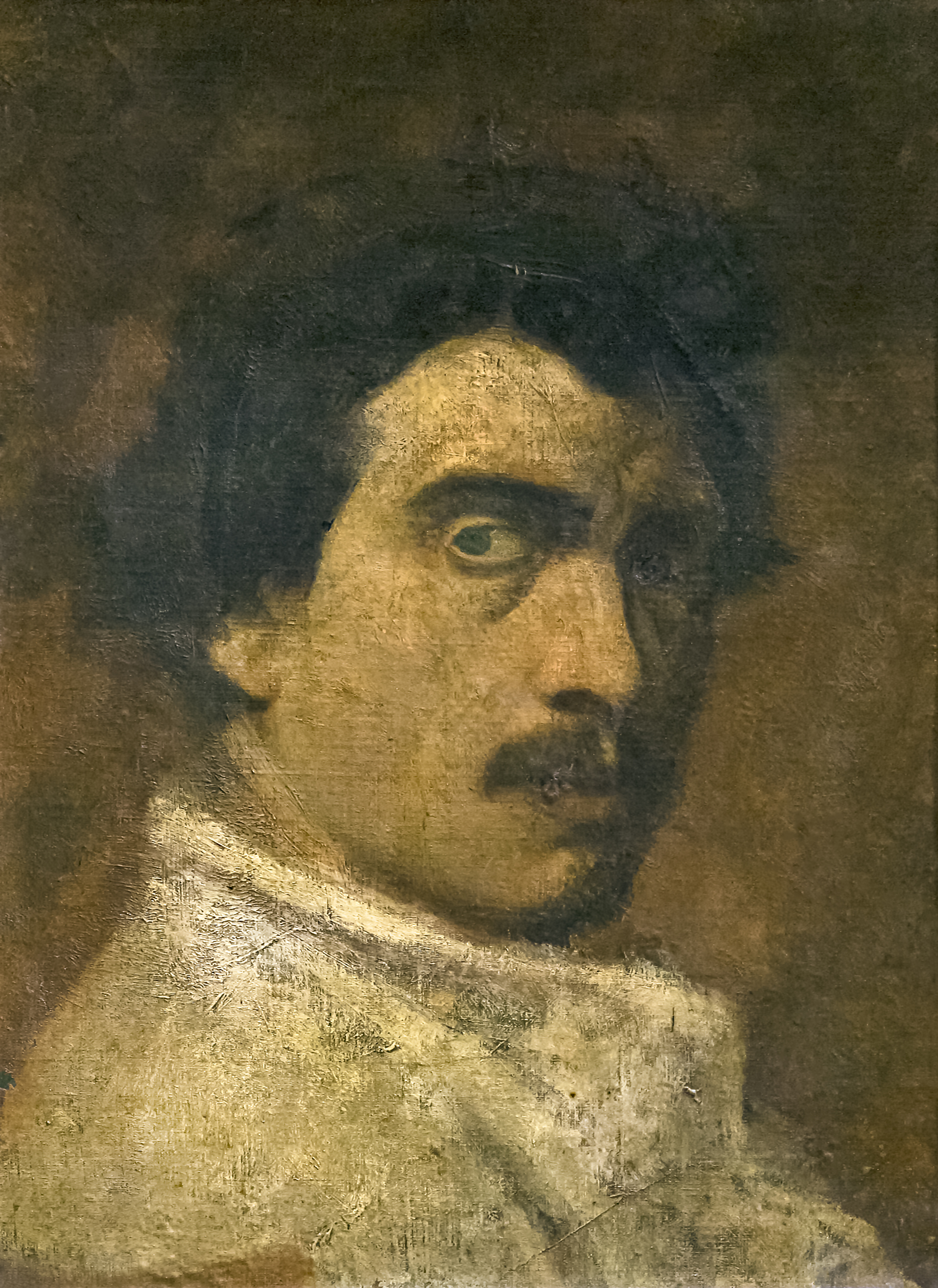
Self-portrait

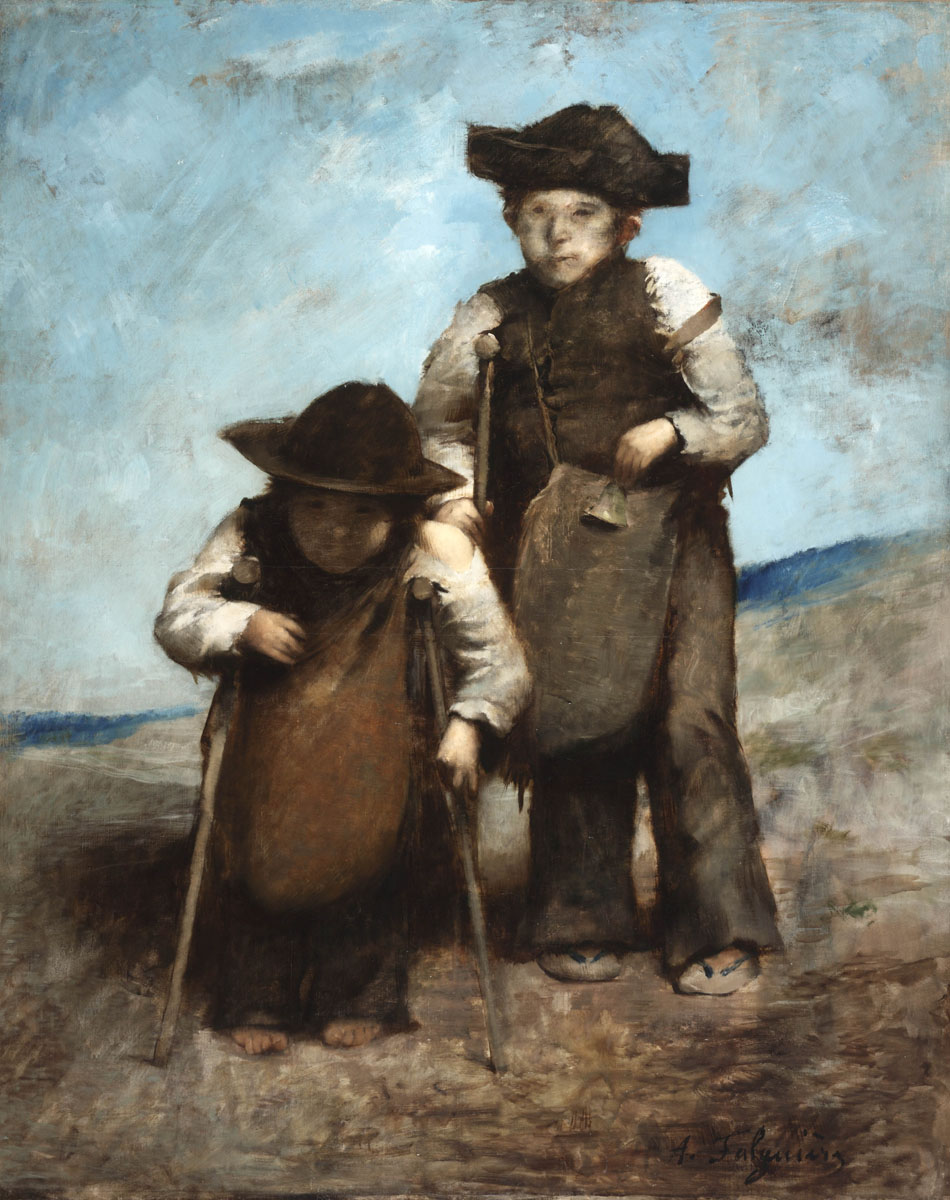
"Les Nains"

=== Images of villa "La Sapinière" ===
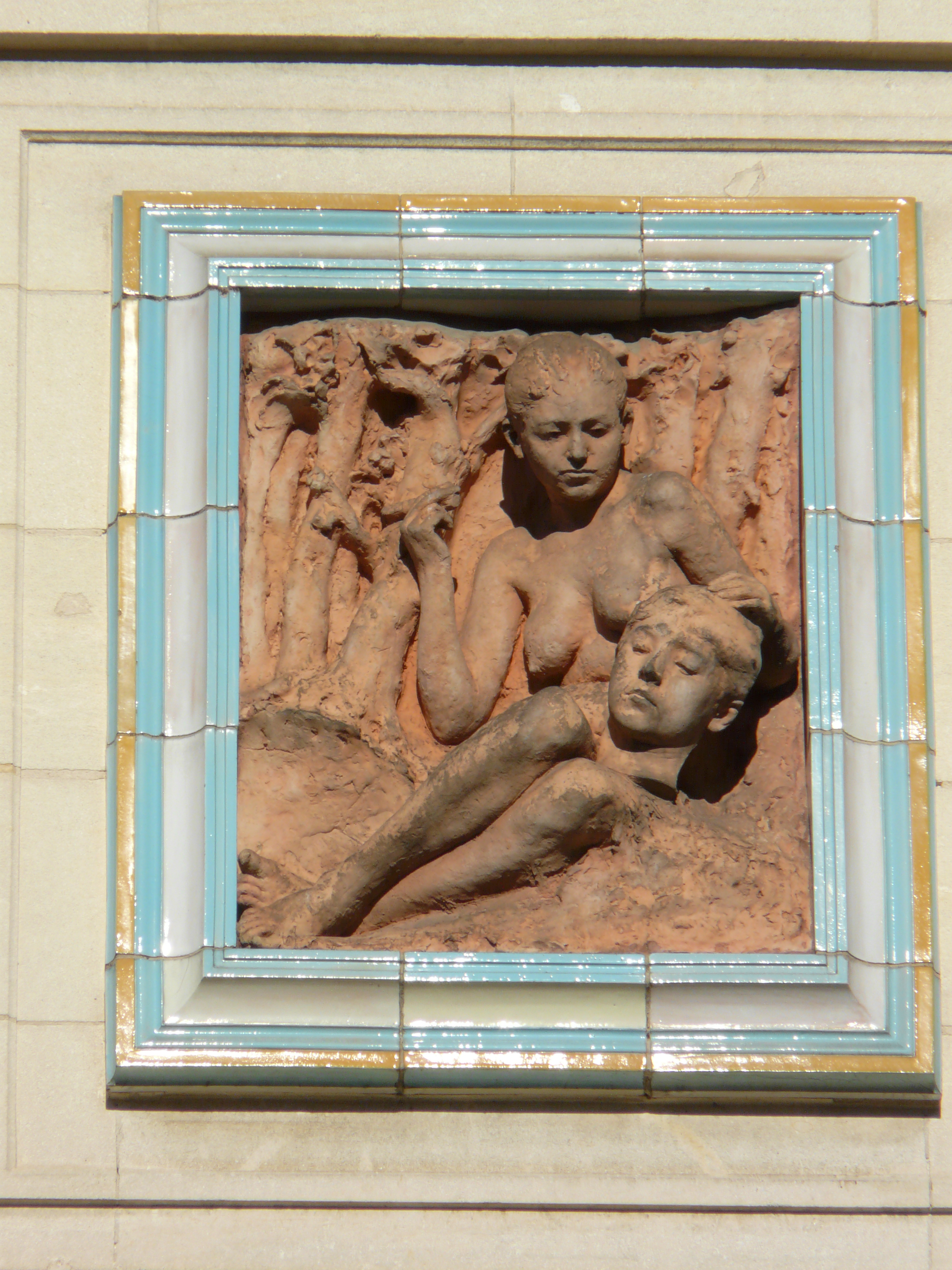
bas-relief

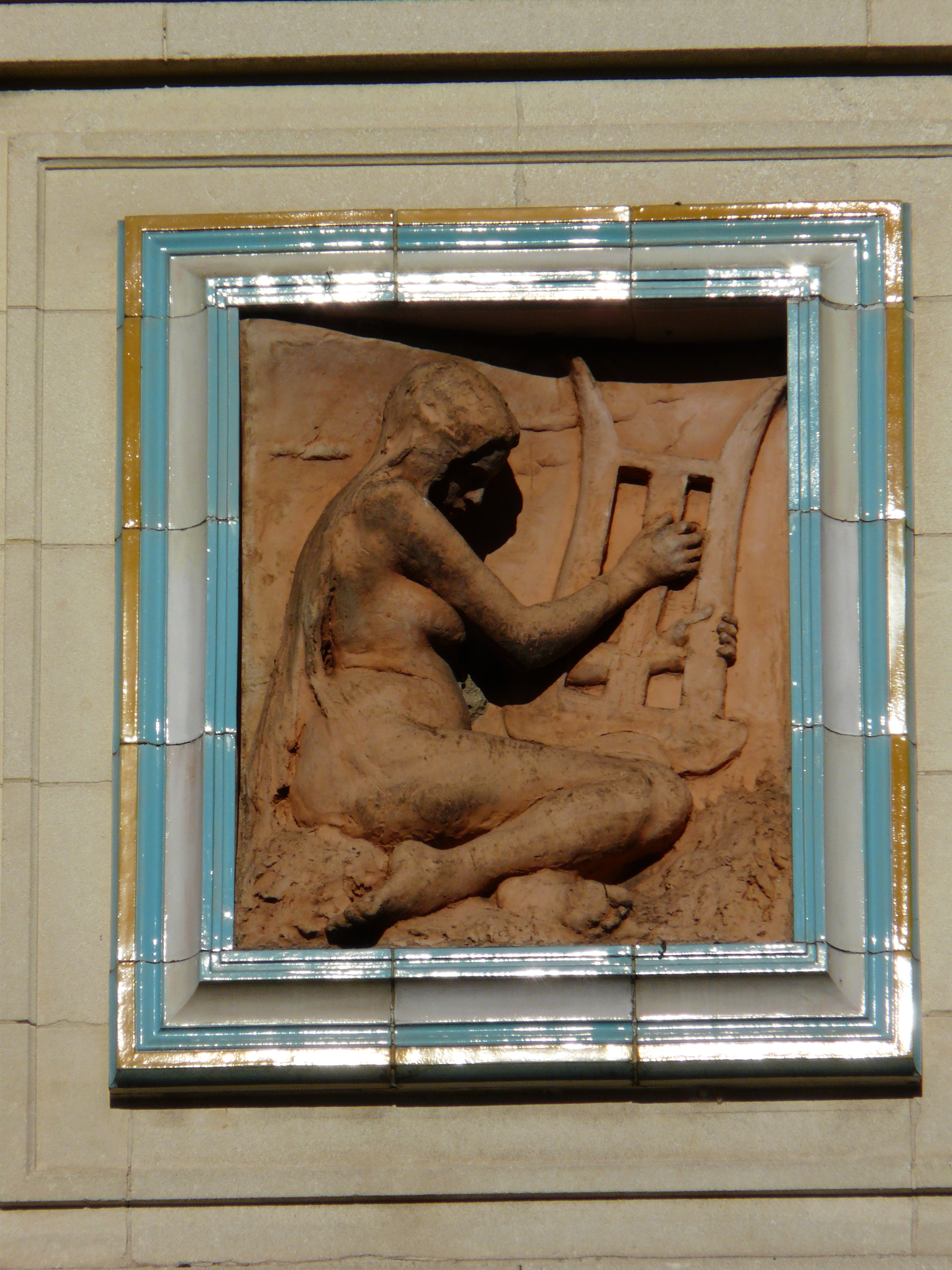
bas-relief

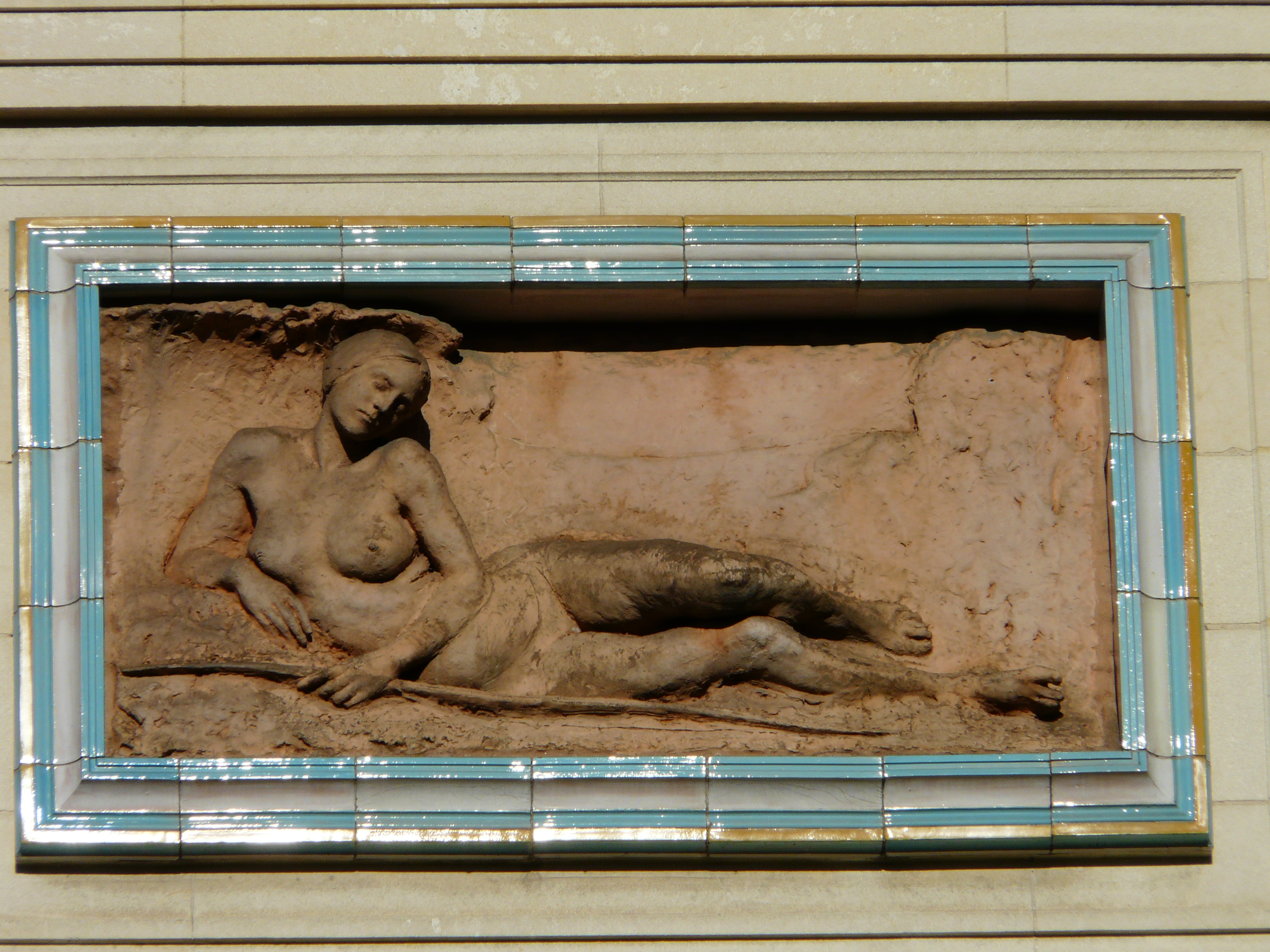
bas-relief

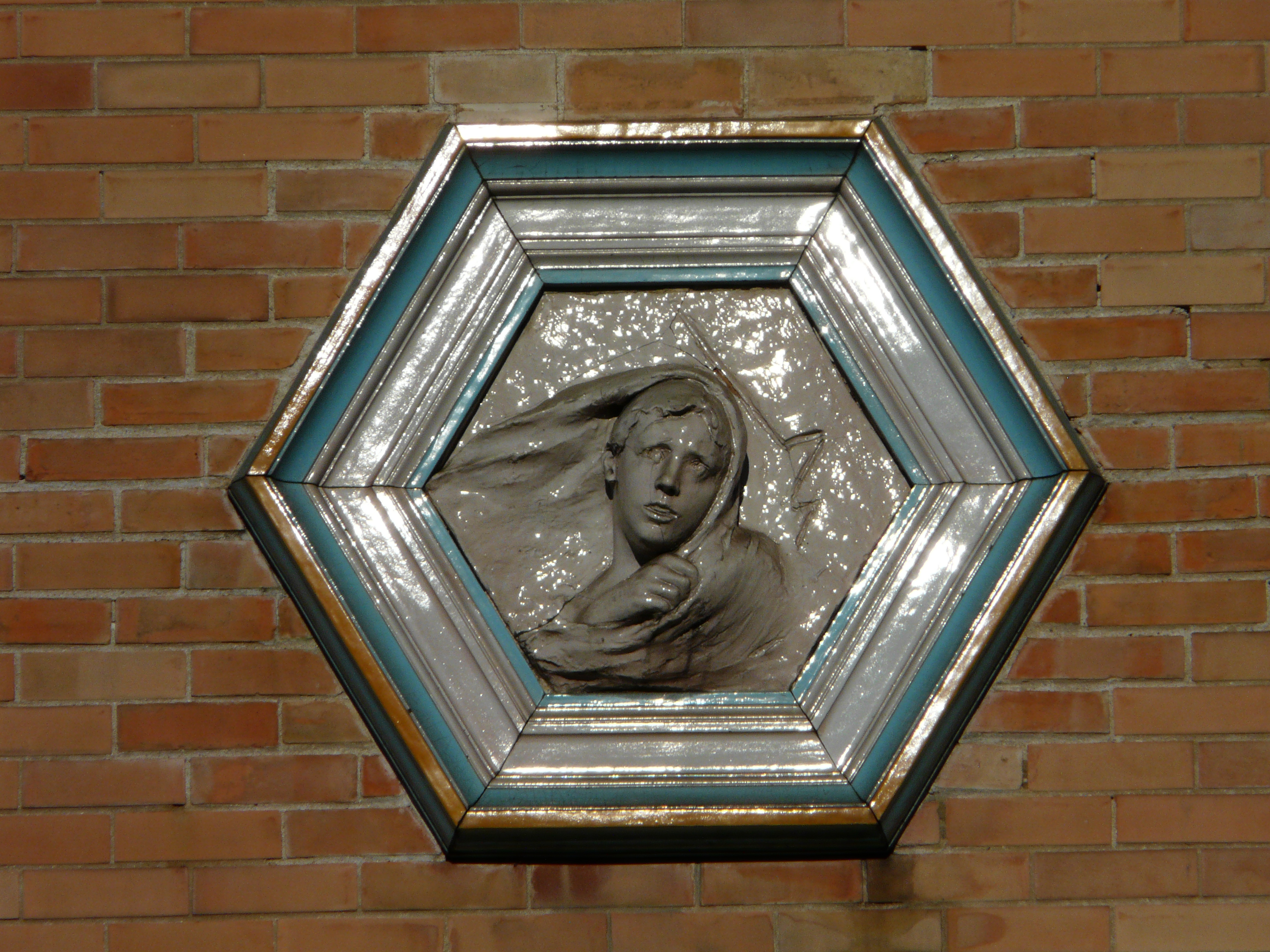
bas-relief

== Works in churches ==
Name	Location	Photograph	Date	Notes
Vierge à l'Enfant	Clairefontaine-en-Yvelines			In the parish church of Saint-Nicolas in Clairefontaine-en-Yvelines is a Falguière terracotta statue of the Virgin Mary with Baby Jesus. Originally the work was intended for Marseille's cathedral but was never installed there and was finally given to the parish church by Falguière's wife after his death. One of the inscriptions on the pedestal reads: "PROJET DE STATUE POUR LA CATHEDRALE DE MARSEILLE D'ALEXANDRE FALGUIERE STATUAIRE MEMBRE DE L'INSTITUT COMMANDEUR DE LA LEGION"
Tomb of Mgr Charles Emile Freppel	Angers Cathedral		1891	Falguière executed the sculpture for the tomb of Mgr Charles Emile Freppel in Angers Cathedral. The work is in white marble, was executed in 1891, and the inauguration took place on 13 November 1899.
Église de Saint-François-Xavier.	Paris			Falguière's work can be seen in the Église de Saint-François-Xavier in Paris. On the columns which decorate the arch of the sanctuary, Falguière has carved an angel with grapes and another with a sheaf of wheat, both symbols of the Eucharist.
Statue de Sainte Anne	Auray, Basilica's garden	Sainte Anne Auray - Ancienne Statue		The statue of St Anne in Auray in Morbihan is now located in the Basilica's garden. It depicts St Anne teaching the Virgin Mary to read and is carved from Kersanton granite. The statue weighs 12 ton and had originally been gilded and positioned at the top of the Basilica. Damaged in 1939, its weight required it to be moved and it was moved to its present location. Falguière worked on the original statue as well as the sculptor Le Goff and the architect Deperthes. In the Basilica itself the master altar has carvings by Falguière of the four Evangelists dating to 1874.
Statue of Sainte Germaine	Toulouse	Statue of Sainte Germaine	1887	Falguière's statue of Saint Germaine is in the église Sainte Germaine in Toulouse. Inauguration took place on 29 July 1877. The statue was originally located in the place Saint-Georges before being moved into the church.

== Public monuments outside France ==
Name	Location	Photograph	Date	Notes
Greece crowning Lord Byron	Athens	"Η Ελλάς τον Βύρωνα", λεωφόρος Βασιλίσσης Όλγας - panoramio		In Athens, Greece, outside the National Garden. Statue depicting Greece in the form of a woman crowning Byron. Sculpted by Henri Chapu and Falguière.
Statue of the Marquis de Lafayette	Washington, D.C., Lafayette Square	Statue of Marquis de Lafayette	1891±	Falguière and Antonin Mercié executed this statue, which was installed in 1891.
Statue of Antonio José de Sucre	Quito, Santo Domingo square	Statue of Mariscal Sucre	1890	Inaugurated in 1892.

== Miscellaneous ==
Name	Location	Photograph	Date	Notes
Monument à la Revolution-Liberte. Égalite. Fraternite	Paris			This was a work that Falguiere was never able to complete owing to his death but there is a model in plaster of the projected sculpture in the collection of the Musée d'Orsay which they acquired in 1950. Three figures are allegories for liberty, equality and fraternity. This would have formed part of a large work dedicated to the revolution which Falguiere was commissioned to complete by the French State.
La résistance	Paris			Mention has already been made of the work "La résistance" which Falguière sculpted in snow whilst serving in the National Guard during the Prussian siege of Paris in 1870. Falguière subsequently made a terracotta model for the Petit Palais in Paris. There is also a copy of the composition in green wax in the Musée Carnavalet in Paris. The terracotta figure is now held by the Musée des Augustins in Toulouse. A bronze casting by Thiebaut Freres is held in the Los Angeles County Museum. Falguière's model was also used to decorate the tomb of Doctor Lucio y Lopez in Buenos Aires' "Cimetiere de la Recoleta".
Médallion celebrating the life of Falguière				A médallion was struck to celebrate Falguière's work. It featured a relief of Falguière which had been created a few years earlier by Victor Peter. Peter had been the sculptor who added the finishing touches to the Louis Pasteur monument. The médallion is held in the collection of Rennes' musée des beaux-arts.
Medallion depicting E. Gebhart				Falguiere completed this médallion celebrating the life of E. Gebhart. It can be seen in the museum of Nemours castle.
