= Struma =

Struma may refer to:

- Struma (medicine), a swelling in the neck due to an enlarged thyroid gland
- Struma (skin disease), a mycobacterial skin disease
- Struma (river), a river in Bulgaria and Greece
- Struma motorway, a Bulgarian motorway
- Struma (village), a village in Bulgaria
- MV Struma, a ship chartered to carry Jewish refugees from Axis-allied Romania to British-controlled Palestine in World War II sunken in the Struma disaster, the largest civilian Black Sea naval disaster of World War II
- Struma Glacier, a glacier in Antarctica

== See also ==
- Struma Corps, of the Ottoman Empire
- Struma Offensive in the First World War
- Stroma (disambiguation)
