= Stromer =

Stromer is a surname of German origin. It may be derived either from the occupation of Strohmeyer, straw tax collector, or from 'Strōmer', "tramp". Notable persons with the name include:

- Del Stromer (1930–2003), American politician from Iowa
- Eric Stromer (born 1961), American actor and television host
- Ernst Stromer (1871–1952), German paleontologist
- Gerald Stromer (1942–2020), American politician from Nebraska
- Heinrich Stromer (died 1542), German physician
- Marvin Stromer (1933–1984), American politician from Nebraska and political science professor
- Ulman Stromer (1329–1407), German trader, factory owner and city councillor

== See also ==
- Stroma (disambiguation)
- Strohmeyer
- Strohmeier
