= Stroma =

Stroma may refer to:

== Biology ==
- Stroma (tissue), the connective, functionally supportive framework of a biological cell, tissue, or organ (in contrast, the parenchyma is the functional aspect of a tissue)
  - Stroma of ovary, a soft tissue, well supplied with blood, consisting of spindle-shaped cells with a small amount of connective tissue
  - Stroma of iris, fibres and cells in the iris
  - Stroma of cornea, plates of collagen fibrils in the cornea
  - Lymph node stromal cell, cells which provide a scaffold for other lymph node cells
  - Stroma of bone marrow
  - Stroma (fungus), a tissue structure of some ascomycete mushrooms
- Stroma (fluid), the fluid between grana, where carbohydrate-forming reactions occur in the chloroplasts of photosynthetic plant cells
- Stromal cell, a connective tissue cell of any organ; supports the function of the parenchyma
- The nonmalignant cells which are present in the tumor microenvironment; see Tumor microenvironment § Stromal cells

== People ==
- Freddie Stroma (born 1987), British actor known for playing Cormac McLaggen in Harry Potter and the Half-Blood Prince
- Stroma Buttrose (born 1929), Australian architect

== Other ==
- Stroma (musical group), a New Zealand chamber music ensemble
- Stroma, Scotland, a now uninhabited island off the northern coast of Scotland

== See also ==
- Stromae (born 1985), Belgian singer
- Struma (disambiguation)
- Stromatolite, layered sedimentary structure formed by the growth of bacteria or algae
- Stromer (disambiguation)
