= Stromal cell =

Connective tissue cell of any organ

Stromal cells, or mesenchymal stromal cells, are differentiating cells found in abundance within bone marrow but can also be seen all around the body. Stromal cells can become connective tissue cells of any organ, for example in the uterine mucosa (endometrium), prostate, bone marrow, lymph node and the ovary. They are cells that support the function of the parenchymal cells of that organ. The most common stromal cells include fibroblasts and pericytes. The term stromal comes from Latin stromat-, "bed covering", and Ancient Greek στρῶμα, strôma, "bed".

Stromal cells are an important part of the body's immune response and modulate inflammation through multiple pathways. They also aid in differentiation of hematopoietic cells and forming necessary blood elements. The interaction between stromal cells and tumor cells is known to play a major role in cancer growth and progression. In addition, by regulating local cytokine networks (e.g. M-CSF, LIF), bone marrow stromal cells have been described to be involved in human hematopoiesis and inflammatory processes.

Stromal cells (in the dermis layer) adjacent to the epidermis (the top layer of the skin) release growth factors that promote cell division. This keeps the epidermis regenerating from the bottom while the top layer of cells on the epidermis are constantly being "sloughed" off the body. Additionally, stromal cells play a role in inflammation responses, and controlling the amount of cells accumulating at an inflamed region of tissue.

== Defining a stromal cell ==
Defining a stromal cell is of importance because it was a source of difficulty in the past. Without a strong definition studies could not cross over or gain knowledge from each other because a stromal cell was not well defined and went by a plethora of names. A stromal cell is currently more specifically referred to as a mesenchymal stromal cell (MSC). It is non-hematopoietic, multipotent, and self-replicating. These factors make it an effective tool in potential cell therapies and tissue repair. Being a mesenchymal cell indicates an ability to develop into various other cell types and tissues such as connective tissue, blood vessels, and lymphatic tissue. Some stromal cells can be considered stem cells but not all therefore it can not be broadly termed a stem cell. All MSCs have the ability to adhere to plastic and replicate by themselves. The minimal criteria to define MSCs further include a specific set of cell surface markers. The cells must express CD73, CD90 and CD105 and they must be negative for CD14 or CD11b, CD34, CD45, CD79 alpha or CD19 and HLA-DR. Low levels of human leukocyte antigen (HLA-DR) make MSCs hypoimmunogenic. MSCs have trilineage differentiation capacity where they are able to adapt into osteoblast, chondrocytes, and adipocytes. They can also display anti-inflammatory as well as proinflammatory responses allowing for the potential to help with a broad range of immune disorders and inflammatory diseases.

== Sources of stromal cells ==
It is well known that stromal cells arise and are stored in the bone marrow until maturation and differentiation. They are located in the stroma and aid hematopoietic cells in forming the elements of the blood. While a majority is found in the bone marrow scientists now know that stromal cells can be found in a variety of different tissues as well. These can include adipose tissue, endometrium, synovial fluid, dental tissue, amniotic membrane and fluid, as well as the placenta. High quality stromal cells are located in the placenta, due to their young age. MSCs lose function with age, and aged MSCs are less efficacious in therapy.

== Role in cancer ==
During normal wound healing processes, the local stromal cells change into reactive stroma after altering their phenotype. However, under certain conditions, tumor cells can convert these reactive stromal cells further and transition them into tumor-associated stromal cells (TASCs). In comparison to non-reactive stromal cells, TASCs secrete increased levels of proteins and matrix metalloproteinases (MMPs). These proteins include fibroblast activating protein and alpha-smooth muscle actin. Furthermore, TASCs secrete many pro-tumorigenic factors such as vascular endothelial growth factor (VEGF), stromal-derived factor-1 alpha, IL-6, IL-8, tenascin-C, and others. These factors are known to recruit additional tumor and pro-tumorigenic cells. The cross-talk between the host stroma and tumor cells is essential for tumor growth and progression. Tumor stromal production exhibits similar qualities as normal wound repair such as new blood vessel formation, immune cell and fibroblast infiltration, and considerable remodeling of the extracellular matrix.

Additionally, the recruitment of local normal host stromal cells, such as bone marrow mesenchymal stromal cells, endothelial cells, and adipocytes, help create a conspicuously heterogeneous composition. Furthermore, these cells secrete an abundance of factors that help regulate tumor development. Potential targets for tumor-associated stromal cell recruitment have been identified in the following host tissue: bone marrow, connective tissue, adipose tissue, and blood vessels. Moreover, evidence suggests that tumor-associated stroma are a prerequisite for metastasis and tumor cell invasion. These are known to arise from at least six different origins: immune cells, macrophages, adipocytes, fibroblasts, pericytes, and bone marrow mesenchymal stromal cells. Furthermore, the tumor stroma is primarily composed of the basement membrane, fibroblasts, extracellular matrix, immune cells, and blood vessels. Typically, most host cells in the stroma are characterized by tumor-suppressive abilities. However, during malignancy, the stroma will undergo alterations to consequently incite growth, invasion, and metastasis. These changes include the formation of carcinoma-associated fibroblasts (CAFs) which comprises a major portion of the reactive tissue stroma and plays a critical role in regulating tumor progression.

Certain types of skin cancers (basal cell carcinomas) cannot spread throughout the body because the cancer cells require nearby stromal cells to continue their division. The loss of these stromal growth factors when the cancer moves throughout the body prevents the cancer from invading other organs.

Stroma is made up of the non-malignant cells, but can provide an extracellular matrix on which tumor cells can grow. Stromal cells may also limit T-cell proliferation via nitric oxide production, hindering immune capability.

== Immunomodulatory effects ==
=== Anti-inflammatory ===
An important property of MSCs is their ability to suppress an excessive immune response. T-cells, B-cells, dendritic cells, macrophages, and natural killer cells can be overstimulated during an ongoing immune response, but stromal cells help to keep the balance and make sure the body can properly heal without an excessive amount of inflammation. Thereby, they also help prevent autoimmunity.

MSCs can affect cells of the adaptive immune system as well as cells of the innate immune system. For example, they can inhibit the proliferation and activity of T-cells When there is a high level of MSCs during an immune response the generation of more B-cells is stunted. The B-cells that can still be produced are impacted by diminished antibody count production and chemotactic behavior. Dendritic cells in the presence of MSC's are immature and undifferentiated which causes impaired function to call upon T-cells and bridge the gap between the innate and adaptive immune responses. These dendritic cells instead release cytokines in order to regulate the growth and activity of other immune system cells as well as blood cells. Furthermore, MSCs can polarize macrophages towards a more immunosuppressive M2 phenotype. The mechanisms through which MSCs affect cells of the immune system can be contact-dependent or mediated by secreted substances. An example for a contact-dependent mechanism is the expression of programmed death-ligand 1 (PD-L1), through which MSCs can suppress T cells. The secreted substances MSCs release an inflammatory response is stimulated include for example nitric oxide (NO), indoleamine 2,3-dioxygenase (IDO), prostaglandin E2 (PGE2), programmed death-ligand 1 (PD-L1) and many more. Inflammatory cytokines like IFN-gamma can stimulate the expression of these immunoregulatory mediators like IDO. IDO catalyzes the conversion of tryptophan into kynurenine inhibiting T cell proliferation and activity by tryptophan depletion and by kynurenine-mediated suppression.

=== Pro-inflammatory ===
Stromal cells are most often looked at for their hypoimmunogenic response but they are actually non specific immunomodulating. MSCs can flip the switch between anti-inflammatory and pro-inflammatory based on their levels of IFN-gamma, TNF, and either +IL-6 or -IL-6. Pathogens are initially recognized by toll-like receptors (TLR's). This triggers inflammatory mediators and activates either pro- or anti-inflammatory MSCs. If IFN-gamma and TNF are present in high levels the MSCs will stimulate an anti-inflammatory response by activating CD4, CD25, FoxP3, and Treg cell instead of cytotoxic T-cells. However, if the levels of IFN-gamma and TNF are low the MSCs produce low levels of IDO and therefore can activate T-cells normally and the inflammation process takes place. MSCs with +IL-6 in the presence of monocytes induce M2-macrophages and CCL-18 which inhibits T-cells from being activated. However, MSCs with -IL-6 in the presence of monocytes induce M1-macrophages and can activate T-cells and produce high levels of IFN-gamma and TNF which regulates the inflammation through the previously mentioned mechanism.

== Role in hematopoiesis ==
Before differentiation a majority of MSCs are housed within the bone marrow which is also where lymphocytes and other blood elements are formed. Stromal cells play a large role in the distinction of hematopoietic cells (cells that can differentiate into other blood cells). MSCs act as a physical support for differentiating hematopoietic cells in conjunction with the extracellular matrix. Stromal cells also provide nutrients and growth factors for the hematopoietic cell to continue to develop. Lastly, MSCs express adhesion molecules that influence the hematopoietic cells differentiation. The body tells the MSCs what blood elements are needed and it conveys those adhesion molecules to the differentiating cell.

- Stroma (disambiguation)
- Stroma of ovary
- Multipotent stromal cells

== Use in future therapies ==
MSCs have the potential to be used in multiple disease interventions. One important feature of MSCs is that they can go virtually undetected by the immune system. The stromal cells possess serine proteases which are an inhibitor of the immune response. They also do not carry receptors that relate to the immune system or are not in high enough concentrations to admit a response. This is helpful for the future of MSC cell therapies because there will be little to no negative effects from a possible immune response. There is promising research in the fields of autoimmune disorders such as multiple sclerosis and rheumatoid arthritis as well as wound healing, COPD, and even acute respiratory distress syndrome (an effect of COVID-19). Stromal cells have the unique ability to create an immune modulated environment in order to best respond to foreign and known particles. The reason for halted use of MSCs is the lack of knowledge of the cells in vivo. Most research of these cells have been done in controlled laboratory environments which can sometimes alter the effects seen. The potentials, however, for cell therapy in tissue repair, immune modulation, and anti-tumor agent distribution are promising.

== See also ==
- List of human cell types derived from the germ layers
