= Strohmeier =

Strohmeyer is a surname of German origin derived from the occupation of Strohmeyer, straw tax collector. Notable people with the surname include:

- Karim Strohmeier
- Rudolf Strohmeier (born 1952), German official of the European Union
- Scott Strohmeier
- Tara Strohmeier

== See also ==
- Strohmeyer
- Stromer
