= Helene Marie Stromeyer =

German painter (1834–1924)

- Born: 26 August 1834; Hannover, Germany
- Died: 13 March 1924 (aged 89); Karlsruhe, Germany
- Known for: Painting

Helene Marie Stromeyer (26 August 1834 – 13 March 1924) was a German painter known for her floral and landscape paintings.

== Biography ==
Stromeyer was born on 26 August 1834 in Hanover. The surgeon Louis Stromeyer was her father. In the 1880s she attended the Großherzoglich Badische Kunstschule (Academy of Fine Arts, Karlsruhe) where she was taught by Hans Gude and Gustav Schönleber.

Stromeyer exhibited her work at the Woman's Building at the 1893 World's Columbian Exposition in Chicago, Illinois.

She was a member of the Düsseldorf School of Painting and the Karlsruhe Artists' Association. By the end of her life, Stromeyer was considered one of the most important still life painters of her time.

Stromeyer died on 13 March 1924 in Karlsruhe.

== Gallery ==
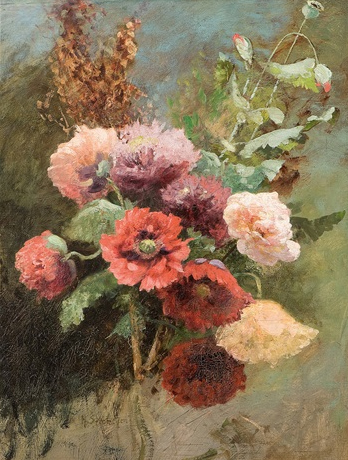
Stillleben mit Mohn

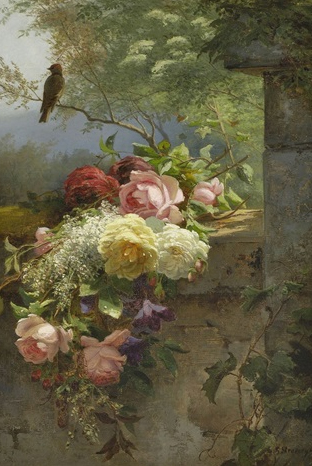
Blumenbouquet auf Gartenmauer

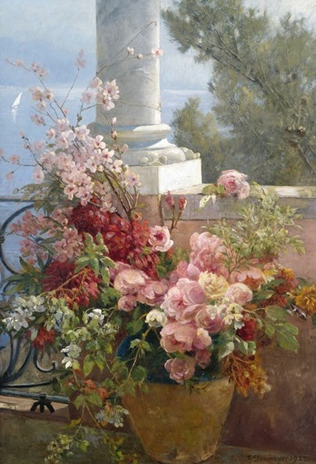
Blumenstilleben auf einer Seeterrasse 1923
