= David Stromeyer =

American abstract sculptor (born 1946)

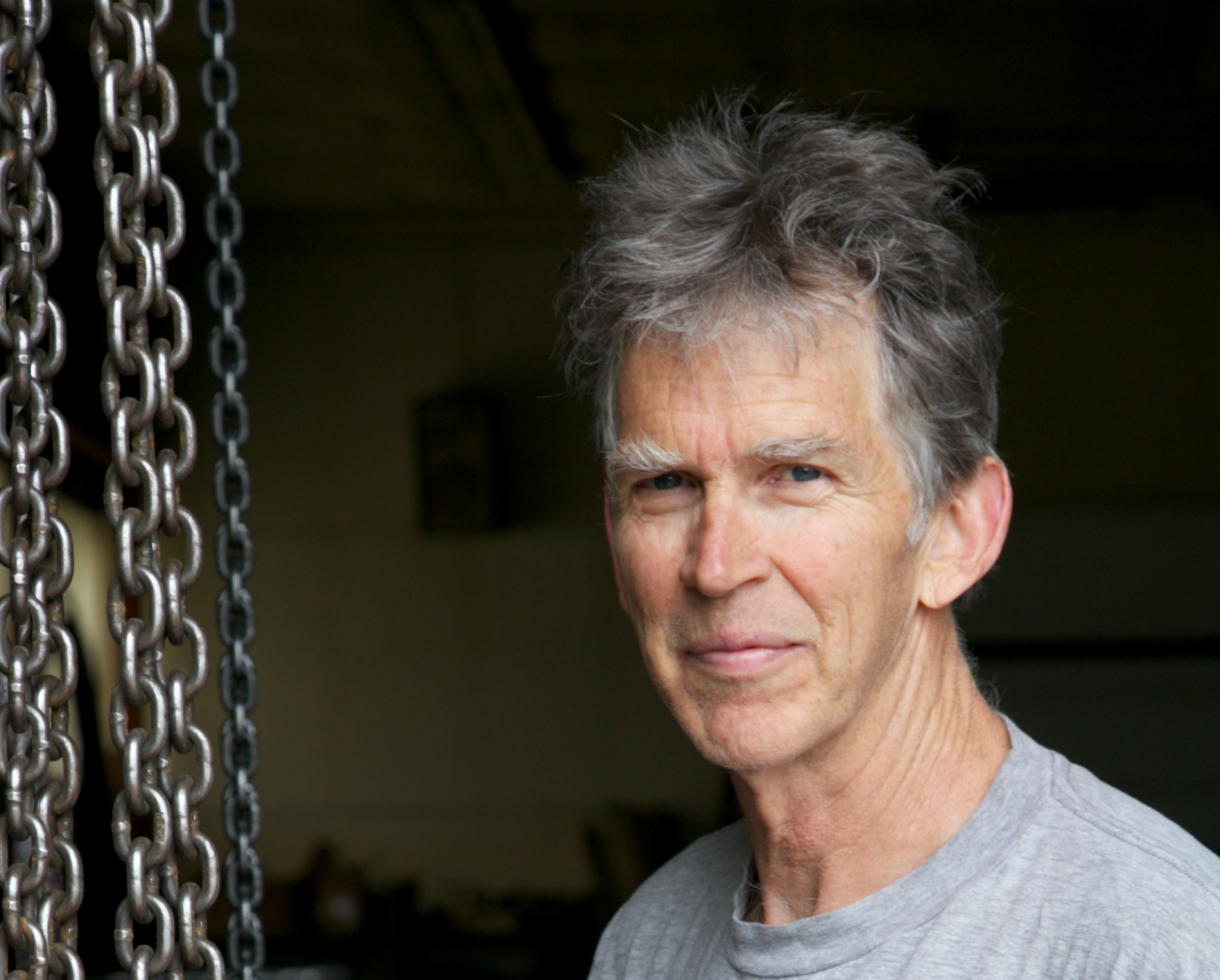
- Born: 1946 (age 79–80); Marblehead, Massachusetts
- Education: Dartmouth College; University of California, Los Angeles
- Known for: Sculpture
- Movement: Abstract Expressionism

David Stromeyer (born 1946) is an American abstract sculptor who is best known for his large-scale, outdoor, painted steel sculptures. He currently resides in Enosburg Falls, Vermont, and Austin, Texas, with his wife, Sarah. His work can be found in Smithsonian American Art Museum, DeCordova Sculpture and Art Museum, Overland Park, Strathmore Hall Sculpture Garden in Bethesda, Cornell University, Plattsburgh State University, and corporate and private collections across the country.

== Life ==
David Stromeyer was born in Marblehead, Massachusetts. In his youth, he suffered from osteomyelitis that necessitated multiple surgeries and body casts, immobilizing him. Upon regaining mobility, he explored structure in model scale using erector sets, wood, and other materials.

Stromeyer attended Dartmouth College where he skied competitively and continued his study of mathematics. He graduated with a degree in Studio Art (high honors), and went on to study film at UCLA. Stromeyer then moved to Boston where he formed a small film production company. He also freelanced as an Art Photographer for museums in Boston and New York City.

Stromeyer embarked on a cycling trip, riding solo across Canada. Hitchhiking back to the East coast, he sought out a site to create and display his future work.

== Work ==
In the 1970s, Stromeyer's created sculptures of unfinished steel, influenced by Russian Constructivists and artists such as David Smith and Mark di Suvero." but gradually began to include more fluidity in his work.

== Cold Hollow Iron Works ==
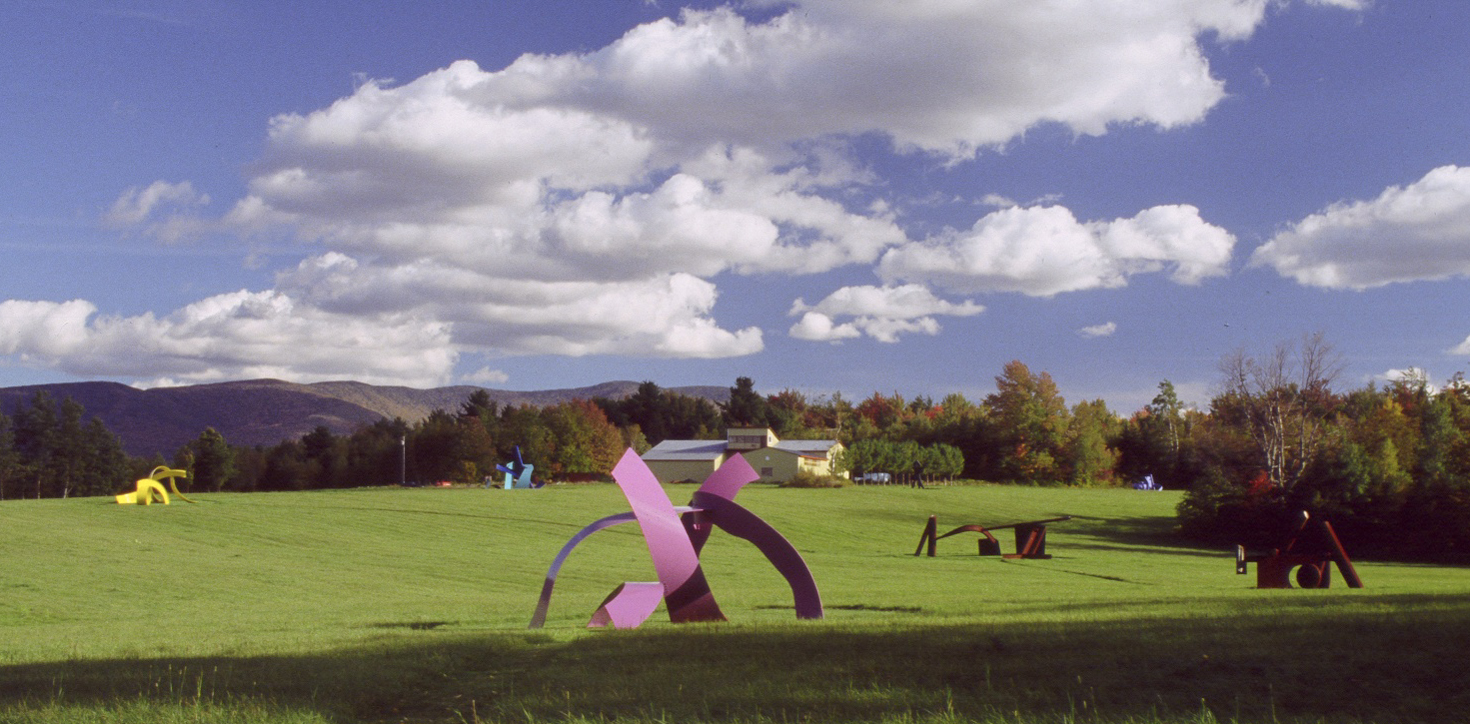
Cold Hollow Iron Works

In 1970, Stromeyer purchased a 200-acre former dairy farm in Northern Vermont's Cold Hollow Mountains, ten miles from the Canada–US border. After briefly working in the existing horse barn, he constructed a large studio with multiple overhead cranes, and designed a large hydraulic press for cold-forming heavy steel plates. He then began to work on larger, more architectural sculptures. He called his studio and the surrounding meadows "Cold Hollow Iron Works", a name which reflects the influence of sculptor David Smith, whose workshop was called "Terminal Iron Works".

In 2014, Stromeyer continues to create large scale sculptures at Cold Hollow Iron Works. Some fifty or so finished works are sited in the five meadows. Other sculptures are assembled at remote locations, for example a recent installation at the Emerson Umbrella Center for the Arts in Concord .

== Gallery ==
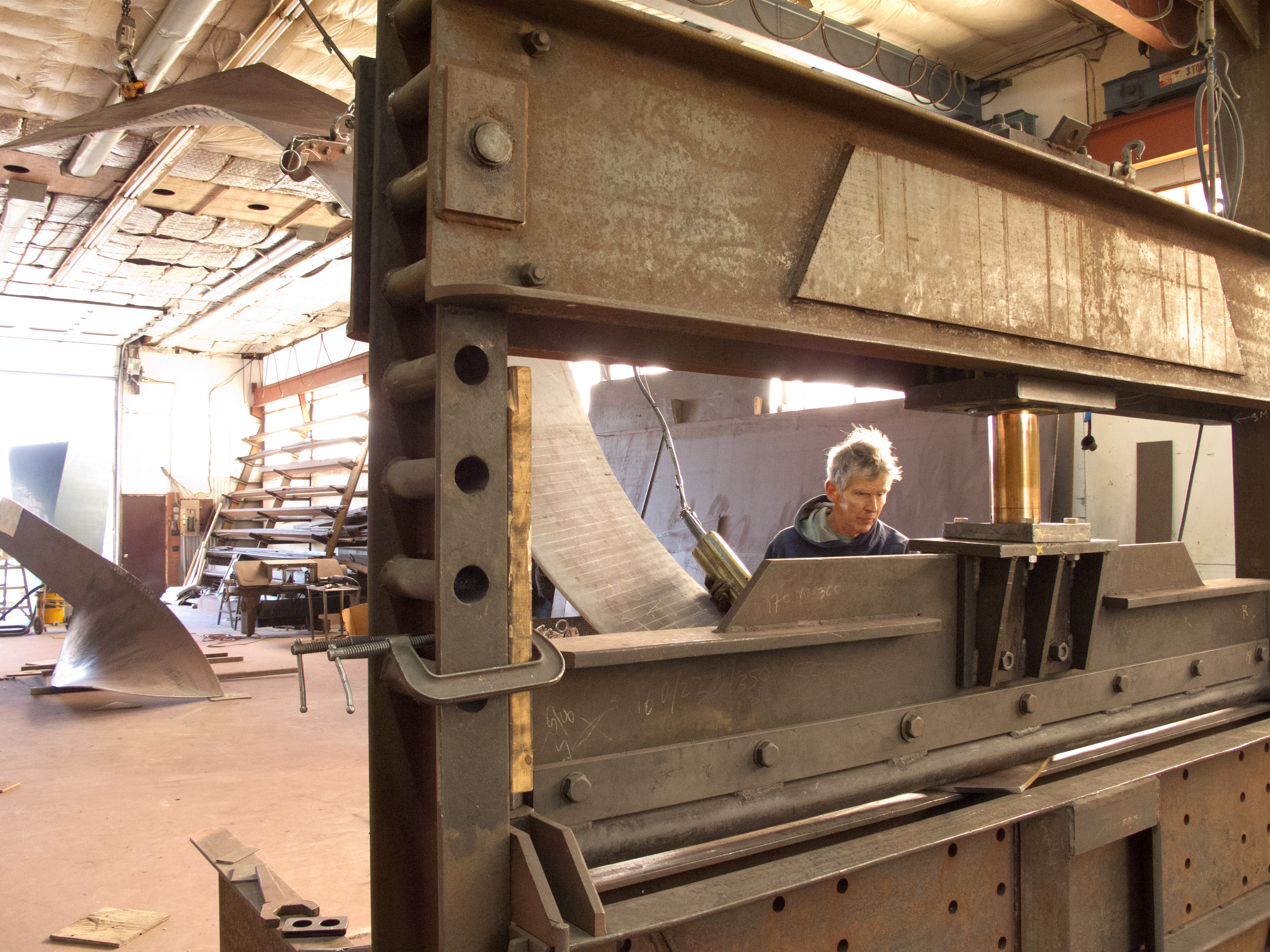
David Stromeyer at hydraulic press forming a section

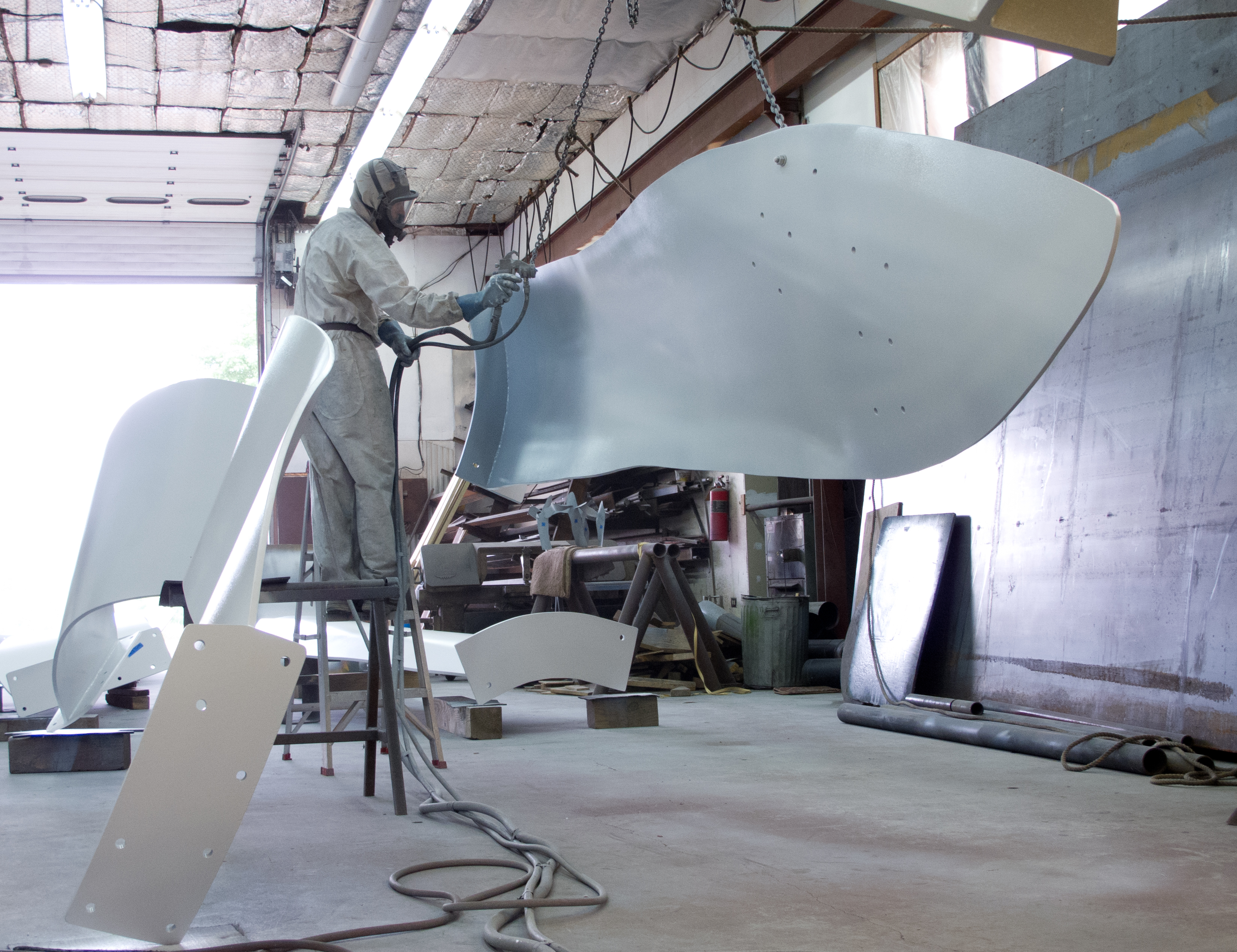
David Stromeyer applying primer

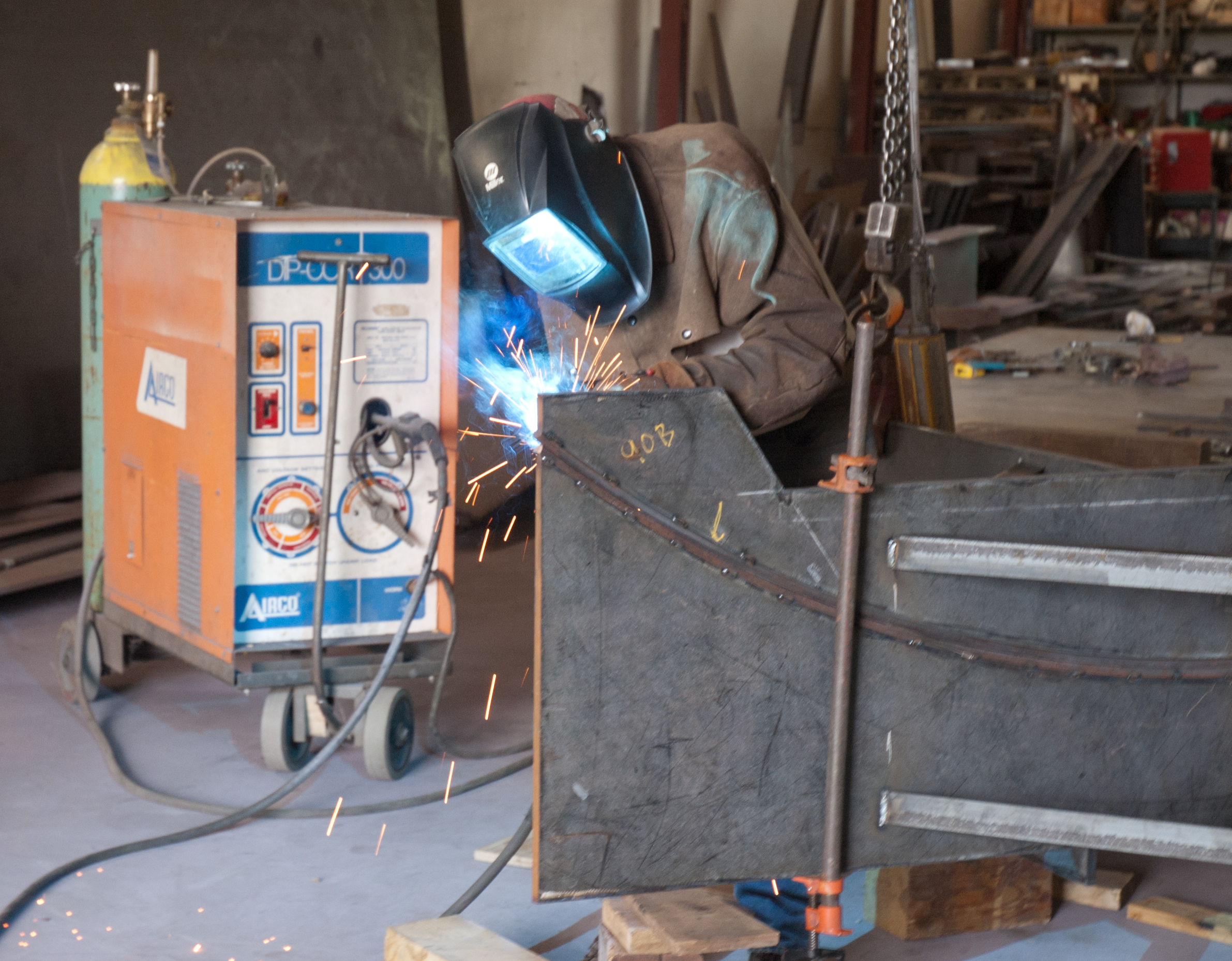
David Stromeyer Welding Up Bending Jig To Create Twists

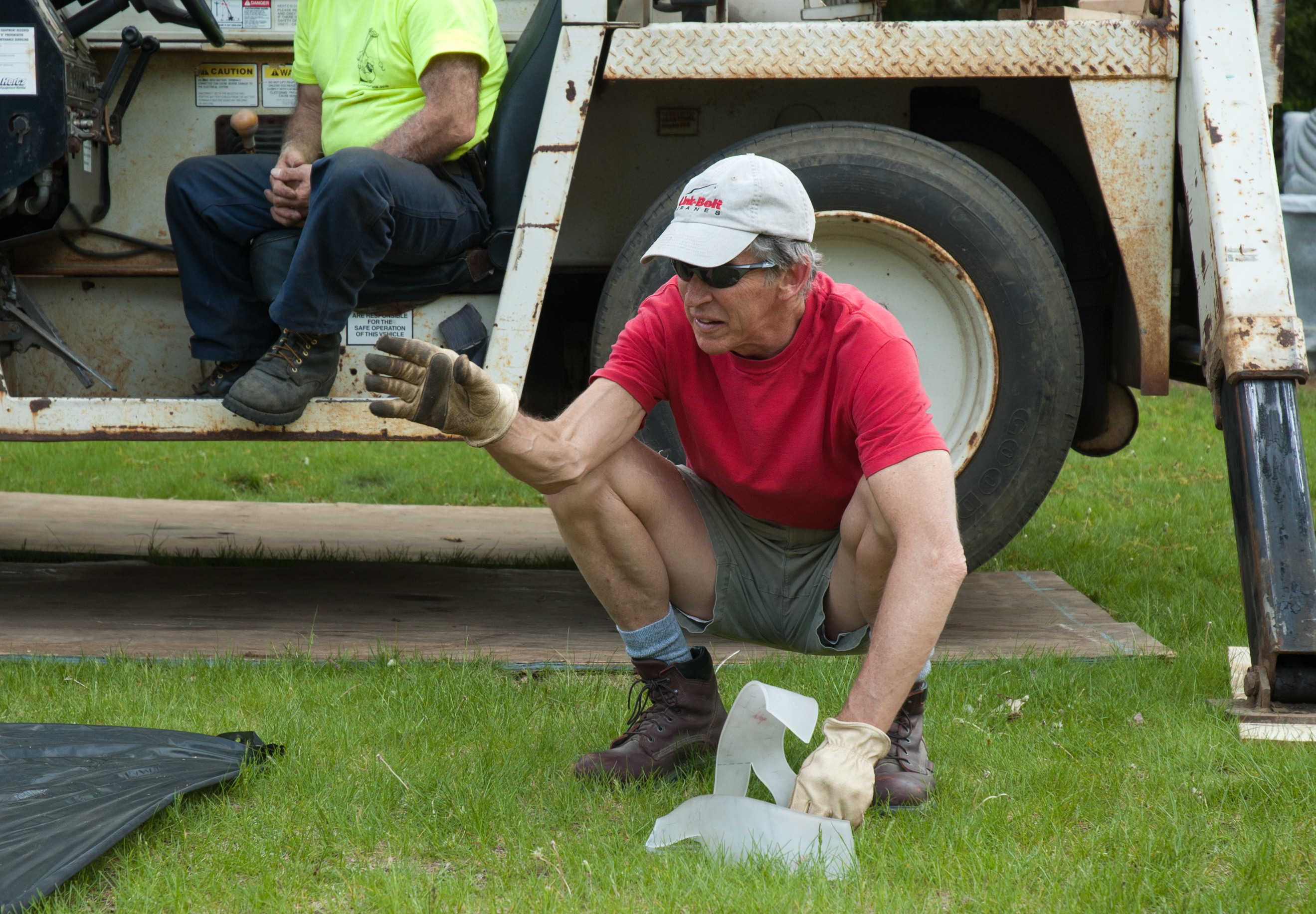
David Stromeyer determining orientation from a scale model during an installation 2013
