= Tenotomy =

Surgical procedure in which a tendon is cut

- ICD-9-CM: 83.13
- OPS-301 code: 5-10b, 5-814, 5-840, 5-851

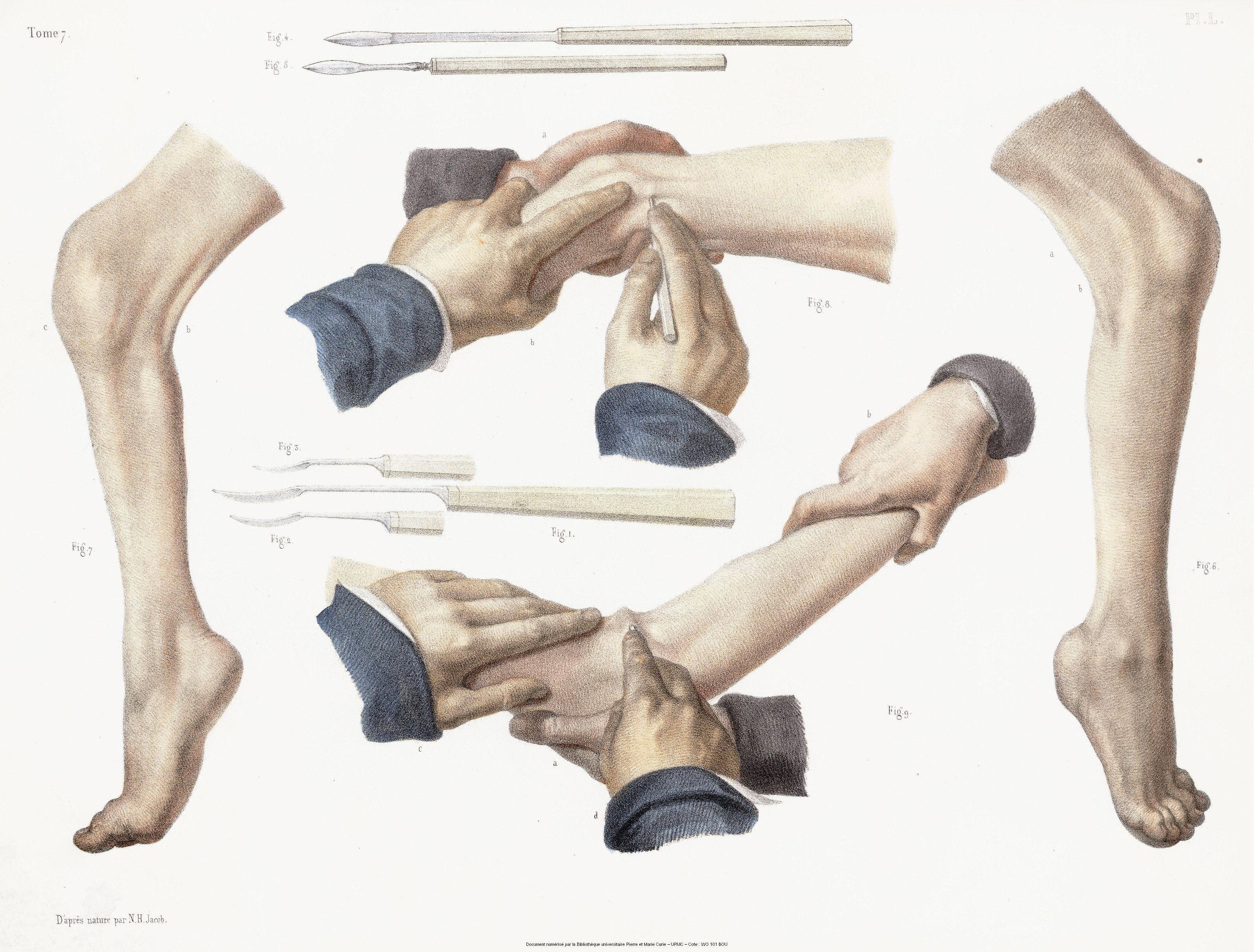
Tenotomy, 19th century.

A tenotomy is a surgical act which involves the division of a tendon. It and related procedures are also referred to as tendon release, tendon lengthening, and heel-cord release.

When it involves the Achilles tendon, it is called "Achillotenotomy".

It has been used in the treatment of cerebral palsy.

It has also been used for hammer toe.

As an alternative to SLAP lesion labral repair, the tendon of the long head of the bicep can be released.

Achilles tenotomy is commonly used as part of the Ponseti Method of treating clubfoot.

== See also ==
- List of surgeries by type
