= Hubert of Vendôme =

Hubert of Vendôme (c. 980/985 – 1047) was the bishop of Angers between 1006 and 1047. He was the son of Hubert, viscount of Vendôme, and Emma.

He was consecrated on 13 June 1006, most likely in the church of the monastery of St.Aubin, after being chosen by count Fulk Nerra, an appointment which brought him political dividends and also some immediate dividends, like the church of Mazé.

Soon after his accession, Hubert had to deal with the claims of Fulbert, new bishop of Chartres and an ally of the House of Blois, over the county of Vendôme. Hubert, a loyal ally of the House of Anjou, resisted (together with other magnates), and helped Fulk to keep Vendôme firmly in the political orbit of Anjou. Moreover, Hubert was responsible for bringing a significant number of people from the Vendômois into Anjou, both into clerical and civil roles.

He also inherited a difficult situation in Mauges, a strategic region in the southwest of the county. The previous bishop, Renaud II, donated many of his possessions in the area to the bishopric and the monastery of St.Serge. Fulk Nerra, on the other hand, considered these donations invalid, since he claimed that Viscount Renaud of Angers had promised them to Geoffrey Greymantle, as a condition for the nomination of Renaud II to the bishopric. Hubert recognized Fulk's claims, and worked to incorporate Mauges into his own Diocese, exercising episcopal rights over the monastery of Saint-Florent. Hubert complemented this policy with the installation of the family of his niece Emma in the region, and also with the repurchase of lands that he later donated to St.Serge and the cathedral of St. Maurice of Angers.

In 1016, during the conflict between Anjou and Blois which ended at the Battle of Pontlevoy, Hubert participated directly, laying waste to part of the Touraine. For this reason, he was excommunicated and put under an interdict by Hugh, archbishop of Tours. By September 1022 he was in good relations with Odo II, Count of Blois, so it is safe to assume that by then the sanctions had been lifted.

Hubert's close cooperation with Fulk Nerra continued during the reign of his son Geoffrey Martel, as can be deduced by the continuous presence of Hubert as witness in Geoffrey's acts and his participation in important ceremonies. Also consistent with Angevin policy, Hubert was loyal to the Kings of France.

Hubert rebuilt the cathedral of Angers, burned in 1000 before his accession, and he dedicated it on 16 August 1025. He frequently attended the meetings of the cathedral chapter, and took care of the canons endowing the chapter with significant contributions.

He started a cathedral school at Angers and, probably in 1012, he called Bernard, a former pupil of Fulbert of Chartres and the writer of the Liber miraculorum sancte Fidis to direct it. By 1025 he had named Bernerius as magister, and by 1039 he had appointed Renaud, who also became archdeacon and chancellor. Most notably, before 1039 he brought Berengar of Tours, formerly the master of the cathedral school at Tours to Angers, making him the cathedral treasurer. Berengar was a relevant intellectual figure in France, and during his tenure at Angers he participated in an important eucharistic controversy about the exact nature of the transubstantiation.

He died on 2 March 1047 and was buried the next day at the monastery of St.Serge.

== Family ==
He had a sister, Hadeburga, who married Stephen. Hadeburga's daughter, Emma, married Radulfus IV, viscount of Le Mans and was the mother of Hubert de Beaumont-au-Maine.

He was also a cousin of Vulgrinus, later abbot of St.Serge and then bishop of Le Mans.

== Sources ==
- Fanning, Steven (1988). "A bishop and his world before the Gregorian reform: Hubert of Angers, 1006-1047". Transactions of the American Philosophical Society. 78 (1): 1–193. doi:10.2307/1006555. JSTOR 1006555.
- Guillot, Olivier (1972). Le Comté d'Anjou et son Entourage au XIe siècle. Paris, Picard.
