= Berengarians =

Christian faction in eucharistic debates

The Berengarians were a proto-Protestant religious sect that adhered to the views of Berengar of Tours, Archdeacon of Angers, and opposed several key Roman Catholic doctrines in the mid-11th century. They opposed the emerging doctrine of Transubstantiation, the practice of infant baptism, and private sacramental confession. Additionally, they upheld the belief that Scripture, rather than the Church, held supreme authority for Christians. The Berengarian sect, considered heretical by the Roman Catholic Church, is said to have numbered 800,000, according to the historian Bellarmine.

== Classification as heresy ==
The Roman Catholic Church held considerable power in Western Europe during the High and Late Middle Ages. Those clergy and theologians whom it judged guilty of heresy could be excommunicated and exiled or sentenced to death unless they formally recanted their errors. A text by Frankish monk Ratramnus of Corbie misattributed to John Scotus Eriugena, a philosopher-theologian and intellectual heir of Maximus the Confessor in the 9th-Century, had maintained that there was no physical transformation of the Eucharist. Later in 1047, Berengar of Tours reignited the debate in the name of Eriugena. During the next 30 years, Berengar was asked to recant his heresy concerning what would be declared the Roman Catholic dogma of transubstantiation no less than five times including a short spell in prison. He later retired into solitude and made no further pronouncements on the matter.

== Followers of the sect ==
It is known that an early supporter of Berengar was Bishop Eusebius of Angers. It is also well documented that Geoffrey II, Count of Anjou, was a follower of Berengarian beliefs and played a key role in securing Berengar's release from imprisonment.The historian Belamine said that the supporters numbered 800,000 by 1160.

His followers were divided on the head of the Eucharist; though they all agreed that the bread and wine were not essentially changed, some allowed it to be changed in effect though under an impanation, which was the opinion of Berenger himself. Others denied any change at all, and resolved all into figure. Yet others allowed a change in part, and others an entire change, with the restriction that to those who presented themselves unworthily, it was changed back again.

The Italian reformer Gundolfo was said to be an early Berengarian.

== Influence on Reformers ==
As Berengar left no written tracts, it is not completely certain how much influence the Berengarians had on the Protestant Reformation. While John Calvin rejected the theory of transubstantiation in favour of "pneumatic presence," Martin Luther had criticised the making of that teaching into a dogma, as well as some of its metaphysical underpinnings and implications.
