= Gundolfo =

Gundolfo or Gundulf is purported to be a teacher of proto-Protestant Christian doctrines in the 11th century. Of Italian origin, he was said to be active in the bishopric of Cambrai-Arras in northern France (south of Lille) around 1046 during the episcopate of Bishop Gerard of Florennes.

Gundolfo was heavily influenced by the preaching and teaching of Berengar of Tours and his teaching about the supremacy of scripture. Gundolfo could himself be considered an early Berengarian.

Gundulfo rejected the sacraments and authority of the Catholic Church and claimed salvation by a righteousness based on reading of the scriptures rather than on Catholic Church dogma. His teachings emphasized that salvation was achieved through a virtuous life of abandoning the world, restraining the appetites of the flesh, earning food by the labor of hands, doing no injury to anyone, and extending charity to everyone of their own faith.

Following a lengthy sermon by Gerard, followers of Gundulfo recanted their radical beliefs and were received back into the Church. The source of Gundolfo's teachings is unknown but may be compared to Catharism and to the Waldensians.

Details surrounding the remainder of Gundolfo's life are scarce, including when and where he died.

The later preacher and reformer known as Peter of Bruys was said to be influenced by him.

== Historicity ==
Because Gundolfo and his followers are only known from a single, uncorroborated text from around 1200 in Cîteaux, a prominent monastic house battling heresy, there are doubts as to the historical veracity of Gundolfo's existence.

It is possible that the narrative of Gundulfo's followers being questioned and corrected by Bishop Gerard was a rhetorical framing device for the treatise against heresy that he was already intending to publish. However, the fact that it does not contain reference to other radical positions being preached in the region lends some credibility to the figure and the story having some basis in historical reality.
