= Domaine de la Léonardsau =

French Castle situated in Bœrsch

Coordinates: 48.4696°N 7.4431°E

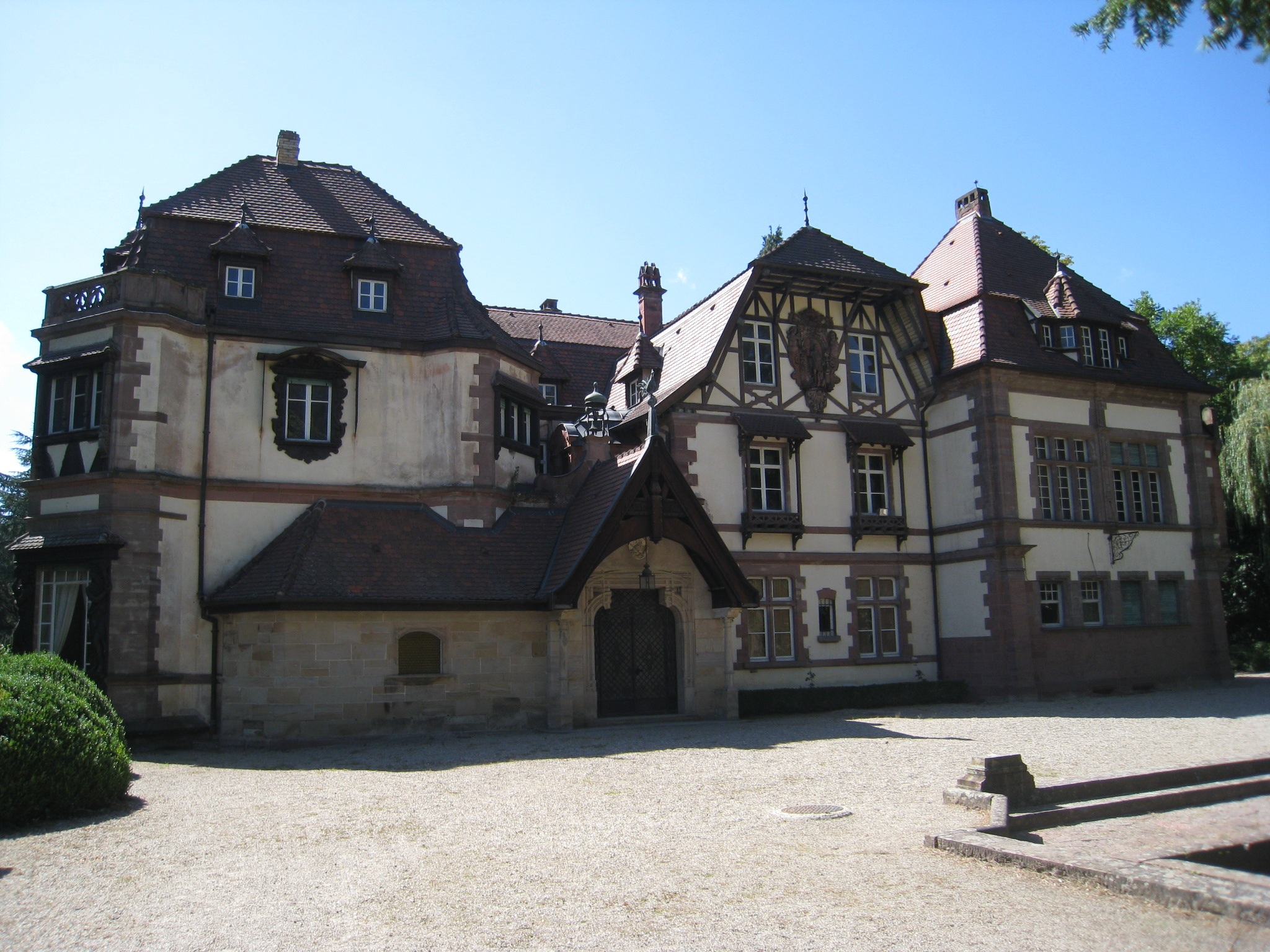
Château de la Léonardsau

Domaine de la Léonardsau is a château in the commune of Obernai, in the department of Bas-Rhin, Alsace, France. It is a listed historical monument since 1986.
