= John Stintzi =

Brother John B. Stintzi, SM
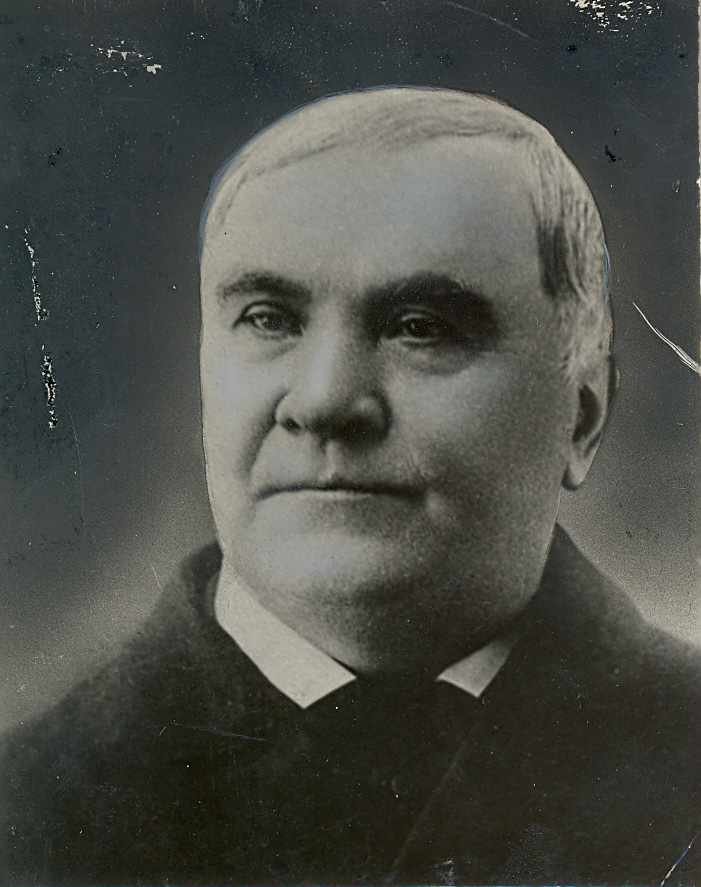

2nd President of the University of Dayton
- In office 1857–1860

Personal details
- Born: 10 November 1821 Sainte-Croix-en-Plaine, Alsace, France
- Died: 7 February 1900 (age 79) Dayton, Ohio, United States
- Occupation: Marianist brother, academic

John Baptist Stintzi, SM was an American Roman Catholic Marianist brother, educator, academic, and the second President of the University of Dayton. Born in 1821 in France, he joined the Marianists in 1837 and began teaching several years later. In 1849 he was sent to the United States and taught and led a variety of schools.

== Biography ==
=== Early life ===
Stintzi was born on 10 November 1821 in Sainte-Croix, Alsace, France. He joined the Society of Mary, or the Marianists, in 1837 at age 16 at Ebersmunster Abbey in Ebersmunster. He made his first profession of vows in 1839, followed by a year of scholasticate, after which he taught at various primary schools in Alsace.

=== Academic career ===
In 1849, he was teaching in the village of Obernai when the Rev. Leo Meyer, SM, Superior General of the Society of Mary, notified him that he was to be sent to the United States to open a school. With a certain Brother Zehler as his assistant, Stintzi was tasked with opening a Marianist school as part of the St. Paul Church parish in Cincinnati, Ohio. However, due to a misunderstanding with the St. Paul Church pastor as well as the delay of the Marianists' arrival, the school was not opened by the order. Father Meyer then transferred Stintzi to teach at Holy Trinity School, where he remained for five years. When he and three other brothers arrived, they were the first four Marianists to enter the Americas.

In the spring of 1854, Stintzi was offered leadership of St. Aloysius Orphan Asylum, located on Fourth Street in Cincinnati. He accepted, while continuing his responsibilities at Holy Trinity School, as he was expecting Marianist reinforcements in the fall. The reinforcements never came, forcing Stintzi to choose which school to devote himself to, a decision which ended with him choosing to leave Holy Trinity and work full-time at St. Aloysius. Father Meyer had encouraged Stintzi to choose St. Aloysius, because he believed it would be advantageous for the Marianist order. This mission would prove unsuccessful, and by November 1855, after a year and a half of hard work organizing the institution, the six Marianists working there were withdrawn. Most of the brothers were pleased to return to teaching in schools, or working at the motherhouse in Dayton, Ohio.

Next, Stintzi was sent to Louisville, Ohio, where Marianist Father August Rollinet had recently opened a small boarding school. In early 1956, the Bishop of Cleveland Louis Amadeus Rappe visited Louisville and met Stintzi. Rappe invited the Marianists there to Cleveland, and Father Meyer commissioned Stintzi to take charge of St. Patrick's School, a parochial primary school, in September 1856. At St. Patrick's, the first English school administered by the Marianists, he found a large amount of work set out for him. The classrooms were overcrowded, and the school's resources and equipment were mediocre at best, and even below average. Despite all this, Stintzi quickly achieved a reputation for excellent leadership and the school became known for the "best and most practical" education. Even the Cleveland Superintendent of Schools came to Stintzi for advice on questions pertaining to education, and recommended that his teachers "visit St. Patrick's on the West Side if they wanted to learn how to conduct an efficient class." After one year at St. Patrick's, Stintzi's great leadership caused the Superior, Father Meyer, to assign him the task of the reopening of St. Mary's Institute, which had just been rebuilt after a December 1855 fire. He remained at St. Mary's for three years, and returned to the helm of St. Patrick's in 1860.
