= Ulger =

French Catholic cleric (died 1149)

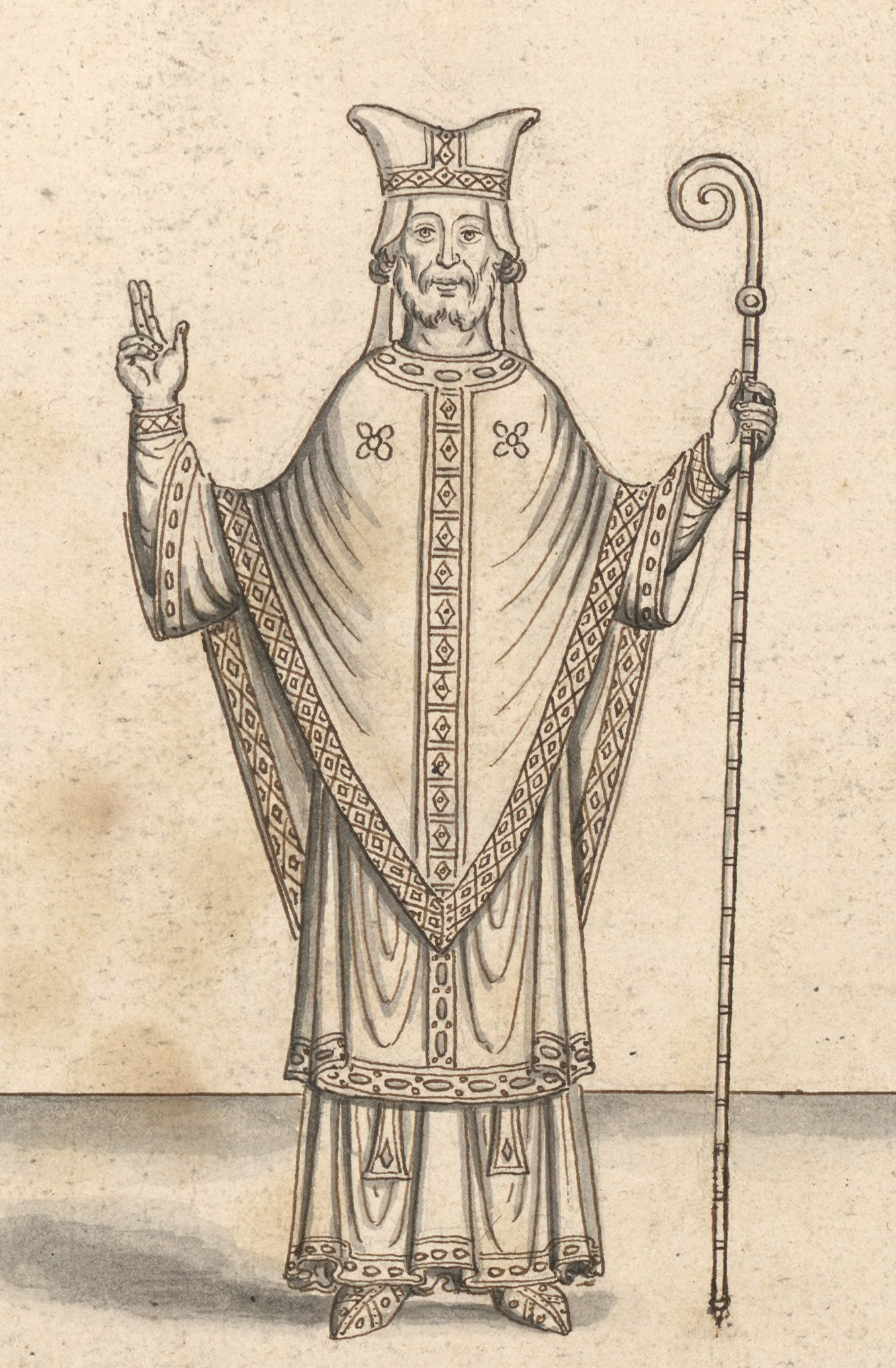
Drawing by the antiquarian François Roger de Gaignières (died 1715) after the depiction of Ulger in coloured enamel on copper on his tomb in the cathedral

Ulger (Ulgerius; died 1149) was the Bishop of Angers from 1125. Like his predecessor, Rainald de Martigné (died 1123), he consolidated the Gregorian reform in his diocese.

Ulger was a student of Marbod and the latter's successor as archdeacon. Ulger composed a eulogy for his teacher, crediting him with bringing genius (ingenium) and art (studium) to Anjou. He also compares his master to Cicero, Virgil and Homer: "Cicero gives way to him, Virgil as well and Homer: there I may say he has defeated them equally".

Shortly after becoming bishop, Ulger entered into a dispute with Glanfeuil Abbey, whose abbot, Drogo, rejected the authority of the bishop over his monastery and even had a papal bull forged to support his claim. As bishop, Ulger established several new parish churches, began renovation to Angers Cathedral and constructed a hospice at Saint-Maimboeuf. In the 1140s, Ulger also got involved in a dispute with Fontevraud Abbey, which became an international scandal. The abbess Petronilla accused the bishop's men of having despoiled the property of laymen, named Basset, who was a friend of the abbey's. The victim went to Rome to appeal to Pope Innocent II directly, while the celebrated Bernard de Clairvaux wrote an angry letter to Ulger (in which he first described the incident as a scandalum). The pope appointed a panel of five bishops to decide the case—which really concerned the abbey's rights in Les Ponts-de-Cé—and in 1149 the bishopric was ordered to pay restitution to Basset of 1,000 marks.

Ulger was a supporter of the Angevin ruling family. He supported Count Geoffrey Plantagenet when the latter invaded Normandy and he supported his wife, the Empress Matilda, in the English civil war. In 1139, at the Second Lateran Council, Ulger asserted publicly (and incorrectly) that Matilda had been anointed empress by Pope Pascal II. He also supported the Knights Templar, who had close connections to the Angevin dynasty. Sometime after the fall of Edessa, between 1144 and 1149, in light of the new crusading impetus, he urged his clergy to promote the Templars throughout the diocese and strongly commended their holy way of life.

Ulger was buried in an enamelled sarcophagus. Inside his tomb were found cloths were (pseudo-)Arabic lettering, a ring with a Latin transcription from Arabic and a boxes of a Spanish style, all suggesting that Ulger had contacts with Spain during his lifetime. The metal- and enamelwork on his tomb is probably of Spanish origin.

== Sources ==
- Bienvenu, Jean-Marc (1972). "Le conflit entre Ulger, évêque d'Angers, et Petronille de Chemille, abbesse de Fontevrault (vers 1140–1149)". Revue Mabillon. 53 (248): 113–32.
- Bloch, Herbert (1952). "The Schism of Anacletus II and the Glanfeuil Forgeries of Peter the Deacon of Monte Cassino". Traditio. 8: 159–264.
- Bond, Gerald A. (1986). "Iocus amoris: The Poetry of Baudri of Bourgueil and the Formation of the Ovidian Subculture". Traditio. 42: 143–93.
- Hildburgh, W. L. (1942). "Varieties of Circumstantial Evidence in the Study of Mediaeval Enameling". Speculum. 17 (3): 390–401. doi:10.2307/2853309.
- Leyser, Karl (1960). "England and the Empire in the Early Twelfth Century". Transactions of the Royal Historical Society. Fifth Series. 10: 61–83. doi:10.2307/3678774.
- Schenk, Jochen (2012). Templar Families: Landowning Families and the Order of the Temple in France, c. 1120–1307. Cambridge: Cambridge University Press.
- Tuten, Belle Stoddard (2001). "Politics, Holiness, and Property in Angers, 1080–1130". French Historical Studies. 24 (4): 601–19. doi:10.1215/00161071-24-4-601.
- Venarde, Bruce L. (1997). Women's Monasticism and Medieval Society: Nunneries in France and England, 890–1215. Ithaca: Cornell University Press.
- Urseau, Charles-Théodore (1896). "Le tombeau de l'évêque Ulger dans la cathédrale d'Angers". Comptes rendus des séances de l'Académie des Inscriptions et Belles-Lettres. 40 (5): 411–12. doi:10.3406/crai.1896.70859.
- Wollin, Carsten. “Die Sprichwörter und Epigramme des Ulgerius von Angers.” Proverbium, 29 (2012), 341-372
