= Charles-Émile Freppel =

French bishop and politician (1827–1891)

- Bishop of Angers
- Charles-Émile Freppel in ecclesiastical attire, photograph by Pierre Petit
- Church: Catholic Church
- Diocese: Diocese of Angers
- In office: 21 March 1870 – 12 December 1891
- Predecessor: Guillaume Angebault
- Successor: François-Désiré Mathieu

Orders
- Ordination: 23 November 1849
- Consecration: 18 April 1870 by Ferdinand-François-Auguste Donnet

Personal details
- Born: 1 June 1827 Obernai, Bas-Rhin, Kingdom of France
- Died: 12 December 1891 (aged 64) Angers, Maine-et-Loire, France
- Motto: Sponte Favos Œgre Spicula

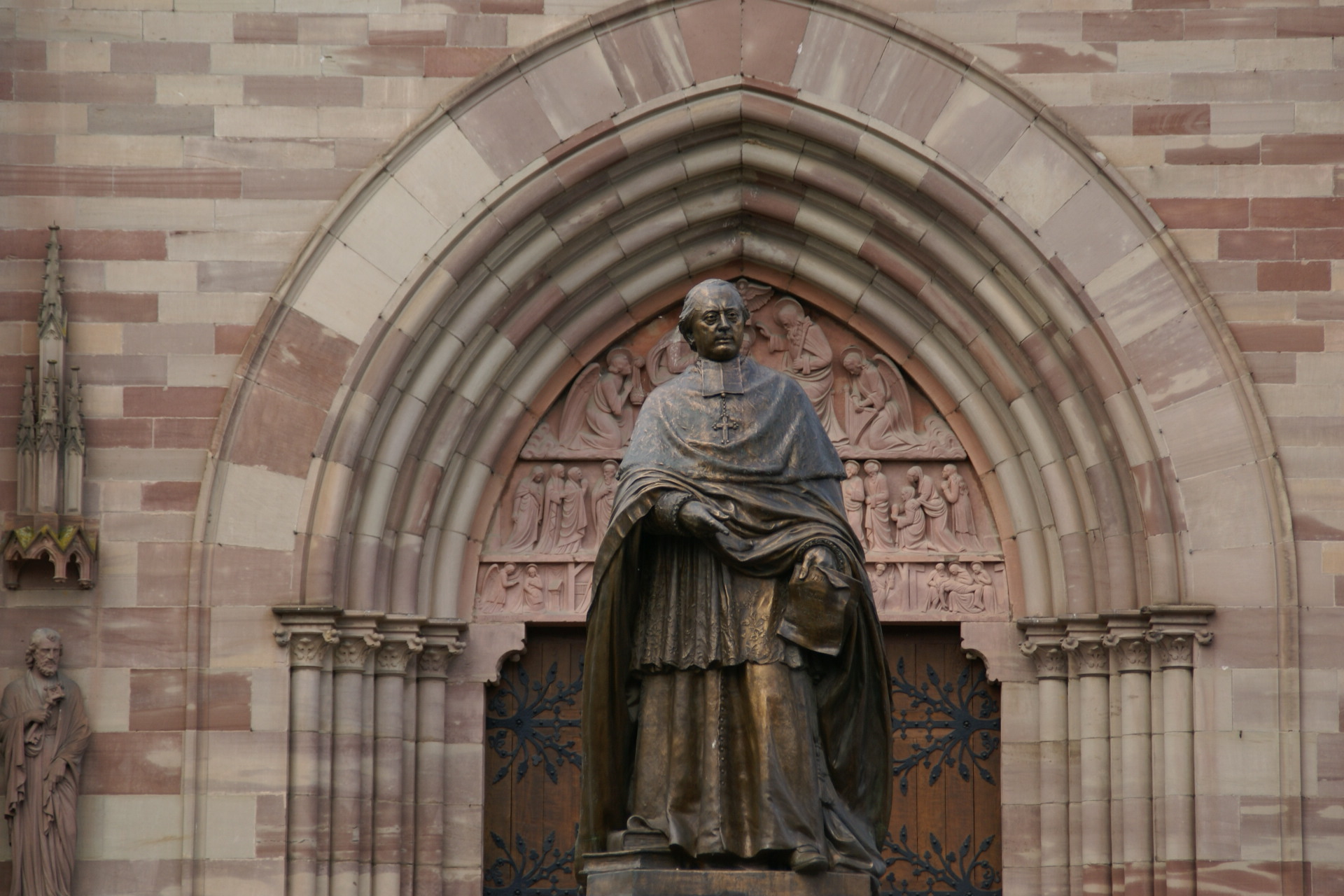
Statue of Charles-Émile Freppel in front of Saints-Pierre-et-Paul-Church in Obernai, France

Charles-Émile Freppel (1 June 1827 – 12 December 1891), French bishop and politician, was born at Obernai (Alsace).

He was ordained priest in 1849 and for a short time taught history at the seminary of Strasbourg, where he had previously received his clerical training. In 1854, he was appointed professor of theology at the Sorbonne, and became known as a successful preacher. He went to Rome in 1869, at the instance of Pius IX, to assist in the steps preparatory to the promulgation of the dogma of papal infallibility. In 1870, he was consecrated bishop of Angers by Ferdinand-François-Auguste Donnet.

During the Franco-German war, Freppel organized a body of priests to minister to the French prisoners in Germany, and penned an eloquent protest to the emperor William I. against the annexation of Alsace-Lorraine. In 1880 he was elected deputy for Brest and continued to represent it until his death. Being the only priest in the Chamber of Deputies since the death of Dupanloup, he became the chief parliamentary champion of the Church, and, though no orator, was a frequent speaker.

On all ecclesiastical affairs Freppel voted with the Royalist and Catholic party, yet on questions in which French colonial prestige was involved, such as the expedition to Tunis, Tong-King, Madagascar (1881, 1883–85), he supported the government of the day. He always remained a staunch Royalist and went so far as to oppose Leo XIII's policy of conciliating the Republic. He died at Angers on 12 December 1891.

Freppel's historical and theological works form 30 vols, the best known of which are:

- Les Pères apostoliques et leur époque (1859)
- Les Apologistes chrétiens au II^{e} siècle (2 vols, 1860)
- Saint Irénée et l'éloquence chrétienne dans la Gaule pendant les deux premiers siècles (1861)
- Tertullien (2 vols, 1863)
- Saint Cyprien et l'Eglise d'Afrique (1864)
- Clément d'Alexandrie (1865)
- Origène (2 vols, 1867)

There are interesting lives by E Cornut (Paris, 1893) and F Charpentier (Angers, 1904).

== See also ==
- Listing of the works of Alexandre Falguière
