= Obernai =

- Commune
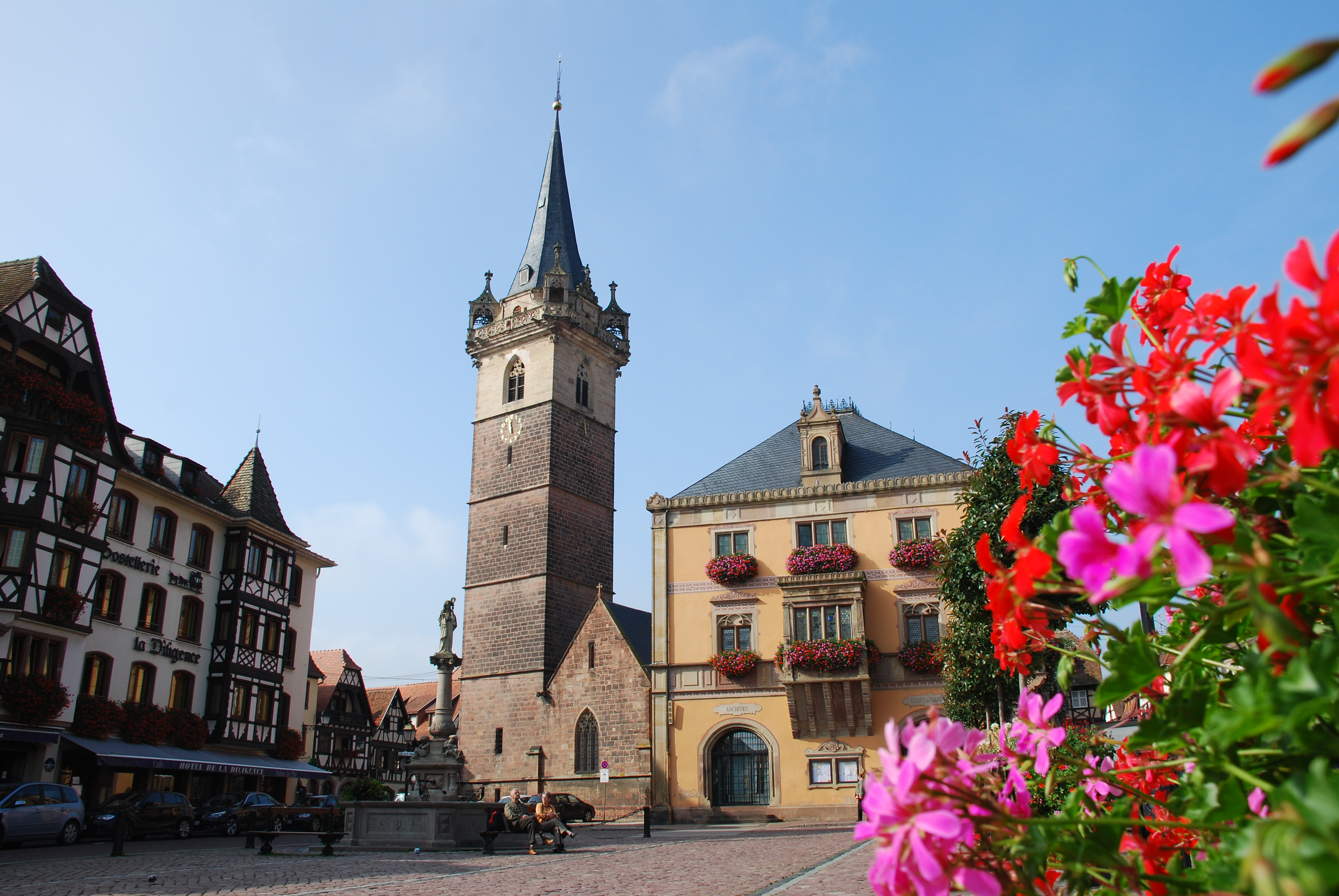
- Place du marché

- Coat of arms
- Location of Obernai
- Location within France Location within Grand Est
- Coordinates: 48°28′N 7°29′E
- Country: France
- Region: Grand Est
- Department: Bas-Rhin
- Arrondissement: Sélestat-Erstein
- Canton: Obernai

Government
  - Mayor (from March, 2026): Robin Clauss
- Area^{1}: 25.78 km^{2} (9.95 sq mi)
- Elevation: 185 m (607 ft)
- Highest elevation: 572 m (1,877 ft)
- Lowest elevation: 156 m (512 ft)
- Population (2023): 12,587
  - Density: 488.2/km^{2} (1,265/sq mi)
- Time zone: UTC+01:00 (CET)
  - Summer (DST): UTC+02:00 (CEST)
- INSEE/Postal code: 67348 /67210
- ^{1} French Land Register data, which excludes lakes, ponds, glaciers > 1 km^{2} (0.386 sq mi or 247 acres) and river estuaries.

Obernai (Alsatian: Owernah; German: Oberehnheim) is a commune in the Bas-Rhin department in Alsace in north-eastern France. It lies on the eastern slopes of the Vosges mountains.

Obernai is a rapidly growing city, its number of inhabitants having gone up from 6,304 in 1968 to 12,587 in 2023.

== History ==
A Neolithic necropole has been uncovered dating between 5,000 and 4,600 BC; 27 individuals were buried there in wooden coffins. This appears to be a continuation of groups from the Linear Pottery culture who were located also on the eastern side of the Rhine.

The Obernai region, which was the property of the dukes of Alsace in the 7th century, is the birthplace of St. Odile, daughter of the Duke, who would become the Patron Saint of Alsace.

The Obernai name first appears in 1240, when the village acquires the status of town under the tutelage of the Hohenstaufen family. The town then prospered. It became a member of the Décapole in 1354, an alliance of ten towns of the Holy Roman Empire in Alsace. Obernai's status reaches its apex in the 15th and 16th century. In 1562, Emperor Ferdinand I visited the prosperous town of Obernai.

The Thirty Years' War (1618–1648) damaged the town, which was occupied by the Imperial troops, then by the Swedes. The town was ransomed and ceded to France in 1679, and started to recover some of its prosperity, without totally recapturing its former glory.

The town was annexed by Germany in 1871 with the rest of Alsace, then returned to France after World War I in 1918. During the German occupation in the Second World War, the Nazi authorities set up the Reichsschule für SS Helferinnen Oberenheim, a Waffen-SS women's training centre, which opened in May 1942 upon the order of Heinrich Himmler.

== Population ==
Historical population
| Year | Pop. | ±% p.a. |
|---|---|---|
| 1968 | 6,304 | — |
| 1975 | 7,902 | +3.28% |
| 1982 | 8,907 | +1.73% |
| 1990 | 9,610 | +0.95% |
| 1999 | 10,471 | +0.96% |
| 2007 | 10,947 | +0.56% |
| 2012 | 10,822 | −0.23% |
| 2017 | 11,279 | +0.83% |
| 2023 | 12,587 | +1.85% |
Source: INSEE

== Economy ==
Obernai is an important center of wine and beer production, as well as a touristic destination. The industrial activity features the following companies: Hager, Kronenbourg, Triumph, Sobovia, Supra and Stoeffler. The historical wine of the city is called the Vin du Pistolet in reference to a local legend.

== Education ==
During the mid-1800s, Obernai was home to a Marianist primary school.

== Sights ==
- Domaine de la Léonardsau (19th century – early 20th century): current museum of the horse and the horse carriage.
- Truttenhausen abbey (in ruin): old monastery of the regular canons of St-Augustin (15th century).
- Gail Castle (1826–27): Currently the Freppel High School
- Oberkirch Castle: rebuilt between 1843 and 1846 with the characteristics of an older fortified castle of the 16th or 17th century.
- El Biar Castle: Built between 1864 and 1865 on the site of an old flour mill, by General de Vives (1802, 1884); it is named after a residential section of Algiers.
- Old six-bucket well (1579)
- Clocktower (Kappelturm)
- Wheat Market (Halle aux Blés)
- Romanesque house in the rue des Pèlerins
- Old Synagogue

== Notable people ==
=== Born in Obernai ===
- Nicolas Léonard Beker
- Jean-Victor Hocquard (1910–1995), musicologist
- Charles-Émile Freppel
- Thomas Murner
- André Neher
- Charles Pisot
- René Schickele
- Morgan Schneiderlin

=== Active in Obernai ===
- John Stintzi, Marianist brother and academic, taught in the village during the 1840s

== See also ==
- Klevener de Heiligenstein, a wine style produced in Obernai
- Communes of the Bas-Rhin department
