= François-Désiré Mathieu =

French Bishop and Cardinal

His Eminence François-Désiré Mathieu
- Archbishop Emeritus of Toulouse
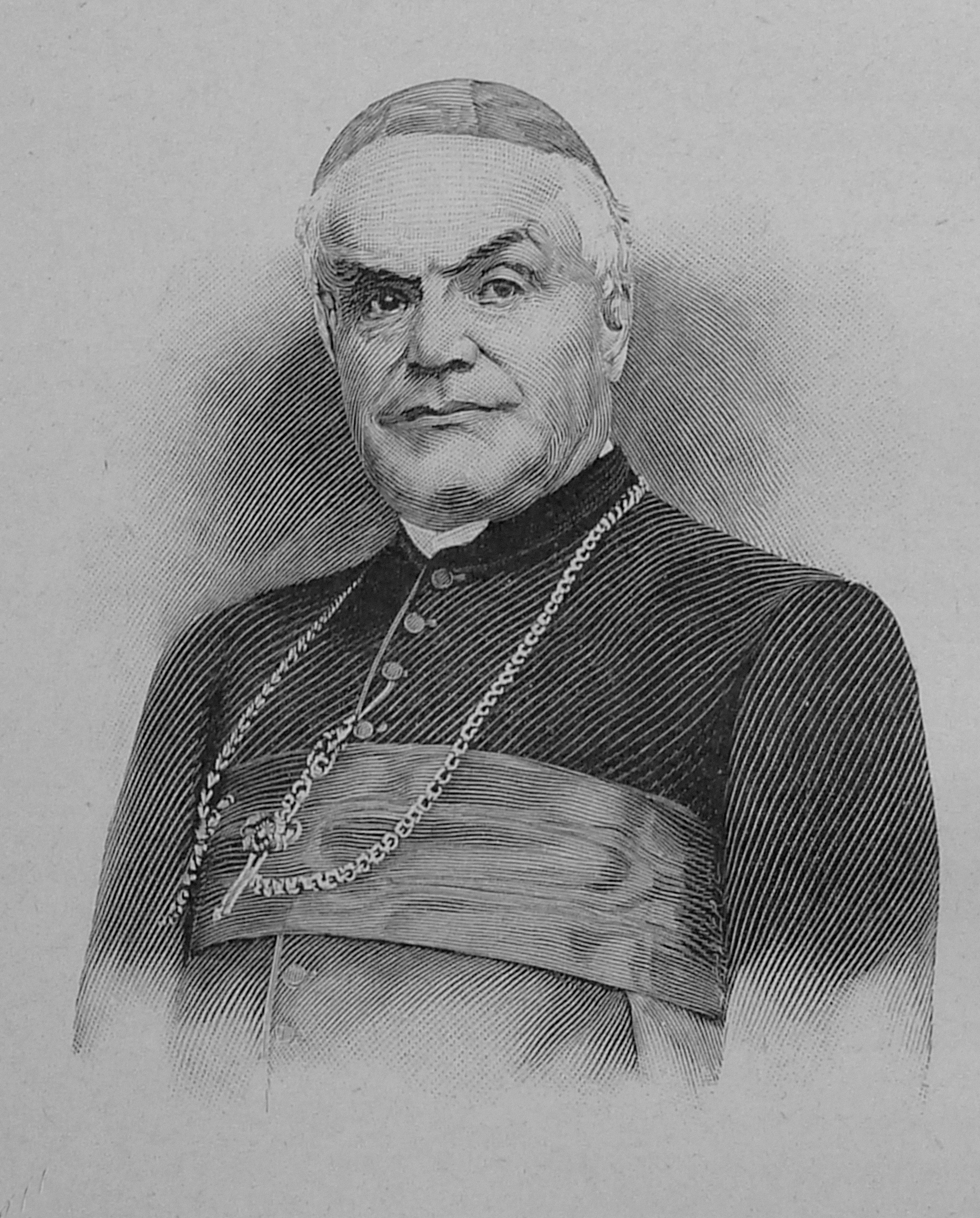
- Mathieu as depicted in a 1908 portrait.
- Church: Roman Catholic Church
- Archdiocese: Toulouse
- See: Toulouse
- Appointed: 25 June 1896
- Term ended: 27 November 1899
- Predecessor: Florian-Jules-Félix Desprez
- Successor: Jean-Augustin Germain
- Other post: Cardinal-Priest of Santa Sabina (1899-1908)
- Previous posts: Bishop of Angers (1893-96); Camerlengo of the College of Cardinals (1905-06)

Orders
- Ordination: 30 May 1863
- Consecration: 20 March 1893 by Guillaume-René Meignan
- Created cardinal: 19 June 1899 by Pope Leo XIII
- Rank: Cardinal-Priest

Personal details
- Born: François-Désiré Mathieu; 27 May 1839 Einville-au-Jard, Meurthe-et-Moselle, Kingdom of the French
- Died: 26 October 1908 (aged 69) London, England, United Kingdom
- Parents: François Mathieu; Felicité George
- Motto: Obesse nemini prodesse omnibus
- Coat of arms

François-Désiré Mathieu (27 May 1839, Einville-au-Jard, Meurthe-et-Moselle – 26 October 1908, London) was a French Bishop and Cardinal.

== Biography ==
He made his studies in the diocesan school and the seminary of the Diocese of Nancy, and was ordained priest in 1863. He was engaged successively as professor in the school (petit séminaire) of Pont-à-Mousson, chaplain to the Dominicanesses at Nancy (1879), and parish priest of Saint-Martin at Pont-à-Mousson (1890). Meanwhile, he had won the Degree of Doctor of Letters with a Latin and a French thesis, the latter being honoured with a prize from the Académie française for two years.

On 3 January 1893, he was nominated to the Bishopric of Angers, was preconized on 19 January, and consecrated on 20 March. He succeeded Charles Émile Freppel, one of the most remarkable bishops of his time, and set himself to maintain all his predecessor's good works. To these he added the work of facilitating the education of poor children destined for the priesthood. He inaugurated the same enterprise in the Diocese of Toulouse, to which he was transferred three years later (30 May 1896) by a formal order of Pope Leo XIII. In his new see he laboured, in accordance with the views of this pontiff, to rally Catholics to the French Government.

With this aim he wrote the Devoir des catholiques, an episcopal charge which attracted wide attention and earned for him the pope's congratulations. In addition he was summoned to Rome to be a cardinal at the curia (19 June 1899).

Having resigned the See of Toulouse (14 December 1899), his activities were thenceforward absorbed in the work of the Roman congregations and some secret diplomatic negotiations. Nevertheless, he found leisure to write on the Concordat of 1801 and the conclave of 1903.

In 1907 he was admitted to the Académie française with a discourse which attracted much notice. Death came to him unexpectedly next year in London, whither he had gone to assist at the Eucharistic Congress.

== Works ==
Under a somewhat commonplace exterior he had an inquiring mind. His works include;

- "De Joannis abbatis Gorziensis vita" (Nancy 1878);
- "L'Ancien Régime dans la Province de Lorraine et Barrois" (Paris, 1871; 3rd ed., 1907);
- "Le Concordat de 1801" (Paris, 1903);
- "Les derniers jours de Leon XIII et le conclave de 1903" (Paris, 1904);
- "L'Ancien Régime En Lorraine Et Barrois, d'Après Des Documents Inédits: 1698-1789";
- "Instruction Pastorale de de Monseigneur L'Archeveque de Toulouse sur les Devoirs des Catholiques a l'heure presente et Mandement pour le Careme de l'an de grâce 1897";
- "Oeuvres".

A new edition of his works began to appear in Paris, July, 1910.
