= Abbey of St. Sergius, Angers =

Ancient abbey in Angers, France

Coordinates: 47.4762°N 0.5465°W

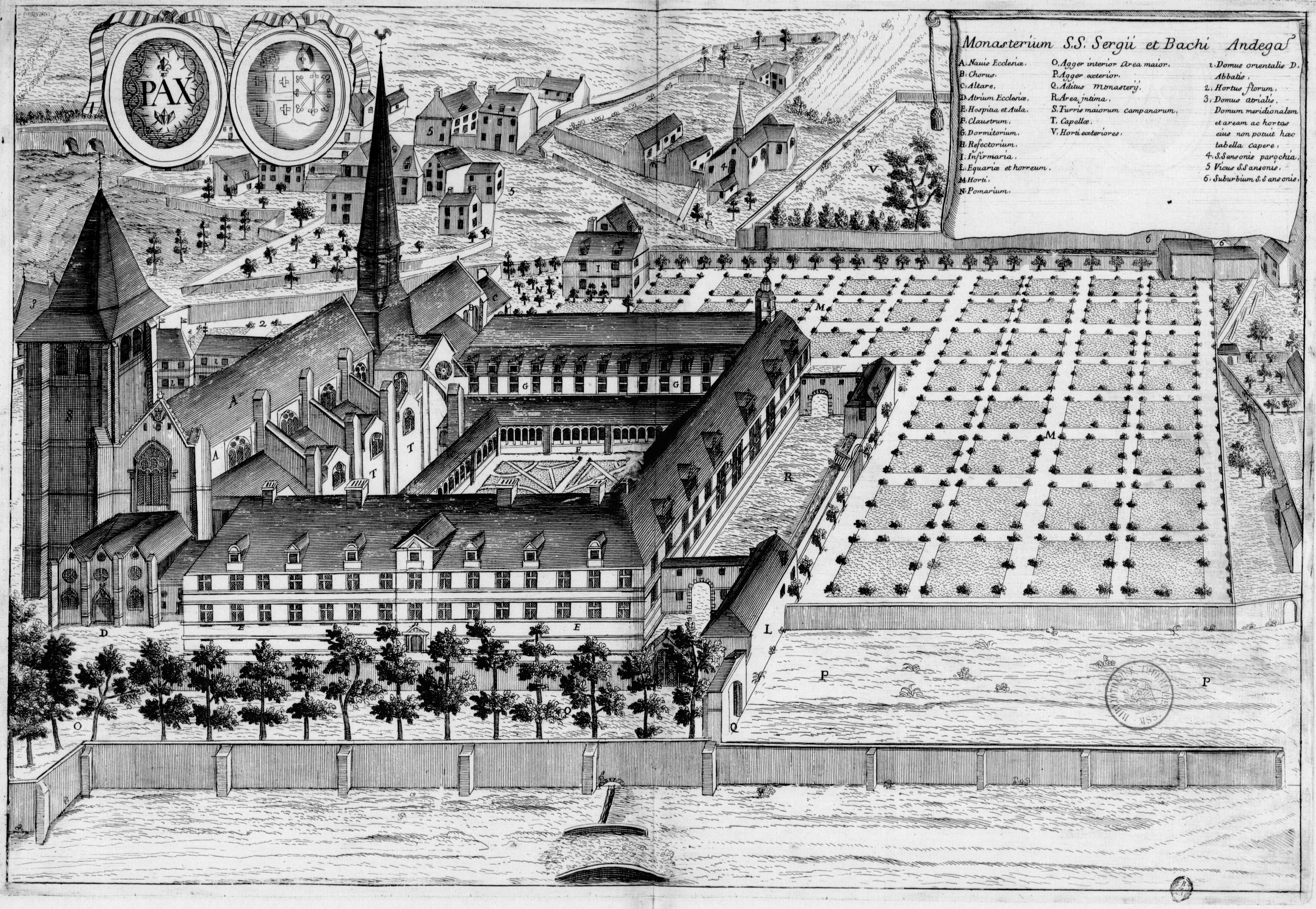
17th-century engraving of the abbey from the Monasticon Gallicanum

The Abbey of St. Sergius, more fully the Abbey of Saints Sergius and Bacchus, in Angers (French: Abbaye Saint-Serge d'Angers or Abbaye des Saints Serge et Bacchus d'Angers) was a Benedictine monastery in France.

== History ==
It was founded probably in the early 7th century, and is mentioned in a diploma dated 705 of Childebert IV ("monasterio quod est in honore pecularis patroni nostri sancti Sergii et domini Medardi episcopi"). Rainon, bishop of Angers, set up a college of canons there in around 900, when the monastery came under the control of the diocese.

It became a monastery again when Bishop Renaud II introduced a Benedictine community in around 1000. It was then rebuilt, under the patronage of the counts of Anjou, and reconsecrated in 1059 with a dedication to Saints Sergius and Bacchus.

The abbey's location outside the city walls exposed it to pillage during the Hundred Years' War and the Wars of Religion. It was placed under commendatory abbots in 1590.

In 1629 the abbey joined the reformist movement of the Congregation of St Maur.

It was dissolved in 1790 in the French Revolution. The former abbey church became a parish church, while the conventual buildings, after use as a seminary and a college, are now in use as the Lycée Joachim-du-Bellay.

Of the surviving buildings, the church was listed as a monument historique in 1840. The chapter room and the chapel were classed in 1907, the refectory in 1908 and the central building and part of the cloister in 1967.

== Bibliography ==
- R. P. Dom J.-M. Besse: Abbayes et prieurés de l'ancienne France, vol. 8:"Province ecclésiastique de Tours"
- Dom Léon Guilloreau: Prieurés anglais de la dépendance de Saint-Serge d'Angers. In: Revue Mabillon, 1908, pp. 433–484
- Luce Pietri, "Angers". In: Luce Pietri and Jacques Biarne, Topographie chrétienne des cités de la Gaule, vol. V., Province ecclésiastique de Tours (Lugdunensis Tertia). De Boccard, Paris, 1987, pp. 67–81
- François Comte and Jean Siraudeau: Documents d'évaluation du patrimoine archéologique des villes de France: Angers. Centre National d'Archéologie Urbaine, Tours, 1990
- François Comte, Le territoire d’Angers du dixième au treizième siècle: naissance des bourgs et faubourgs monastiques et canoniaux. In: "Anjou, Medieval Art, Architecture and "Arhaeiology": Conference Transactions XXVI. The British Archaeological Association, Leeds, 2003
