= Gabriel Bouvery =

Gabriel Bouvery (died 1572) was a French bishop of Angers, successor to Jean V Olivier who died 12 April 1540.

== Nomination and episcopacy ==
François I of France intervened with the chapter of Angers Cathedral, imposing the nomination of Bouvery. The king had taken the 1534 Affair of the Placards badly, as far as his attitude to toleration of Protestants went. Bouvery was the nephew of Guillaume Poyet, a courtier close to the king and son of Pierre Poyet who had been mayor of Angers. It was a political appointment aimed at royal control in the Catholic Church, in a successor to the late Jean V Olivier.

In 1553 Bouvert consecrated the new church of Notre-Dame-des-Ardilliers in Saumur, founded by Olivier. He worked to implement the decisions of the Council of Trent, which he attended. Through his uncle, Bouvery became patron of Guillaume Postel; he was patron also of Jean Bodin.

== Role during the Wars of Religion ==
On the 1560 accession of Charles IX of France, religious war in France came into the open. Bouvery put in place an Angevin Catholic League, in 1567: it comprised 59 of the nobility, with others including Arthur de Cossé-Brissac, the bishop of Coutances. The diocese was spared the worst of the violence. Fighting continued to the Peace of Longjumeau (1568) and Peace of Saint-Germain-en-Laye (1570). Gabriel Bouvery died on 10 February 1572. He was succeeded by Guillaume Ruzé, bishop of Saint-Malo. Violence followed shortly in 1572 during the St Bartholomew's Day massacre of August; the governor Puygaillard of Anjou was then in Paris, but entrusted plans to attack Protestants in Saumur and Angers to Jean de Chambes, baron of Montsoreau. De Chambes's violence was rebuked on 14 September by the king.
