= Maurilius of Angers =

Bishop of Angers between 423 and 453, Saint

Saint Maurilius (French: Maurille) (c. 336 – 453), a priest originally from Milan, was the bishop of Angers between 423 and 453. He played an early role in the Christianization of Gaul.

== Legacy ==
In the seventh century, a devotion to St. Maurilius began. A biography of him was written by Magnobodus and, in 873, his body was transferred to the Cathedral of Angers, which had already been dedicated to St. Maurice. Two hundred years later, St. Maurilius was frequently mentioned together with St. Maurice as the patron saints of the Cathedral but eventually St. Maurice became the primary patron of the Cathedral. Nevertheless, on 16 August 1239, the remains of St. Maurilius were placed in a new urn but they were scattered in 1791, when the Cathedral was vandalized during the French Revolution. Only a few small parts were recovered and they are now kept at the Cathedral.

=== Places ===
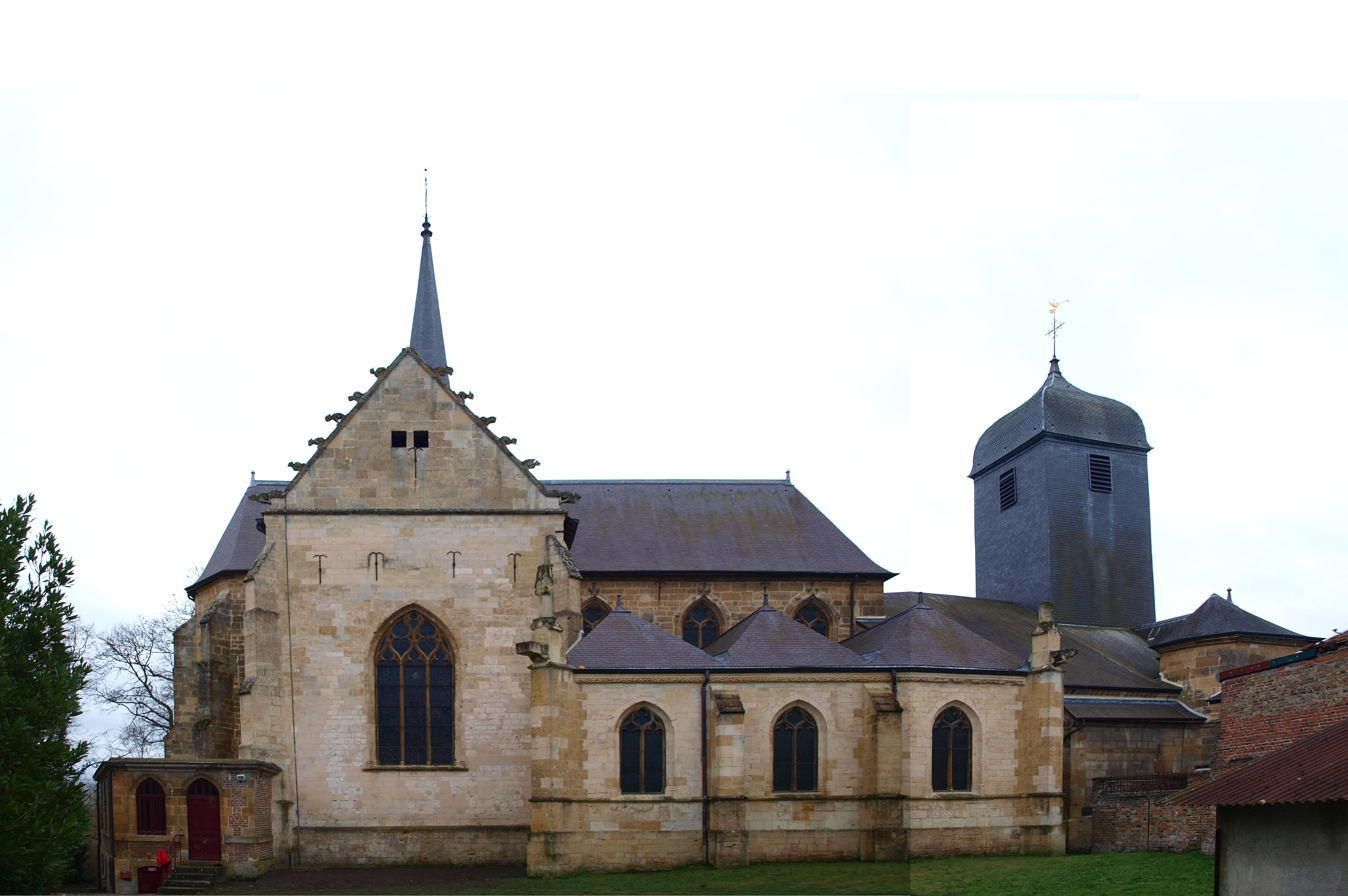
Saint-Maurille, Vouziers

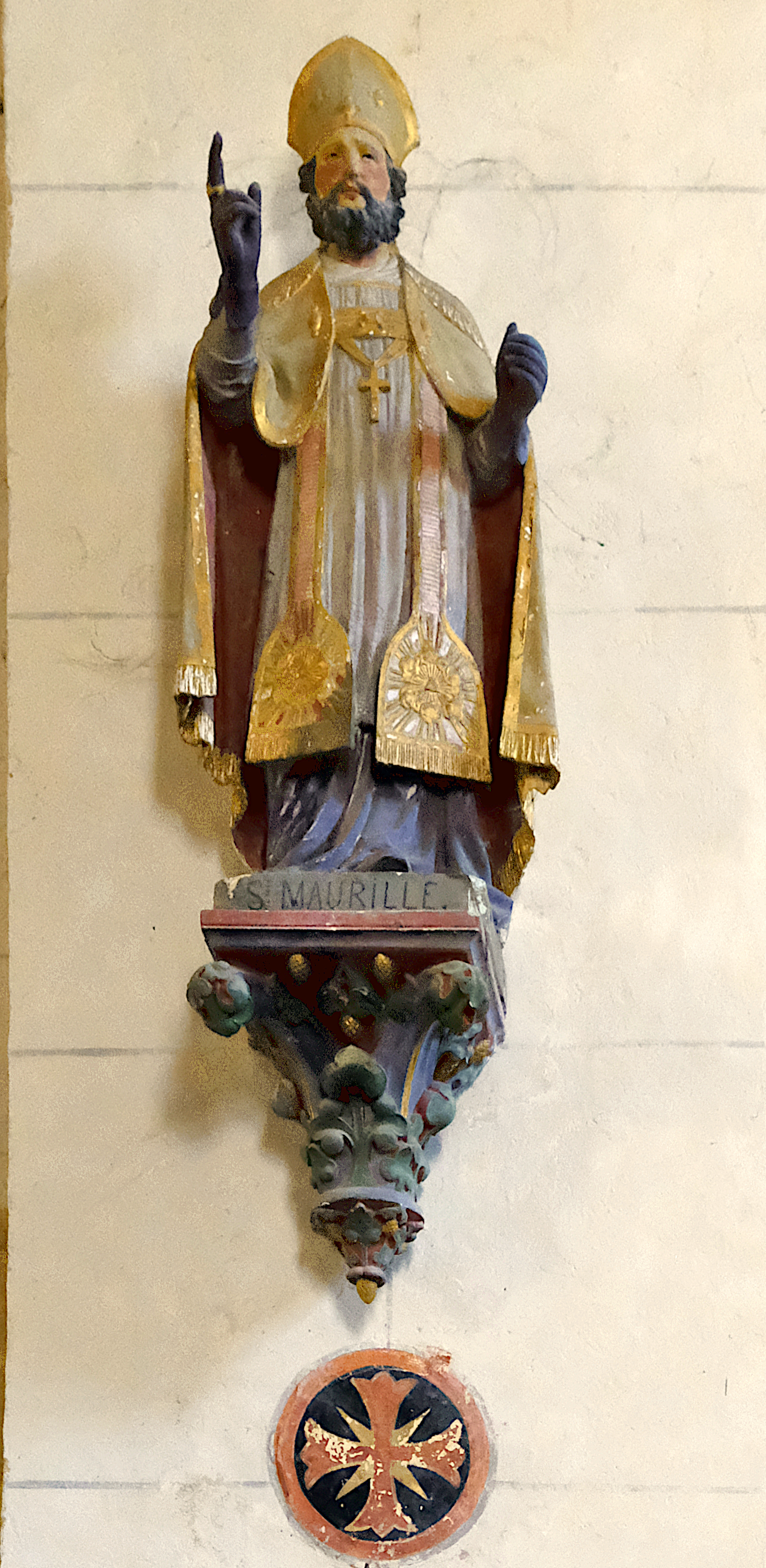
Statue of Saint Maurille in the church of Saint-Martin-de-Vertou in Grez-Neuville

In Vouziers, in the Ardennes region of France, the Église Saint-Maurille [Church of St. Maurilius] was dedicated to him in the twelfth century.

== Veneration ==
The feast day of St. Maurilius is 13 September. He is the patron saint of Angers, invoked by fishermen and gardeners. In art, he is represented as a bishop with a fish holding a key or a garden spade. He can be seen in one of the stained glass windows of the south side of the choir of the Cathedral of Angers and also in the tapestries of Angers from the 15th and 16th centuries.
