= Adelmann (bishop of Brescia) =

Bishop of Brescia, Italy (died 1061)

Adelmann (Latin: Adelmannus Leodiensis, Italian: Adelmanno di Liegi, French: Adelman de Liège, Dutch: Adelman van Luik, German: Adelmann von Lüttich; ?, – c. 1061, Brescia) was the bishop of Brescia, in Northern Italy, during the eleventh century. Adelmann seems to have become bishop there in 1050, and to have taken an active share in the church-reform movement of the period, especially against the clerical abuses of simony and concubinage.

Of unknown parentage and nationality, he was educated at the famous School of Chartres, in France, founded by Fulbert, and was considered one of his favourite scholars. Among his fellow students was Berengarius, to whom, at a later period, he addressed two letters. The second (incomplete) letter is a dogmatic exposition of Christian teaching on the Eucharist; the Benedictine editors of the Histoire littéraire de la France call it "one of the finest literary documents of the period."

Calvin called him "barbarus, imperitus, et sophista."
