= Diocese of Angers =

Catholic diocese in France

Coordinates: 47.47°N 0.56°W

Diocese of Angers Dioecesis Andegavensis Diocèse d'Angers

Catholic
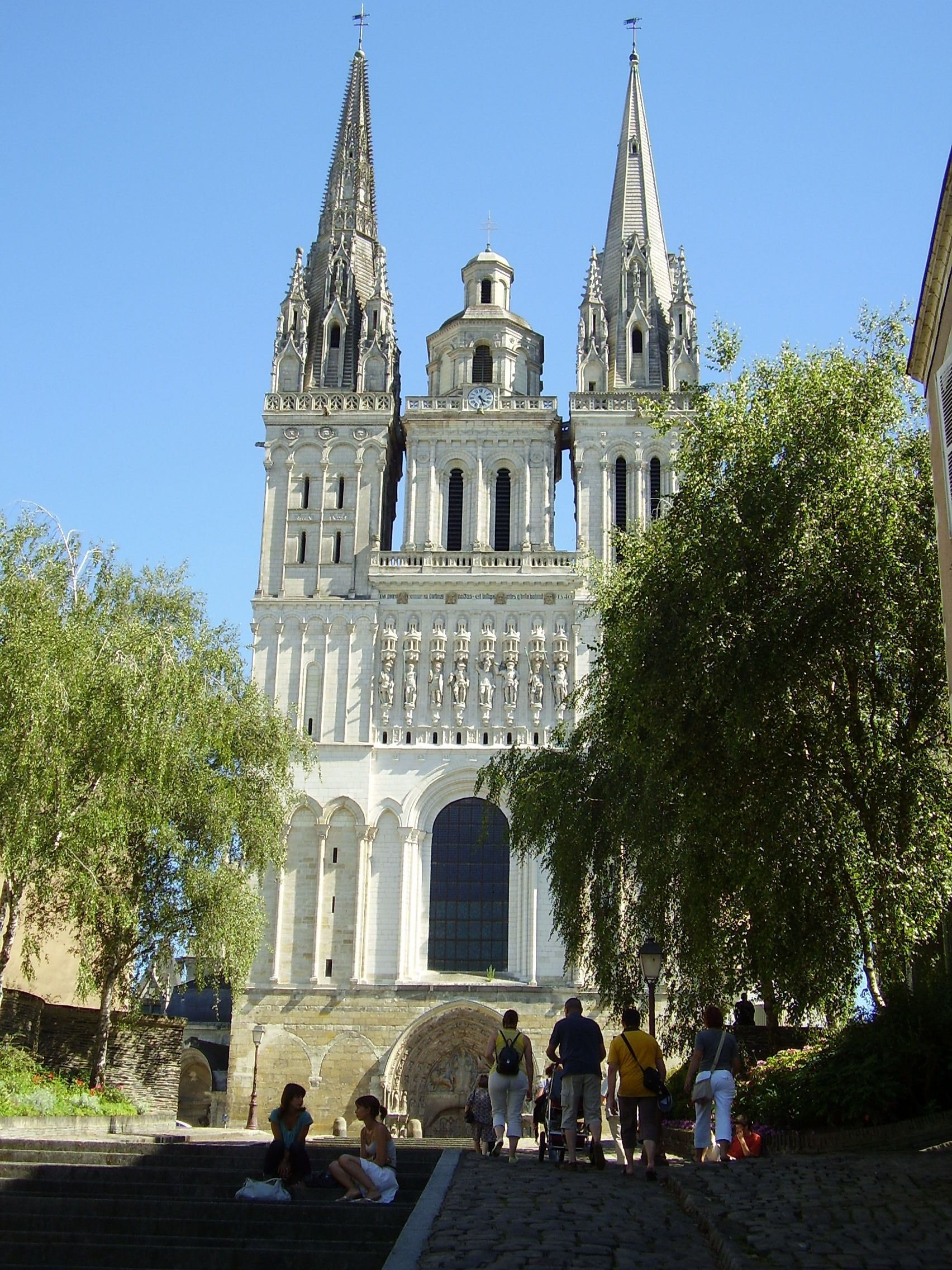
- Angers Cathedral

Location
- Country: France
- Ecclesiastical province: Rennes
- Metropolitan: Archdiocese of Rennes, Dol, and Saint-Malo

Statistics
- Area: 7,166 km^{2} (2,767 sq mi)
- Population: Total; Catholics: (as of 2022); 815,883; 586,000 (71.8%)
- Parishes: 60

Information
- Denomination: Roman Catholic
- Sui iuris church: Latin Church
- Rite: Roman Rite
- Established: 372
- Cathedral: Cathedral of St. Maurice in Angers
- Patron saint: Saint Maurice
- Secular priests: 153 (Diocesan); 46 (Religious Orders); 52 Permanent Deacons

Current leadership
- Pope: Leo XIV
- Bishop: Emmanuel Delmas
- Metropolitan Archbishop: Pierre d'Ornellas

Map

Website
- Website of the Diocese

The Diocese of Angers (Latin: Dioecesis Andegavensis; French: Diocèse d'Angers) is a Latin Church diocese of the Catholic Church in France. The episcopal see is located in Angers Cathedral in the city of Angers. The diocese extends over the entire department of Maine-et-Loire.

It was a suffragan see of the Archdiocese of Tours under the old regime as well as under the Concordat. Since the general reorganization of the French hierarchy of 8 December 2002, the diocese is a suffragan of the Archdiocese of Rennes, Dol, and Saint-Malo.

In 2022, in the Diocese of Angers there was one priest for every 2,944 Catholics.

== History ==
The first bishop of Angers known in history is Defensor, who was present in 372 at the election of the Bishop of Tours, and made a determined stand against the nomination of Martin of Tours. The legend concerning the earlier episcopate of a certain Auxilius, who converted nearly the entire province ca. 260–270; he is connected with the cycle of legends that centre about Firmin of Amiens, who is said to have evangelized Bauvais, and is contradicted by Angevin tradition from before the thirteenth century.

Among the names of the Diocese of Angers during the first centuries of its existence are those of Maurilius, disciple of Martin of Tours, and at an earlier period hermit of Chalonnes, who made a vigorous stand against idolatry, and died in 427. As for the tradition that Renatus, who had been raised from the dead by Maurilius, was Bishop of Angers for some time shortly before 450, it bases its claims to credibility on a late life of Maurilius written in 905 by the deacon Archinald, and circulated under the name of Gregory of Tours, and it seems to have no real foundation.

Thalassius, consecrated bishop in 453, has left a compendium of canon law, consisting of the decisions of the councils of the province of Tours; Licinius (Lezin), a courtier and constable of King Chlothar I who appointed him Count of Anjou, was bishop from 586 to 616.

Berengarius, the heresiarch condemned for his doctrines on the Holy Eucharist, was Archdeacon of Angers about 1039, and for some time found a protector in the person of Eusebius Bruno, Bishop of Angers. Bernier, who played a great role in the wars of La Vendée and in the negotiations that led to the Concordat, was curé of St. Laud in Angers.

Among the Bishops of Angers in modern times were:

- Cardinal Jean Balue (1467) confined (1469–1480) by Louis XI, most of the time at Chinon, for his traitorous negotiations with Charles the Bold
- Henri Arnauld (1649–1693), a Jansenist, and author of the controversial catechism for the dioceses of Angers, La Rochelle and Luçon (1676). He also had published a large collection of the statutes of the diocese of Angers, from the 13th to the 17th century.
- Charles-Émile Freppel (1870–1891), who had a seat in the Chamber of Deputies, and warmly defended Catholic interests.
- François-Désiré Mathieu (1893–1896), cardinal of the Roman Curia and member of the French Academy.

=== Diocesan synods ===
A diocesan synod was an irregularly held, but important, meeting of the bishop of a diocese and his clergy. Its purpose was (1) to proclaim generally the various decrees already issued by the bishop; (2) to discuss and ratify measures on which the bishop chose to consult with his clergy; (3) to publish statutes and decrees of the diocesan synod, of the provincial synod, and of the Holy See.

Bishop Nicolas Gellent (1260–1291) held diocesan synods, usually at Pentecost and/or the Feast of Saint Luke (October 18), in 1261, in 1262, in 1263, 1265, 1266, 1269, 1270, 1271, 1272, 1273, 1274, 1275, 1276, 1277, 1280, 1281, 1282, and 1291. Bishop Guillaume Le Maire (1291–1314) held synods in 1291, 1292, 1293, 1294, 1295, 1298, 1299, 1300, 1302, 1303, 1304, 1312, and 1314. Bishop Foulques de Mathefelon (1324–1355) held diocesan synods in 1326, 1327, and 1328.

Bishop Jean Michel (1439–1447) held a diocesan synod at Pentecost 1442. Bishop Jean de Rely (1492–1499) presided at a diocesan synod in 1493.

A diocesan synod was held in 1499, under the auspices of Bishop François de Rohan (1499–1532), but presided over by his vicar-general; another was held in 1503, and again in 1504, 1505, 1507, 1508, 1509, 1510, 1511, 1512, 1513, 1514, 1517, 1519, 1520, 1521, and 1523; another was held at Pentecost in 1524, but presided over by his suffragan (or coadjutor), Bishop Jean Rouault of Rheon; in 1525, 1526, 1527, and 1528. In 1533, 1534, 1535, 1536, 1537, and 1539, Bishop Jean Olivier (1532–1540) presided over a diocesan synod. Bishop Gabriel Bouvery (1540–1572) held synods in 1540, 1541, 1542, 1543, 1544, 1547, 1551, 1552, 1554, 1558, and 1564; in 1565, he held a diocesan synod, warning pastors to reside in their parishes and carry out their canonical duties. Bishop Guillaume Ruzé (1572–1587) held a diocesan synod at Pentecost 1586. Vicars of Bishop-elect Charles Miron (1588–1616) held a diocesan synod in 1588, since he was only 18 years old when appointed in 1598, and too young to be ordained a priest or bishop; other synods were held in 1589, in 1594 and in 1595, 1598 and 1600. The synod of 1600 was particularly vigorous, with 26 canons, calling for clerical residence in their benefices, requiring preachers to warn against attending Protestant services, and demanding better education for the clergy. Other synods were held in 1601, in 1605, in 1606, in 1610, in 1612, in 1613, in 1614, and in 1615.

Bishop Guillaume Fouquet (1616–1621) held a diocesan synod in 1617, and published extensive Statutes in French. Bishop Charles Miron (1622–1627) held a synod in October 1622. Two synods were held by Bishop Claude de Rueil (1628–1649), in 1634 and 1637.

Bishop Henri Arnauld (1650–1692) held a diocesan synod at Pentecost 1651. On each occasion of a synod, an address by the bishop ("Exhortation") preceded the publication of the statutes. All Arnaud's publications were in French. Another took place at Pentecost 1652. On 20 May 1652, Arnaud issued a separate ordonnance, forbidding residents of the diocese to enter taverns on Sunday, or to visit taverns and public fêtes on holy days while church services were in progress. He held another synod at Pentecost 1653, and at Pentecost 1654, the latter having 32 statutes. On 12 June 1654, Bishop Arnaud published a decree forbidding dueling; his strong stand brought a letter of thanks and appreciation from King Louis XIV. Another synod was held at Pentecost 1655, producing 19 statutes, and another in 1656, and again in 1657 with 21 statutes. There was another synod at Pentecost 1658, in 1659, in 1660, in 1661, in 1662, in 1663 (which produced 7 statutes), in 1664, in 1665, in 1666, in 1667 (which produced 10 statutes), in 1668 (which produced 8 statutes), in 1669, in 1670 (which produced 2 statutes), in 1671, in 1672, in 1673, in 1674, in 1675, in 1676 (which produced 7 statutes), in 1677 (which produced 3 statutes), in 1678, and in 1679 (which produced 4 statutes).

Having returned from Paris, where he subscribed to a declaration of the French hierarchy in favor of Pope Clement XI's bull "Unigenitus", Bishop Michel Poncet de la Rivière (1706–1730) held a diocesan synod on 16 May 1714, in which he preached a powerful denunciation of Jansenism. He held another synod on 28 May 1721, in which he mourned the passing of Pope Clement XI, who was strongly anti-Jansenist. Bishop Jean de Vaugirault (1731–1758), who had been Vicar-General of Angers, shortly after his appointment in January 1731 held a synod in which he re-enacted all the legislation of his predecessors. He was vigorously anti-Jansenist.

Bishop Guillaume-Laurent-Louis Angebault (1842–1869) held diocesan synods in Angers in 1859, on 24–26 September 1861, and in 1863.

A provincial council, presided over by Archbishop Jean Bernardi of Tours, was held in Angers from 1–17 August 1448. It issued a set of 17 canons, mostly concerned with clerical discipline. Bishop Jean de Beauvau of Angers (1447–1467) was not present.

=== Royal rights ===
In 1516, following the papal loss of the Battle of Marignano, Pope Leo X signed a concordat with King Francis I of France, removing the rights of all French entities which held the right to elect to a benefice, including bishoprics, canonicates, and abbeys, and granting the kings of France the right to nominate candidates to all these benefices, provided they be suitable persons, and subject to confirmation of the nomination by the pope. This removed the right of cathedral chapters to elect their bishop, or even to request the pope to name a bishop. The Concordat of Bologna was strongly protested by the University of Paris and by the Parliament of Paris. These benefices included all of the abbots and abbesses in the diocese of Angers.

=== Cathedral and churches ===
The earliest cathedral church in Angers is mentioned by Gregory of Tours. It burned in 473. A second church is associated with the name Dagobert or Pipin, which would seem to point to the 7th century. The second cathedral was in a ruinous state when Bishop Hubert de Vendôme (1006–1047), with the support of his parents, Vicount Hubert de Vendome and Emeline, rebuilt it; the third cathedral was dedicated on 16 August 1030. It had three naves, and two subsidiary naves. Less than two years later, on 27 September 1032, a major fire destroyed the city of Angers, including the cathedral, and, outside the walls, even destroyed most of the monastery of S. Aubin. The cathedral was rebuilt, though it did not get its stone vault until 1150. Bishop Ulger (1125–1148) built the façade. Between 1125 and 1170, most of the old windows were replaced with stained glass. The choir was built in the last quarter of the 12th century. The left transept belongs to the 2nd quarter of the 13th century. A hurricane brought down the north tower in 1192.

The Cathedral of S. Maurice was administered and served by a corporation called the Chapter. It consisted of 8 dignities (the Dean, the Grand Archdeacon, the Cantor, the Treasurer, the Archdeacon Transligeranus, the Archdeacon Transmeduanensis, the Scholasticus, and the Poenitentiarius) and 30 canons. The kings of France held by right the first of the canonicates. Among the canons were the abbot of S. Sergius and the abbot of Omnes Sancti. The Dean was elected by the Chapter, and confirmed by the archbishop of Tours. In 1334, Archbishop Stephen of Tours freed the Chapter from episcopal jurisdiction; in 1468, Pope Paul II did likewise.

In addition, there were seven collegiate churches inside the city of Angers, each served by a Chapter of canons: S. Jelianus, S. Laudus, S. Magnobodus, S. Martinus, S. Maurilius, S. Petrus, and Sanctissima Trinitas. There were twenty more collegiate churches elsewhere in the diocese.

In the Civil Constitution of the Clergy (1790), the National Constituent Assembly abolished cathedral chapters, canonicates, prebends, chapters and dignities of collegiate churches, chapters of both secular and regular clergy of both sexes, and abbeys and priories whether existing under a Rule or in commendam.

The cathedral of S. Mauritius was still under the control of the Catholic clergy until 20 March 1791, when it was taken over by the Constitutional clergy. The Constitutionals used the cathedral until 11 November 1793, when the Constitutional Church was abolished and the cathedral became the Temple of Reason. From 8 June 1794 until 4 August 1795, it was the Temple of the Supreme Being. The Constitutional Church was restored and used the cathedral until 28 April 1798, when it became the Temple décadaire, a name which was employed until 8 August 1800, until the name was again changed, to Temple consecré aux fêtes nationales. In April 1802, Catholicism reclaimed its cathedral.

=== Seminary ===
Struck by the low quality of the formation of the clergy over which he had come to rule, Bishop Henri Arnaud, in 1651, ordered that all aspirants to ordination to the priesthood must undertake a ten-day retreat, under the direction of the Oratorian fathers. In 1658, two Angevin priests proposed to Bishop Arnaud the establishment of a house of the Community of Saint-Nicolas-du-Chardonnet dedicated to the education of priests. In 1660, the bishop ordered that all clerics must spend three months in their community before being ordained subdeacons. In 1672, the seminary directors sought additional teachers in Paris, and obtained the services of two Sulpicians. The Sulpicians eventually became the faculty of the seminary. Joseph Grandet, a Sulpician, was appointed director in 1673, and in 1695 he negotiated the union of the seminary of Angers and the seminary of S. Sulpice

In the 18th century, there were two sorts of seminarians, those destined for ordination, who did not attend the university; and those who were only pensioners (numbering about 75).

During the French Revolution, in the struggle over the Civil Constitution of the Clergy, non-juring priests were arrested and imprisoned in the seminary building, since the seminary itself had been closed by order of the government.

=== University of Angers ===
The cathedral school of Angers had a long history through the Middle Ages, under the direction of the Scholasticus of the cathedral Chapter. In the first half of the 11th century, it attracted Master Sigo, a student of Fulbert of Chartres (died 1028), who became abbot of Saint-Florent of Saumurs (1055–70). It also claimed Master Hilduin, another of Fulbert's pupils, who became Prior of Saint-Aubin in Angers and then, in 1033, Abbot of Saint-Nicolas. Nothing is known of the subjects being taught in the 11th century. It is possible that the prohibition against the teaching of civil law at Paris by Pope Honorius III in 1219 stimulated its teaching at Angers, which is called a studium particulare. In any event, the secession of masters and students from the University of Paris very likely brought both teachers and students of both civil and canon law to Angers.

In 1244, a studium was founded at Angers for the teaching of canon and civil law. The Scholasticus of the cathedral school became the Grand Chancellor of the University. By the end of the 14th century, there were five officially recognized universities in France: Paris (1200), Toulouse (1229), Montpellier (1289), Orléans (1312), and Angers (1364). In 1432 Angers added faculties of theology, medicine and art. This university was divided into six "nations," and survived up to the time of the Revolution.

In consequence of the law of 1875 giving liberty in the matter of higher education, the University of Angers was returned to private hands, and became a Catholic institution.

=== French Revolution ===
Formed from the National Assembly on 9 July 1789 during the first stages of the French Revolution, the National Constituent Assembly ordered the replacement of political subdivisions of the ancien régime with subdivisions called "departments", to be characterized by a single administrative city in the center of a compact area. The decree was passed on 22 December 1789, the boundaries fixed on 26 February 1790, with the institution to be effective on 4 March 1790. The territory of Angers was assigned to the Departement de Maine-et-Loire, in the Metropole du Nord-Ouest. The National Constituent Assembly then, on 6 February 1790, instructed its ecclesiastical committee to prepare a plan for the reorganization of the clergy. At the end of May, its work was presented as a draft Civil Constitution of the Clergy, which, after vigorous debate, was approved on 12 July 1790. There was to be one diocese in each department, requiring the suppression of approximately fifty dioceses, and the massive redrawing of numerous diocesan boundaries.

In 1791, Bishop Couët du Viviers de Lorry refused to take the oath to the Civil Constitution, and fled to Rouen. He withdrew from all activity and lived in a small house in the countryside near Evreux. On 6 Febnruary 1791, the departmental electors met in the cathedral of S. Maurice and elected Hugues Pelletier, Prior-curé of Beaufort as their constitutional bishop.

On 29 November 1801, implementing the terms of the concordat of 1801 between the French Consulate, headed by First Consul Napoleon Bonaparte, and Pope Pius VII, the bishopric of Angers and all the other dioceses were suppressed. This removed all the contaminations and novelties introduced by the Constitutional Church. The pope then recreated the French ecclesiastical order, with the bull "Qui Christi Domini," respecting in most ways the changes introduced during the Revolution, including the reduction in the number of archdioceses and dioceses. Angers was restored as a suffragan diocese of the archdiocese of Tours.

=== Religious Orders ===
During the Middle Ages Angers was a flourishing city with six monasteries: the Abbey of Saint Aubin, founded by King Childebert I; the Abbey of St. Sergius by Clovis II; those of St. Julien, St. Nicholas and Ronceray, founded by Count Foulques Nerra, and All Saints' Abbey, an admirable structure of the twelfth century. In 1219 Pope Callixtus II went in person to Angers where, on 7 September 1119, he consecrated the church of S. Maria Caritatis attached to Ronceray Abbey. The Diocese of Angers includes Fontevrault, an abbey founded at the close of the eleventh century by Robert d'Arbrissel but which did not survive the Revolution. The ruins of St. Maur perpetuate the memory of the Benedictine abbey of that name. In all, the diocese once had 18 abbeys and 186 priories.

The Jesuits were introduced into the diocese of Angers by the desire of King Henri IV of France to establish a school (collège) in his palace at La Flèche, on the Loir River, 32 mi (52 km) north-east of Angers. He began the project in 1601, and the first Jesuits arrived at La Flèche on 2 January 1604. They were expelled from France in 1762, and the Society of Jesus was dissolved in 1773 by Pope Clement XIV. La Flèche became a military school, the Prytanée National Militaire.

In 1783, in the diocese of Angers, there were establishments of male religious communities: Augustinians, Capuchins, Carmelites, Francisscans, Dominicans, Brothers of the Christian Schools, Minims, Lazarists, Oratorians, Recollets d'Angers, Recollets de la Baumette, and Sulpicians.

The Brothers of the Christian Schools were established in Angers by Bishop Jean de Vaugirault (1731–1758) in 1741.

The Carmelite nuns were installed in Angers on 18 January 1626, by Bishop Charles Miron of Angers and Bishop Philippe Cospéan of Nantes. They were driven out in September 1792. The Ursulines were installed in Angers on 1 June 1618. They were expelled on 30 September 1792, and returned to Angers in 1818, though they did not receive royal permission until 30 July 1826. The Daughters of Charity were established at Angers by Louise de Marillac personally in December 1639.

During the French Revolution, the National Constituent Assembly attacked the institution of monasticism. On 13 February 1790, it issued a decree which stated that the government would no longer recognize solemn religious vows taken by either men or women. In consequence, Orders and Congregations which lived under a Rule were suppressed in France. Members of either sex were free to leave their monasteries or convents if they wished, and could claim an appropriate pension by applying to the local municipal authority.

==== Religious Orders after 1800 ====
The Congregation of the Good Shepherd (Soeurs de Nôtre-Dame du Bon Pasteur d'Angers), which has houses in all parts of the world, has its mother-house at Angers, by virtue of the papal brief "Cum christianae" of Pope Gregory XVI of 3 April 1835. In 1839, Bishop Charles Montault (1802–1839) recalled the Jesuits to Angers. The Carmelite nuns returned in December 1850. Bishop Guillaume Angebault (1842–1869) invited the Capuchins to return in 1858; and in 1860 the Lazarists and the Oblates of Mary. In 1862, the Pères du Saint-Sacrement were restored.

== Bishops ==
=== To 1000 ===
- Defensor (attested 372)
- Apotemius (Epetemius) (attested 396)
- Maurilius (c.423-453)
- Thalassius (attested 453–462)
- Eustochius (attested 511)
- Adelfius
- Albinus of Angers (attested 538–549)
- Eutropius (attested 551)
- Domitianus (attested 557–568)
- Audoveus (attested 581)
- Licinius (attested 601)
- Magnobodus (610–660)
- Aiglibertus (attested 683)

...

- Mauriolus (attested 760–772)

...

- Benedictus (attested 816)
- Flodegarius (attested 829)

...

- Dodo (attested 837–880)
- Raino (880–after 905)
- Rothard (910 ?)
- Rainaldus (920)
- Hervaeus (attested 929)
- Aimo (943–966)?
- Nefingus (966–973)
- Rainaldus (973–1005)

=== 1000 to 1300 ===
- Hubert de Vendôme (1006–1047)
- Eusebius Bruno (1047–1081)
- Gottfried of Tours (1081–1093)
- Gottfried of Mayenne (1093–1101)
- Renaud de Martigné (1102–1125)
- Ulger (1125–1148)
- Normand de Doué (1148–1153)
- Mathieu de Loudun (1156–1162)
- Geoffroy La Mouche (1162–1177)
- Raoul de Beaumont (1177–1197)
- Guillaume de Chemillé (1197–1202)
- Guillaume de Beaumont (1203–1240)
- Michel Villoiseau (1240–1260)
- Nicolas Gellant (1260–1291)
- Guillaume Le Maire (1291–1314)

=== 1300 to 1500 ===
- Hugues Odard (1317–1323)
- Foulques de Mathefelon (1324–1355)
- Raoul de Machecoul (1356–1358)
- Guillaume Turpin de Cressé (1358–1371)
- Milon de Dormans (1371–1373)
- Hardouin de Bueil (1374–1439)

Guillaume d'Estouteville (1439)

- Jean Michel (1439–1447)
- Jean de Beauvau (1447–1467)
- Jean Balue (1467–1476)

Jean de Beauvau (1476–1479) (administrator)
Auger de Brie (1479–1480) (administrator)

- Jean Balue (1480–1491)
- Carlo Carretto (1491–1492) Administrator
- Jean de Rely (1492–1499)

- Richard de Boys (1492–1506), Coadjutor

=== 1500 to 1800 ===
- François de Rohan (1499–1532) Administrator

- Olivier Le Presteur (1506–1550?) Coadjutor
- Jean Lambert (1518– ? ) Coadjutor
- Jean Censier (1519– ? ) Coadjutor

- Jean Olivier (1532–1540)

- Mathurin Legay (1538–1542) Coadjutor

- Gabriel Bouvery (1540–1572)

- Guy Grégoire, O.Cist. (1542–1558) Coadjutor
- Pierre de Ragane (1560–1595?) Coadjutor

- Guillaume Ruzé (1572–1587)
- Charles Miron (1588–1616)
- Guillaume Fouquet de la Varenne (1616–1621)
- Charles Miron (1622–1627)
- Claude de Rueil (1628–1649)
- Henri Arnauld (1650–1692)
- Michel Le Peletier (1692–1706)
- Michel Poncet de la Rivière (1706–1730)
- Jean de Vaugirault (1731–1758)
- Jacques de Grasse (1758–1782)
- Michel-François Couët du Viviers de Lorry (1782–1802)

Constitutional Church (schismatic)

- Hugues Pelletier (1791–1793)

=== From 1800 ===
- Charles Montault des Isles (1802–1839)
- Louis-Robert Paysant (1839–1841)
- Guillaume-Laurent-Louis Angebault (1842–1869)
- Charles-Emile Freppel (1869–1891)
- François-Désiré Mathieu (1893–1896)
- Louis-Jules Baron (1896–1898)
- Joseph Rumeau (1898–1940)
- Jean-Camille Costes (1940–1950)
- Henri-Alexandre Chappoulie (1950–1959)
- Pierre Veuillot (1959–1961)
- Henri-Louis-Marie Mazerat (1961–1974)
- Jean Pierre Marie Orchampt (1974–2000)
- Jean-Louis Bruguès, O.P. (2000–2007)
- Emmanuel Delmas (since 2008) (fr)

== See also ==
- Catholic Church in France
- List of Catholic dioceses in France

== Bibliography ==
=== Reference works ===
- Gams, Pius Bonifatius (1873). Series episcoporum Ecclesiae catholicae: quotquot innotuerunt a beato Petro apostolo. Ratisbon: Typis et Sumptibus Georgii Josephi Manz. pp. 488–490. (Use with caution; obsolete)
- Eubel, Conradus, ed. (1913). Hierarchia catholica (in Latin). Vol. 1 (second ed.). Münster: Libreria Regensbergiana.
- Eubel, Conradus, ed. (1914). Hierarchia catholica (in Latin). Vol. 2 (second ed.). Münster: Libreria Regensbergiana.
- Gulik, Guilelmus (1923). Eubel, Conradus (ed.). Hierarchia catholica (in Latin). Vol. 3 (second ed.). Münster: Libreria Regensbergiana.
- Gauchat, Patritius (Patrice) (1935). Hierarchia catholica (in Latin). Vol. 4 (1592-1667). Münster: Libraria Regensbergiana.
- Ritzler, Remigius; Sefrin, Pirminus (1952). Hierarchia catholica medii et recentis aevi (in Latin). Vol. 5 (1667-1730). Patavii: Messagero di S. Antonio.
- Ritzler, Remigius; Sefrin, Pirminus (1958). Hierarchia catholica medii et recentis aevi (in Latin). Vol. 6 (Tomus VI) (1730–1799). Patavii: Messagero di S. Antonio.
- Ritzler, Remigius; Sefrin, Pirminus (1968). Hierarchia Catholica medii et recentioris aevi (in Latin). Vol. VII (1800–1846). Monasterii: Libreria Regensburgiana.
- Remigius Ritzler; Pirminus Sefrin (1978). Hierarchia catholica Medii et recentioris aevi (in Latin). Vol. VIII (1846–1903). Il Messaggero di S. Antonio.
- Pięta, Zenon (2002). Hierarchia catholica medii et recentioris aevi (in Latin). Vol. IX (1903–1922). Padua: Messagero di San Antonio. ISBN 978-88-250-1000-8.

=== Studies ===
- Besse, J.-M. (1920). "Diocese d'Angers," in: Dom Beaunier (ed.), Abbayes et prieures de l'ancienne France: recueil historique des archevêchés, évêchés, abbayes et prieurés de France, (in French), Volume 8 (Paris: A. Picard, 1920), pp. 57-126.
- Bourgain, Louis (1898). L'église d'Angers pendant la révolution et jusqu'en 1870: conférences faites aux facultés catholiques d'Angers (in French). Paris: Germain & Grassin, 1898.
- Chadwick, Nora Kershaw (1969). Early Brittany. Cardiff: University of Wales Press. ISBN 9780900768262.
- Duchesne, Louis Fastes épiscopaux de l'ancienne Gaule: Vol. II: L'Aquitaine et les Lyonnaises. (in French). deuxième edition. Paris: Thorin & fils, 1899. pp. 343–356. Internet Archive
- Farcy, Louis de; Pinier, P. (1903). Le Palais épiscopal d'Angers: Histoire et description. (in French). Angers: Germain et Grassin, 1903.
- Hauréau, Barthélemy (1856). Gallia Christiana: In Provincias Ecclesiasticas Distributa... De provincia Turonensi (in Latin). Vol. Tomus Quartus decimus (XIV). Paris: Typographia Regia. pp. 542–586, "Instrumenta" pp. 143–162.
- Du Tems, Hugues (1774). Le clergé de France, ou tableau historique et chronologique des archevêques, évêques, abbés, abbesses et chefs des chapitres principaux du royaume, depuis la fondation des églises jusqu'à nos jours (in French). Vol. Tome premier. Paris: Delalain.
- Jean, Armand (1891). Les évêques et les archevêques de France depuis 1682 jusqu'à 1801 (in French). Paris: A. Picard.
- Letourneau, Georges (1895). Histoire du séminaire d'Angers: Depuis son union avec Saint-Sulpice en 1695 jusqu'a nos jours. (in French). Angers: Germain & G. Grassin, 1895.
- Matz, Jean-Michel – Comte, François (ed.) (2003): Fasti Ecclesiae Gallicanae. Répertoire prosopographique des évêques, dignitaires et chanoines des diocèses de France de 1200 à 1500. VII. Diocèse d’Angers. Turnhout, Brepols. (in French)
- Pisani, Paul (1907). Répertoire biographique de l'épiscopat constitutionnel (1791-1802) (in French). Paris: A. Picard et fils.
- Rangeard, Pierre (1872). ed. Albert Jean Baptiste Lemarchand. Histoire de l'université d'Angers, (in French and Latin), Volume 1 (Angers: E Barassé, 1872).
- Tresvaux du Fraval, François Marie (1858), Histoire de l‛Église et du Diocèse d‛Angers. (in French). Volume 1. Volume 2. Paris: Jacques Lecoffre et Cie., Cosnier et Lachèse, 1858.
- Uzureau, François Constant (1904). Pouillé du diocèse d'Angers. (in French). Angers: Lachèse & cie, 1904 [reprint of ed. of 1783].
- Uzureau, François Constant (1919). Andegaviana. Volume 21. Volume 22. (index p. 411). Angers: 1919.
