= Eusebius of Angers =

Bishop of Angers (died 1081)

Eusebius (Bruno) of Angers (died September 1, 1081) was bishop of Angers, France.

He first appears in the historical record as bishop of Angers at the synod of Rheims in 1049, and for a long time had been an adherent of Berengar's doctrine of the Lord's Supper. As such he was highly regarded by Berengar himself and by his opponents Theodwin of Liège, Durand of Troarne, and Humbert of Mourmoutiers. But when he recognized the strength of the opposition, he favored a compromise; at any rate he advised Berengar is 1054 to swear to the formula presented to him.

Nevertheless, Berengar considered him his friend many years later and requested him to silence a certain Galfrid Martini or to arrange a disputation. In his reply Eusebius not only regretted the whole controversy, but also stated that he would abide by the words of the Bible, according to which the bread and wine after the consecration become the body and blood of the Lord (see transubstantiation); if one asks how this can take place, the answer must be that it is not according to the order of nature but in accordance with the divine omnipotence; at any rate one must be careful not to give offense to the plain Christian. The epistle is a downright renunciation of Berengar in case he should still maintain his view.

In favor of the supposition that Eusebius changed his opinion from deference to the Count of Anjou, the decided opponent of Berengar and his doctrine, it can be adduced that he did not defend Berengar against the hostilities of the court, and that for a long time he sided with this violent prince. It is also possible that the fact impressed itself upon Eusebius that the religious consciousness of the time more and more opposed Berengar. Our knowledge, however, is too fragmentary to pass a very accurate sentence.
