= Berengar of Tours =

French Catholic theologian (999–1088)

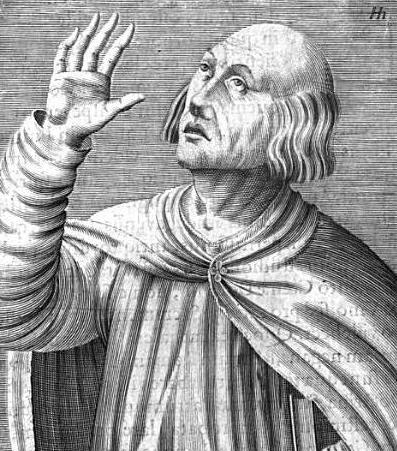
Berengar of Tours, engraving by Henrik Hondius from Jacob Verheiden, Praestantium aliquot theologorum (1602)

Berengar of Tours (died 6 January 1088) was an 11th-century French Catholic theologian and archdeacon of Angers. His leadership of the School of Chartres set an example of intellectual inquiry through the revived tools of dialectic that was soon followed at cathedral schools of Laon and Paris. Berengar was distinguished from mainline Catholic theology by two views: his assertion of the supremacy of Scripture and his denial of transubstantiation. According to Thomas Aquinas, "Berengarius ... withdrew his error and acknowledged the truth of the faith."

== Biography ==
Berengar of Tours was born perhaps at Tours, probably in the early years of the 11th century. His education began in the school of Bishop Fulbert of Chartres, who represented the traditional theology of the early Middle Ages, but did not succeed in imparting it to his pupil. Berengar was less attracted by pure theology than by secular learning, and brought away a knowledge of Latin literature, dialectic, and general knowledge and freedom of thought. Later he paid more attention to the Bible and early Christian writers, especially Gregory of Tours and Augustine of Hippo; and thus he came to formal theology.

After the death of Fulbert in 1028, Berengar returned to Tours, where he became a canon of the cathedral. In about 1040 he became head of its school, improving its efficiency and attracting students from far and near. He acquired his fame as much from his blameless and ascetic life as from the success of his teaching. His reputation was such that a number of monks requested him to write a book to kindle their zeal; and his letter to Joscelin, later archbishop of Bordeaux, who had asked him to decide a dispute between Bishop Isembert of Poitiers and his chapter, is evidence of the authority attributed to his judgment. He became archdeacon of Angers, but remained in Tours to direct the school. He enjoyed the confidence of not a few bishops and of the powerful Count Geoffrey of Anjou.

Amid this chorus of praise, a discordant voice began to be heard; it was asserted that Berengar held heretical views on the Eucharist. The first controversies on the nature of the Eucharistic Presence date from the earlier Middle Ages. In the ninth century Paschasius Radbertus claimed that Christ's Eucharistic body was identical with his body in heaven, but he won practically no support. His doctrine was sharply attacked by Ratramnus and Rabanus Maurus, who opposed his emphatic realism, which was sometimes marred by unfortunate comparisons and illustrations, and proposed a more spiritual conception of the Divine Presence. As for Berengar, by one account, "Considerably greater stir was provoked ... by the teaching of Berengar, who opposed the doctrine of the Real Presence." But in reality, there are diverse opinions among theologians and historians on this point, and it is not clear that Berengar actually denies the Real Presence, though he does deny transubstantiation. The first to take formal notice of this was his former fellow student Adelmann, who begged him to abandon his opposition to the Church's teaching.

Probably in the early part of 1050, Berengar addressed a letter to Lanfranc, then prior of Bec Abbey in Normandy, in which he expressed his regret that Lanfranc adhered to the Eucharistic teaching of Paschasius and considered the treatise of Ratramnus on the subject (which Berengar supposed to have been written by Johannes Scotus Eriugena) to be heretical. He declared his own agreement with Eriugena, and believed himself to be supported by Saint Ambrose, Saint Jerome, Augustine, and other authorities. This letter was received by Lanfranc in Rome, where it was read before a council and Berengar's view was condemned. Berengar was summoned to appear at another council to be held at Vercelli in September. Berengar sought permission to go to the council from King Henry I of France, in his capacity as nominal abbot of St. Martin at Tours. Instead, for unclear reasons, the king imprisoned him. The council at Vercelli examined Berengar's doctrine and again condemned it and he was excommunicated.

On his release from prison, probably affected by the influence of Geoffrey of Anjou, the king still pursued him, and called a synod to meet in Paris in October 1051. Berengar, fearing its purpose, avoided appearing, and the king's threats after its session had no effect, since Berengar was sheltered by Geoffrey and by his former student, Eusebius, now Bishop of Angers. He also found numerous partisans among less prominent people.

In 1054, a Council was held at Tours presided over by Cardinal Hildebrand as papal legate. Berengar wrote a profession of faith wherein he confessed that after the consecration the bread and wine were truly the body and blood of Christ. The French bishops indicated that they wished a speedy settlement of the controversy and the synod declared itself satisfied by Berengar's written declaration.

In 1059, Berengar went to Rome, fortified by a letter of commendation from Count Geoffrey to Hildebrand. At a council held in the Lateran, he could get no hearing, and a formula representing what seemed to him the most carnal view of the sacrament was offered for his acceptance. Overwhelmed by the forces against him, he took this document in his hand and threw himself on the ground in the silence of apparent submission.

Berengar returned to France full of remorse for this desertion of his faith and of bitterness against the pope and his opponents; his friends were growing fewer—Geoffrey was dead and his successor hostile. Eusebius Bruno was gradually withdrawing from him. Rome, however, was disposed to give him a chance; Pope Alexander II wrote him an encouraging letter, at the same time warning him to give no further offence.

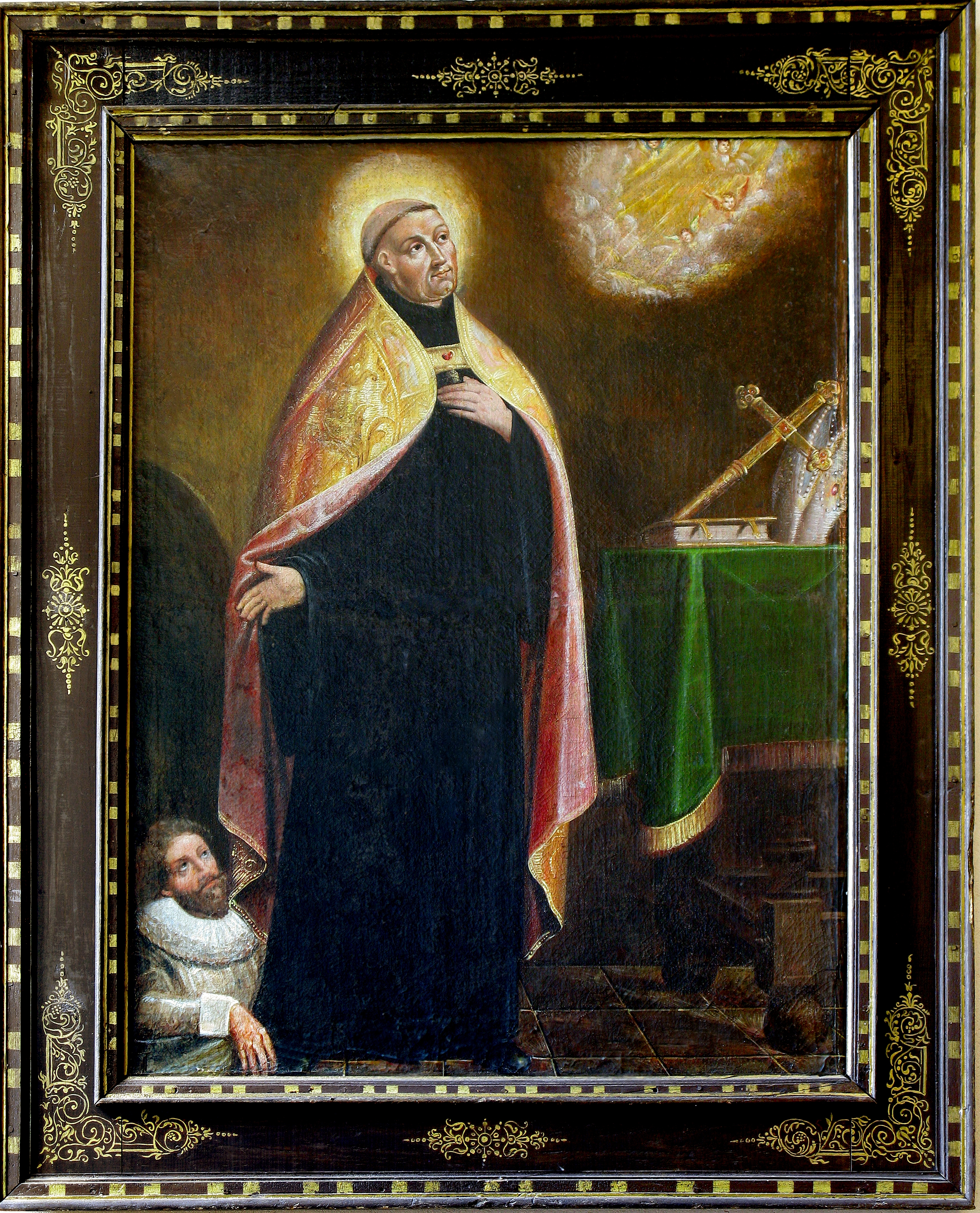
18th-century artwork of Lanfranc enjoying the favour of God, while Berengar (lower left) is humiliated

He was still firm in his convictions, and in about 1069 he published a treatise in which he gave vent to his resentment against Pope Nicholas II and his antagonists in the Roman council. Lanfranc answered it, and Berengar rejoined. Bishop Hugo of Langres also wrote a treatise, De corpore et sanguine Christi, against Berengar. Even his namesake Berengar, Bishop of Venosa, was drawn into the quarrel and wrote against him at Rome in the years of his second summons there.

But the feeling against him in France was growing so hostile that it almost came to open violence at the Synod of Poitiers in 1076. Hildebrand, now Pope Gregory VII, tried yet to save him; he summoned him once more to Rome (1078), and undertook to silence his enemies by getting him to assent to a vague formula, something like the one which he had signed at Tours. But Berengar's enemies were not satisfied, and three months later at another synod they forced on him a formula which could mean nothing but what was later called transubstantiation, except by utterly indefensible sophistry. He was indiscreet enough to claim the sympathy of Gregory VII, who commanded him to acknowledge his errors and pursue them no further. Berengar confessed that he had erred, and was sent home.

Once back in France, he published his own account of the proceedings in Rome, retracting his recantation. The consequence was another trial before a synod at Bordeaux (1080), and another recantation.

After this he kept silence, retiring to the island of Saint-Cosme near Tours to live in ascetic solitude. It was there that he died, in union with the Catholic Church. According to Thomas Aquinas, "Berengarius ... withdrew his error and acknowledged the truth of the faith."

=== Selection from his 1059 confession ===
"...the bread and wine which are placed on the altar are after consecration not only a sacrament but also the true body and blood of our Lord Jesus Christ, and with the senses not only sacramentally but in truth are taken and broken by the hands of the priests and crushed by the teeth of the faithful."

=== Text of his 1079 confession ===
"I, Berengarius, believe in my heart and openly profess that the bread and wine that are placed on the altar are through the mystery of the sacred prayer and the words of our Redeemer substantially changed into the true and proper life-giving flesh and blood of Jesus Christ our Lord; and that after the consecration is the true body of Christ, which was born of the Virgin, as an offering for the salvation of the world hung on the cross, and sits at the right hand of the Father; and (is) the true blood of Christ which flowed from his side; not only through the sign and power of the sacrament but in his proper nature and true substance; as it is set down in this summary and as I read it and you understand it. Thus I believe, and I will not teach any more against this faith. So help me God and this holy Gospel of God."

== Berengar's theory of the Eucharist ==
Berengar's theory of the Eucharist had four points:

1. The elements [bread and wine] remain in substance as well as in appearance, after the consecration, although they acquire a new significance.
2. However the wine and bread are not mere symbols, but in some sense, they still are the body and blood of Jesus which they represent.
3. Christ is spiritually present and is spiritually received by faith.
4. The communion in the Eucharist is a communion with the whole undivided person of Jesus Christ, and not the blood and body of Jesus as separate elements. As the whole body of Christ was sacrificed in death, it is received in a spiritual manner as the whole body; and as Christ’s body is now glorified in heaven, we must spiritually ascend to heaven.

The views of Berengar on the Eucharist had very much in common with the views of John Calvin.

== Significance ==
Berengar of Tours can be seen as a forerunner of Christian rationalism, as he criticized Church authority.

Berengar's position was never diametrically opposed to that of his critics. But the controversy that he aroused forced people to reconsider the ninth-century discussion of the Eucharist, as Paschasius Radbertus had left it, and to clarify the doctrine of transubstantiation. Further, when both Berengar and his critics used the secular disciplines of logic and grammar to express a matter of Christian doctrine, the way was open to the scholasticism of the twelfth century.

Berengar of Tours was a forerunner of the Reformers, especially of Zwingli and John Calvin.

== See also ==
- Berengarians, followers of Berengar
- Eucharist in the Catholic Church
