= Angers =

- Prefecture and commune
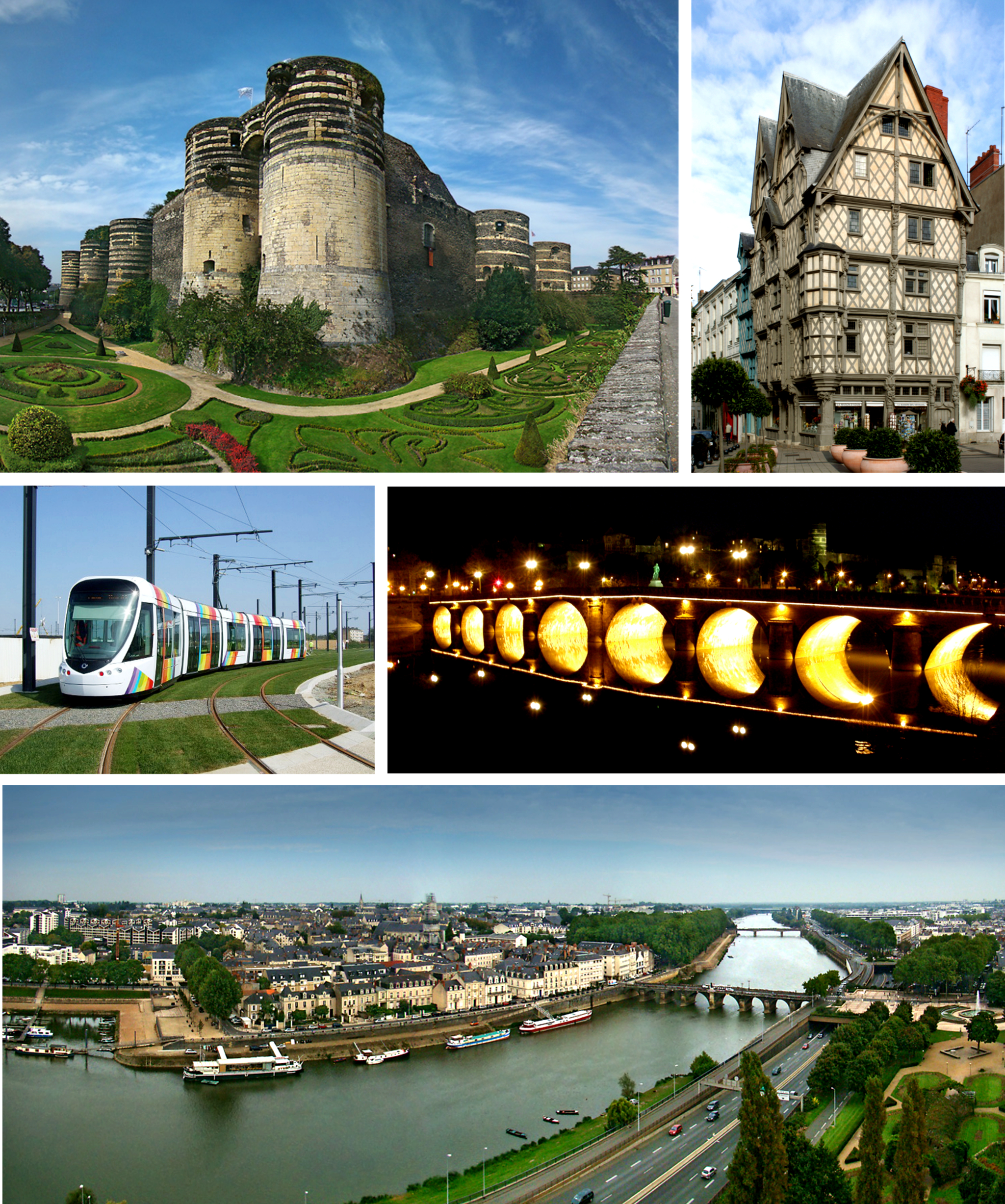
- Top to bottom, left to right: Château d'Angers, Maison d'Adam; Angers tram, Verdun Bridge at night; view of the river Maine, Verdun Bridge and downtown area from Angers Castle

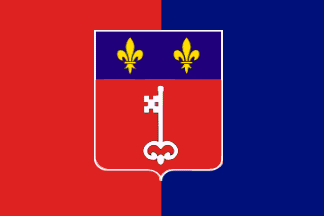
- Flag Coat of arms

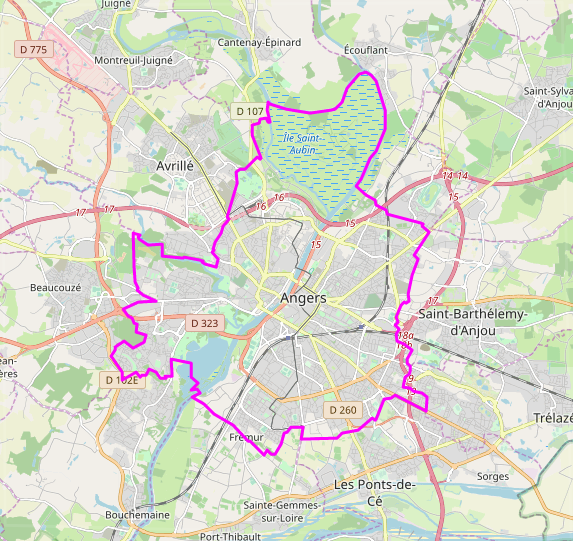
- Location of Angers
- Location within France Location within Pays de la Loire
- Coordinates: 47°28′16″N 0°33′7″W
- Country: France
- Region: Pays de la Loire
- Department: Maine-et-Loire
- Arrondissement: Angers
- Canton: Angers-1, 2, 3, 4, 5, 6, 7
- Intercommunality: CU Angers Loire Métropole

Government
  - Mayor (2026–32): Christophe Béchu
- Area^{1}: 42.70 km^{2} (16.49 sq mi)
  - Urban: 243.3 km^{2} (93.9 sq mi)
  - Metro: 2,418.7 km^{2} (933.9 sq mi)
- Highest elevation: 64 m (210 ft)
- Lowest elevation: 12 m (39 ft)
- Population (2023): 159,022
  - Rank: 18th in France
  - Density: 3,724/km^{2} (9,646/sq mi)
  - Urban (2022): 250,031
  - Urban density: 1,028/km^{2} (2,662/sq mi)
  - Metro (2022): 443,887
  - Metro density: 183.52/km^{2} (475.32/sq mi)
- Demonym(s): Angevin (masculine); Angevine (feminine)
- Time zone: UTC+01:00 (CET)
  - Summer (DST): UTC+02:00 (CEST)
- INSEE/Postal code: 49007 /49000, 49100
- ^{1} French Land Register data, which excludes lakes, ponds, glaciers > 1 km^{2} (0.386 sq mi or 247 acres) and river estuaries.

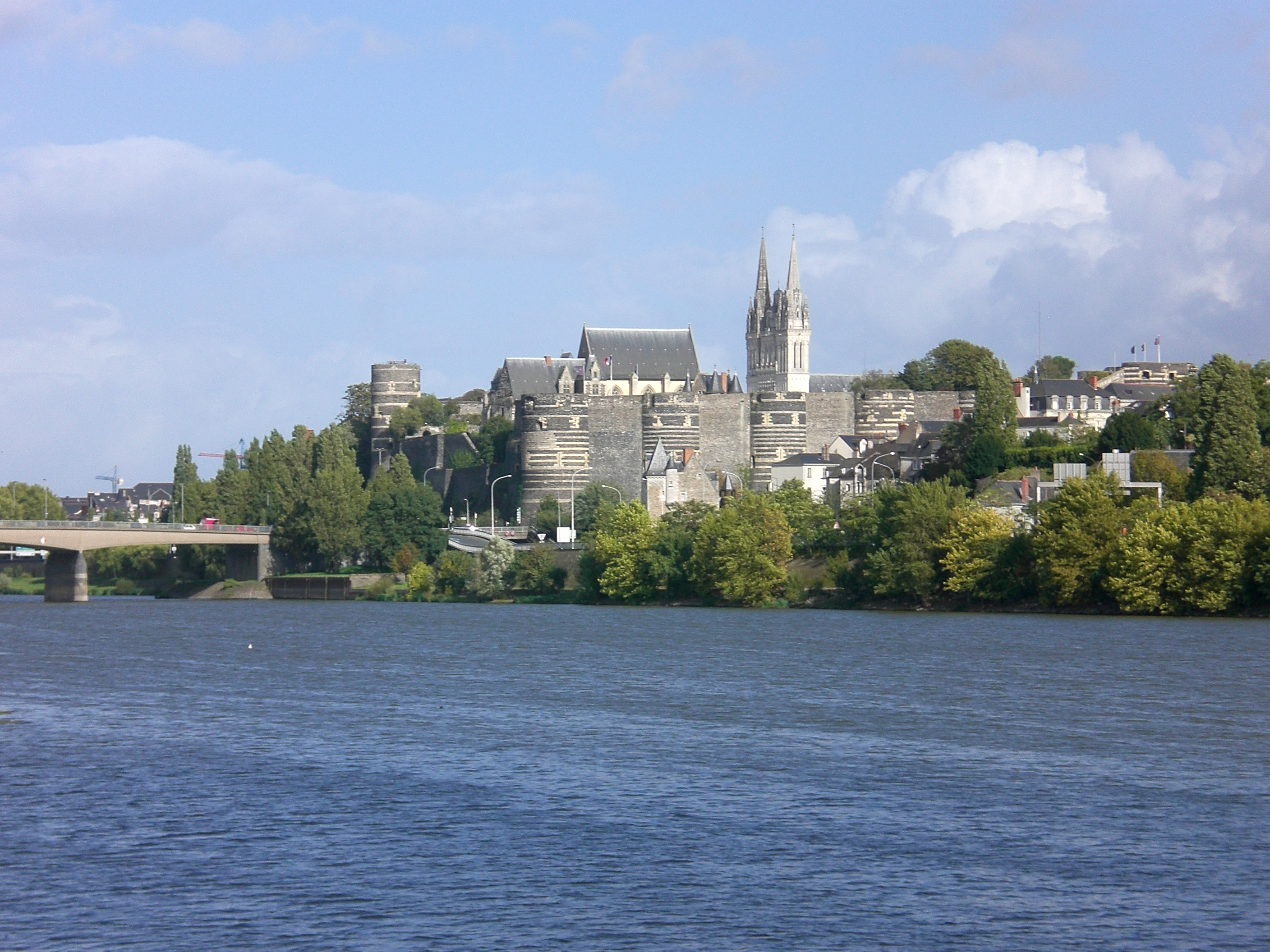
The Maine, the castle, and the spires of the cathedral

Angers (UK: /ˈɒ̃ʒeɪ/, US: /ɒ̃ˈʒeɪ, ˈændʒərz/; French: [ɑ̃ʒe]) is a city in western France, about 300 km (190 mi) southwest of Paris. It is the prefecture of the Maine-et-Loire department and was the capital of the province of Anjou until the French Revolution. The inhabitants of both the city and the province are called Angevins or, more rarely, Angeriens.

Angers proper covers 42.70 square kilometres (16.49 sq mi) and has a population of 157,555 inhabitants, while around 443,900 live in its metropolitan area (aire d'attraction). The Angers Loire Métropole is made up of 29 communes covering 667 square kilometres (258 sq mi) with 308,800 inhabitants (2022). Not including the broader metropolitan area, Angers is the third most populous commune in northwestern France after Nantes and Rennes and the 18th most populous commune in France.

For centuries, Angers was an important stronghold in northwestern France. It was the cradle of the Plantagenet dynasty and became one of the intellectual centers of Europe during the reign of René of Anjou. Angers developed at the confluence of three rivers, the Mayenne, the Sarthe, and the Loir, all coming from the north and flowing south towards the Loire. Their confluence, just north of Angers, creates the Maine, a short but wide river that flows into the Loire several kilometres south.

Today, Angers stands out for its specialization in the plant sector: Végépolys is Europe's leading horticultural competitiveness cluster, and the city is also home to the headquarters of the Community Plant Variety Office. In addition, the Angers metropolitan area is a major economic centre in western France, particularly active in industry and tourism. Angers enjoys a rich cultural life, made possible by its universities and museums. The old medieval center is still dominated by the massive château of the Plantagenêts, home of the Apocalypse Tapestry, the biggest medieval tapestry ensemble in the world. Angers is also both at the edge of the Val de Loire, a World Heritage Site, and the Loire-Anjou-Touraine regional natural park.

== Toponymy ==
=== Etymology ===
The city is first mentioned by Ptolemy around AD 150 in his Geography. It was then known as Juliomagus (Ancient Greek: Ἰουλιόμαγος, Iouliómagos), a name by which it also appears in the Tabula Peutingeriana. The name is a compound of the Latin name Julius (probably in reference to Julius Caesar) and the Celtic magos, "market". Similar town dedications were common in Roman Gaul, and toponyms often kept a Gallic element.

When the location needed to be distinguished from other Juliomagi, it was known as Juliomagus Andecavorum ("Juliomagus of the Andecavi"), in reference to the principal Gallic tribe in and around the city.

Around AD 400, the city came to be referred to as the civitas Andecavorum ("tribal capital of the Andecavi"). This was a common change in Gaul, also seen in the names of Paris, Tours and Évreux around this time. During the Middle Ages, the late Latin name gradually developed into the modern one. It is successively mentioned as Andecava civitas (6th century), Andecavis (AD 769), Andegavis (861 – 882), Angieus (in 1127) and Angeus (in 1205). The form Angiers appeared during the 12th century and was later corrupted to "Angers".

The Latin Andecavum also gave Anjou its name. This double formation is also quite common in France and can be seen in Poitiers and Poitou, and Bourges and Berry.

=== Nicknames ===
Angers was traditionally known as the "Black City" (la Ville Noire) because many roofs were built of slate, due to the quarry in neighbouring Trélazé. These have become less common since the development of the city in the 19th century. The city has also been known as:

- "The Athens of the West" (Athènes de l'Ouest), a name borne since the 19th century from the development of its university
- "The City of Flowers" (Ville des fleurs), a name from the Second Empire
- "Green City" (Ville verte), in reference to its numerous parks and important horticultural industry
- "Angers the White" (Angers la Blanche), from its modern tufa façades and with ironic reference to its former name

=== Heraldry ===
Coat of arms of Angers

Coat of arms under Napoleon's rule

The coat of arms of Angers bears the French royal fleur de lys of the dukes of Anjou (the first duke was the son of the king of France, Jean II); the key evokes the stronghold position of the city close to the Breton border. An acrostic from the Middle Ages calls it Antique clef de France, which means "Ancient key to France":

- Antique clef de France, (antique key to France)
- Neteté de souffrance, (sharpness of displeasure)
- Garant contre ennemis, (protection against enemies)
- Etappe d'assurance, (step of assurance)
- Recours de secourance, (help of relief)
- Securité d'amis. (security for friends)

Under Napoleon I's rule, Angers was one of the "Bonnes villes"(fr) and was therefore allowed to ask for a new coat of arms. The bees, symbol of the First French Empire, then replaced the royal fleurs de lys.

In 1949, Angers received the 1939–1945 War Cross and since then, the decoration is sometimes placed between the two fleurs de lys.

Angers also had several mottos through its history:

- During Antiquity: Assiuis conciliis (or consiliis);
- From 1434 to 1480 (reign of René of Anjou): D'ardent désir;
- In 1499: Antique clef de France;
- Until June 1987: Angers, la qualité.

== Geography ==
=== Location ===
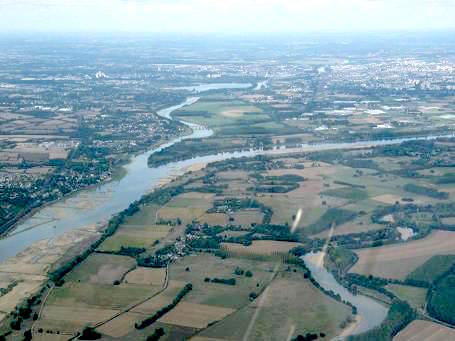
The confluence of the Maine and the Loire some 4 miles (6.4 km) south west of Angers

Angers is located at the geographical center of the Maine-et-Loire department, on the road (A11 autoroute, L'Océane) which connects Paris to the Atlantic Ocean. The city is situated just south of the confluence of the Loir, Mayenne and Sarthe, which form together the river Maine. The Maine crosses Angers and heads south towards the Loire. The confluence of the three rivers and the proximity of the Loire make up a natural crossroads which favoured the foundation of the antique Juliomagus.

Angers is located 91 km (57 mi) from Nantes, 124 km (77 mi) from Rennes, 132 km (82 mi) from Poitiers and 297 km (185 mi) from Paris. It is also 118 km (73 mi) far from Pornic, the closest sea resort, situated on the Atlantic Ocean.

Elevation varies 12 to 64 meters (39 to 210 ft) above sea level.

Angers is a hilly town, particularly marked by a rocky promontory dominating the lower valley of Anjou. This was the site of the ancient city and still houses the town's castle, cathedral, and medieval quarters.

At the north and south, where the river Maine arrives in and leaves Angers, the landscape is formed by islands, ponds and floodplains which are a haven for birds and a typical flora of the Val de Loire. The étang Saint-Nicolas and Lac de Maine (fr) both artificial, are among the biggest green areas of the city.

=== Metropolitan area ===
The commune of Angers is bordered by ten other communes which form various suburbs. These are, clockwise, Avrillé, Cantenay-Épinard, Écouflant, Saint-Barthélemy-d'Anjou, Trélazé, Les Ponts-de-Cé, Sainte-Gemmes-sur-Loire, Bouchemaine and Beaucouzé. 22 other communes situated farther form with them the Communauté urbaine Angers Loire Métropole. All these peripheral communes are situated within 17 km (11 mi) from Angers proper. Together, they have around 272,400 inhabitants.

=== Climate ===
Angers has an oceanic climate, with moderate rain year-round. Winters have scarce frosts and snowfalls, and summers are warm and sunny.

Climate data for Angers (located in Beaucouzé, 1991–2020 normals)
Month	Jan	Feb	Mar	Apr	May	Jun	Jul	Aug	Sep	Oct	Nov	Dec	Year
Record high °C (°F)	17.1 (62.8)	21.2 (70.2)	24.8 (76.6)	29.7 (85.5)	32.8 (91.0)	41.0 (105.8)	40.7 (105.3)	38.7 (101.7)	35.7 (96.3)	30.5 (86.9)	22.2 (72.0)	19.0 (66.2)	40.7 (105.3)
Mean daily maximum °C (°F)	8.8 (47.8)	9.9 (49.8)	13.3 (55.9)	16.4 (61.5)	19.9 (67.8)	23.5 (74.3)	25.8 (78.4)	25.9 (78.6)	22.4 (72.3)	17.4 (63.3)	12.3 (54.1)	9.2 (48.6)	17.1 (62.8)
Daily mean °C (°F)	6.0 (42.8)	6.4 (43.5)	9.0 (48.2)	11.3 (52.3)	14.7 (58.5)	18.1 (64.6)	20.0 (68.0)	20.1 (68.2)	16.9 (62.4)	13.4 (56.1)	9.1 (48.4)	6.3 (43.3)	12.6 (54.7)
Mean daily minimum °C (°F)	3.3 (37.9)	2.9 (37.2)	4.6 (40.3)	6.3 (43.3)	9.6 (49.3)	12.6 (54.7)	14.3 (57.7)	14.3 (57.7)	11.4 (52.5)	9.3 (48.7)	5.9 (42.6)	3.5 (38.3)	8.2 (46.8)
Record low °C (°F)	−15.4 (4.3)	−12.8 (9.0)	−10.6 (12.9)	−3.4 (25.9)	−1.6 (29.1)	2.3 (36.1)	4.5 (40.1)	5.1 (41.2)	2.5 (36.5)	−3.2 (26.2)	−8.0 (17.6)	−13.4 (7.9)	−15.4 (4.3)
Average precipitation mm (inches)	69.9 (2.75)	54.4 (2.14)	52.8 (2.08)	54.7 (2.15)	59.4 (2.34)	48.7 (1.92)	45.0 (1.77)	48.2 (1.90)	56.5 (2.22)	71.9 (2.83)	72.9 (2.87)	74.9 (2.95)	709.3 (27.93)
Average precipitation days	11.4	9.5	9.4	9.7	9.2	6.8	6.1	7.1	7.6	10.6	11.9	11.7	110.9
Average snowy days	1.7	1.9	1.4	0.2	0.1	0.0	0.0	0.0	0.0	0.0	0.4	1.3	7.0
Average relative humidity (%)	88	84	80	77	77	75	74	76	80	86	89	89	81.3
Mean monthly sunshine hours	68.4	97.7	142.3	179.6	205.0	224.2	235.3	225.3	191.7	120.9	84.1	70.8	1,845.1
Source 1: Meteo France
Source 2: Infoclimat.fr (humidity, snowy days 1961–1990)

=== Urban morphology ===
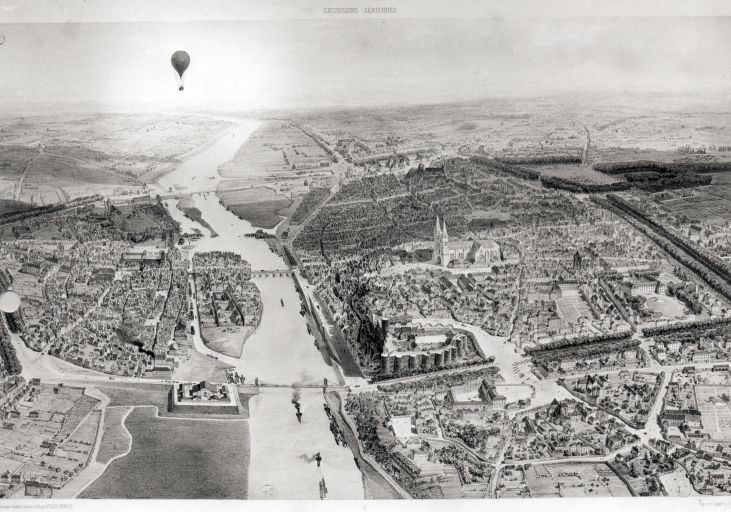
Angers around 1850, with the river Maine at the middle, the castle and the medieval town on the right bank and La Doutre and its river port on the left bank

The oldest streets and buildings in Angers are located on the promontory where the Angers castle stands. The urban structure there dates back from the 13th, 14th and 15th centuries.

A military presence there was attested from the 3rd century and some remains of an antique city wall are still visible on the castle grounds. This wall was built to protect the city from the Germanic invasions of AD 275 and 276.

During the Middle Ages, the castle was the core of the city's defence system, composed of tall city walls and river chains which prevented enemy ships from going up the Maine. The walls were last reconstructed between 1230 and 1240, by order of King Louis IX. Today, portions of the wall are still visible in Rue Toussaint and on Boulevard Carnot, as are some towers, like the Tour Villebon and the Tour des Anglais.

Before the first cadastre (1810), the city had not extended much beyond its medieval limits: on and around the castle promontory, with some dwellings on the other bank of the Maine in a neighbourhood called La Doutre. That part of the city developed quickly during the industrial revolution and became a big river port. Industry was encouraged by firms like Bessonneau (textile factories) and Cointreau (distillery).

After 1850, many suburbs appeared around the train stations and the slate quarries to the south in Trélazé. Despite the port in La Doutre, demographic growth and urban extension were more significant on the eastern bank of the Maine, where the former Juliomagus had been founded.

The medieval city center was redeveloped and expanded from 1791. The Place du Ralliement, the main square, was then built in place of three churches destroyed during the French Revolution and, later, ring boulevards planted with trees replaced the city walls.

The architectural style used is mainly Haussmanian, but there are also some Palladian, Art Nouveau or Art Deco buildings.

After 1945 and the Second World War, several large council estates made of tower blocks were built around the city center, the first of them being Belle-Beille in 1953. Industrial activity changed drastically: port activity declined while new factories, such as Technicolor SA in 1957, were built. During the 1970s, the collective approach to urban development gave way to more individual houses being built for the middle class.

As the metropolitan area continued to grow, commuting became more common. New shopping areas were constructed close to the villages which had been subsumed into the city. Because of the floodplains that surround the city north and south, Angers can only grow significantly on an east–west axis.

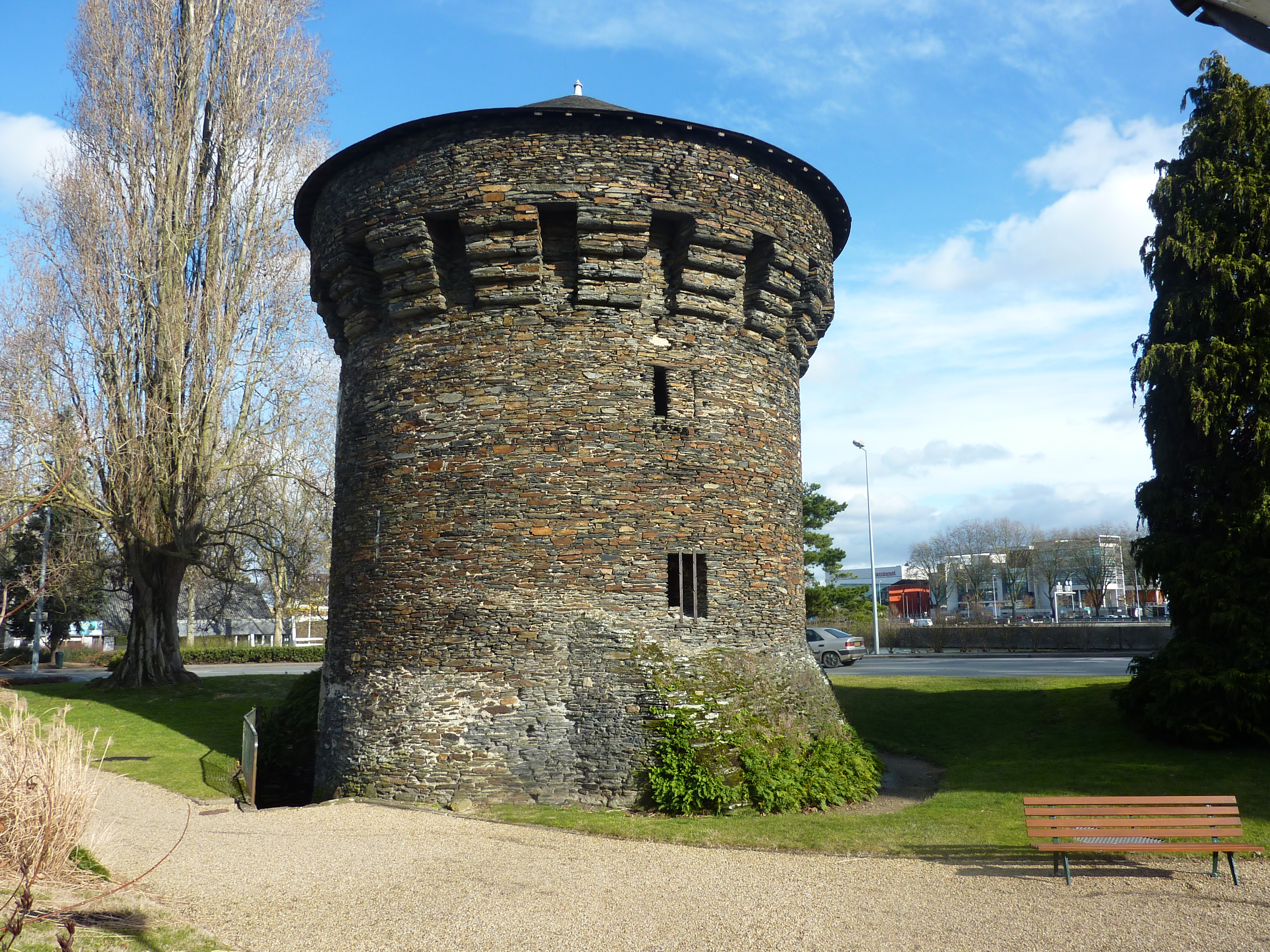
The Tour des Anglais, a remaining part of the medieval city walls

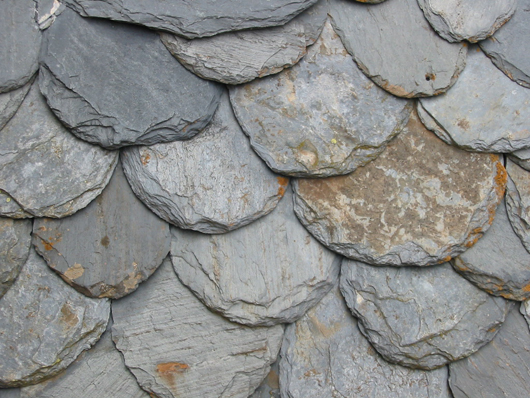
Traditional slated roof

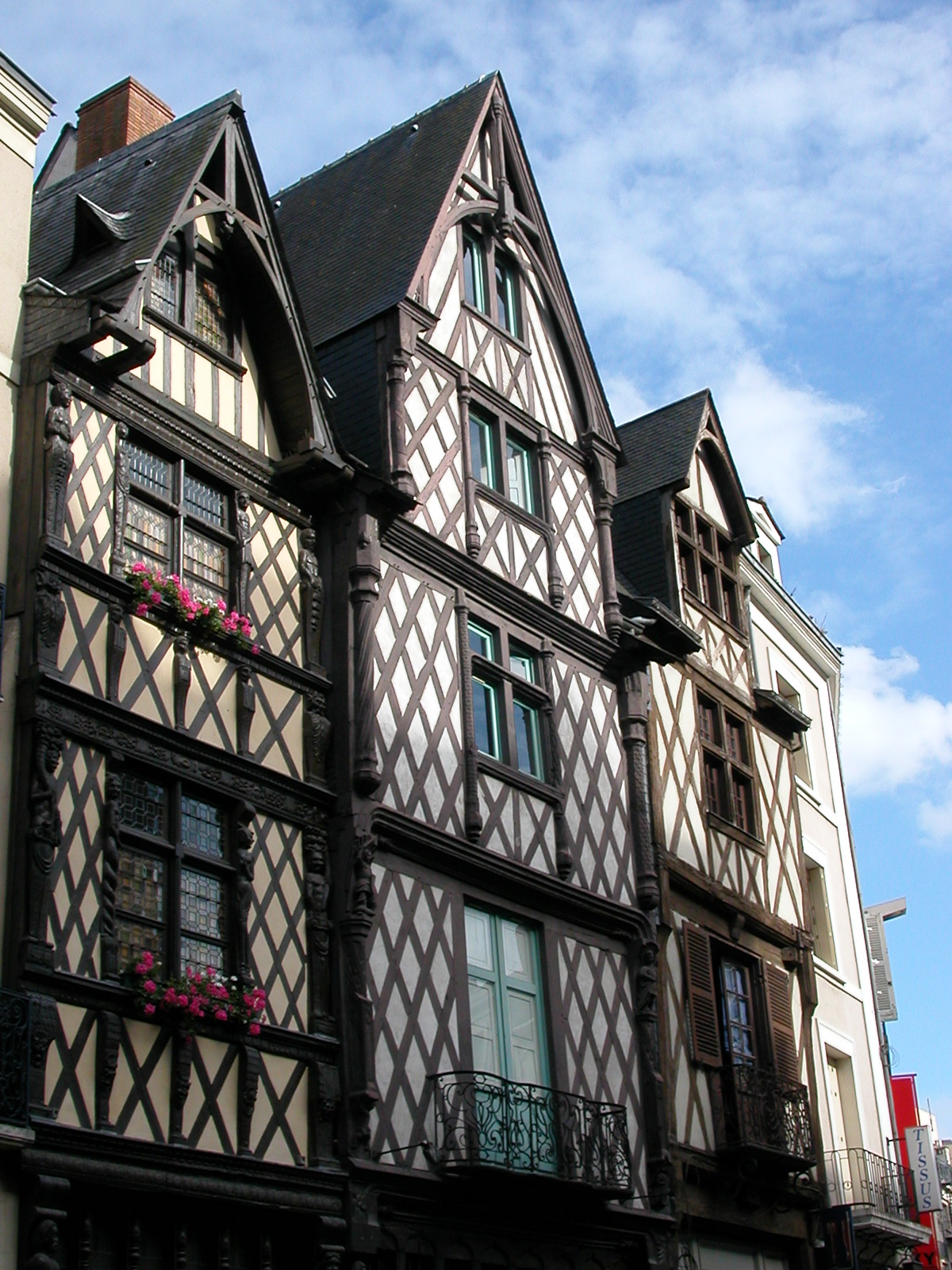
Half-timbered houses in rue de l'Oisellerie

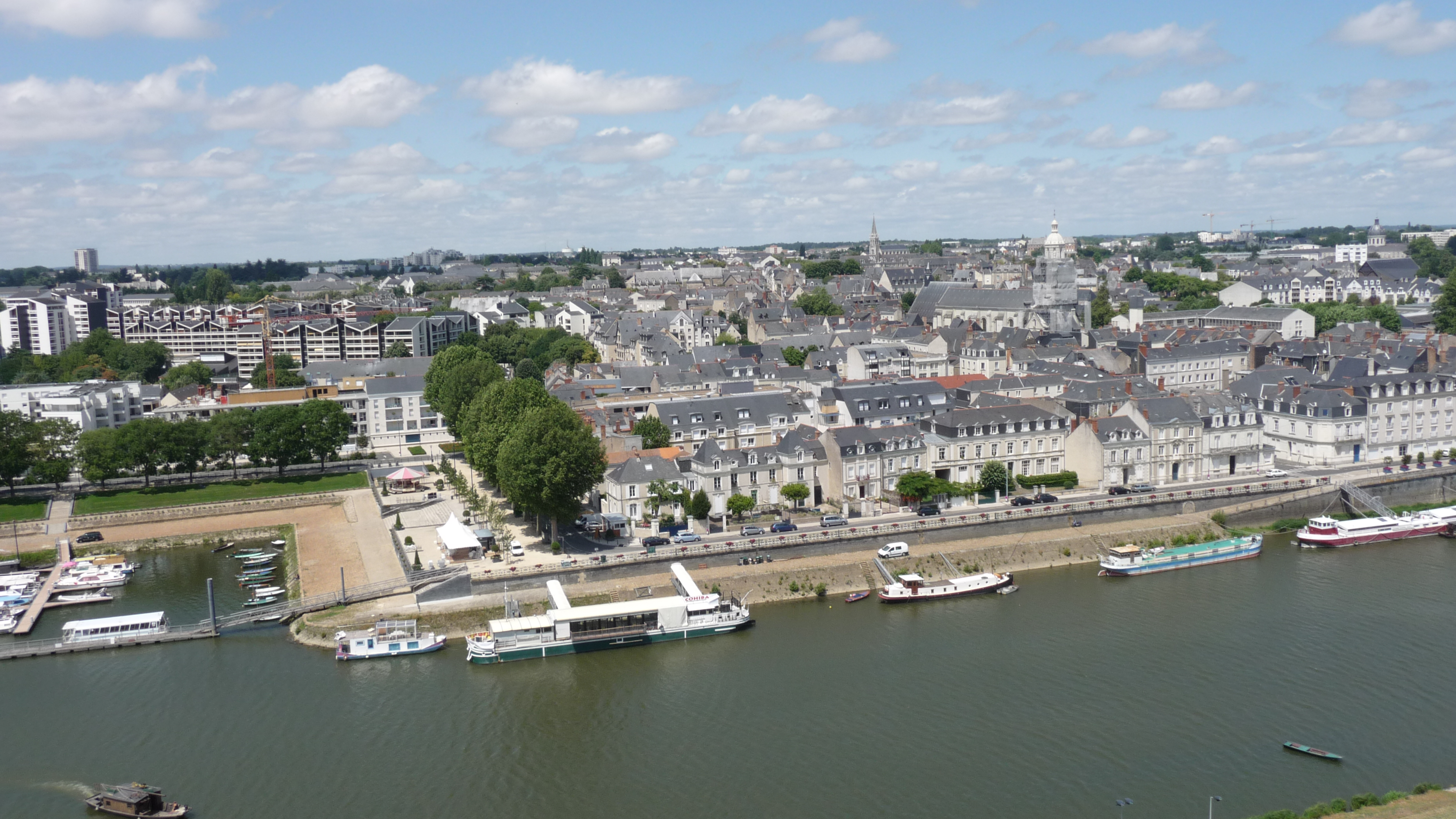
View of La Doutre; the industrial port has become a marina

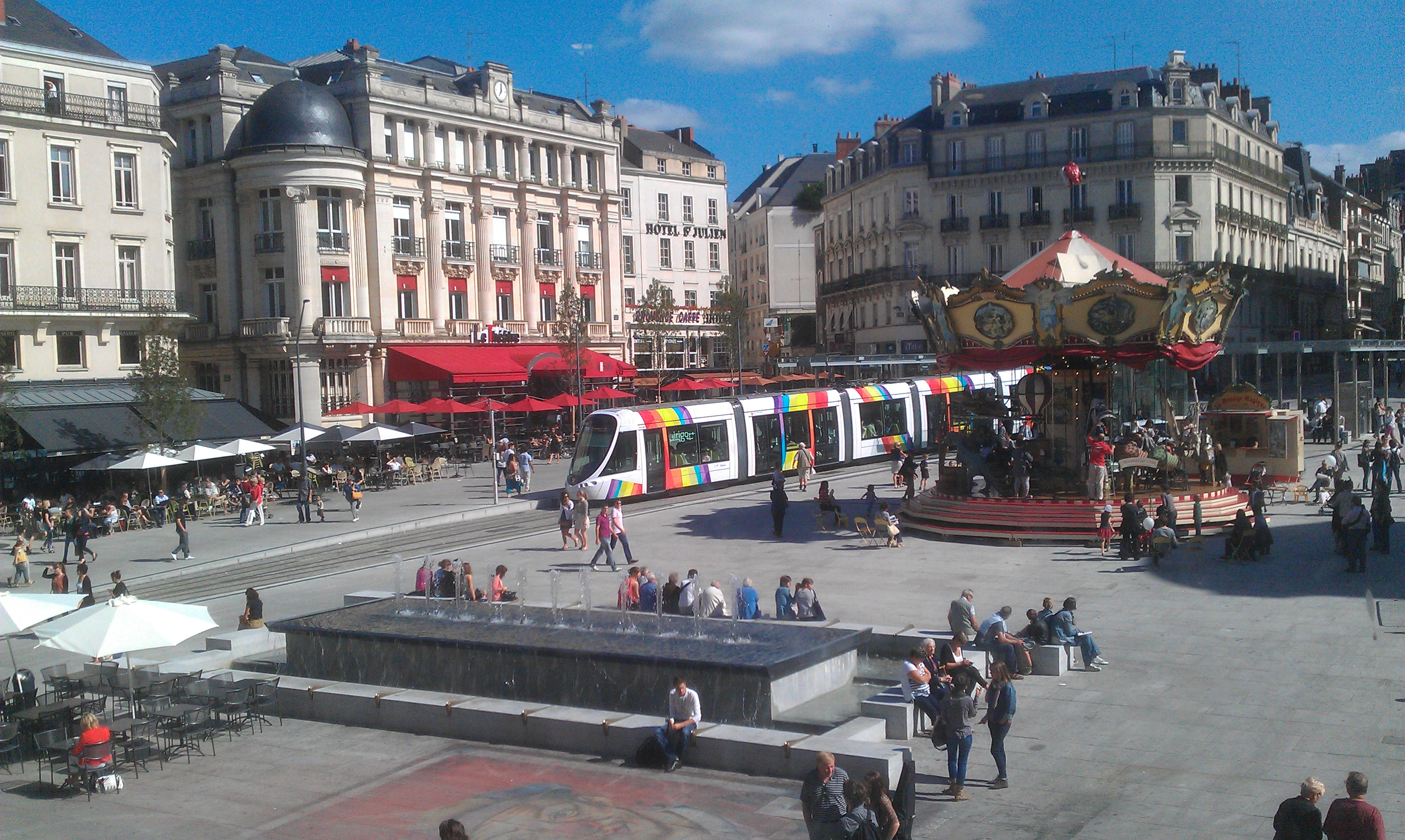
The Place du Ralliement

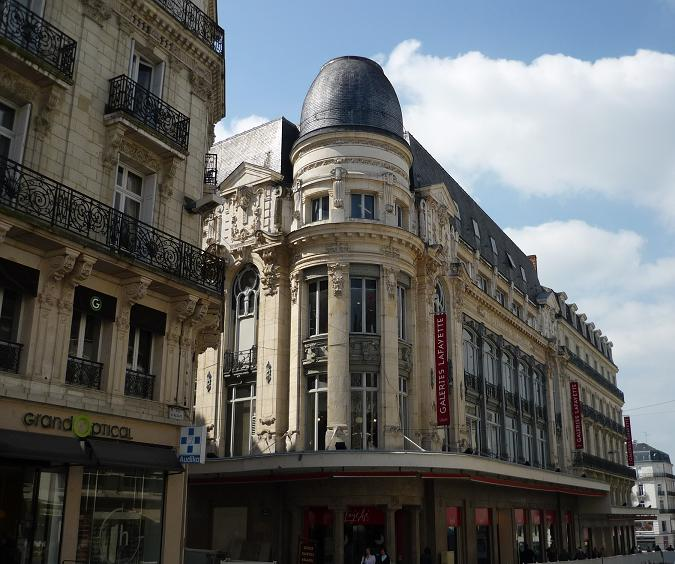
A department store on a 19th-century street

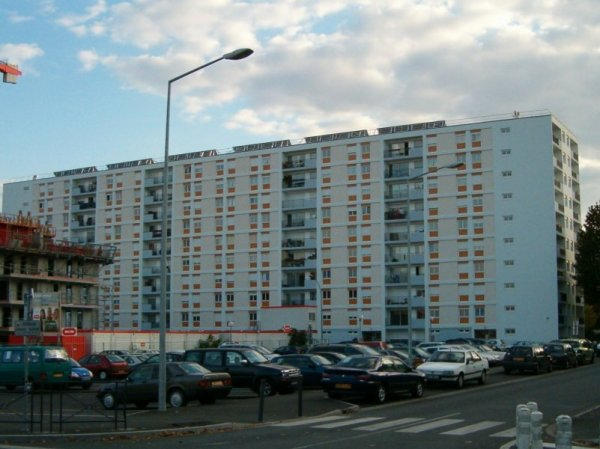
A council estate in La Roseraie

=== Green areas ===
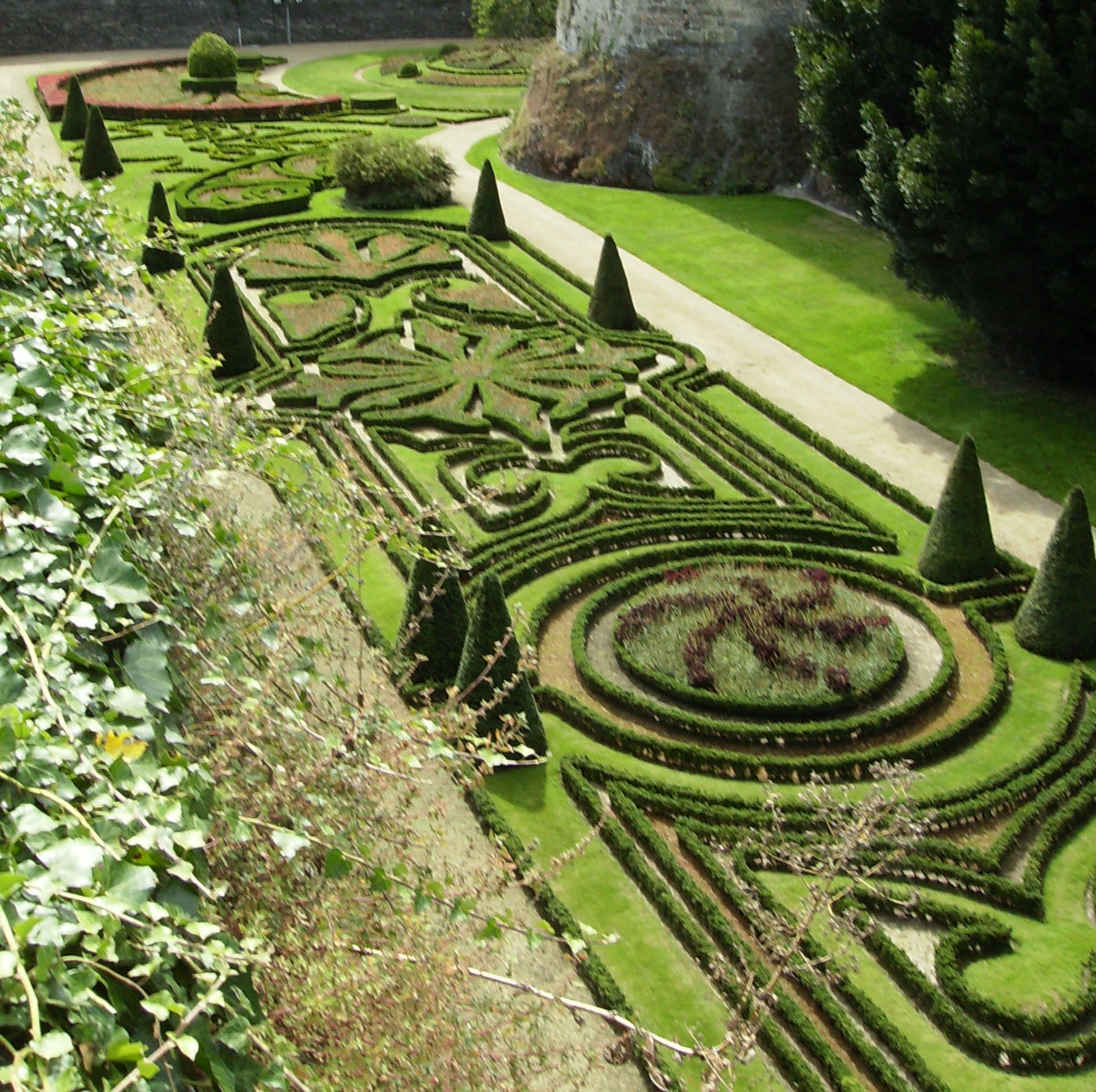
Gardens in the castle moat.

Being both at the edge of the Val de Loire World Heritage site and on the largest river confluence in France, Angers has a high natural potential, notably highlighted by the Saint-Aubin island, situated north of the center and covering a tenth of the city total surface. Protected, the island is formed of swamps and natural meadows.

The oldest green areas date back from the Renaissance, when the moats of the castle were transformed into pleasure and kitchen gardens. Similar gardens were built by the aristocracy around their hôtels particuliers and physic garden were planted in hospices cloisters. The Jardin des plantes, the first botanical garden, dates back from the beginning of the 18th century. During the 19th century, others were built, for example the Faculty of Pharmacy garden and the Roseraie. The first recreational parks, for their part, were built during the Second French Empire. The étang Saint-Nicolas, made by a sluice on a small river, the Brionneau, was protected as early as 1936.

The Jardin du Mail (Mall Garden), an esplanade situated outside the ring boulevards, was built between 1820 and 1880 on the former Champs de Mars (Fields of Mars, a place where the garrisons used to train and parade). Another esplanade, the Mail François Mitterrand, was built in 1999 together with a garden inside the new Saint-Serge business district. During the 1960s the old gravel pits around the Maine were filled with water to form the Lac de Maine, which now hosts a marina. In 2010, a large amusement park, Terra Botanica, was inaugurated close to Saint-Aubin island.

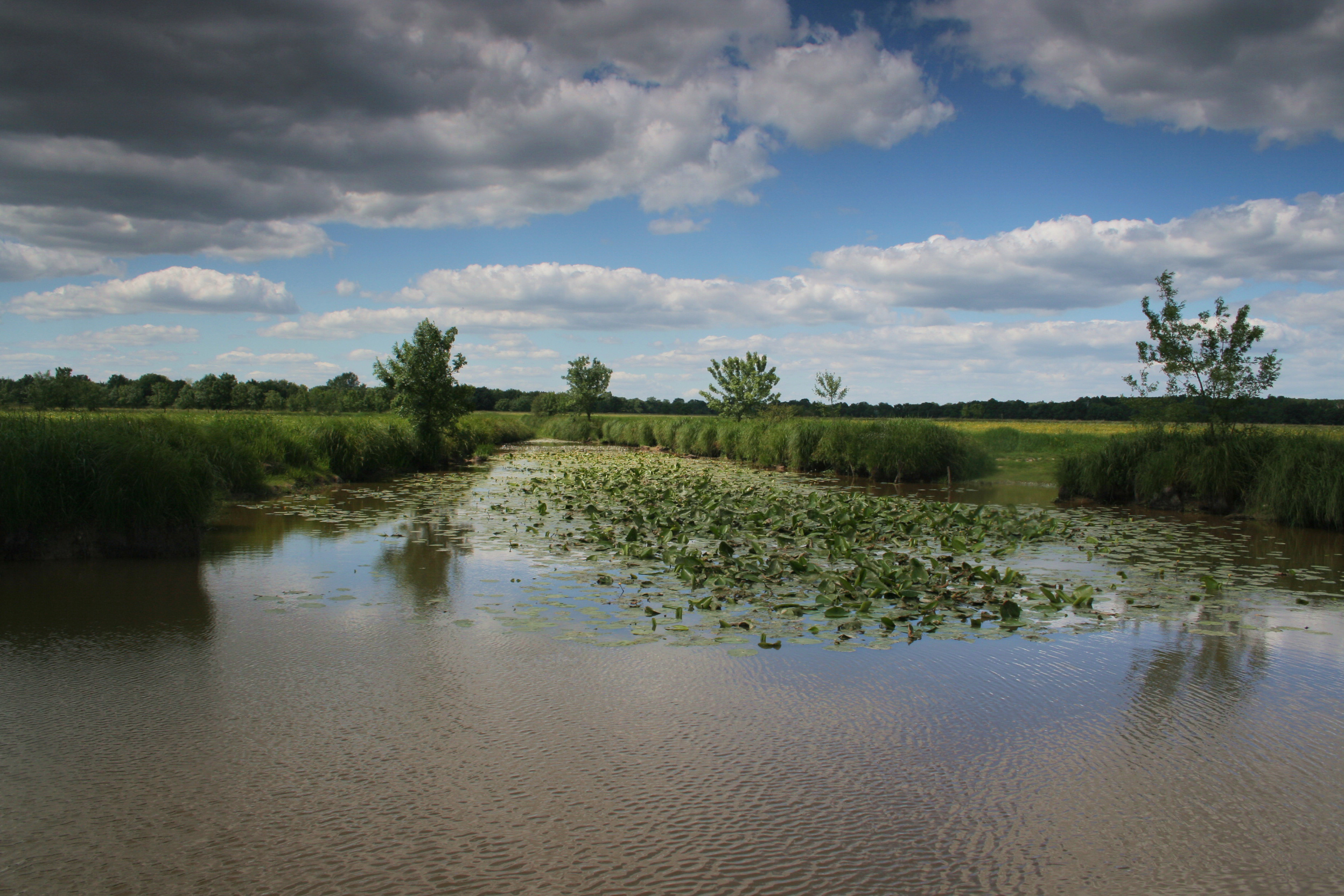
The Saint-Aubin island protected area

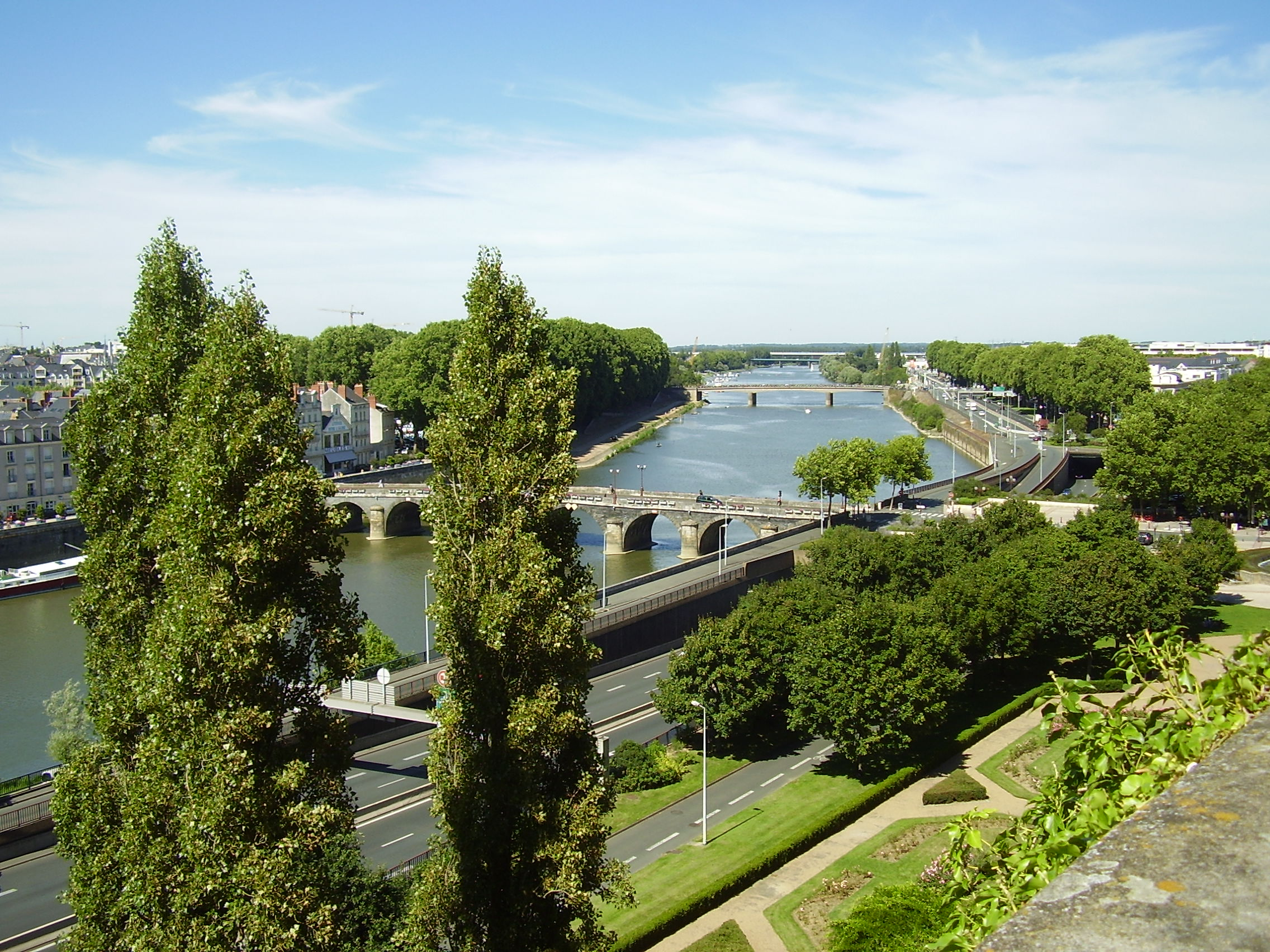
Planted quays around the river Maine

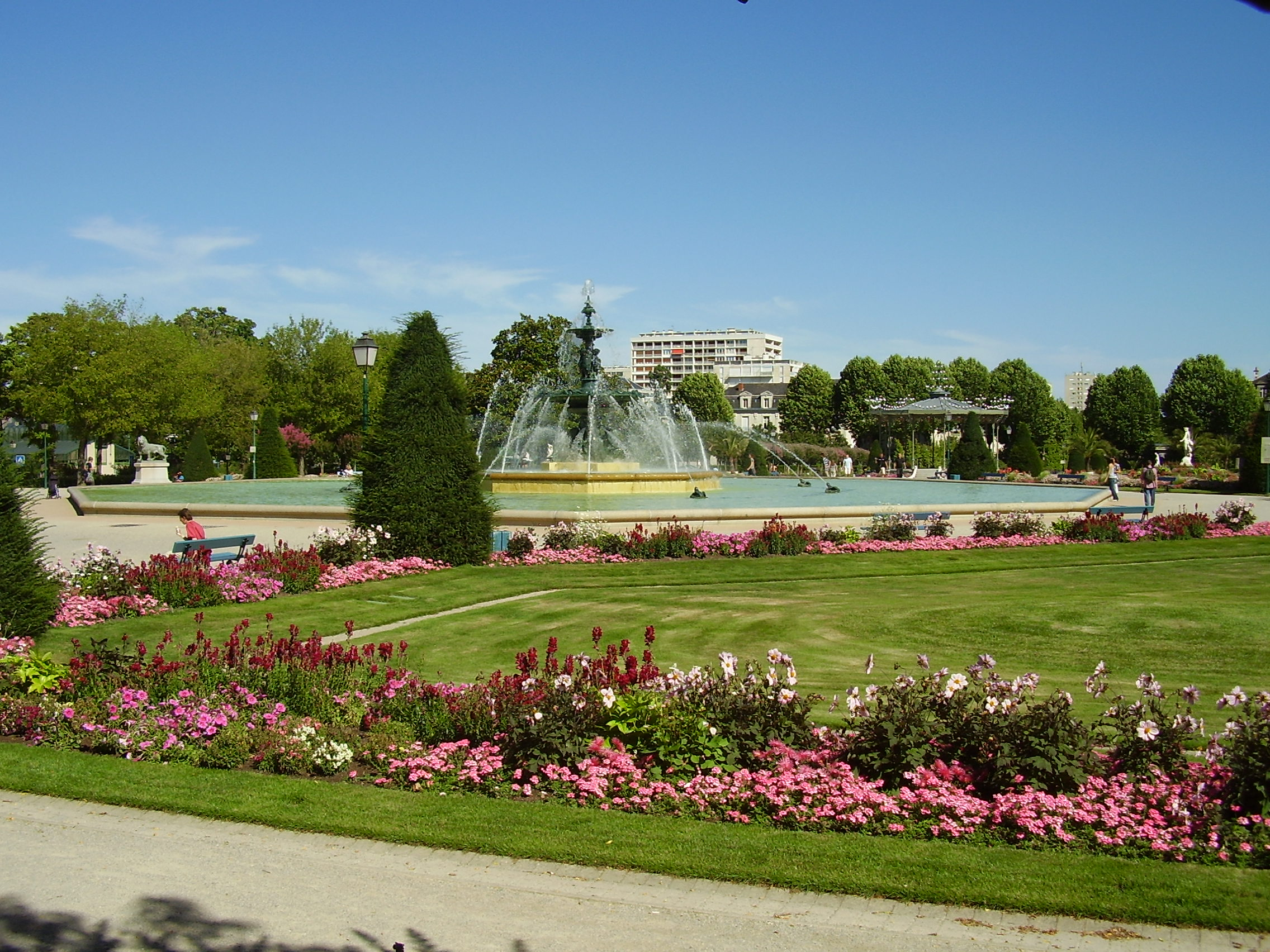
Jardin du Mail

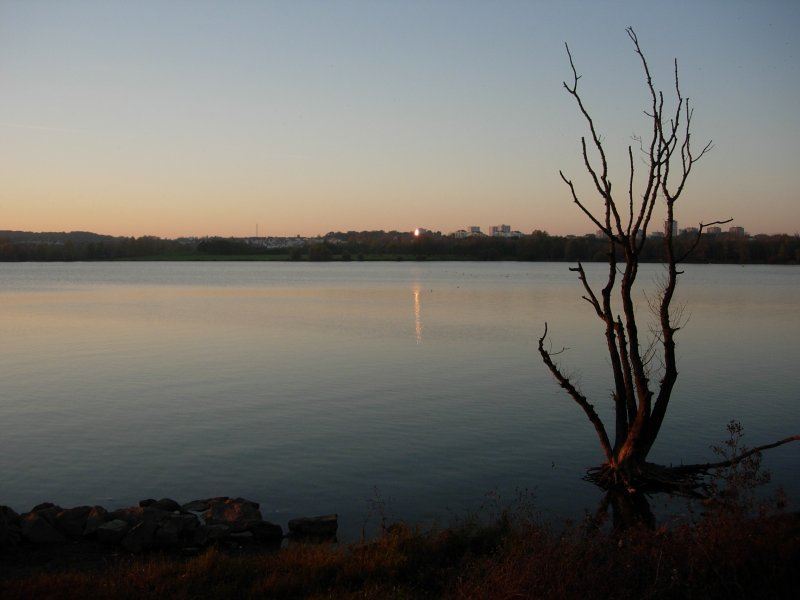
Sunset on the Lac de Maine

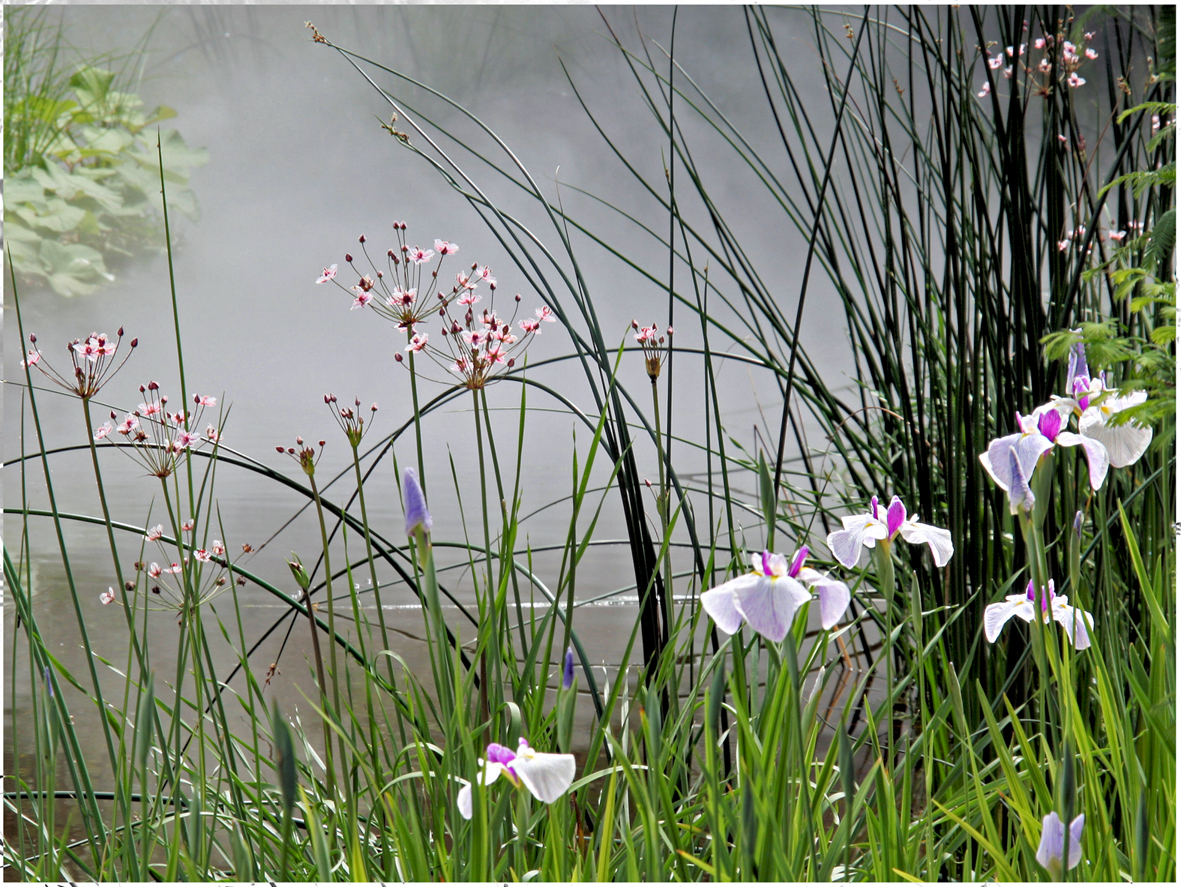
Terra Botanica

== History ==
=== Prehistory and antiquity ===
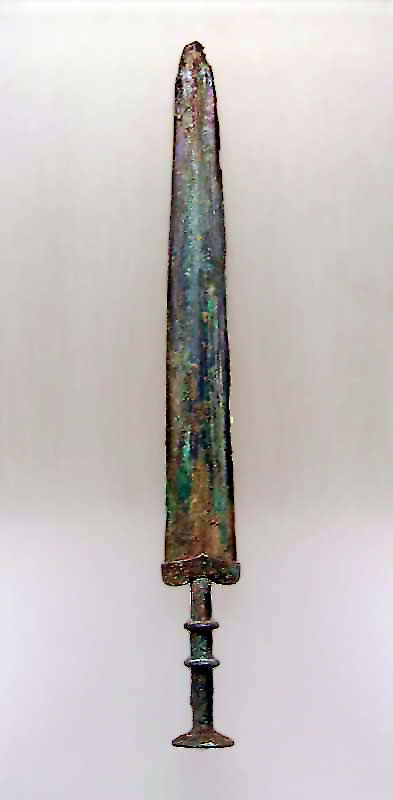
A model of a sword from the Bronze Age discovered in the 2000s in the Maine riverbed

The first sign of human presence in Angers dates back to around 400,000 BC. Vestiges from the Neolithic are more abundant and include numerous polished stone axes. Burials from 4500 x 3500 BC were also discovered on the castle grounds.

During the 5th century BC, the Andecavi, a Celtic people, settled north of the Loire. By the end of the Iron Age, Angers was a relatively densely populated hillfort. While the settlement's Roman name—Juliomagus—may be older, it is only attested from the 3rd century. The Roman town consisted of many villas and baths and had an amphitheater as well as a Mithraeum, a temple dedicated to Mithra.

Successive Germanic invasions in AD 275 and 276 forced the inhabitants to move to the highest point of their city and to build a wall around a small area of around 9 hectares (22 acres).

=== Middle Ages ===
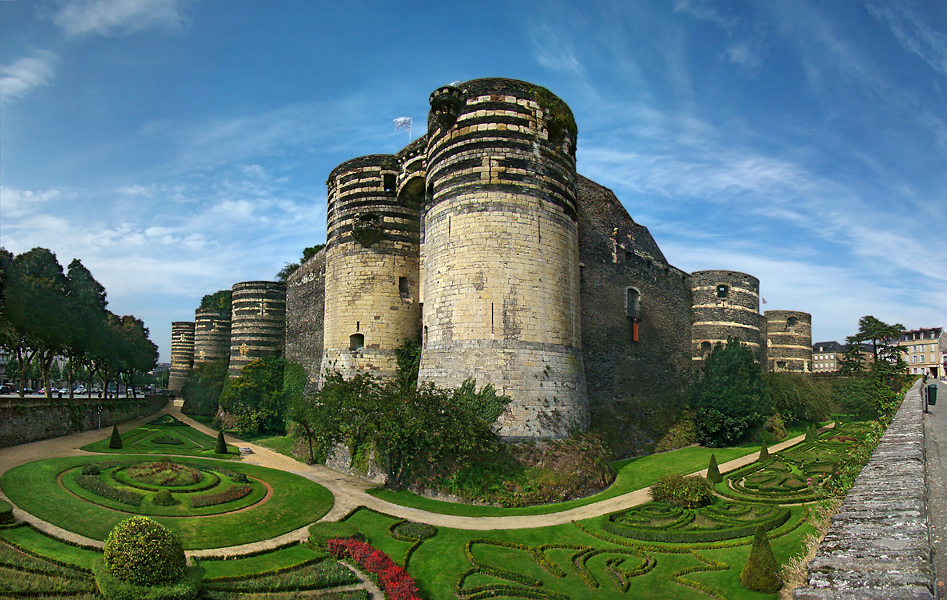
The castle, seat of the Plantagenêt dynasty

Angers received its first bishop in 372 during the election of Martin of Tours. The first abbey, Saint-Aubin, was built during the 7th century to house the sarcophagus of Saint Albinius. Saint-Serge Abbey was founded by the Merovingian kings Clovis II and Theuderic III a century later. In 2008, ten Frankish sarcophagi from that period were discovered where Saint-Morille church once stood during the tramway construction.

From the 850s, Angers suffered from its situation on the border with Brittany and Normandy. In September 851, Charles the Bald and Erispoe, a Breton chief, met in the town to sign the Treaty of Angers, which secured Breton independence and fixed the borders of Brittany. However, the situation remained dangerous for Angers, and Charles the Bald created in 853 a wide buffer zone around Brittany with parts of Anjou, Touraine, Maine and Sées, which was ruled by Robert the Strong, a great-grandfather of Hugh Capet.

In 870, the Viking chief Hastein seized Angers where he settled until a successful siege temporarily displaced him. He again took control of the town in 873, before the Carolingian Emperor ousted him.

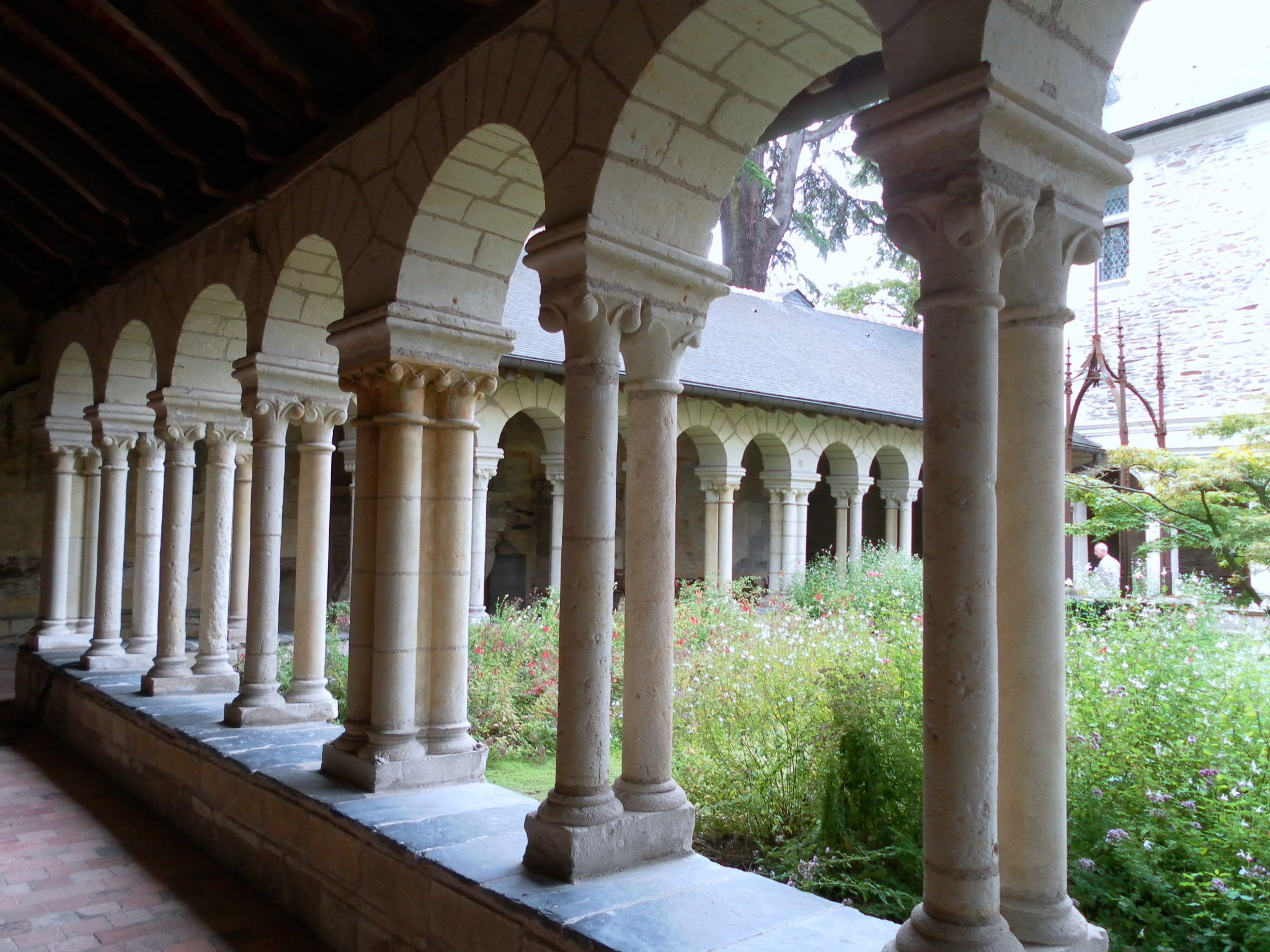
The Hospice Saint-Jean, founded by Henry II Plantagenêt

Fulk I of Anjou, a Carolingian descendant, was the first viscount of Angers (before 898 until 929) and of Tours (898–909), and count of Nantes (909–919). Around 929, he took the title of count (earl) of Angers and founded the first Anjou dynasty, the House of Ingelger (French: Ingelgériens). Angers subsequently formed the capital of the province of Anjou.

During the 12th century, after internal divisions in Brittany, the county of Nantes was annexed by Anjou. Henry II Plantagenêt kept it for more than 30 years. The grandson of Henry I of England, he also succeeded to the English crown and ruled the vast Angevin Empire, which stretched from the Pyrenees to Ireland. The castle of Angers was then the seat of the Court and the dynasty. The Empire disappeared in 1204–1205 when the King of France, Philip II, seized Normandy and Anjou. Henceforth, there were no more counts of Anjou, as the French king had made Anjou a dukedom.

Now a part of the Kingdom of France, Angers became the "Key to the Kingdom" (Clé du Royaume) facing still independent Brittany. In 1228, during Louis IX's minority, Blanche of Castile decided to fortify the city and to rebuild the castle. Later, during the 1350s and 1360s, the schools of Law, Medicine and Theology, renowned in Europe, were organized into a university. In 1373, Louis I of Naples and Anjou ordered the six tapestries illustrating the Apocalypse of St John known today as the Apocalypse Tapestry.

=== Renaissance ===
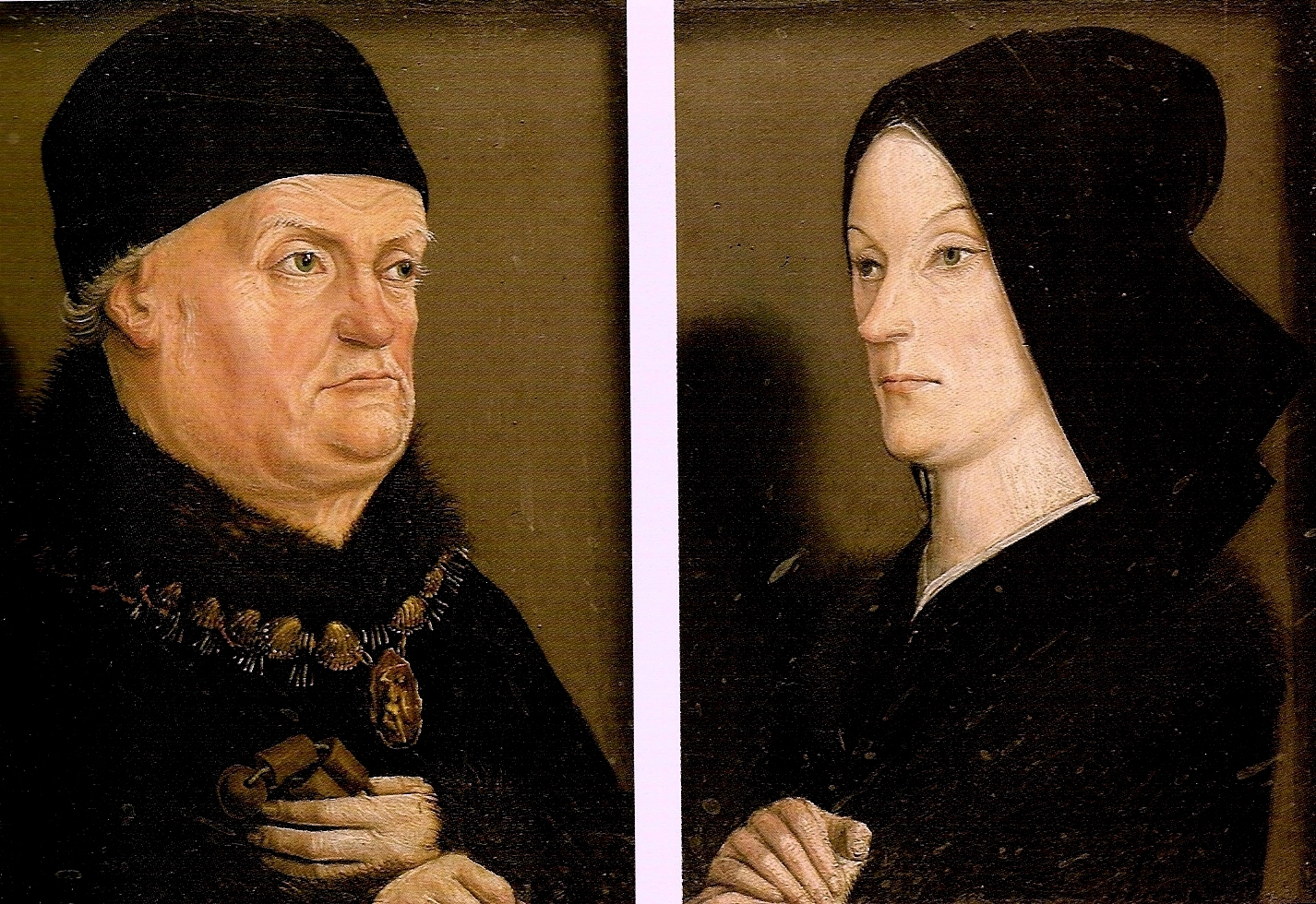
René of Naples and Anjou, nicknamed Good King René, and his second wife, Jeanne de Laval

King René of Anjou contributed to the economic revival in a city that had been diminished by the Black Death (1347–1350) and the Hundred Years War (1337–1453). A man of great culture and generosity, René transformed Angers into a cultural and political center and held court there. He transformed the castle moat into a menagerie and built several gardens. He also founded in Angers a new Ordre du Croissant which was supposed to compete with the Order of the Golden Fleece, created several years earlier.

In 1474, Louis XI, in his attempt to conquer Anjou, came to Angers with his army, asking for the keys of the city. René, then 65 years old, did not want to lead a war against his nephew and surrendered his domains without a fight. Thus, Anjou ceased to be an appanage and fell into the Royal domain. After his death, René was buried in 1480 in Saint-Maurice cathedral.

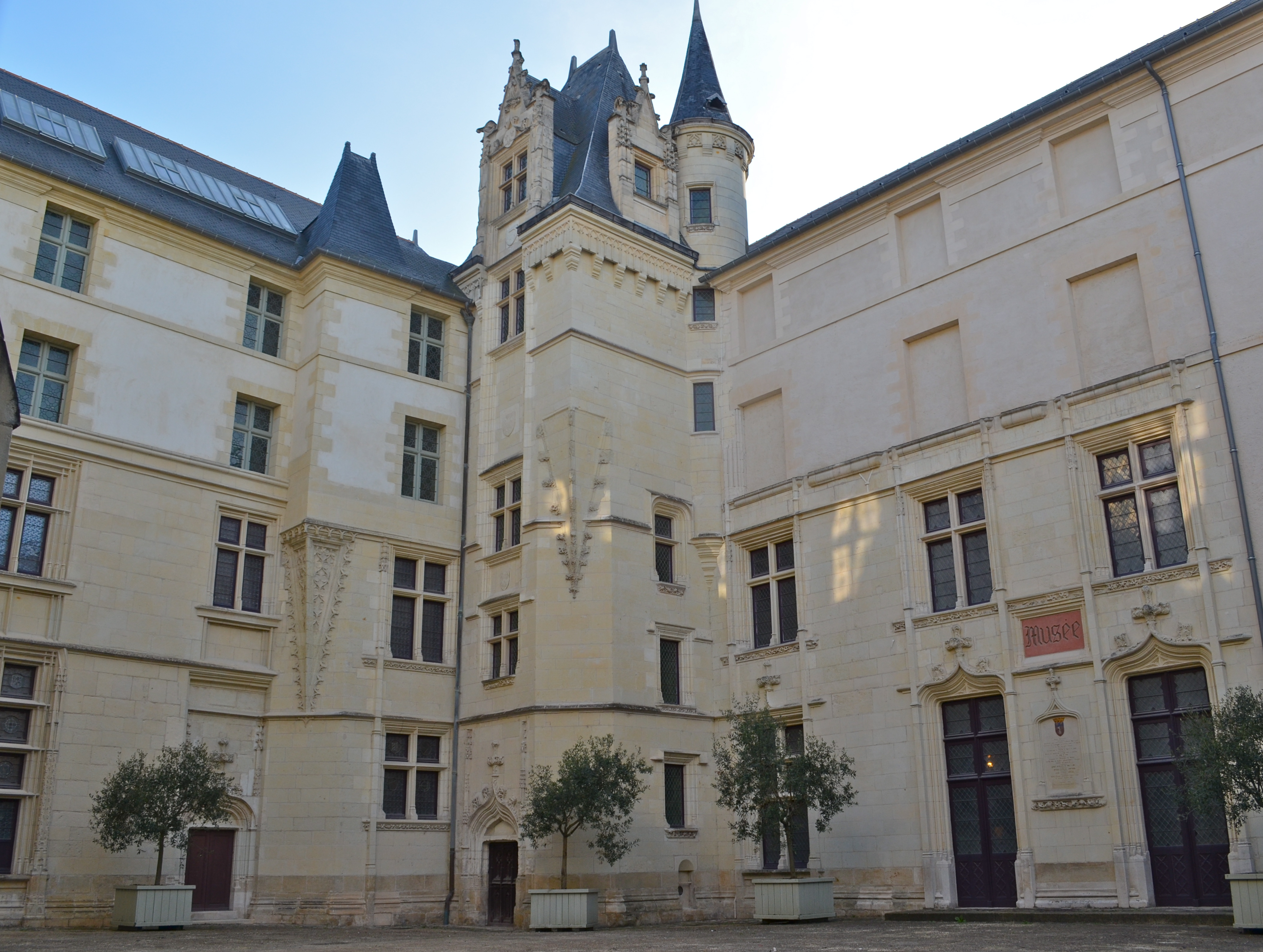
The Logis Barrault, where the Edict of Nantes was prepared

In 1551, Angers became the seat of a bailiwick and the presidial court of a jurisdiction, a position the city kept until 1790. At the same time, with the growth of Protestantism in France, a Catholic was placed at the head of the city and its castle while the bourgeoisie formed a Catholic militia to protect Angers from the Huguenots. The bishop, Gabriel Bouvery, organized on his side an "Angevin League".

When the news of the St. Bartholomew's Day massacre reached Angers, another massacre took place in the city. The bodies of slain Protestants were thrown into the Mayenne. It was the aldermen who stopped the slaughter.

In 1598, the Edict of Nantes was prepared by Henri IV in Angers. From 6 March until 2 April, Angers was the de facto capital of France and the King tried all means to satisfy the Catholics of the city, for example by laying the cornerstone of the new Capucine convent.

=== Classical period ===
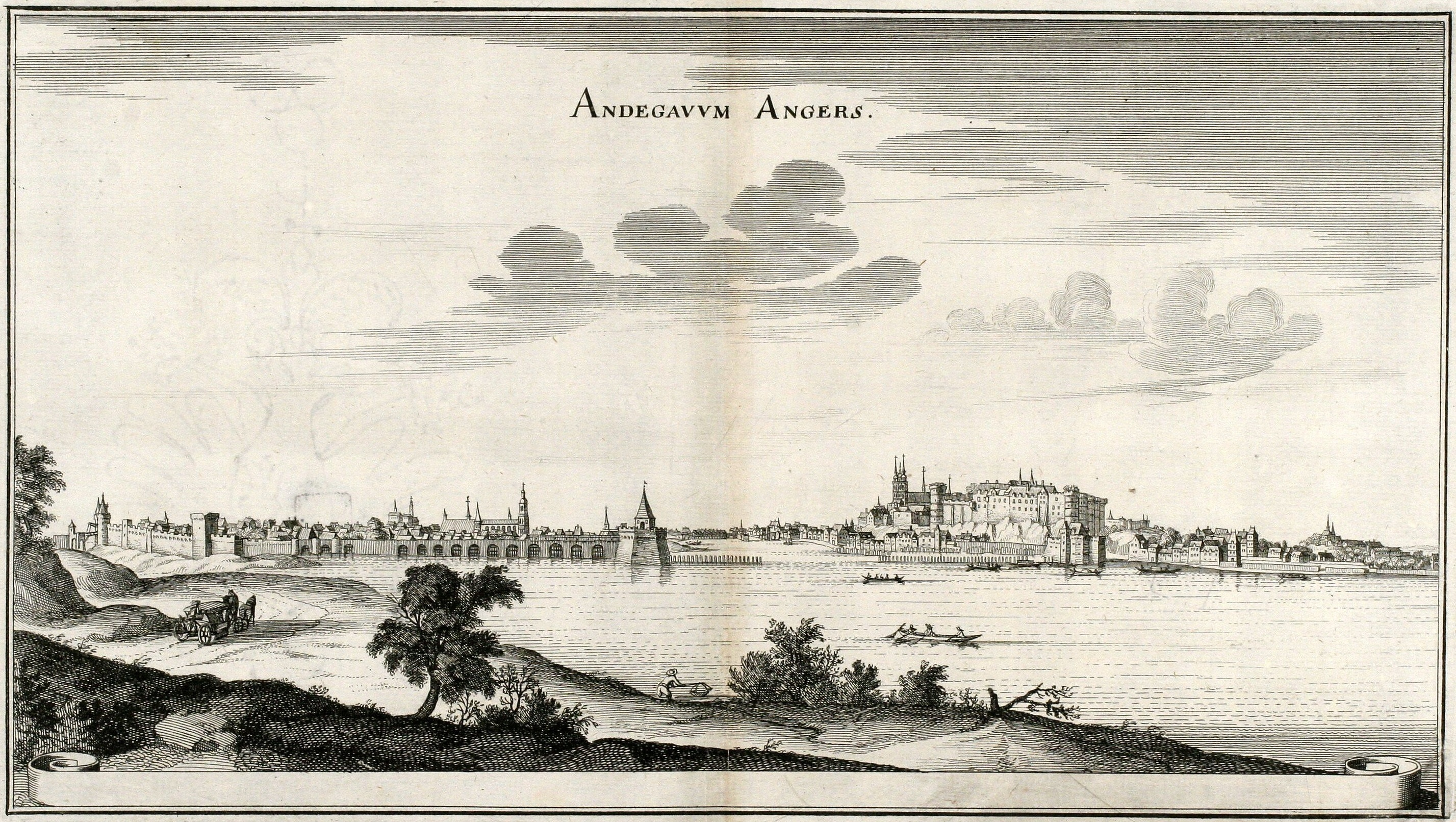
The town is called Andegavum Angers on this 1657 engraving

In 1619, Louis XIII gave the governance of Anjou to his mother, Marie de' Medici. The Queen Mother settled in Angers, at the Logis Barrault, with her chaplain, Cardinal Richelieu.

At the premature death of Louis XIII in 1643, his son Louis XIV was only an infant. France was troubled at this time by several famines and epidemics, and by political instability. In 1649, the people of Angers revolted against rising taxes, the start of the Fronde in Anjou. The Fronde was a nationwide military conflict opposing some aristocrats wanting more autonomy and the Royal forces loyal to Anne of Austria as Queen Mother and Regent, and her prime minister, Cardinal Mazarin. Royalist repression in Angers was narrowly averted by Bishop Henri Arnauld, who interceded with the Queen Mother. Arnauld, who would remain Bishop of Angers until 1692, was to leave a deep mark on the religious life of the city during the second half of the 17th century.

In 1652, Henri Chabot, Duke of Rohan and governor of Anjou, decided to back Louis of Condé, leader of the Fronde. Angers again became rebellious and Louis XIV sent his army to seize it. The Duke of Rohan immediately surrendered and thus again prevented the sack of the city.

=== French Revolution ===
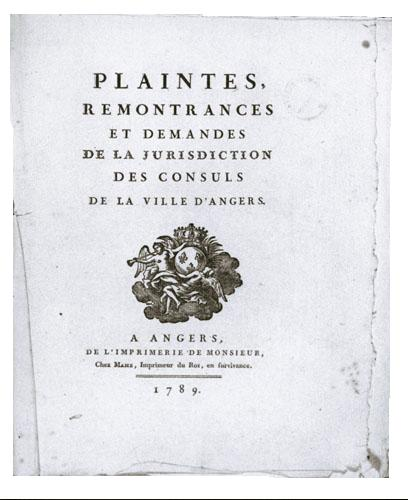
One of the cahiers de doléances written in Angers in 1789

The first months of the French Revolution were relatively quiet in Angers. In 1789, the city lost its ancient administrative positions, replaced in 1790 by the department of Mayenne-et-Loire, soon renamed "Maine-et-Loire". Anjou, as a political entity, disappeared, although the new department included most of its territory.

The War of Vendée, a Royalist rebellion and counterrevolution led in Vendée, a department located at the southwest of Maine-et-Loire, reached the Loire in March 1793. The Royalist army soon crossed the river and progressed as far as Granville, in Normandy, in November. Pushed back, the Vendéens went back south and, to cross the Loire again, had to attack Angers.

The city was defended by 4,000 Republican soldiers, whereas the Royalists were at least 20,000, but weakened by successive fights and deceases. The Siege of Angers occurred on 3 and 4 December 1793. The Royalists' bad tactics, as well as the strength of Angers city wall and castle, caused their loss. They consequently went back north for a while, around Le Mans, before crossing the Loire at Ancenis on 16 December.

In 1794, fierce repression was conducted in the whole region against the Royalists. In Angers, 290 prisoners were shot and 1020 died of illness in jail. The city also welcomed many refugees, mostly Republicans living in Royalist rural areas. Between 19 and 31 May 1793, between 650 and 1000 Republican families sought asylum in Angers.

=== Since 1800 ===
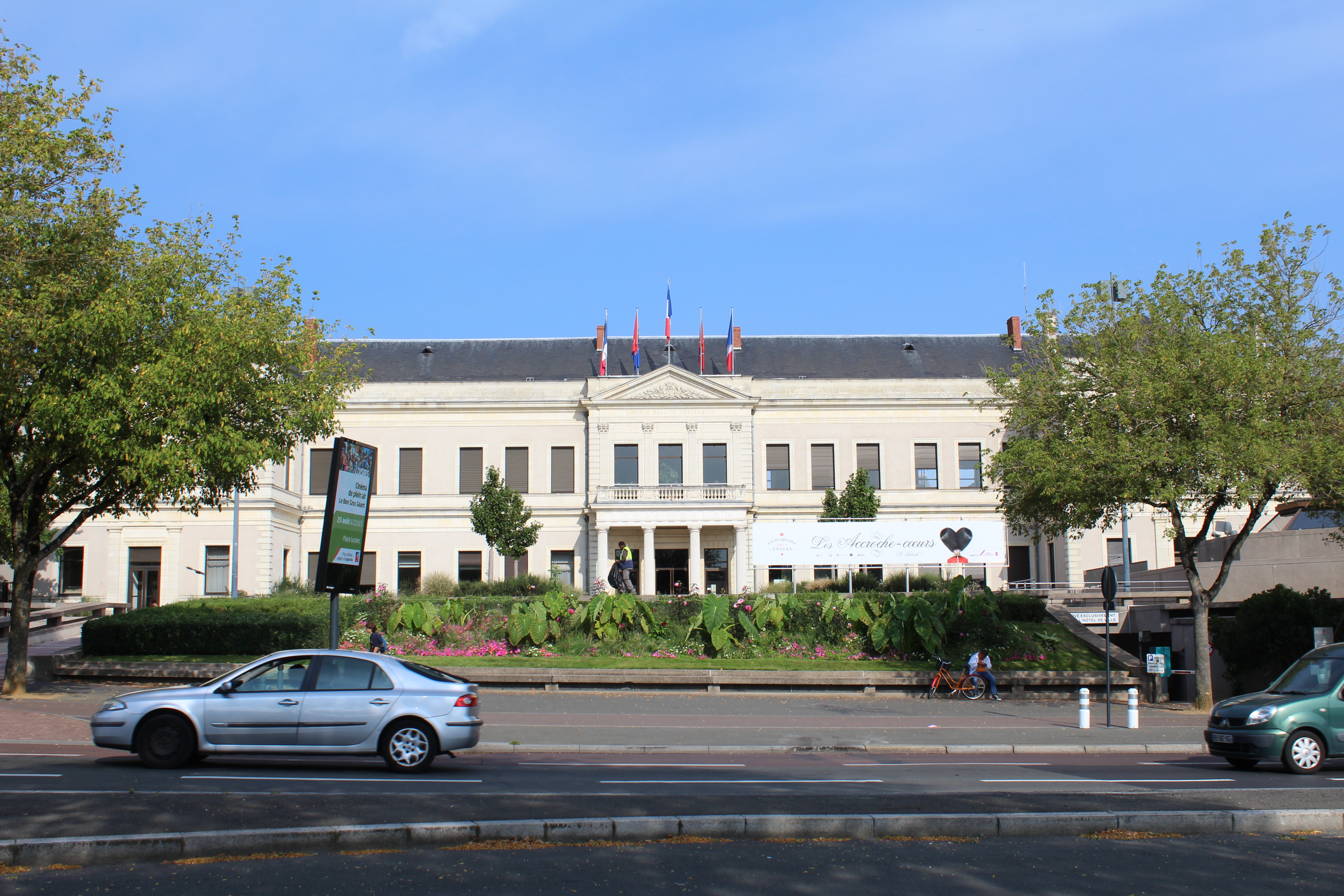
The Hôtel de Ville

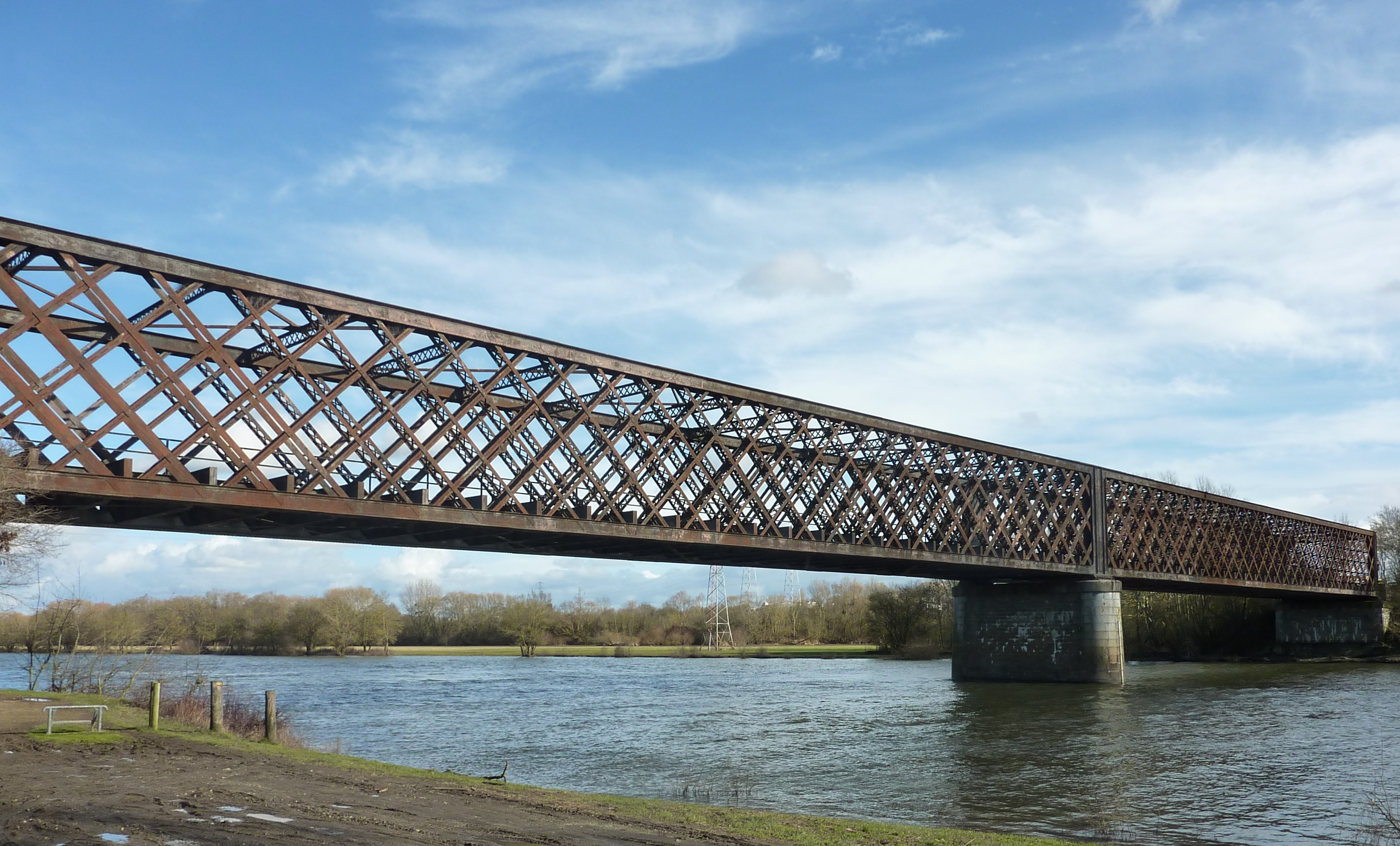
The Pont de Segré, a truss railroad bridge built on the Maine during the second half of the 19th century

During the 19th century, the city was deeply influenced by the urban transformations in Paris. The city traditionally had a somewhat sombre appearance from the quantity of local slate used in construction but many quarters were gradually destroyed, redeveloped, or rebuilt on the Parisian model. The city wall, which formed a square around the old city core, was demolished around 1850 and replaced by wide boulevards. New districts of the city were also opened up on the opposite bank of the river.

The Hôtel de Ville (City Hall) was officially opened as a municipal building on 23 September 1823.

In 1849, the Angers-Saumur railway was built; it was extended to Nantes two years later. When completed, the line connected Paris to the Atlantic coast.

In 1850, a catastrophic failure of the Angers Bridge suspension bridge caused the deaths of over 200 soldiers. The disaster inhibited the construction of suspension bridges in France for two decades. The accident was mainly caused by soldiers' lilting march which created resonance in the bridge structure.

In 1875, a "free faculty" was created. It was soon assimilated to the medieval Angevin University (Universitas Andegavensis), which had been dissolved during the French Revolution. The new faculty was canonically erected as the Catholic University of Angers (Université catholique d'Angers) by Pope Pius IX in 1879. However, in 1890, a law prohibited private institutions of higher education from calling themselves "universities". The institution was then renamed the "Free Faculty of Angers" (Faculté libre d'Angers), although it kept its original name on an informal basis. At the beginning of the 20th century, two higher education establishments, specializing in agriculture and commercial sciences, were opened.

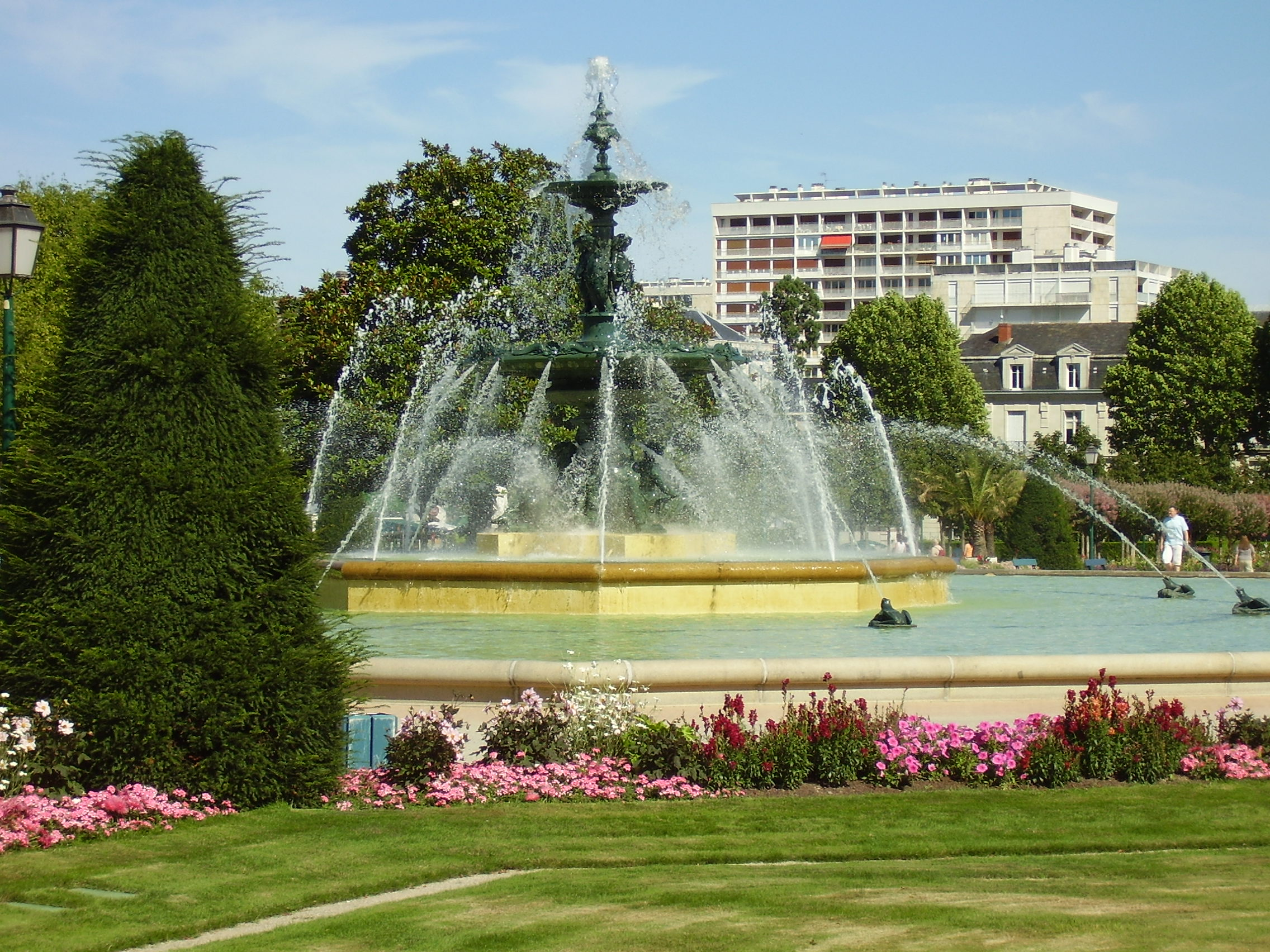
The fountain in Jardin du Mail, built for the 1900 Exposition Universelle in Paris

During the first half of the 20th century, several Art Nouveau and Art Deco buildings were constructed, such as the Nouvelles Galeries, the Hotel des Postes, Hotel Continental, the Alcazar and the Maison bleue.

In September 1939, when Poland was invaded by Germany, the Polish government-in-exile settled in Angers. It left the city on 12 June 1940, after the invasion of France by the Wehrmacht. Angers fell to the Nazis during the same month. The Germans made it the seat of a regional Kommandantur. In 1941, a first Resistance movement, called Honneur et Patrie, was created in Angers. 60 Resistants were shot at the Belle-Beille range in 1942 and a German bunker factory employed 6000 people in 1943. In July 1942, 853 Jews were arrested and sent to Auschwitz.

On the night of 28 May 1944, the first Allied bombing occurred over the Saint-Laud quarter. 243 people died and many others were wounded. Successive attacks on 29 and 30 May destroyed the train station and its surroundings which were reconstructed in the 1950s.

After liberating Avranches and Rennes, General George Patton and his 5th infantry division arrived in Anjou on 5 August. To seize Angers, they decided to enter the city by its eastern side to surprise the Nazis. On 9 August, they crossed the Maine and started the fight. Helped by the local French Forces of the Interior, they progressively moved forward to the city center. The fight was nevertheless difficult and Angers was liberated the day after, at around 5 p.m.

After the end of the war, the city experienced quick development and demographic growth. In 1971, a decision was made to reestablish a public university, and the Université catholique d'Angers was split between the Université catholique de l'Ouest (private) and the Université d'Angers (public). Angers continues to have two different universities.

Until the 1980s, Angers experienced several massive urban development plans, such as the construction of the Lac de Maine, and several vast council estates and shopping malls, as well as the construction of a highway which crossed the city through its center, a project that forced the destruction of many old buildings and destroyed the original quays on the Maine. Later, other urban plans were drawn up, with a new emphasis on nature and heritage protection, as well as on social mixing. During the 1990s, the redevelopment of the Saint-Serge quarter, located just north of the historical center, produced a new business center, gardens and university buildings.

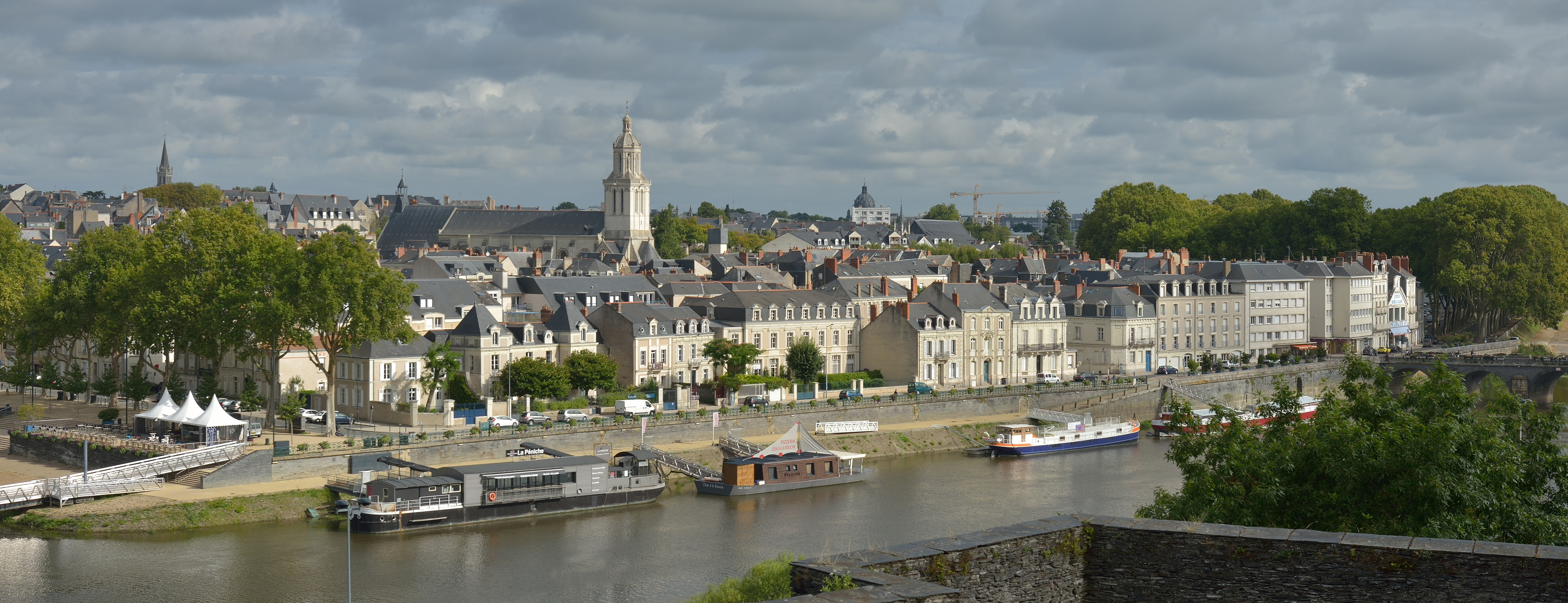
View of Angers and the Maine river

== Administration ==
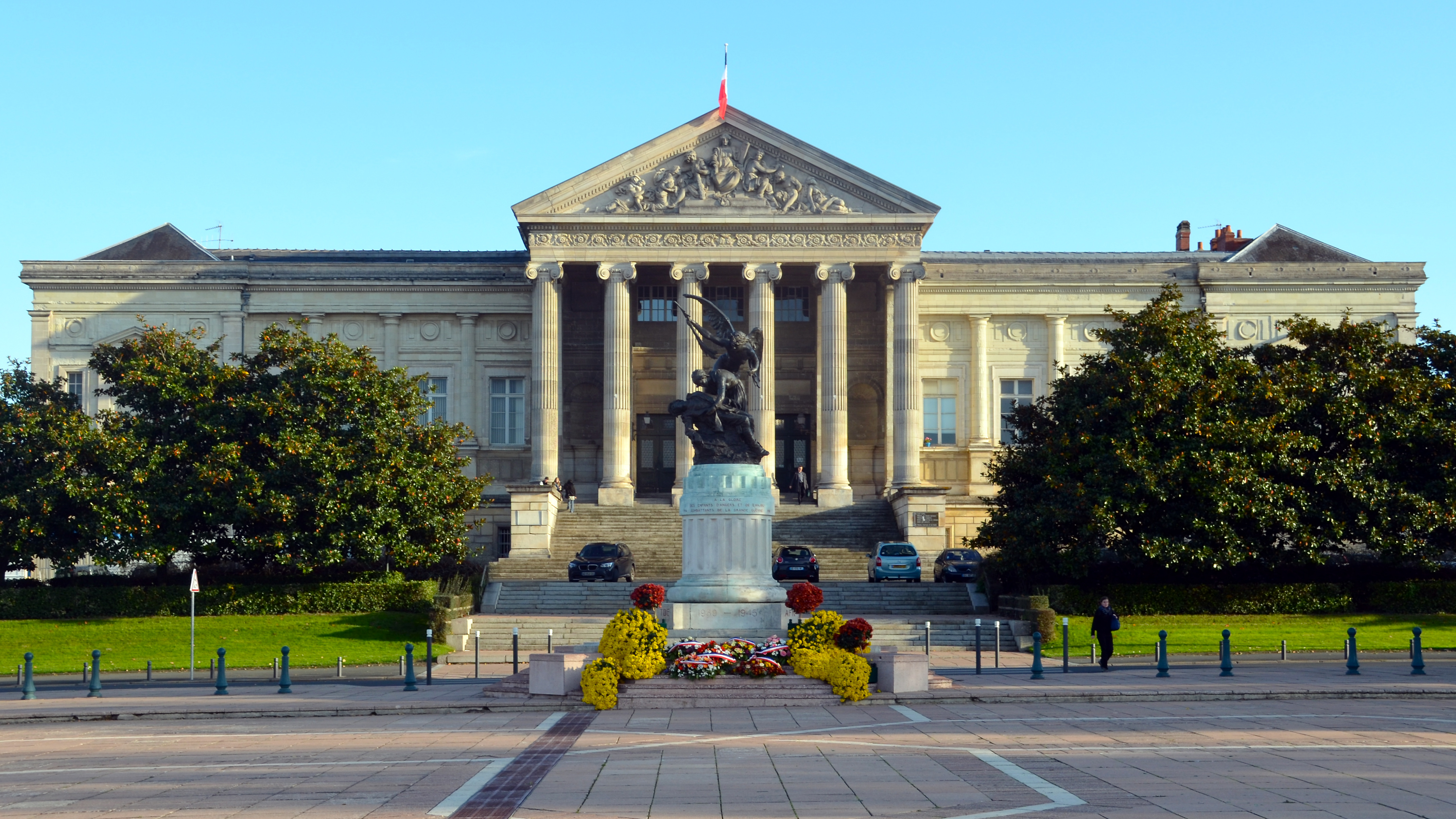
The court of appeal in the Jardin du Mail

Angers received its communal charter from Louis XI in February 1475, but free elections for the mayor and aldermen were not guaranteed before 1484, following a decision by Charles VIII. Since then, 75 successive mayors have governed Angers.

Until the Second World War, Angers was mainly governed by centrist and republican mayors. From 1977 until 2014, all the successive mayors were members of the Socialist Party, whereas the Maine-et-Loire department has always been governed by moderate right-wing parties. The current mayor (as at May 2023) is Jean-Marc Verchère.

Angers is divided into eight cantons; most of them include parts of Angers plus some surrounding communes. These cantons are not administrative entities and only serve to elect the members of the department council. The INSEE, the French institute for statistics, divides the commune of Angers into twelve sectors. Depending on their social and economic issues, some of them can have priority for financial assistance and urban regeneration. In Angers, five are considered as priority sectors, three as sensitive urban areas, and one as an urban free zone.

Being the chef-lieu of Maine-et-Loire, Angers is the seat of a prefecture. It is also the seat of a Court of Appeal and of several regional or local institutes, concerning for example, customs, education or science. Angers also has several other courts of justice as well as a prison.

== Demographics ==
Angers is the 18th most populated commune in France. In 2022, the urban area (unité urbaine), which encompasses Angers plus eleven surrounding communes (243.3 square kilometers (93.9 square miles) in total), had 250,031 inhabitants. The metropolitan area (aire d'attraction) included in 2022 81 communes, 443,887 inhabitants and 2,419 square kilometres (934 square miles). The Angers Loire Métropole, an economic and political association of communes, includes 29 communes and around 309,000 inhabitants.

Historical population

Year	Pop.	±% p.a.
1793	33,900	—
1800	33,000	−0.38%
1806	29,187	−2.03%
1821	29,873	+0.15%
1831	32,743	+0.92%
1836	35,901	+1.86%
1841	39,884	+2.13%
1846	44,781	+2.34%
1851	46,599	+0.80%
1856	50,726	+1.71%
1861	51,797	+0.42%
1866	54,791	+1.13%
1872	58,464	+1.09%

Year	Pop.	±% p.a.
1876	56,846	−0.70%
1881	68,049	+3.66%
1886	73,044	+1.43%
1891	72,669	−0.10%
1896	77,164	+1.21%
1901	82,398	+1.32%
1906	82,935	+0.13%
1911	83,786	+0.20%
1921	86,158	+0.28%
1926	86,260	+0.02%
1931	85,602	−0.15%
1936	87,988	+0.55%
1946	94,408	+0.71%

Year	Pop.	±% p.a.
1954	102,142	+0.99%
1962	115,252	+1.52%
1968	128,533	+1.83%
1975	137,591	+0.98%
1982	136,038	−0.16%
1990	141,404	+0.48%
1999	151,279	+0.75%
2007	151,108	−0.01%
2012	149,017	−0.28%
2017	152,960	+0.52%
2023	159,022	+0.65%

Source: Base Cassini from EHESS (1793-1999) and INSEE (1968-2023)

The population of Angers is relatively young, with 38% of the population being younger than 25 and 18% of residents over 65 years old. This is partially explained by the presence of two universities, 21.0% of the population between 15 and 64 being pupils and students in 2017.

Population by age of Angers, 2023 (%)

80+	6.2
65–79	11.7
55–64	9.1
40–54	15.1
25–39	19.7
15–24	23.4
0–14	14.7

Total: 99.9

male

female

Source: INSEE

Population by age of Maine-et-Loire, 2023 (%)

90+	6.5
75–89	14.6
60–74	12.1
45–59	18.9
30–44	16.7
15–29	13.3
0–14	17.9

Total: 100

male

female

Source: INSEE

== Economy ==
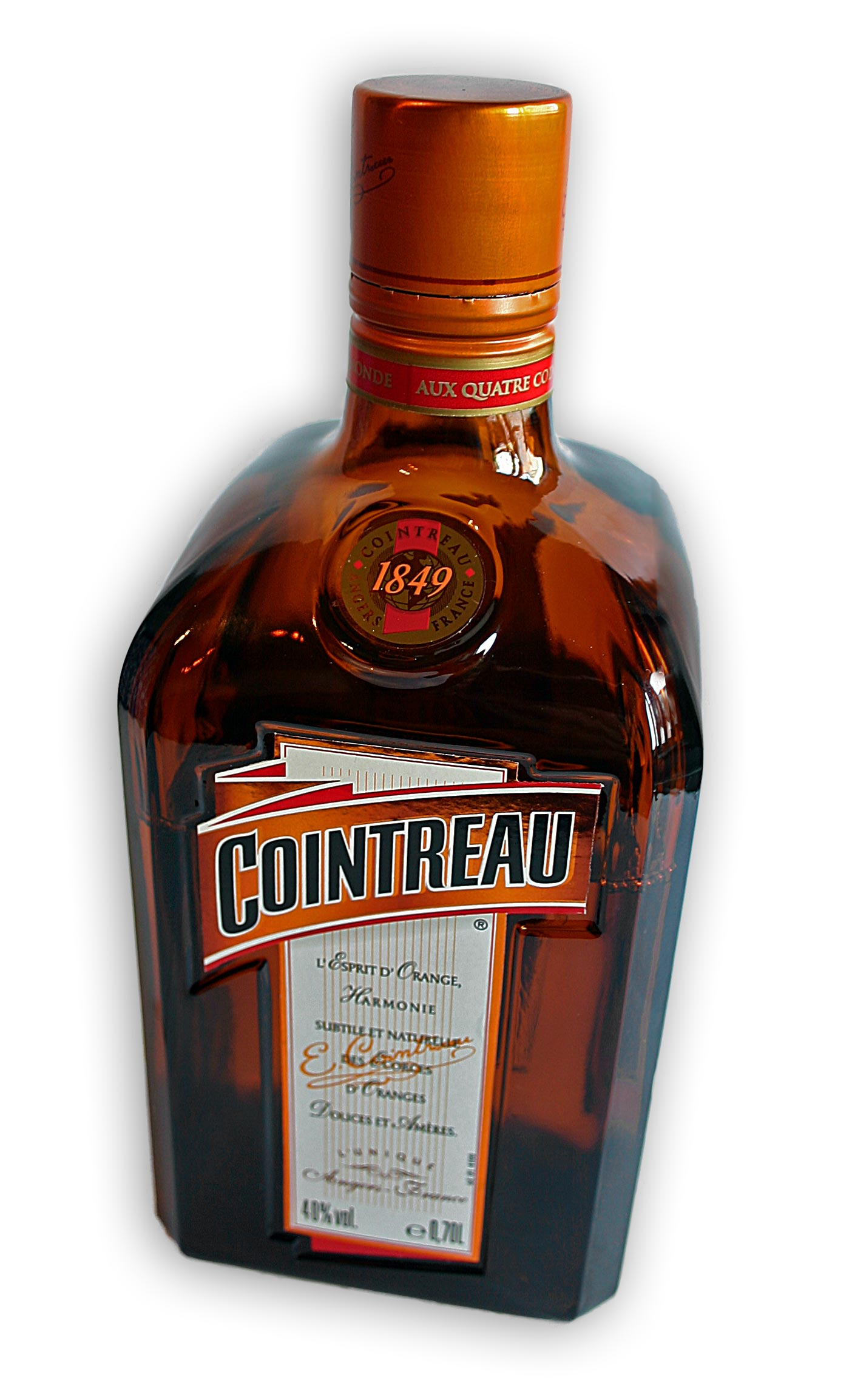
A bottle of Cointreau, a liqueur produced in Saint-Barthélemy-d'Anjou, near Angers, since 1849

The early prosperity of the town was largely due to the nearby quarries of slate, whose abundant use for the roofs of Angers led to its sobriquet as the "Black City". In the mid-19th century, the principal manufactures were goods for sailing ships (sailcloth and rope), linen and hose, sugar, leather, wax, and oil, as well as agricultural products (mainly wheat, wine, and fruit). By the time of the First World War, Cointreau had developed the distillation of liqueurs from the area's fruit to an industrial level. The work for sailing ships was still carried on but steamships had greatly reduced demand. Instead, local companies produced cables, wires, and thread and increased production of footwear, umbrellas, and parasols. The area's vineyards focused on sparkling wine and fruit was increasingly preserved for sale elsewhere. The area had also developed a small-scale textile industry and begun producing machines, as well as commercial-scale production of hemp and flowers.

Present-day Angers provides 45.7% of the Maine-et-Loire job positions. It is the 22nd-largest national job provider and the 3rd-largest one in northwestern France after Nantes and Rennes. Its unemployment rate (13.5% in 2017) is above the national rate. 20.7% of the people working in Angers have graduate or post-graduate qualifications.

Cointreau continues to produce its orange triple-sec liqueur in nearby Saint-Barthélemy-d'Anjou, but many of the other industries have since vanished. Modern Angers produces Scania trucks at Écouflant and computers by Bull, Packard Bell, and NEC. It also supports research labs investigating horticulture and biotechnology. Thanks to its several higher education schools, laboratories, and various offices, Angers is the largest horticultural center in Europe and, as the home of the Community Plant Variety Office, Angers is the hub of the plant breeders' rights system in the European Community. For example, Angers is the leading hydrangeas producer in Europe. The local economy also relies on the presence of many administrative, educational, and health institutions. There are also many small firms, chiefly focused on the agricultural tradition of Maine-et-Loire. Angers also serves as a regional financial center, with many banks and insurance companies (including Afone, CNP Assurances, Crédit Agricole, Fiducial, and Groupama) maintaining their regional offices there.

Angers is an important convention center, with a present convention trade of around €8,000,000. The new convention center slated for 2016 has been cancelled in 2013. The renovation of the previous convention center and the addition of a 400 conference room at the back by the garden should be finished in 2018. The Parc des Expositions, where fairs are currently held, welcomes 600,000 visitors and more than 300 events each year. With its 27,000 m^{2} (290,626 sq ft), it is the biggest structure of its type in northwestern France.

== Health and education ==
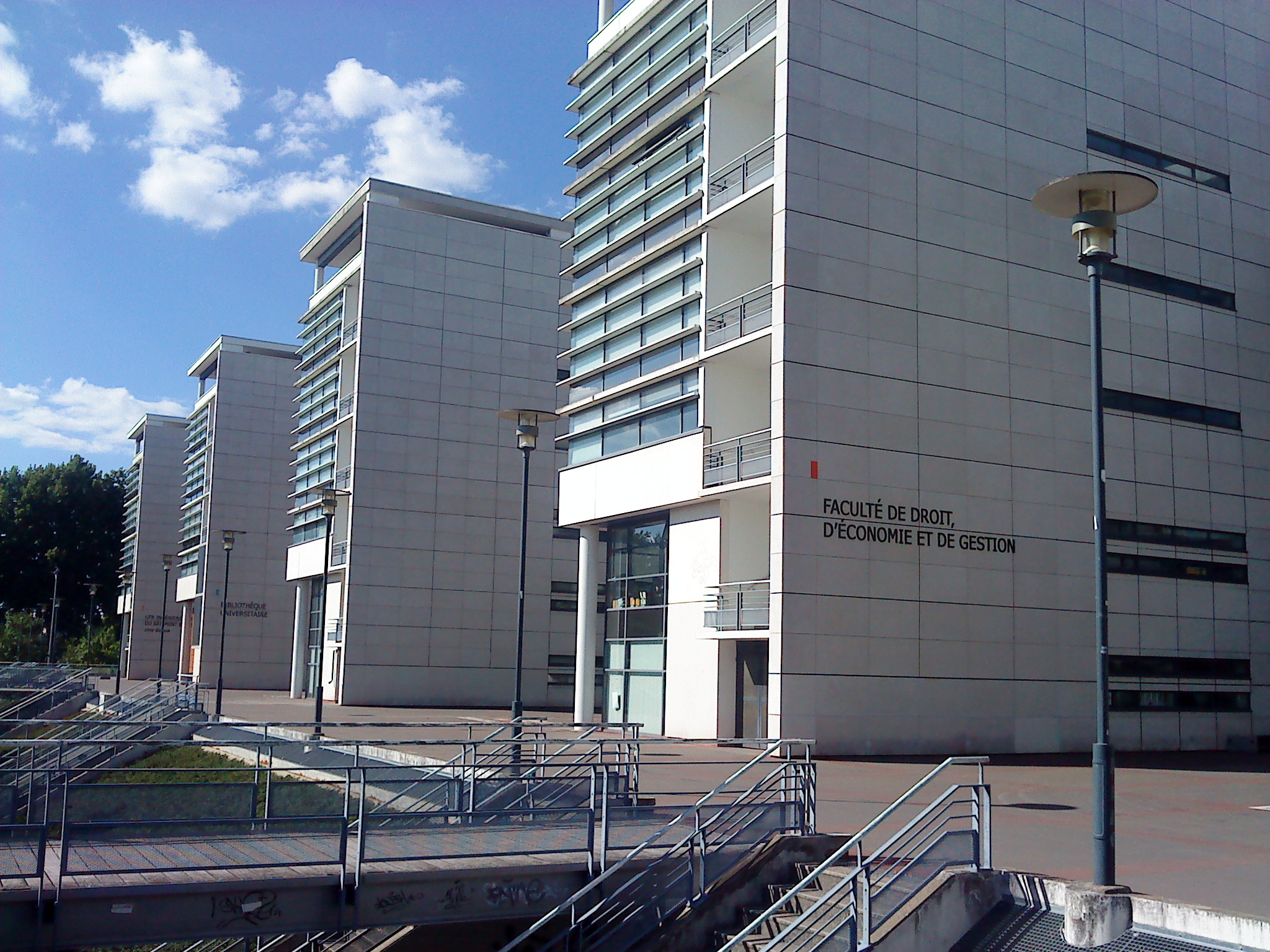
The Faculty of Law and Economics

The Hôtel-Dieu, founded in the 12th century, is one of the oldest hospitals in France. First located in the Hospice Saint-Jean, it moved into new buildings in 1870; it became Centre Hospitalier Universitaire (CHU) in 1966. It has 1,500 beds and around 5,500 people work there. Two private hospitals and a regional center for re-education also exist.

A center of learning, Angers boasts two renowned universities and several specialized institutions, altogether enrolling more than 26,000 students. The Catholic University of the West (Université Catholique de L'Ouest or UCO) is one of five Catholic universities in France. UCO is best known for its International Center for the Study of the French Language (Centre international d'étude de la langue française or CIDEF), which provides college students from around the world with college-level course instruction in the French language, and for its Institute for the Development of Consulting and Business (Institut pour le developpement du conseil et de l'entreprise or IDCE), an important business school which offers undergraduate and graduate (MBA) degrees in International Business and Consulting. The town is also home to a state university, the University of Angers, best university in France in 2015 for success rates.

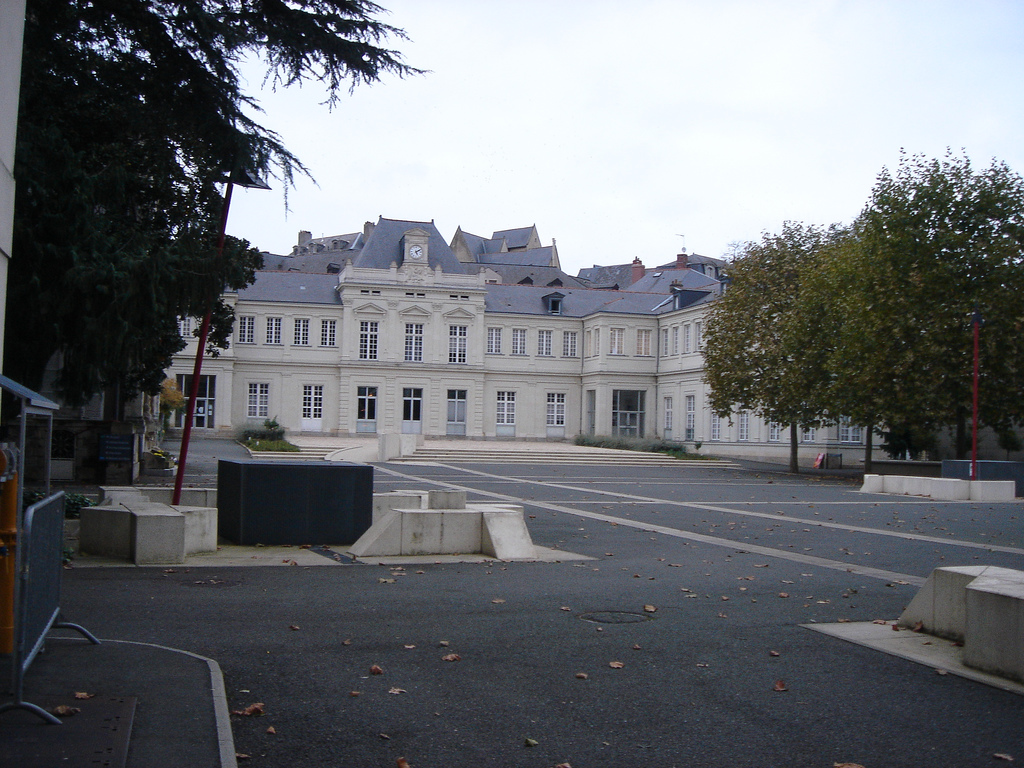
Arts et Métiers ParisTech

Angers is also home to engineering graduate schools, such as the Arts et Métiers ParisTech, top school in mechanical and industrial engineering and the ESEO, an engineering school in electronics and computer science and ESAIP, an engineering school in risk management and environment. Its education and research institutes are the driving force behind the city's science and technology industries. Angers's other educational institutions include lycées, training colleges, and a school of fine art.

Another Angers's Business School is ESSCA (École Supérieure des Sciences Commerciales d'Angers). Formerly part of the UCO, the school's Master's program is of a duration of five years. ESSCA recruits students after the Baccalaureat.

In addition to French schools and universities, an American university, St. Edward's University, has a new expanding campus in Angers. St. Edward's University is a diverse, Catholic liberal arts institution from Austin, Texas. The university has a partnership with UCO, and offers a variety of courses of undergraduate level and professional training.

== Transport ==
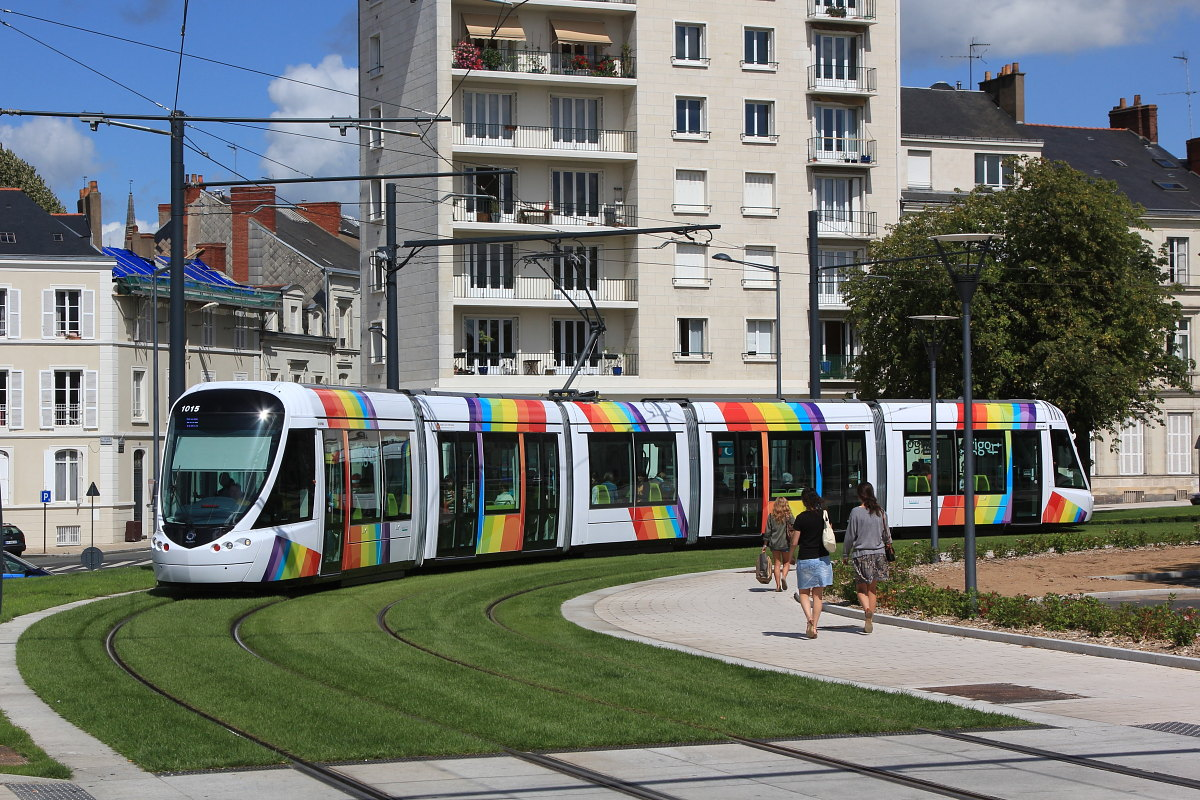
A tram approaching "Les Gares" stop

Angers is situated on the crossroads of three highways, the A11, to Paris and Nantes, the A87 to La Roche-sur-Yon and the A85 to Tours and Lyon. National roads connect the city with Rennes, Caen and Laval.

Before the construction of bypasses during the 2000s, the A11 crossed the city center, following the river Maine, and passed just below the castle. Causing air pollution and noise and disfiguring the Maine quays, the portions of the former highway which are still in place should be redeveloped in the coming years.

Angers inaugurated the new Irigo tram system on 25 June 2011. The tramway consists of one 12 km (7.46 mi) line with 25 stops. The line runs from Avrillé-Ardenne in the north to Angers-Roseraie in the south, passing by the center and the train station. Service is provided by Keolis using 17 Alstom Citadis trams. The system uses partial ground-level power supply, which avoids aerial wires and preserves the historical character of the city center. A second line is scheduled for 2018–2022. Besides the tram, Irigo also organizes the bus network in Angers consisting of 13 urban lines and 12 suburban lines.

The bus station, situated outside the Angers Saint-Laud train station, is a hub for the departmental bus network (Anjoubus) and is also served by international bus companies.

Angers is on both the Nantes-Paris and Nantes-Lyon railways. The city has several train stations, all originally built in the 19th century. Some are still in use; others are closed or reserved for freight. The main station, Angers Saint-Laud, is on a TGV line and has direct TGV services to Paris (1 hour 30 minutes), Lyon (3 hours 45 minutes), Strasbourg (4 hours 35 minutes), and Lille (3 hours 25 minutes), as well as Avignon, Marseille and Montpellier. Regional trains go to Cholet, Saumur, Tours, Blois, Nevers and Bourges.

The nearest airport is Angers - Loire Airport, which replaced in 1998 an older airport near the Saint-Aubin island. The airport is located in the commune of Marcé, 20 kilometers (12 miles) from Angers and close to the A11 and the A85. It can receive 50,000 passengers per year.

== Culture ==
=== Main sights ===
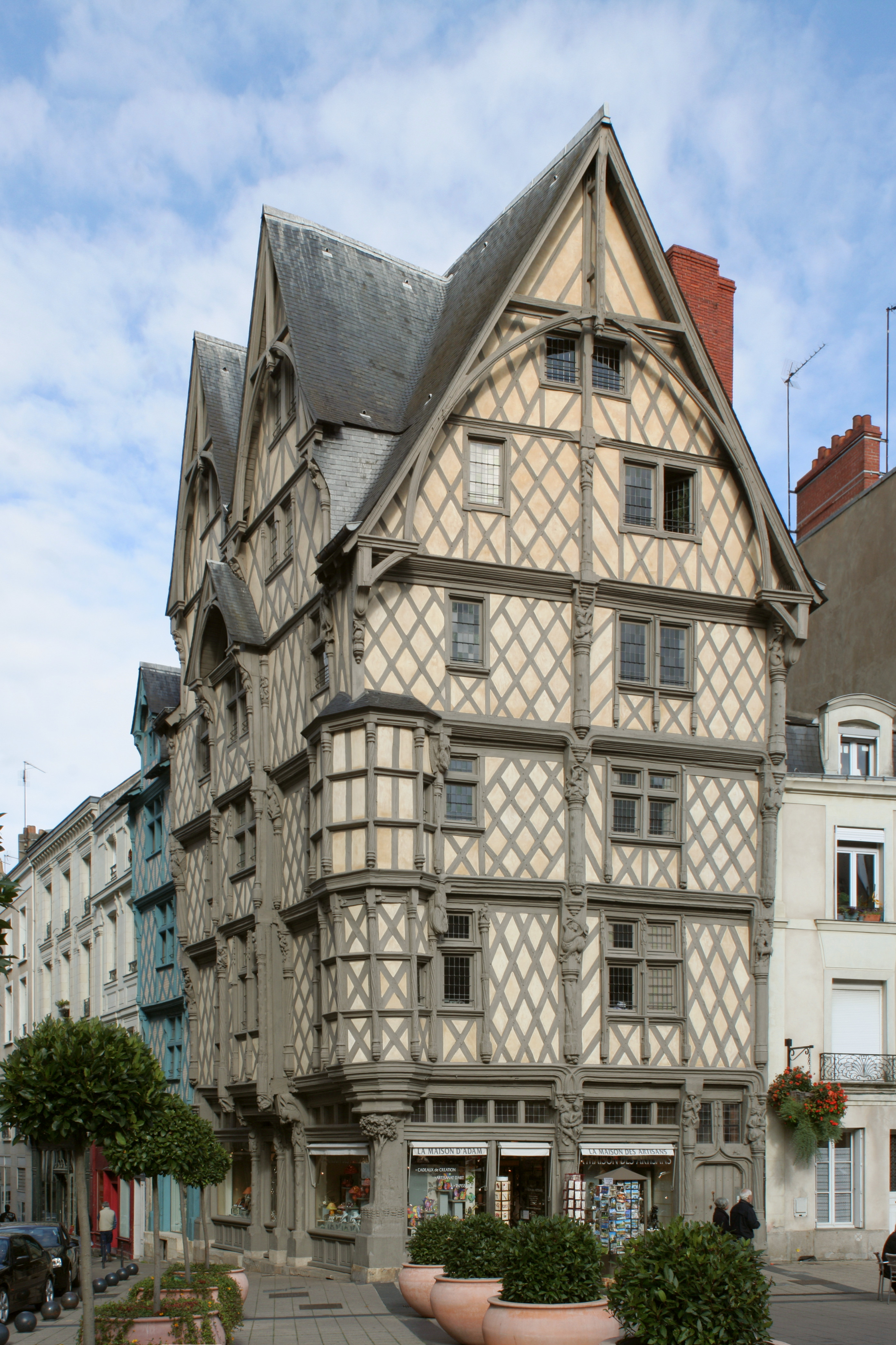
The Maison d'Adam (Adam's House) was built around 1500

The Château d'Angers, built on a schist promontory, dominates the river Maine and the old town. Its site has been occupied since antiquity; the castle itself was built between 1230 and 1240 by Louis IX of France. The massive walls are about one kilometer long and punctuated by 17 towers; they were built with horizontal slices of tuff and schist, giving it strength and an original striped look. During the 15th century, a chapel and the Châtelet were added in the courtyard.

The Maison d'Adam ("Adam's House"), located behind the cathedral, is an excellent example of the half-timbered houses which were built during the Middle Ages. Many similar houses, although smaller, are also visible along the streets around the castle. The city also displays several Renaissance and classical hôtels particuliers, the most renowned being the Logis Pincé from the 16th century. The Maison bleue ("Blue House"), built in 1927, is an Art Deco masterpiece. The former seat of the French Aviation Company (Compagnie française d'Aviation) was built in 1938 and abandoned during the Second World War. Totally refurbished in 2004, it is now a testimony to 1930s architecture.

The Angers Cathedral is a major landmark in the cityscape, with its two spires culminating at 75 meters (246 ft). The construction of the current building started during the 12th century on the remains of an older sanctuary. The original structure, romanesque, received gothic columns and vaults in the middle of the 12th century, giving birth to the Angevin gothic, a style that quickly spread in Western France and the Angevin possessions in Italy. Sculptures and architectural details were added to the façade during the 16th century. The twin spires were built in 1518 and 1523. The neighbouring Palais du Tau, the former episcopal palace, dates from the 12th century.

The skyline is also marked by the Tour Saint-Aubin. Completed in 1170, it was the bell-tower of an abbey closed during the French Revolution and destroyed in 1810. Elaborately sculptured 11th and 12th century arcades also survive in the courtyard of the Prefecture. Another abbey, the Abbaye Toussaint, founded during the 13th century, was also partially pulled down and only the church and parts of the cloister are still visible. On the southern limits of the commune, close to the Maine, stands the Couvent de la Baumette, founded during the 15th century by René of Anjou.

La Doutre, an old quarter located on the western bank of the Maine and facing the castle, contains two major medieval sites, the former Abbaye du Ronceray, built during the 11th and 12th century, and the Hôpital Saint-Jean, founded by Henry II of England and used as the city hospital until 1870.

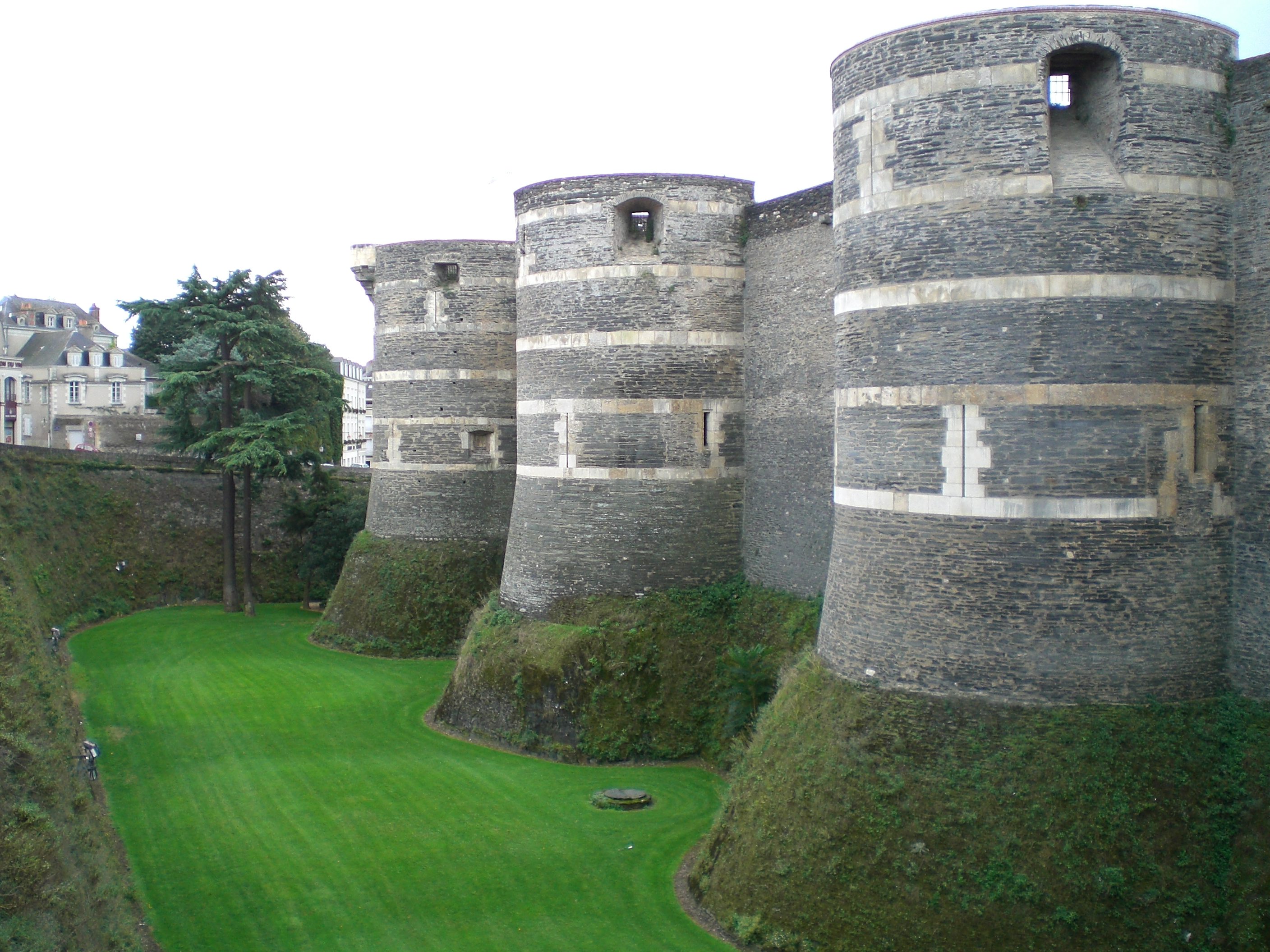
The distinctive striped towers of the castle

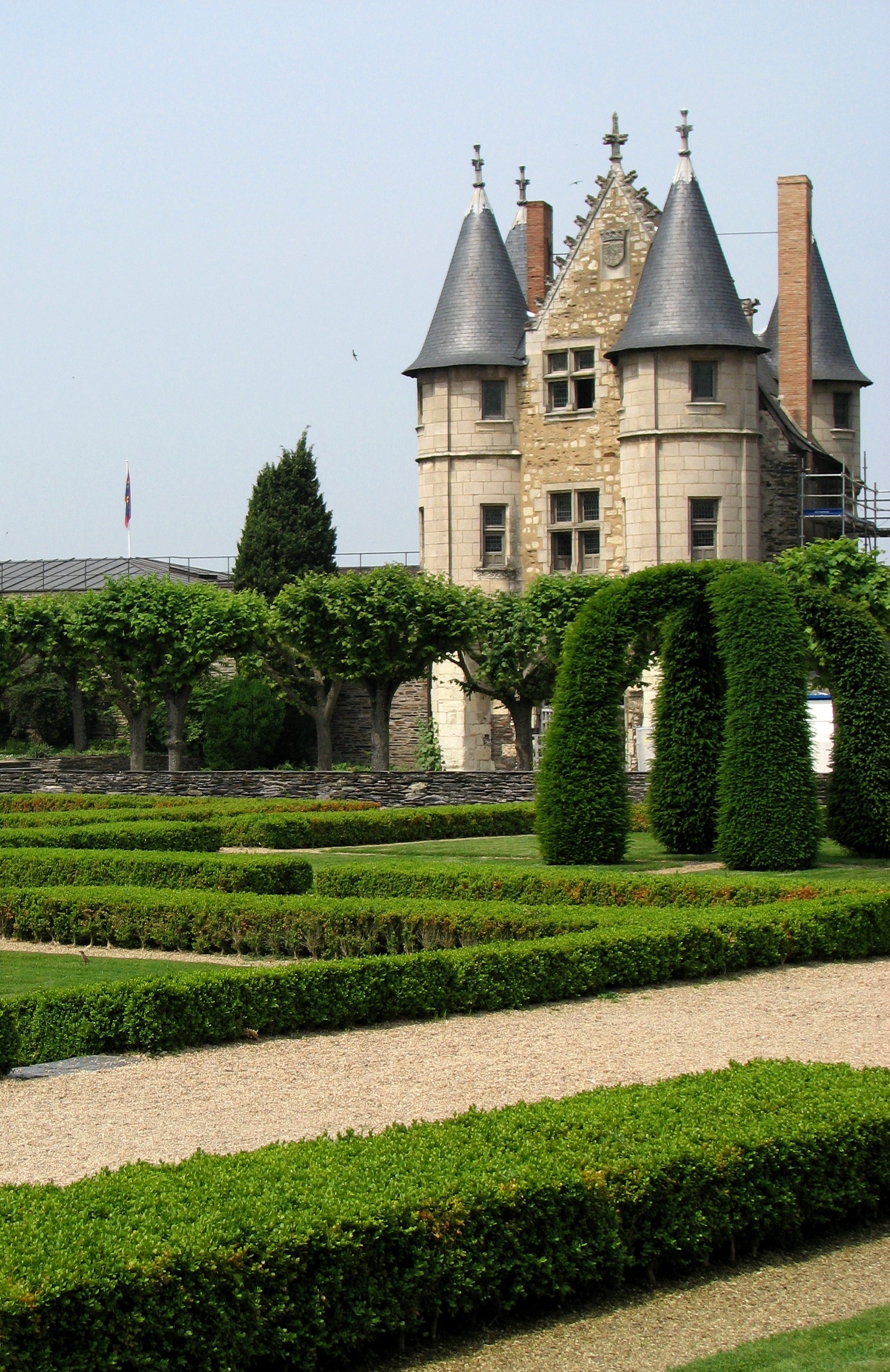
The Châtelet in the castle

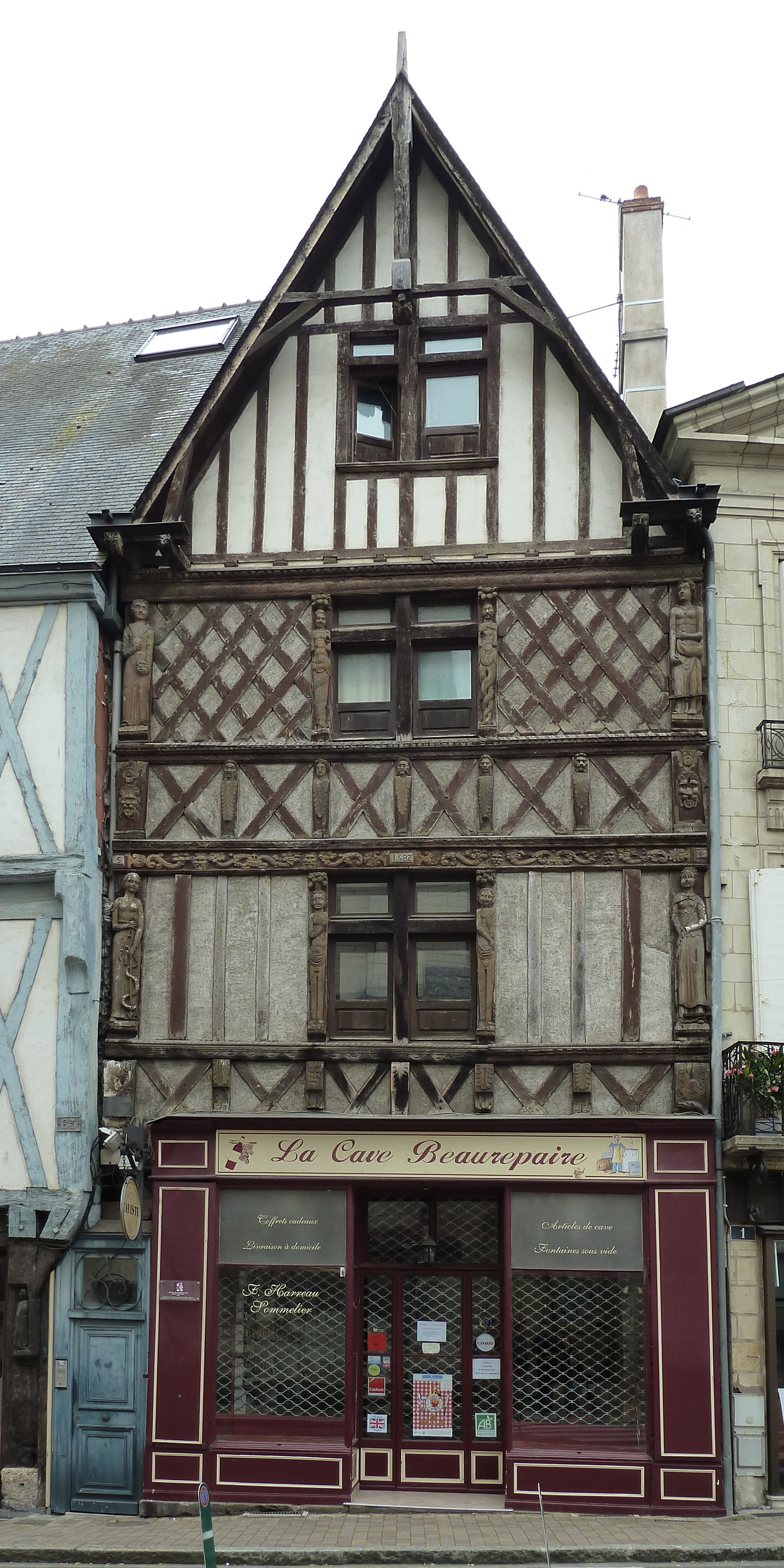
House Poisson

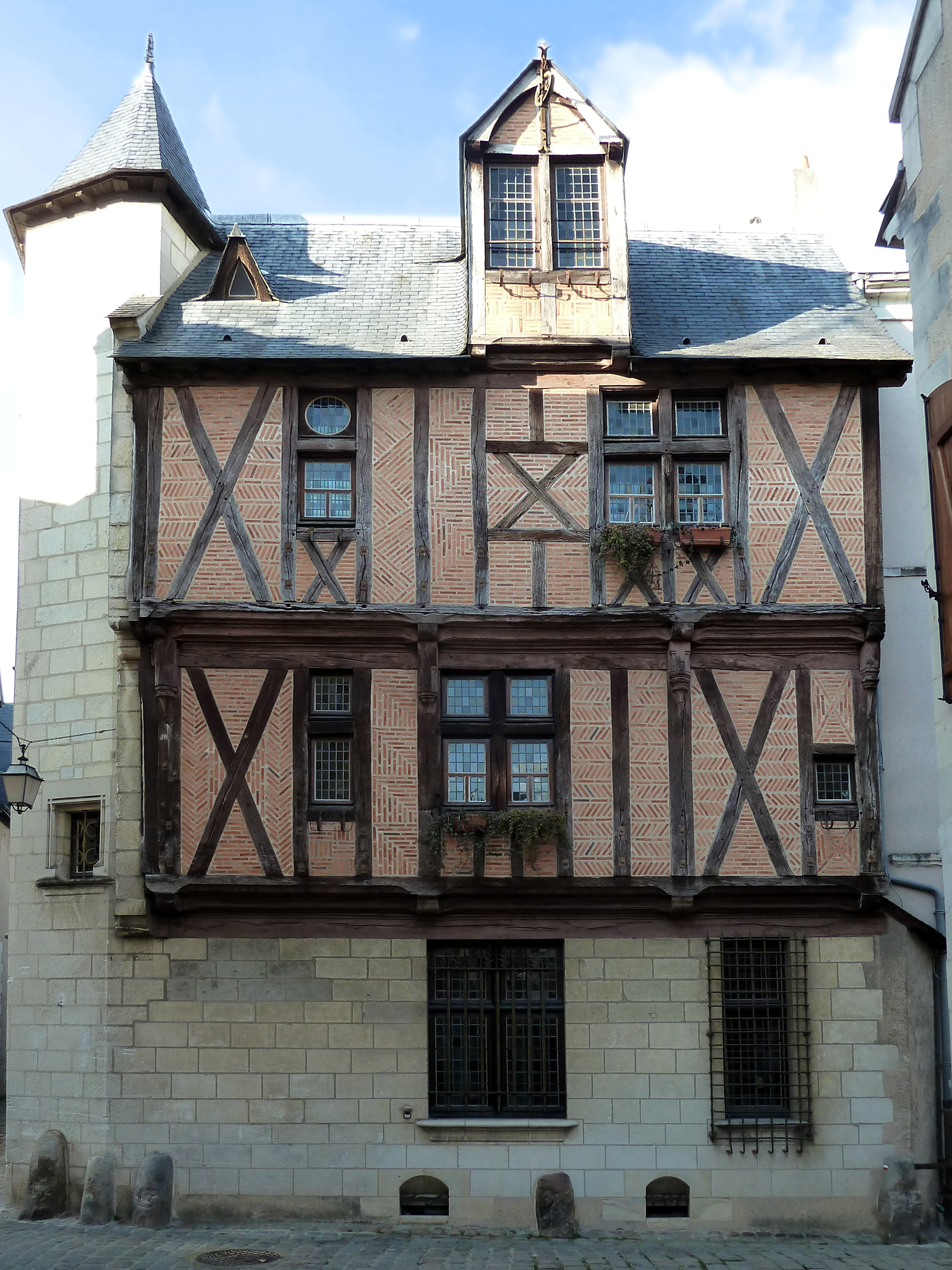
Façade of House of Croissant

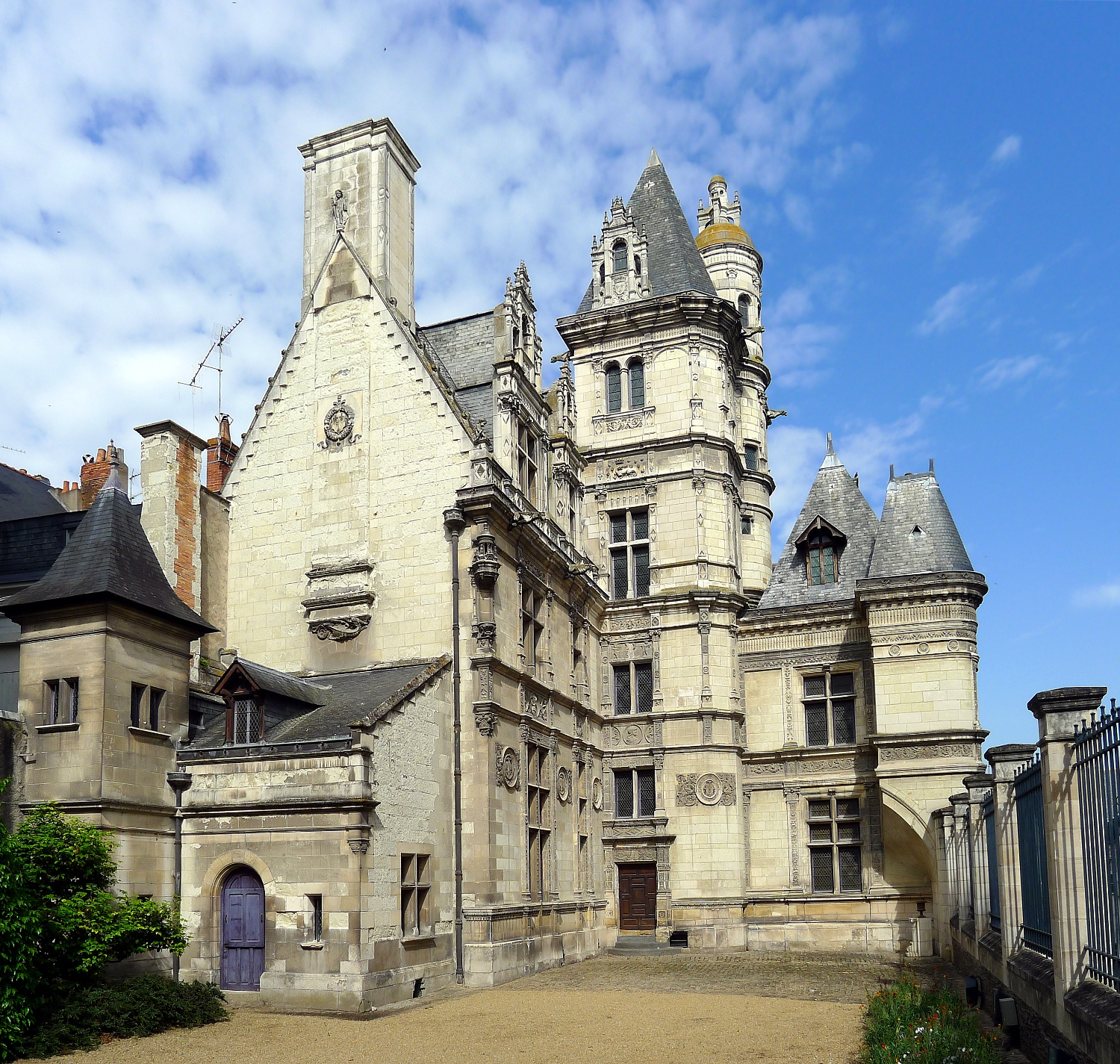
Logis Pincé

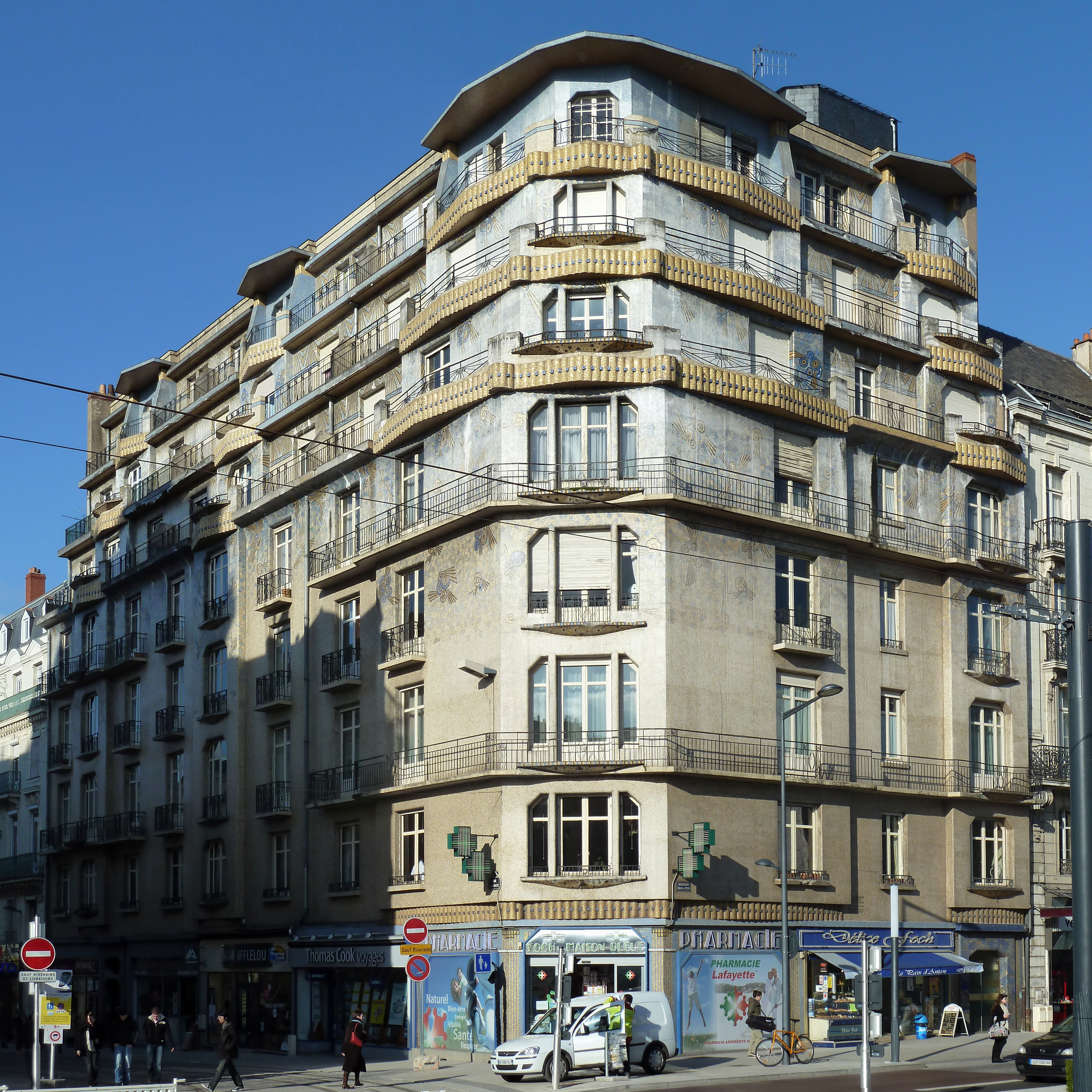
The "Blue House"

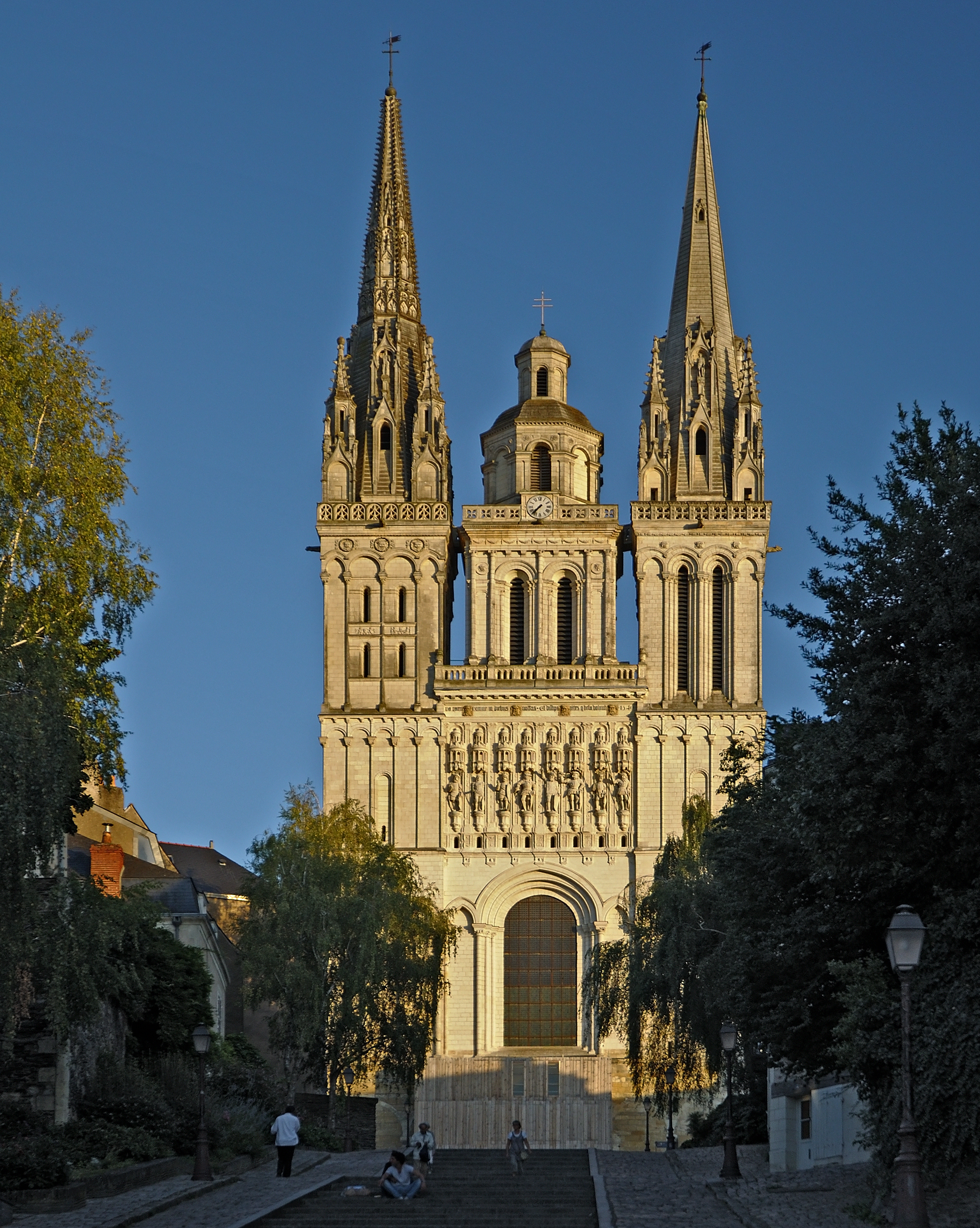
The cathedral

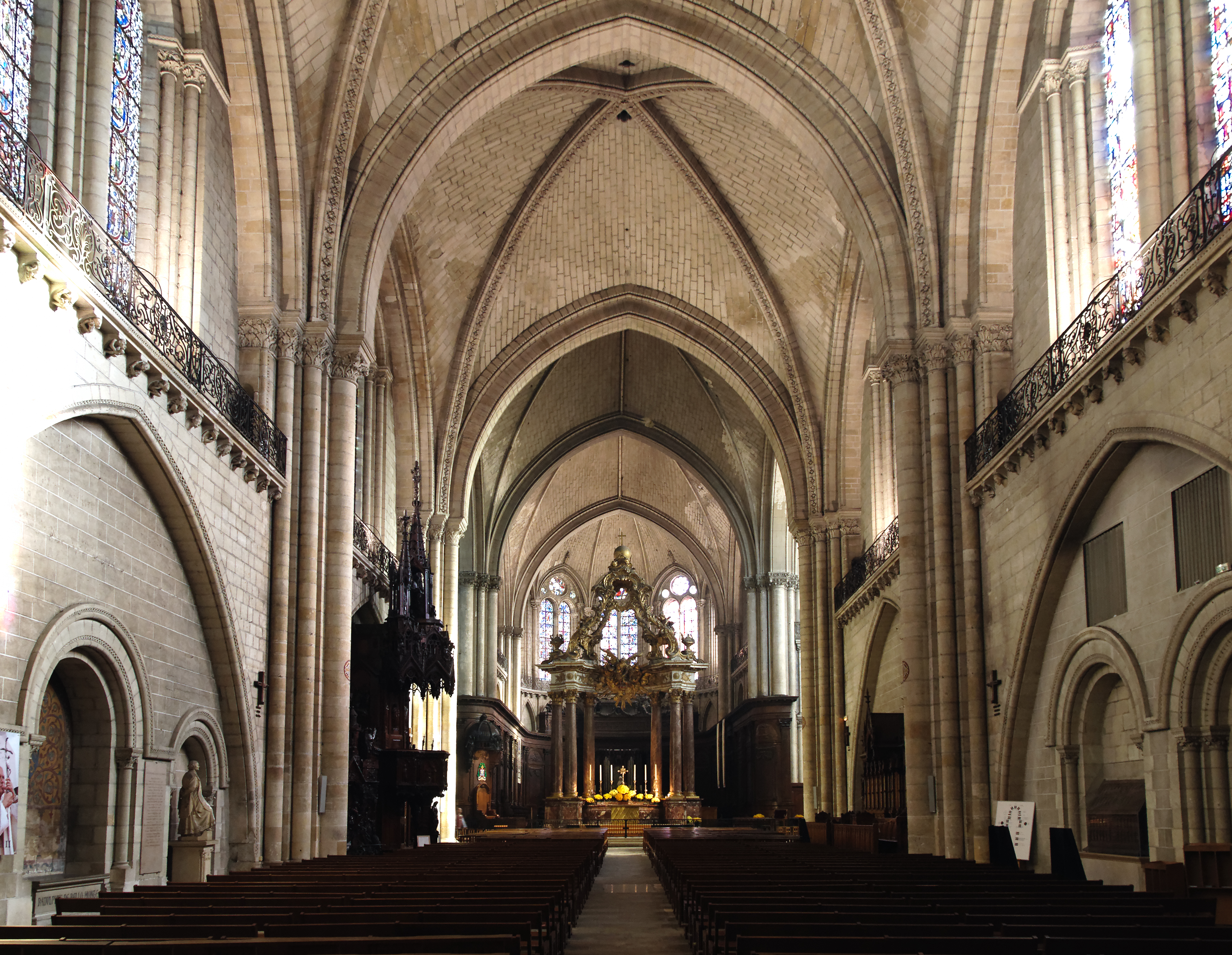
Inside the cathedral

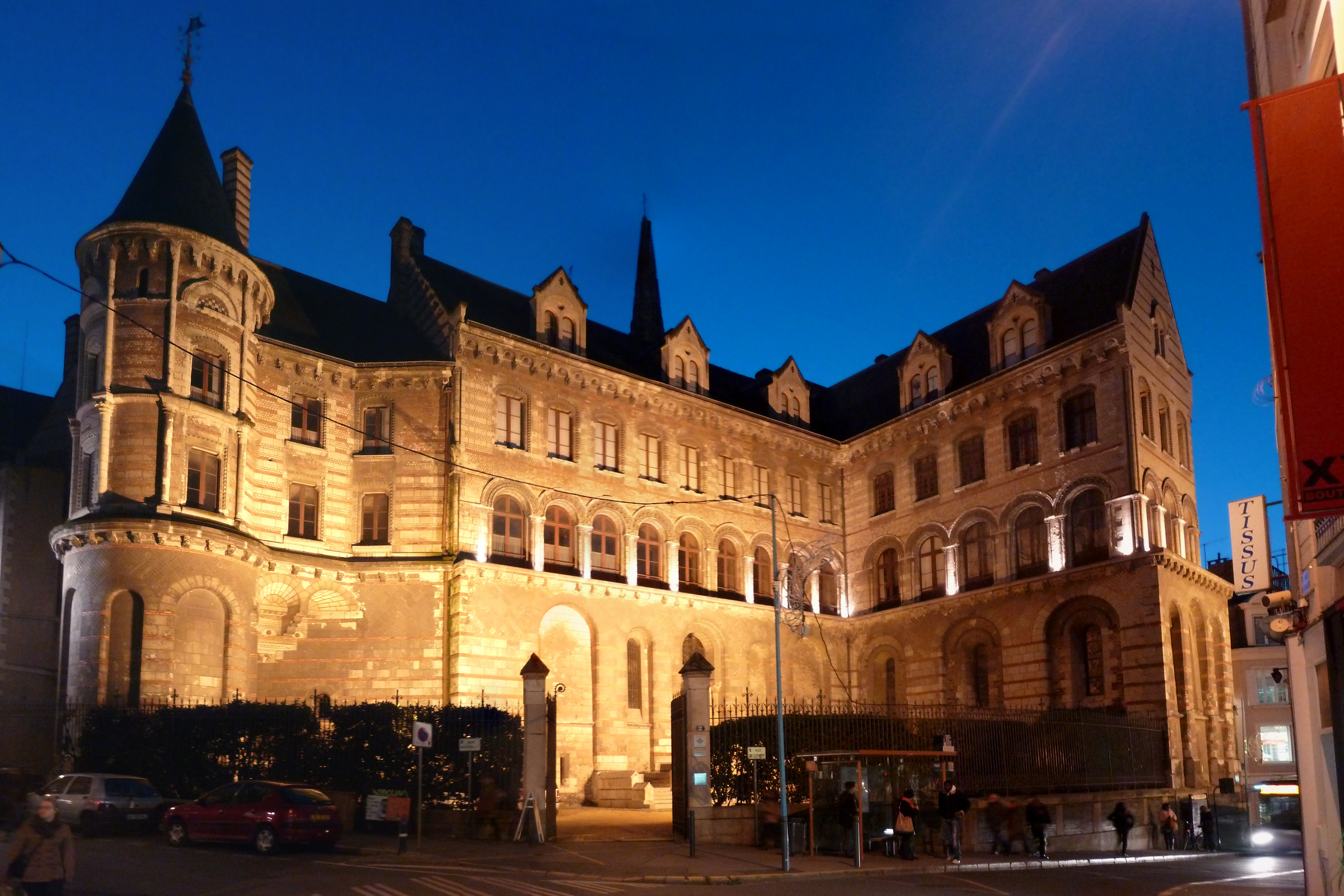
Palace of Tau

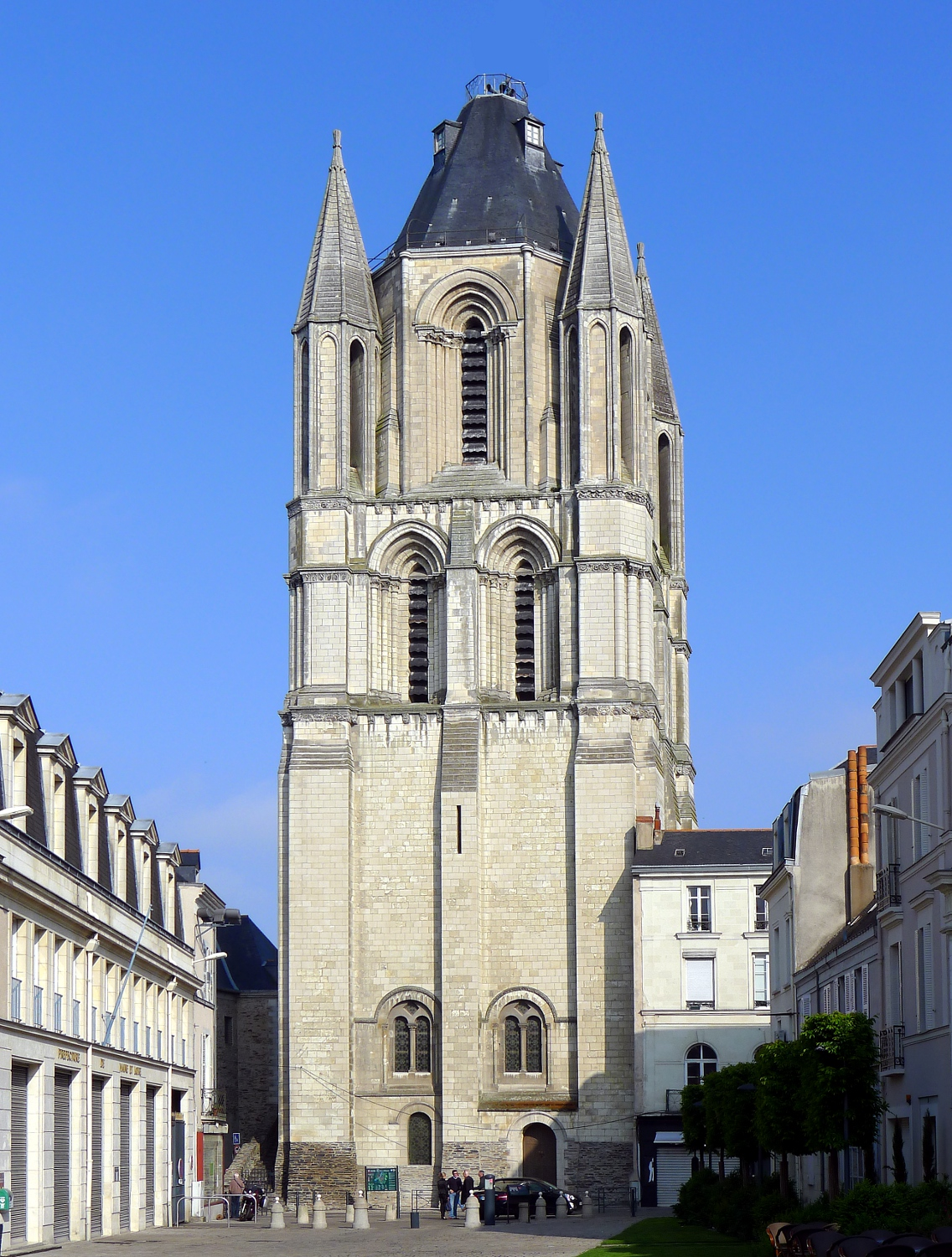
Tower of Saint-Aubin

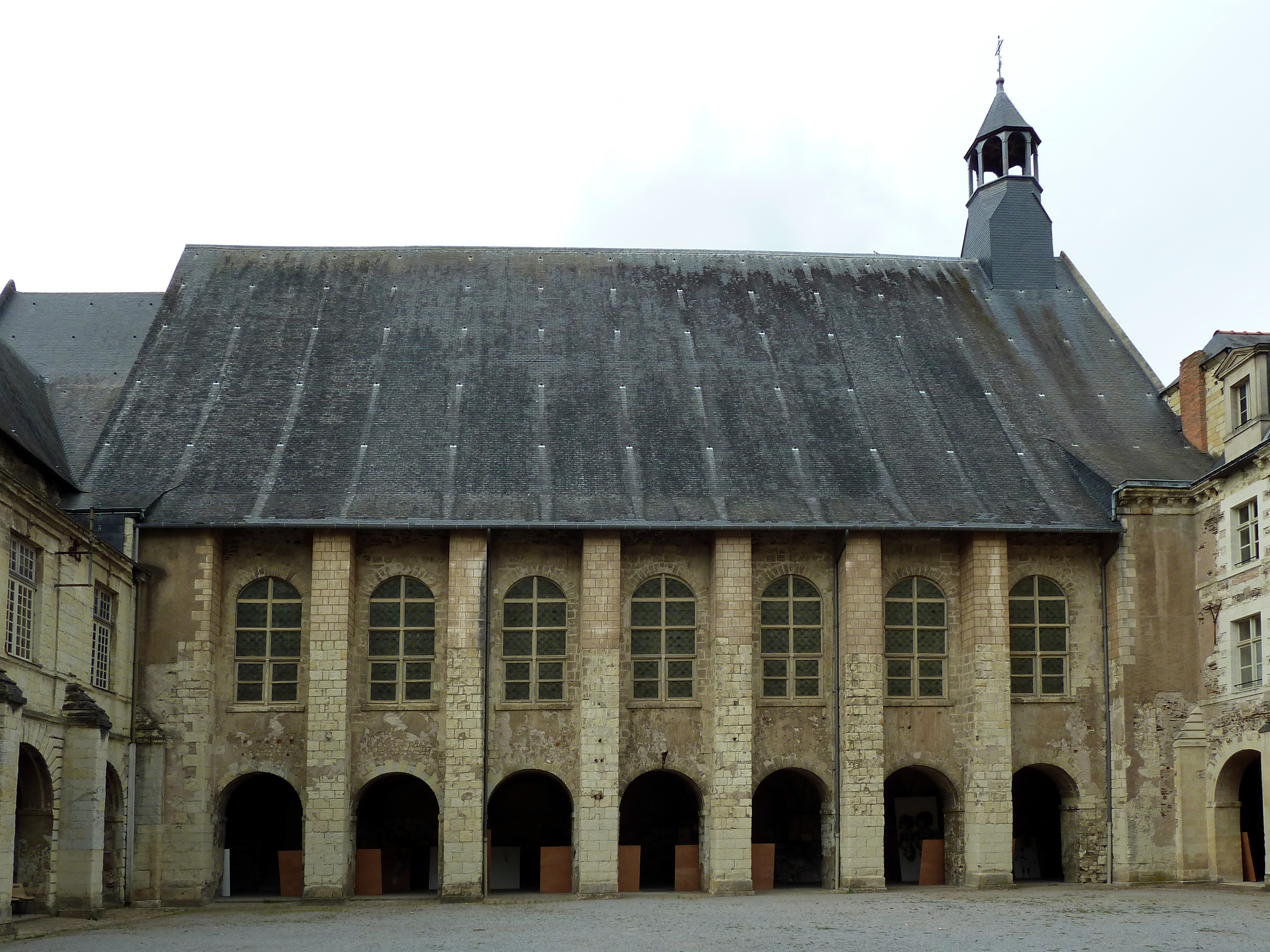
Abbey of Ronceray

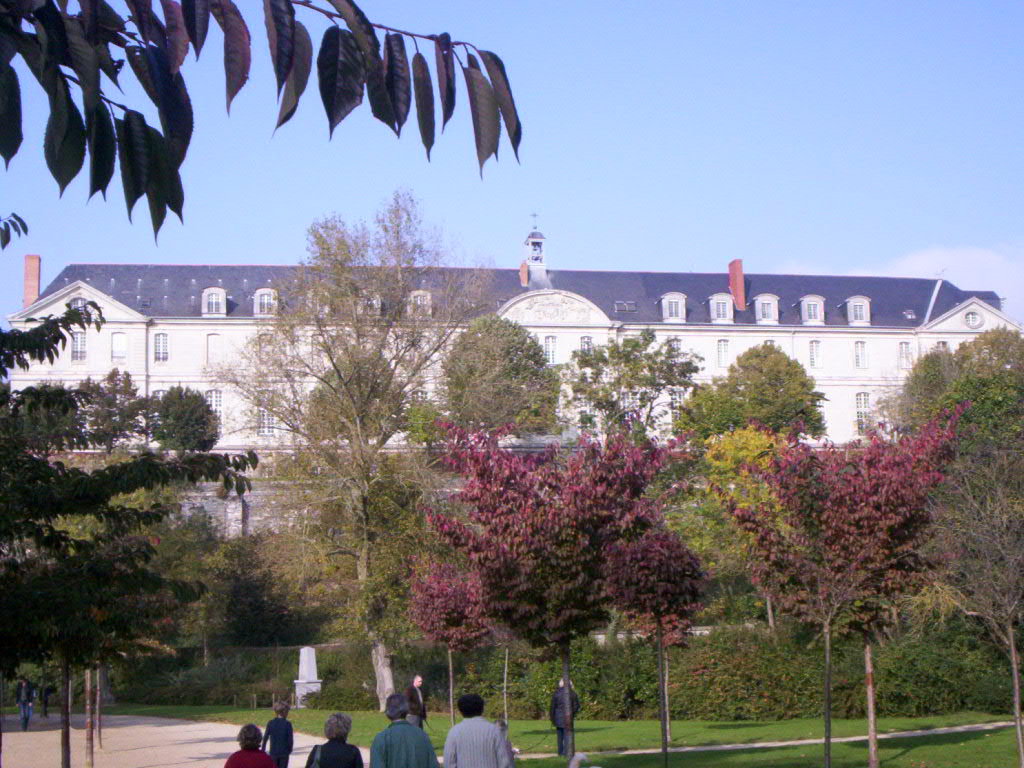
Abbey of Saint Nicholas (Mother-House of Good Shepherd Sisters)

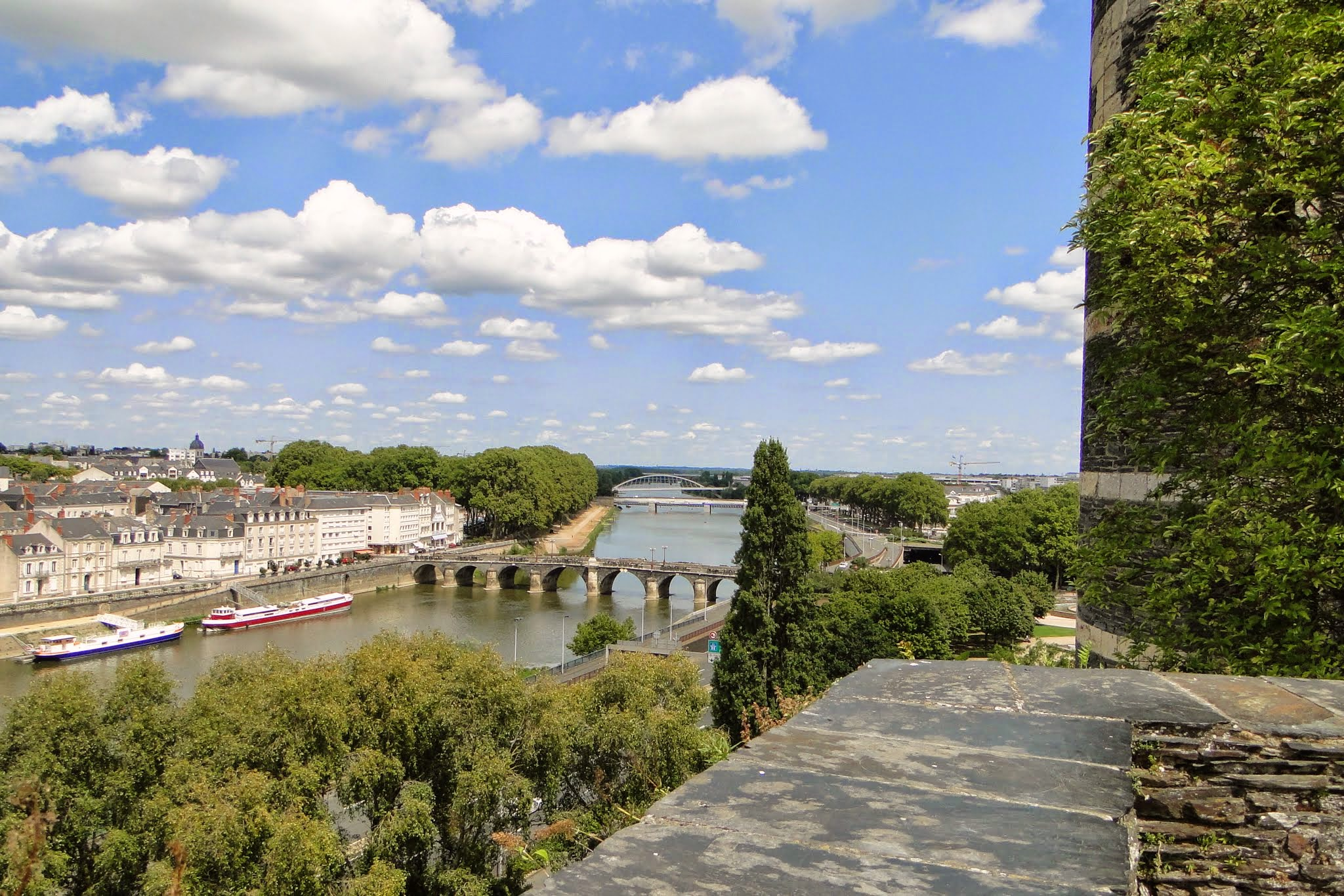
The bridges over Maine (view from the Angers Castle)

=== Museums ===
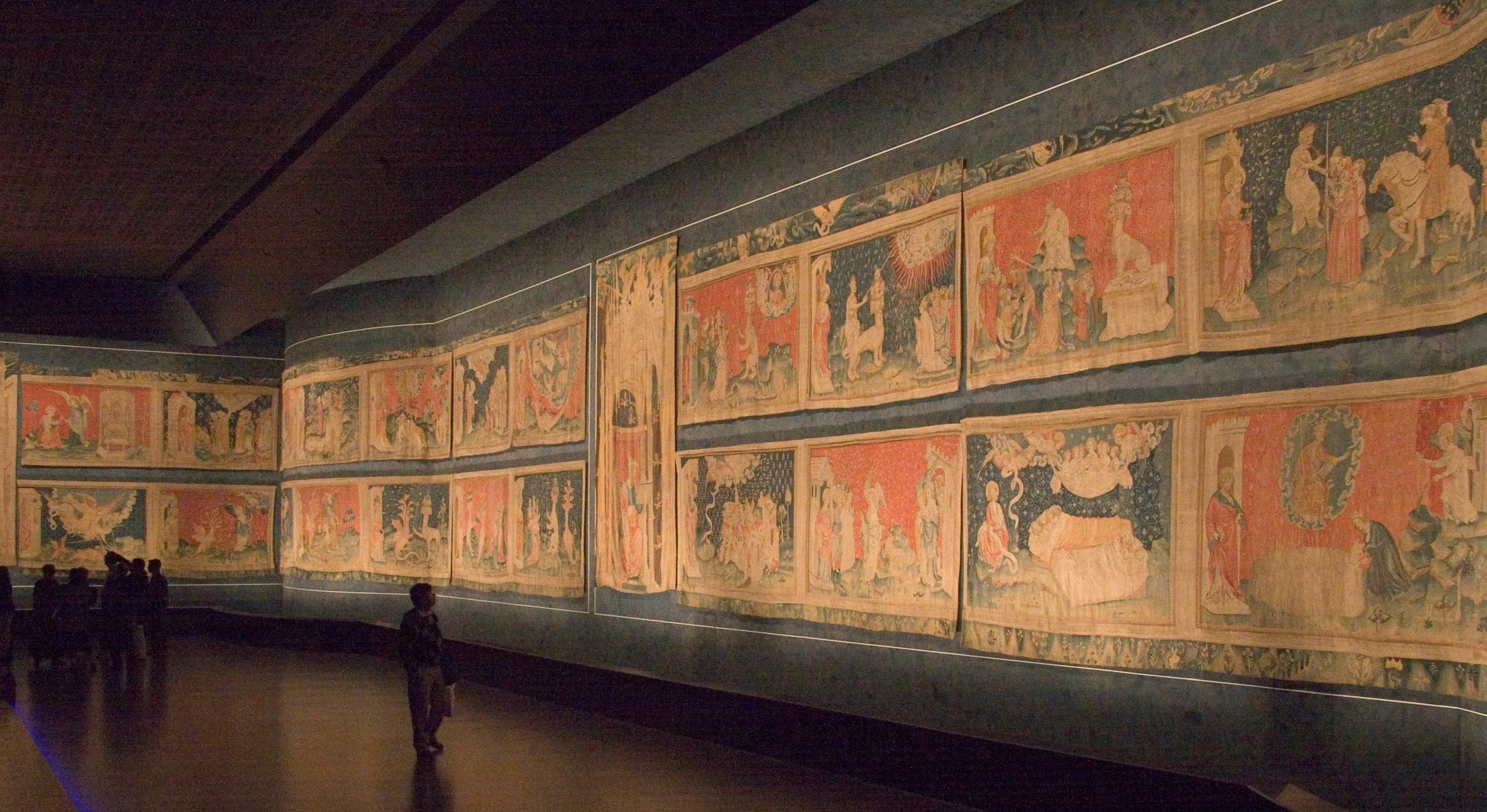
The Apocalypse Tapestry

The Musée des Beaux-Arts d'Angers, located in the Renaissance Logis Barrault, displays a collection of paintings and sculptures dating from the 14th century to today. It is particularly renowned for its 18th-century paintings, including works by Jean-Baptiste Greuze, Van Loo, Antoine Watteau, Jean-Honoré Fragonard, and Jean Siméon Chardin. The museum also contains a graphic design studio, a gallery devoted to the history of Angers and a temporary exhibition gallery. The institution has an annexe at the château in Villevêque, a village located several kilometers north of the city.

Inside the castle, a special gallery displays the Apocalypse Tapestry, ordered by Louis I of Naples at the end of the 14th century. It is more than 140 meters (460 ft) long, the largest medieval tapestry in the world. Inspired by manuscript miniatures, the successive scenes, designed by Jean Bondol, illustrate the Apocalypse of St John.

Located inside the old Hôpital Saint-Jean, the Musée Jean-Lurçat et de la tapisserie contemporaine displays tapestries dating from the 19th and 20th centuries. The museum is dedicated to Jean Lurçat, an artist noted for his role in the revival of contemporary tapestry, and notably exhibits his "Chant du Monde", a modern echo to the Apocalypse Tapestry made after the bombing of Hiroshima.

The Muséum d'histoire naturelle d'Angers has been located in the 1521 Hôtel Demarie-Valentin since 1885. It exhibits a large collection of mounted animals and fossils, divided in three departments, one for zoology, one for botany and the last one for paleontology and geology.

The Logis Pincé, constructed during the Renaissance, is the home of the museum of the same name. It displays Egyptian, Greek, Roman, and Etruscan antiquities as well as Chinese and Japanese artifacts.

Located in the Abbaye Toussaint, the Galerie David d'Angers gathers sculptures, reliefs, and medallions by David d'Angers, a 19th-century sculptor born in the city. The gallery also owns the preparatory works for the Panthéon of Paris pediment.

Angers also enjoys a Maison de l'Architecture, which organizes various exhibitions and workshops, as well as several temporary exhibition galleries distributed in the city center. Outside the commune limits are also an aviation museum and a museum of communications.

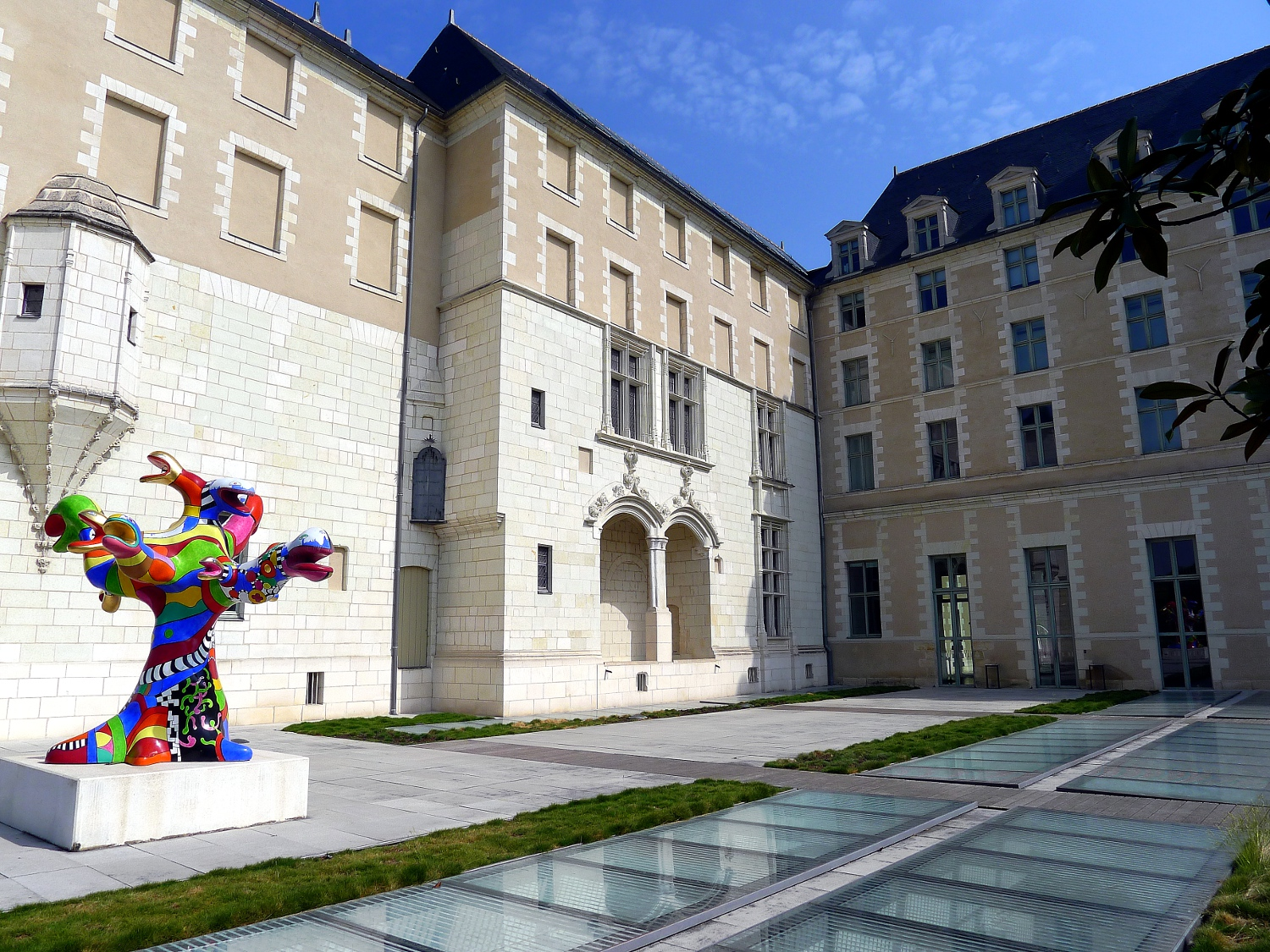
The Musée des Beaux-Arts

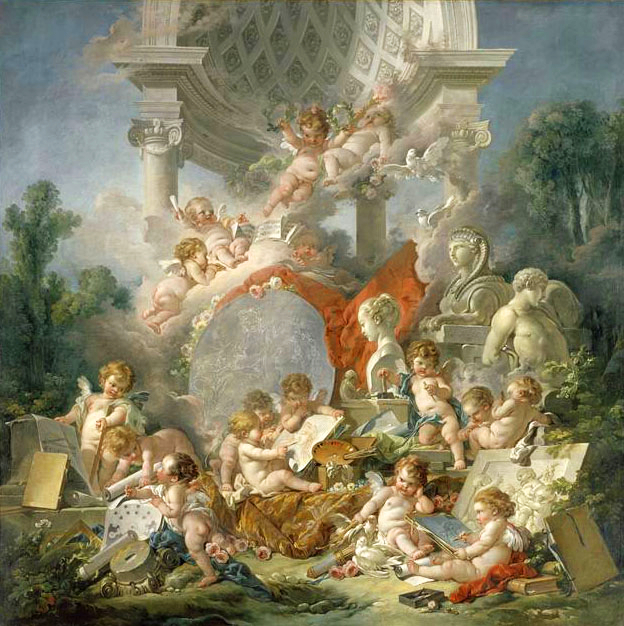
Les Génies des Arts by François Boucher, at the Musée des Beaux-Arts

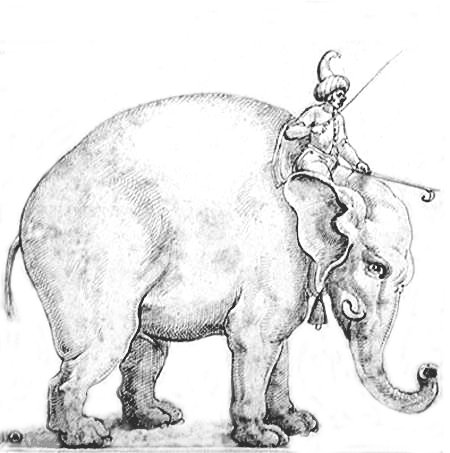
Italian drawing, 17th century, at the Musée des Beaux-Arts

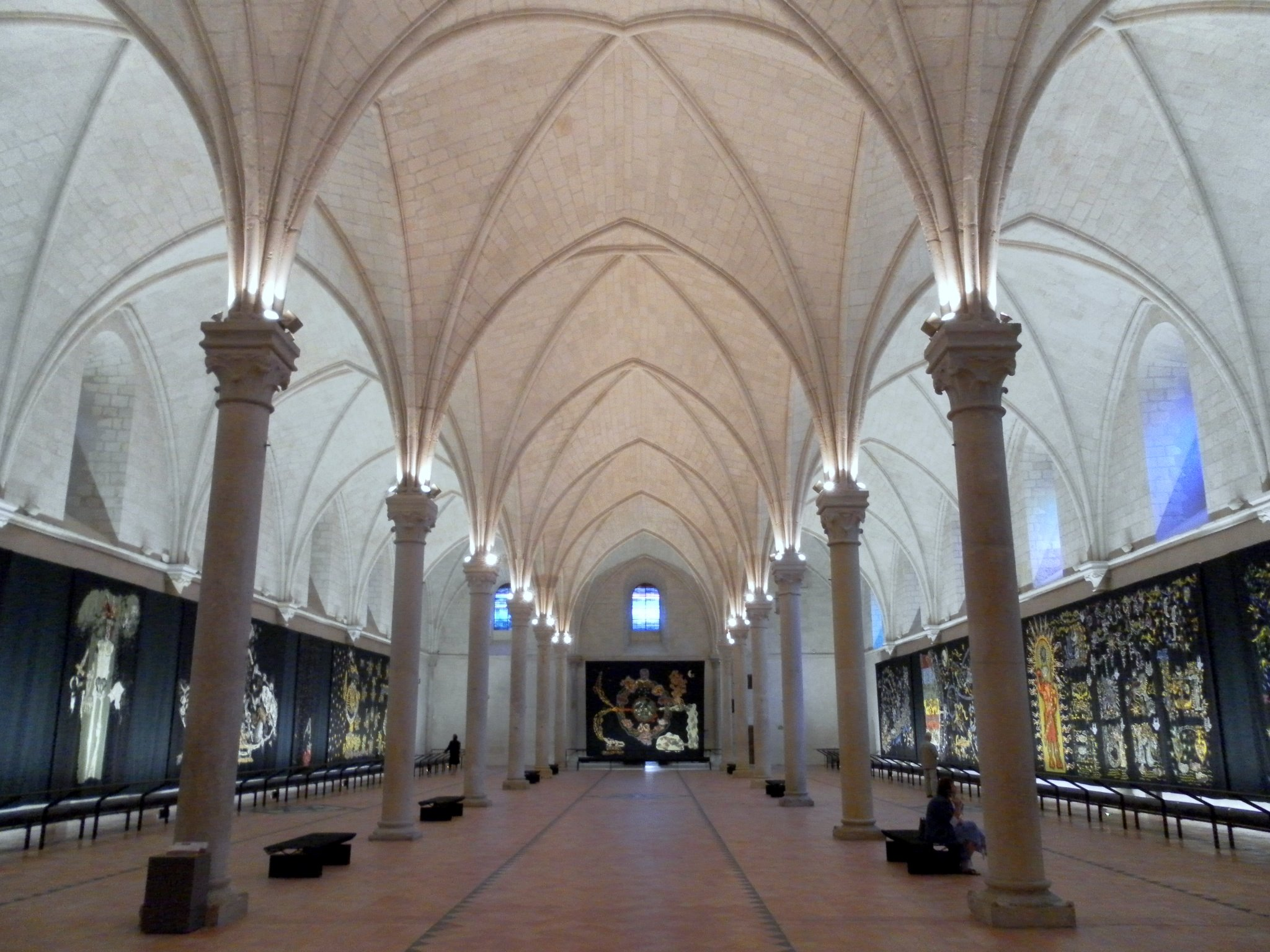
Musée Jean-Lurçat

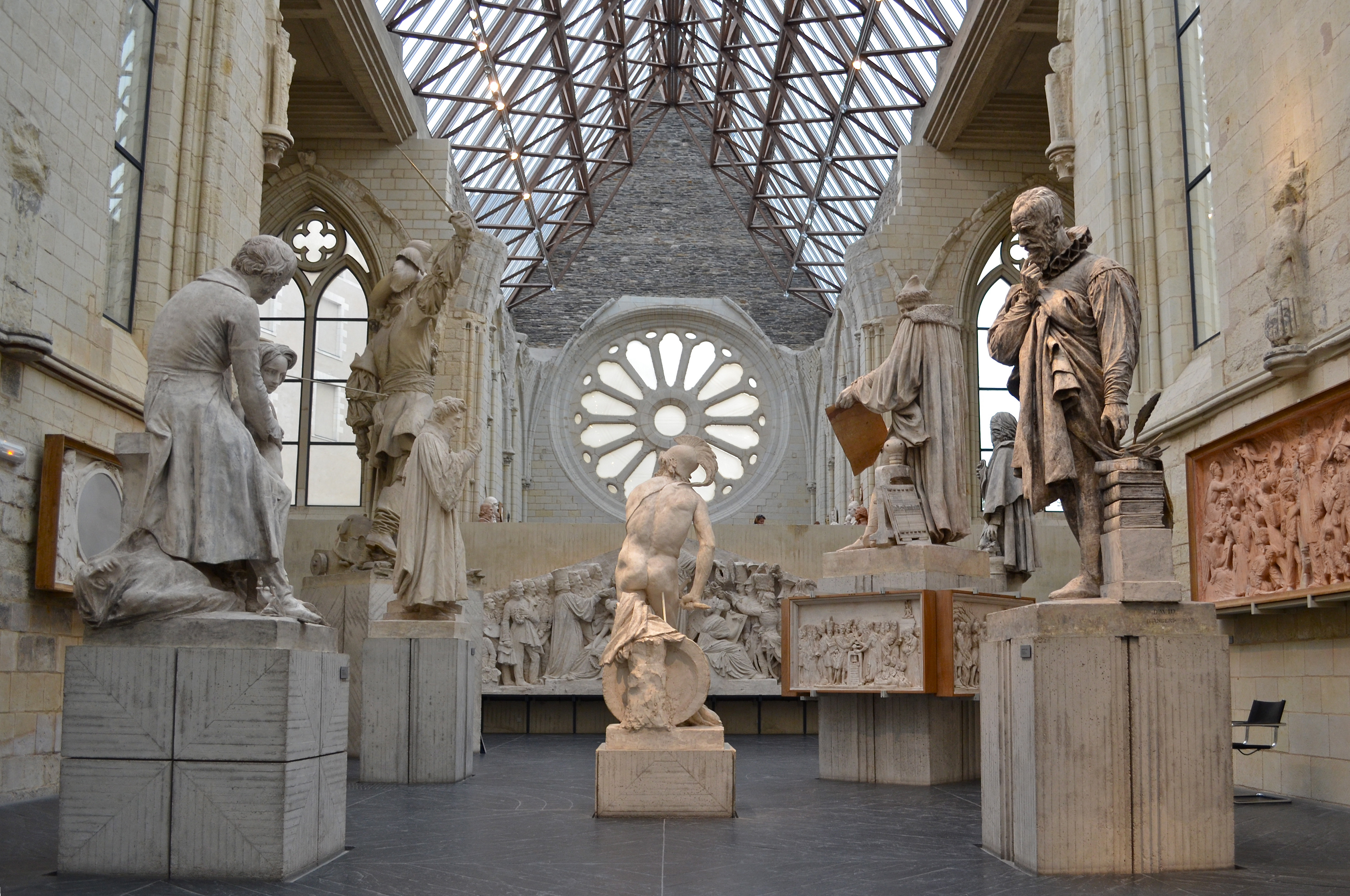
Galerie David d'Angers

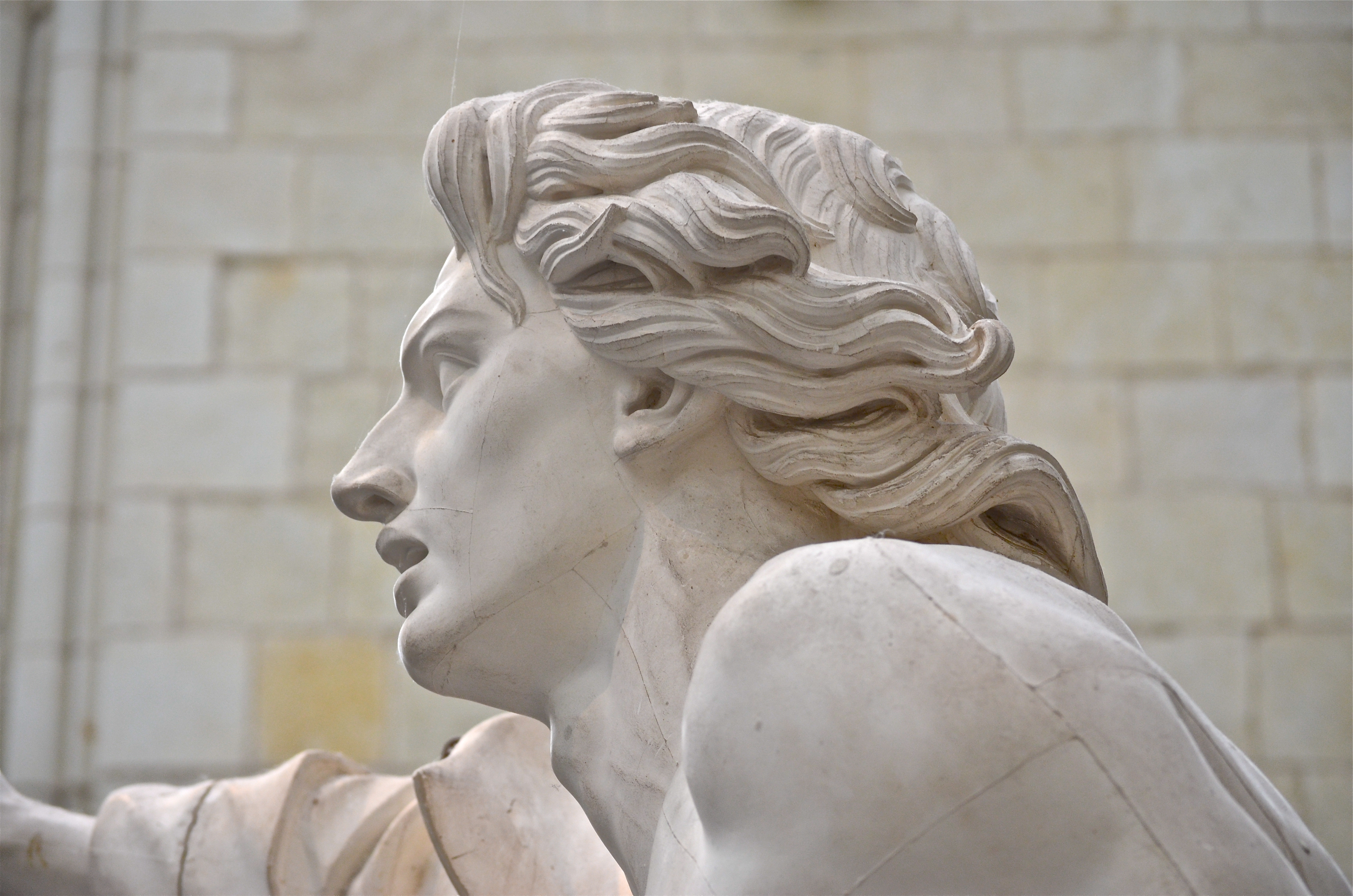
Galerie David d'Angers

=== Entertainment and performing arts ===
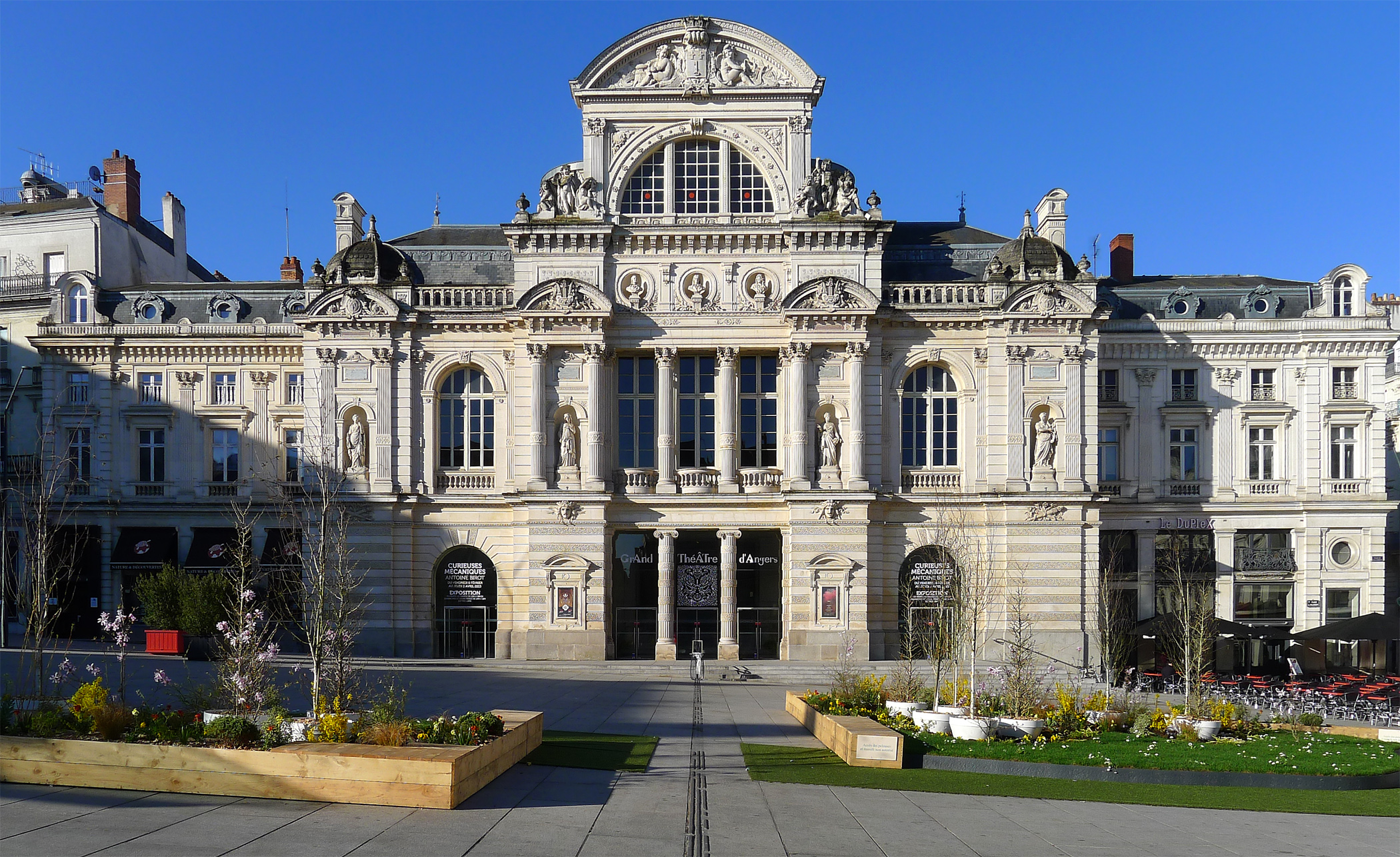
The Grand Théâtre

The Grand Théâtre, dominating the Place du Ralliement, was first built in 1791, but destroyed by a fire in 1853. The existing building was completed in 1871 and its auditorium contains six stalls and four balconies, totalling 730 seats. The Théâtre du Quai, inaugurated in 2007, has two auditoriums: one contains 980 seats and several balconies, and the other, more flexible, can welcome 400 seated or 960 standing spectators. The Grand Théâtre and the Théâtre du Quai are the venues of three institutions, Angers-Nantes Opéra, an opera company also based in Nantes, the Contemporary Dance National Center (CNDC), inaugurated by Alwin Nikolais in 1978, and the Nouveau théâtre d'Angers (NTA).

The Orchestre National des Pays de la Loire, shared with Nantes, usually performs at the Congress Center, built in 1983, with a capacity of 1,240 seats. Other concert halls include the Chabada, the Amphitéa and the former Ursuline chapel. Local theater companies perform at Théâtre Chanzy, Théâtre du Champ de Bataille, Théâtre de la Comédie or at the Centre Jean Vilar. Each September, the city organizes a street performance festival, called the Accroche-Cœurs.

The Chabada, a popular concert hall, is the cradle of the Angevin contemporary scene and several groups and performers were discovered there, Les Thugs, a punk band formed in 1983, being the first ones. The local scene also includes the alternative rock group La Ruda, the power pop band Pony Pony Run Run, the world music band Lo'Jo and Titi Robin, a performer influenced by Gypsy and Arabic music.

The Premiers Plans festival, dedicated to European first films and meant to help new directors meet their audience, is conducted every year and lasts one week. The films are screened in three small cinemas, while two big generalist multiplexes also exist in Angers.

=== Media ===
Angers had a local TV channel Angers 7 which went bankrupt in 2010 and was replaced 3 years later by Angers Télé. The national French channel France 3, however, still presents local news in its programs. Several national radio stations, such as Virgin Radio, NRJ and Chérie FM maintain local antennas in Angers. The city is also the home of two local stations, Radio Campus and Radio G!. Ouest-France and Le Courrier de l'Ouest are the two local newspapers, the last one having its headquarters in Angers. The city and Angers Loire Métropole also edit their news bulletins.

== Sport ==
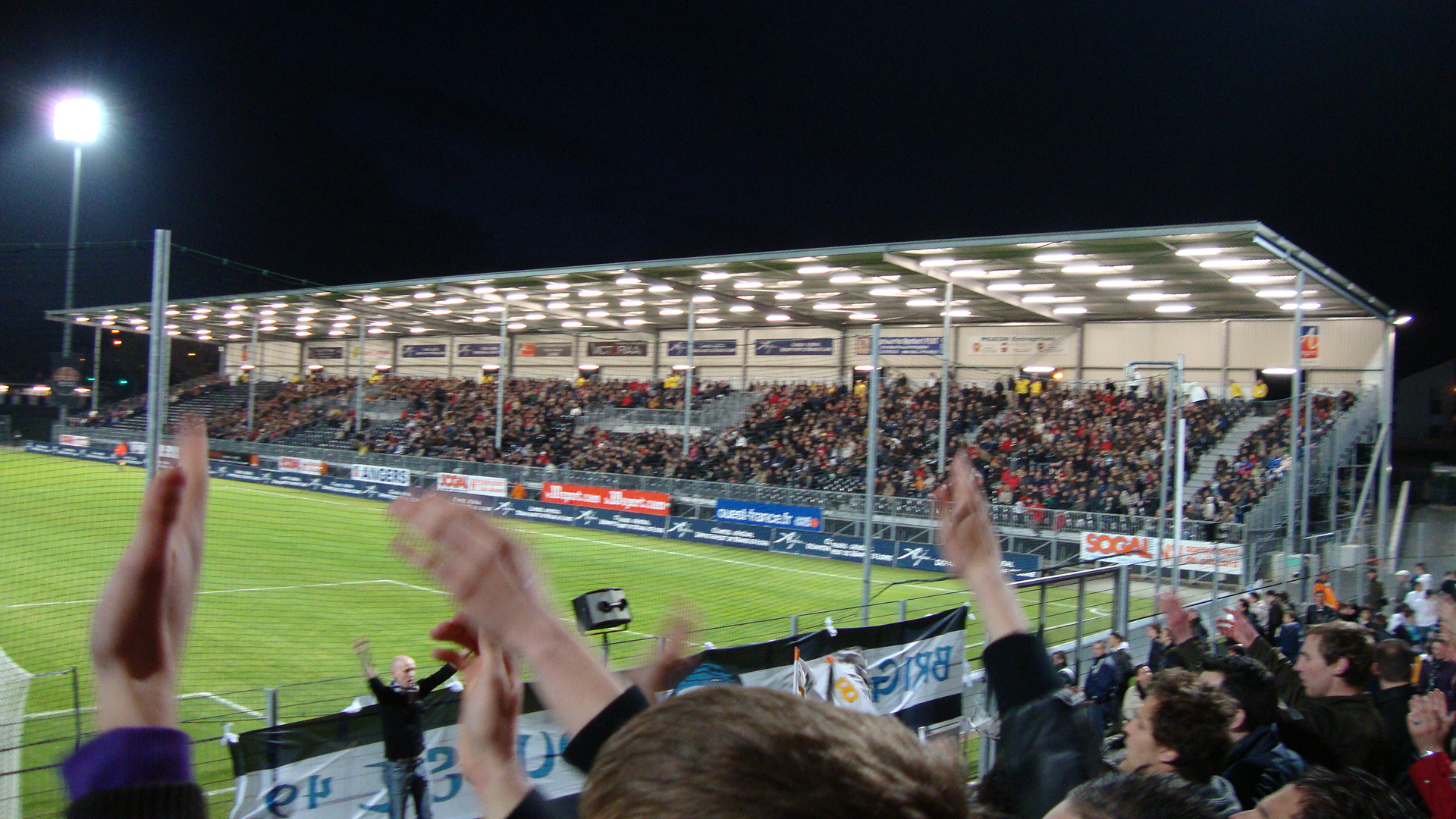
Raymond Kopa Stadium

Angers has many sport teams playing at top levels. Angers SCO is Angers's football team. The club was created in 1919 and returned to Ligue 1 (French top league) in 2015 after 21 years. Les Ducs d'Angers is Angers's ice hockey team. The club plays in the Magnus League (first division). Anjou BC is Angers's basketball team, playing in second division. Vaillante Angers is Angers's table tennis team playing in top division Pro A since the 2000–2001 season. Angers also acts as home to the Angers Aviron Nautique, a rowing club which actively competes in regattas across France.

Raymond Kopa Stadium is the main sports venue which can hold 18,000 people. The city also has a variety of sports halls, tennis courts, swimming pools, shooting and archery stands, a velodrome, a rowing center, an ice rink and a fencing hall. The Lac de Maine Stadium hosted the athletics championships in France in July 2009.

== Notable people ==
- Joan of England, Queen of Sicily (1165–1199), Queen of Sicily.
- René of Anjou (1409–1480), Duke of Anjou and Count of Provence.
- Guillaume Poyet (ca.1473–1548), a French magistrate.
- Jean Bodin (1529–1596), philosopher and jurist.
- François Guyet (1575–1655), philologist
- Gilles Ménage (1613–1692), a French scholar.
- Joseph Proust (1754–1826), chemist responsible for Proust's law
- Michel Eugène Chevreul (1786–1889), chemist
- David d'Angers (1788–1856), sculptor.
- Charles Négrier (1792-1862), physician, military doctor, medical researcher and academic
- François-Joseph Grille (1792–1853), librarian
- Germanicus Mirault (1796–1879), surgeon
- Prosper Ménière (1799–1862), physician
- Frédéric Alfred Pierre, comte de Falloux (1811–1886), a French politician and author.
- Zacharie Astruc (1835–1907), artist
- Édouard Louis Trouessart (1842–1927), zoologist
- René Bazin (1853–1932), writer and educator.
- Renée Marie Gouraud dʻAblancourt (1853-1941), writer
- Fernand Charron (1866–1921), pioneer of motor racing and automobile manufacturing
- Jean Bosler (1878–1973), astronomer
- Yves de la Casinière (1897–1971), composer
- Jean-Adrien Mercier (1899–1995), illustrator, poster artist, and advertising designer
- Jean Durtal (1905–1999), poet and novelist
- Hervé Bazin (1911–1996), writer
- Henri Dutilleux (1916–2013), composer
- Joseph Wresinski (1917–1988), humanitarian activist
- André Bazin (1918–1958), critic of the French New Wave
- Fernande Grudet (1923–2015), brothel-keeper
- Jacques Bompaire (1924–2009), Hellenist
- Jacques Loussier (1934–2019), composer and jazz pianist
- Evelyne de Pontbriand (1950–2024), winemaker
- Valerie Trierweiler (born 1965), political journalist and author
- Eriq Ebouaney (born 1967), actor
- Vincent Boussard (born 1969), opera and theatre director
- Caroline Giron-Panel (born 1979), historian and musicologist
- Nicolas Mahut (born 1982), tennis player
- Juliana Mialoundama (born 1993), basketball player
- Sofiane Boufal (born 1993), football player
- Adèle Castillon (born 2001), a musician
- Désiré Doué (born 2005), football player

== Twin towns – sister cities ==
Angers is twinned with:

- Haarlem, Netherlands (1964)
- Osnabrück, Germany (1964)
- Bamako, Mali (1974)
- Pisa, Italy (1982)
- Wigan, United Kingdom (1988)
- Södertälje, Sweden (1998)
- Yantai, China (2006)
- Austin, United States (2011)
- Toruń, Poland (2011)

== See also ==
- Pays de la Loire
- Abbey of Saint-Aubin
