= Apocalypse Tapestry =

Tapestry woven in Paris, 1377 to 1382

Coordinates: 47.4700°N 0.5600°W

The Apocalypse Tapestry
- Artists: Jean Bondol and Nicholas Bataille
- Year: 1377–1382
- Type: Tapestry
- Location: Musée de la Tapisserie, Château d'Angers, Angers

The Apocalypse Tapestry is a large medieval set of tapestries commissioned by Louis I, Duke of Anjou, and woven in Paris between 1377 and 1382. It depicts the story of the Apocalypse from the Book of Revelation by Saint John the Divine in colourful images, spread over six tapestries that originally totalled 90 scenes, and were about six metres high, and 140 metres long in total.

It is the most significant, and almost the only, survival from the first decades of the great period of tapestry, when the industry developed large workshops and represented the most effective art form for exhibiting the magnificence of royal patrons, not least because large tapestries were hugely expensive. The period began in about 1350, and lasted until at least the 17th century, as tapestry was gradually overtaken in importance by paintings. At this early point relatively few tapestries were made to designs specified by the patron, which seems clearly to have been the case here.

The main weaving centres were ruled by the French and Burgundian branches of the House of Valois, who were extremely important patrons in the period. This began with the four sons of John II of France (d. 1362): Charles V of France, Louis of Anjou, John, Duke of Berry and Philip the Bold, Duke of Burgundy.

Their respective inventories reveal they owned several hundred tapestries between them. The Apocalypse Tapestry is almost the only clear survival from these collections, and the most famous tapestry from the 14th century.

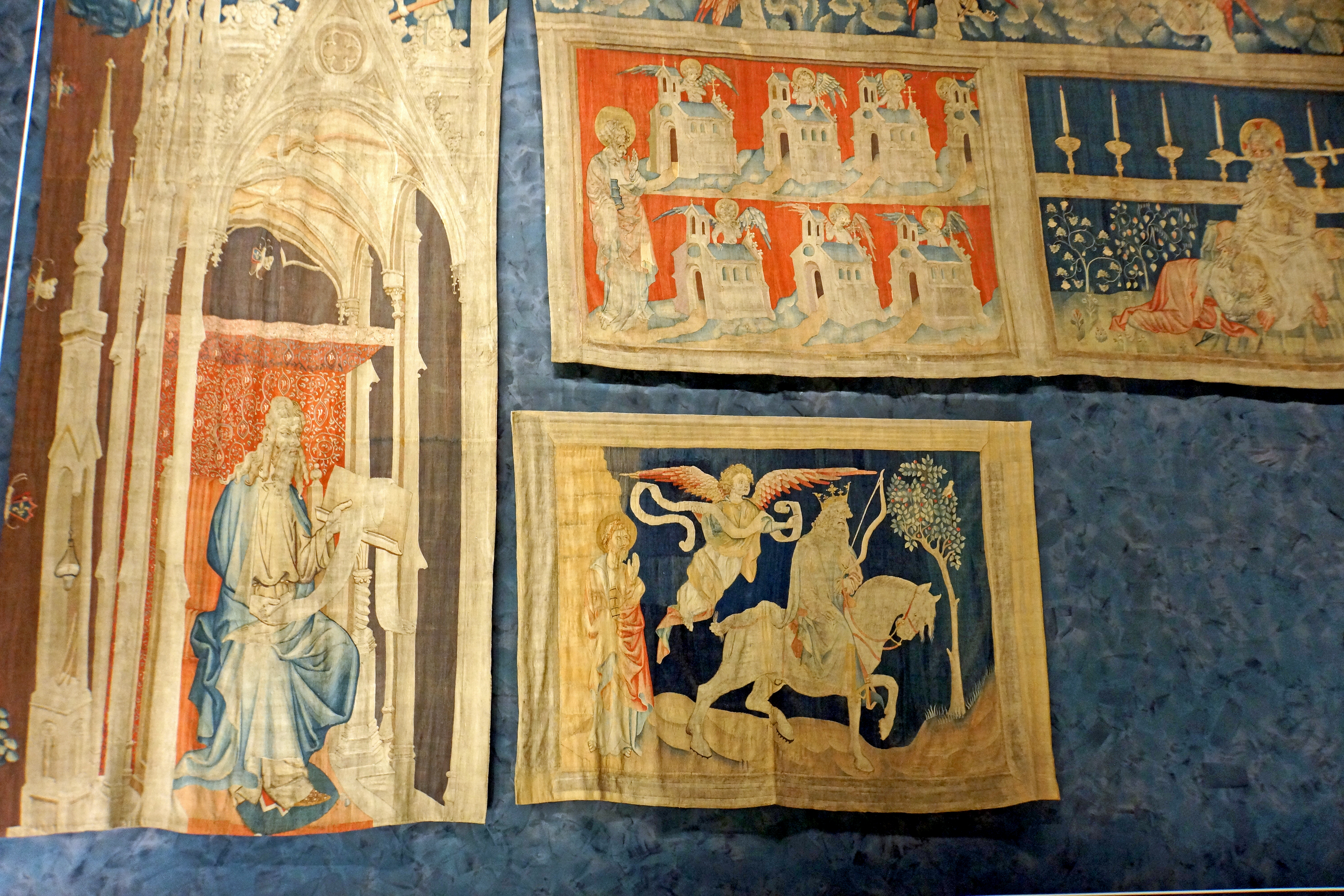
Part of the tapestry on display

Its survival was helped by being given by a later Duke of Anjou in 1480 to Angers Cathedral, where it was kept until the French Revolution, during which it was dispersed and large parts of it destroyed. Most of the tapestry was recovered and restored in the 19th century and is now on display at the Château d'Angers. It is the largest set of medieval tapestries to have survived. Historian Jean Mesqui considers it "one of the great artistic interpretations of the revelation of Saint John, and one of the masterpieces of French cultural heritage".

== History ==
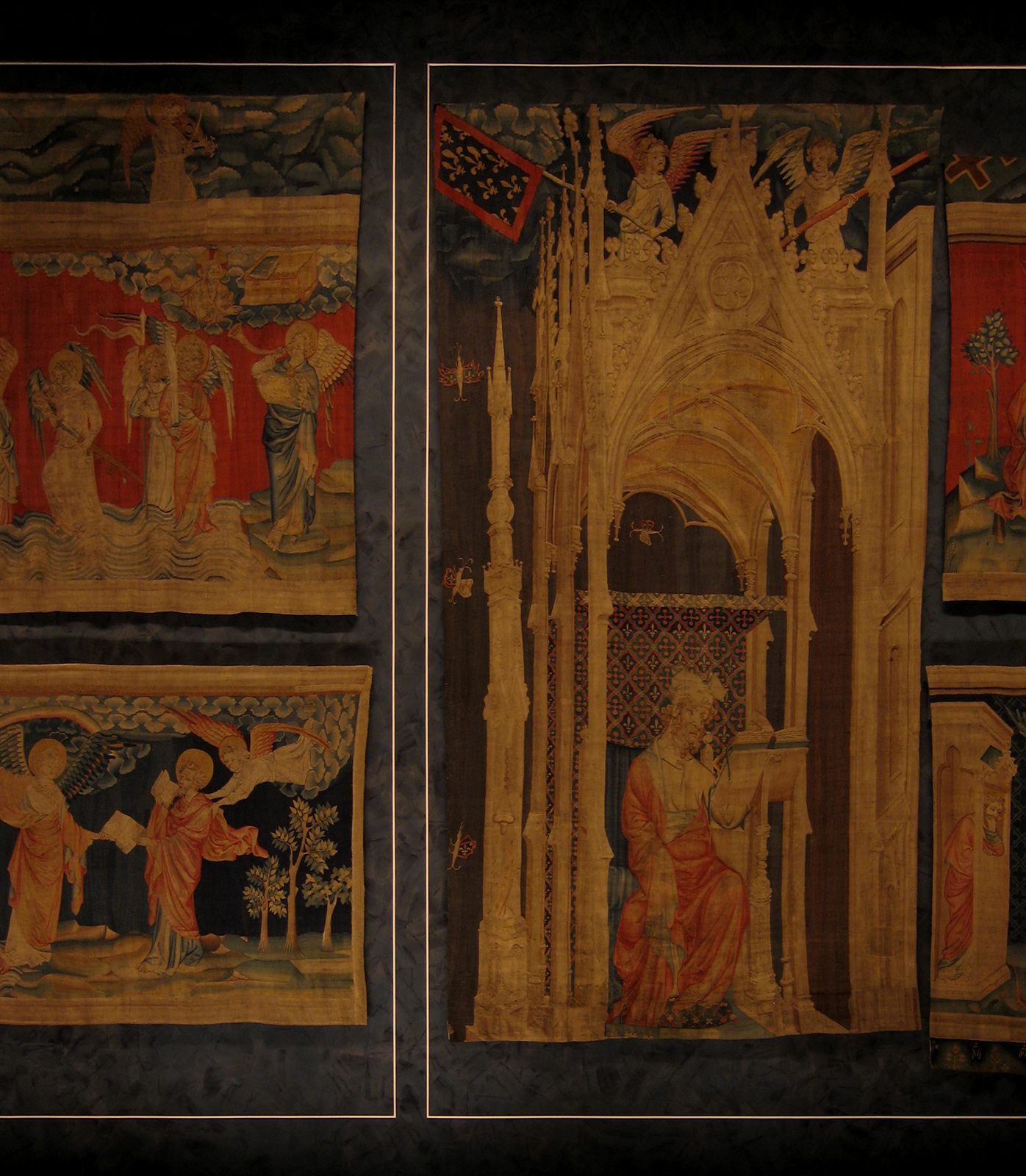
Detail of the tapestry (reverse side), showing an important figure seated under a ceremonial shade

The Apocalypse Tapestry was commissioned by Louis I, Duke of Anjou, around 1373. Jean Bondol, a Flemish artist who was a court artist of Louis' brother Charles V of France, made designs or modellos for the set; these were probably rather small and later worked up into full-size cartoons for the weavers to follow.

Bondol used an illuminated manuscript Apocalypse from the royal library as a partial model. The commission was arranged through the Paris merchant Nicholas Bataille, who in the past was often regarded as the head weaver, but is now thought of as only the middleman and perhaps the financier of the Paris workshop run by Robert Poinçon. It cost 6,000 francs. At this point Paris was still the leading tapestry-weaving centre, and Bataille supplied Louis with many tapestries from 1363 until the 1380s. The set was probably finally complete by 1380, or 1382.

It was still unusual for a tapestry to be commissioned by a buyer to a specific design in this way.

It is uncertain how Louis used the tapestry; it was probably intended to be displayed outside, supported by six wooden structures, possibly arranged so as to position the viewer near to the centre of the display, imitating a jousting field.

The tapestry and its theme would have also helped to bolster the status of Louis' Valois dynasty, then involved in the Hundred Years' War with England.

The tapestry shows the story of the Apocalypse from the Book of Revelation by Saint John the Divine. In the 14th century, the Apocalypse was a popular story, focusing on the heroic aspects of the last confrontation between good and evil and featuring battle scenes between angels and beasts.

Although many of the scenes in the story included destruction and death, the account ended with the triumphant success of good, forming an uplifting story. Various versions of the Apocalypse story, or cycle, were circulating in Europe at the time and Louis chose to use an Anglo-French Gothic style of the cycle, partially derived from a manuscript he borrowed from his brother, Charles V of France, in 1373.

This version of the Apocalypse had first been recorded in Metz and then later adapted by English artists; Charles' manuscript had been produced in England around 1250.

Louis may also have been influenced by a particularly grand tapestry given to Charles by the magistrates of Lille in 1367.

After a century in the ownership of the dukes of Anjou, René of Anjou bequeathed the tapestry to Angers Cathedral in 1480 where it remained for many years.

During the French Revolution the Apocalypse Tapestry was looted and cut up into pieces. The pieces of the tapestry were used for various purposes: as floor mats, to protect local orange trees from frost, to shore up holes in buildings, and to insulate horse stables.

During the Revolution many medieval tapestries were destroyed, both through neglect and through being melted down to recover the gold and silver used in their designs. That did not apply in this case, as the tapestries were in wool only.

The surviving fragments were rediscovered in 1848 and preserved. They were returned to the cathedral in 1870.

The cathedral was not ideal for displaying and preserving the tapestry.

The neighbouring Château d'Angers had been used as a French military base for many years, but transferred to civilian use after the Second World War. In 1954, the tapestry was moved there, to be displayed in a new gallery designed by French architect Bernard Vitry.

Between 1990 and 2000 the castle gallery was itself improved, with additional light and ventilation controls installed to protect the tapestry.

== Description and style ==
The tapestry was made in six sections, each 78-foot (24 m) wide by 20-foot (6.1 m) high, comprising 90 different scenes. Each scene had a red or blue background, alternating between the sections. They would have taken considerable effort to produce, with between 50 and 84 person-years of effort required by the weaving teams. Only 71 of the original 90 scenes survive. The tapestry is dominated by blue, red and ivory coloured threads, supported by orange and green colours, with gilt and silver woven into the wool and silk. These colours are now considerably faded on the front of the tapestry but were originally similar to the deep and vibrant hues seen on the back of the tapestry panels.

Jean Bondol's design follows the Franco-Flemish school of tapestry design, with rich, realist, fluid images placed into a simple, clear structure through the course of the tapestry. As a result, the angels and monsters are depicted with considerable energy and colour, the impact reinforced by the sheer size of the tapestry, which allows them to be portrayed slightly larger than life-size. Various approaches are taken in the tapestry to interpreting the allegorical language used by St John in his original text; in particular, the tapestry takes an unusual approach to portraying the Fourth Horseman of the Apocalypse, Death. The depiction of Death in this tapestry follows the style then becoming popular in England: he is represented as a decaying corpse, rather than the more common 14th century portrayal of Death as a conventional, living person.

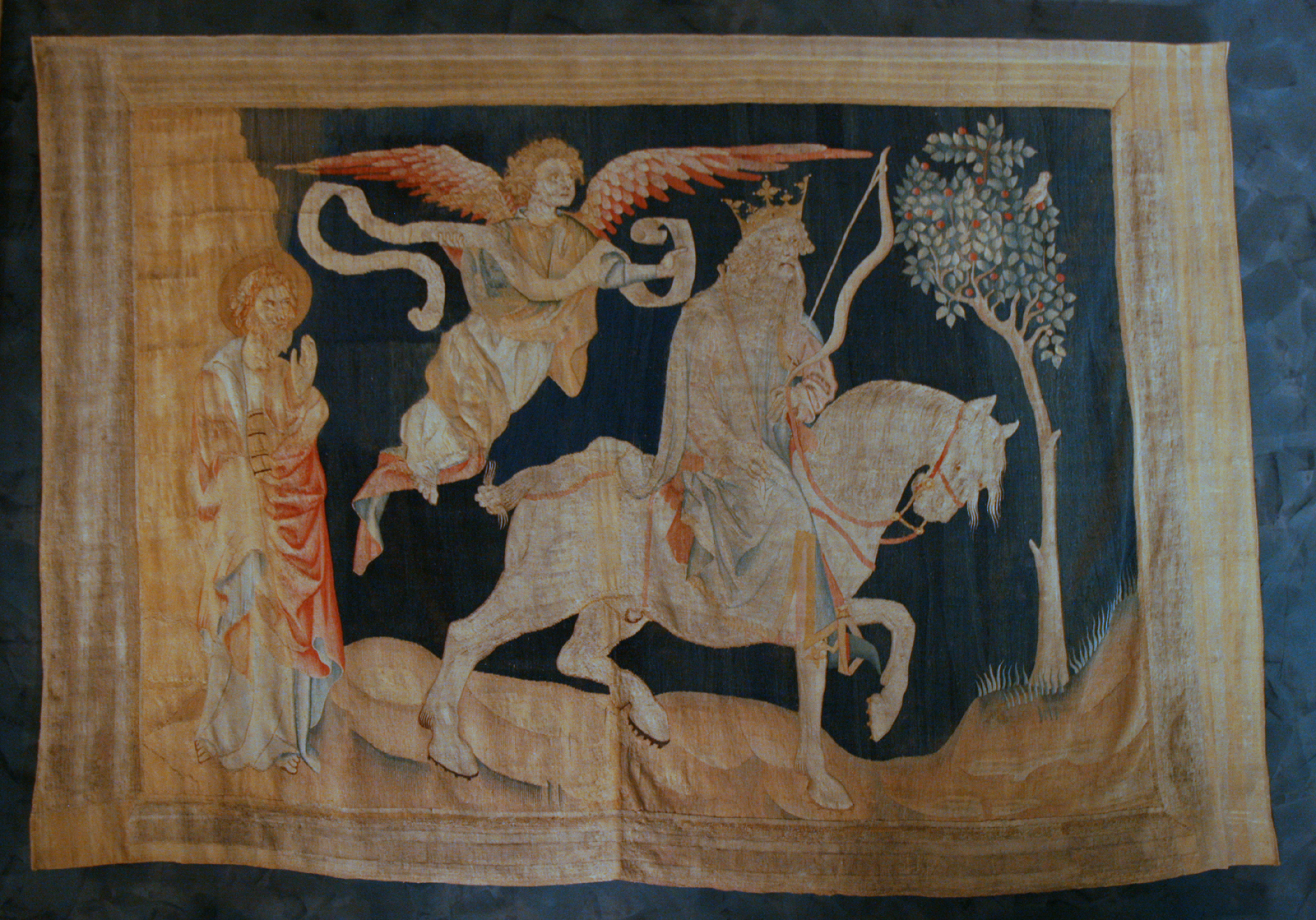
The first horseman: Conquest

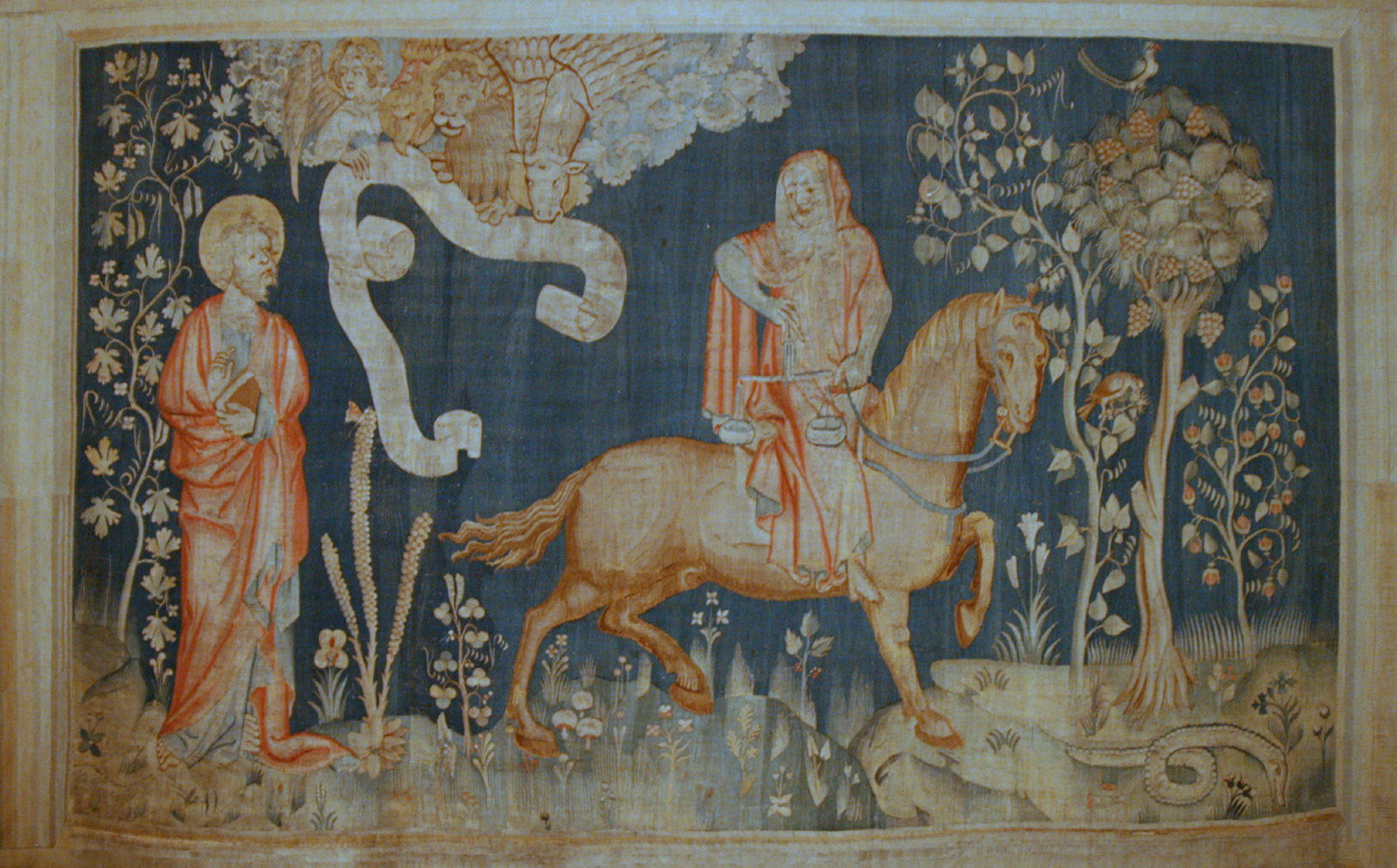
The third horseman: Famine

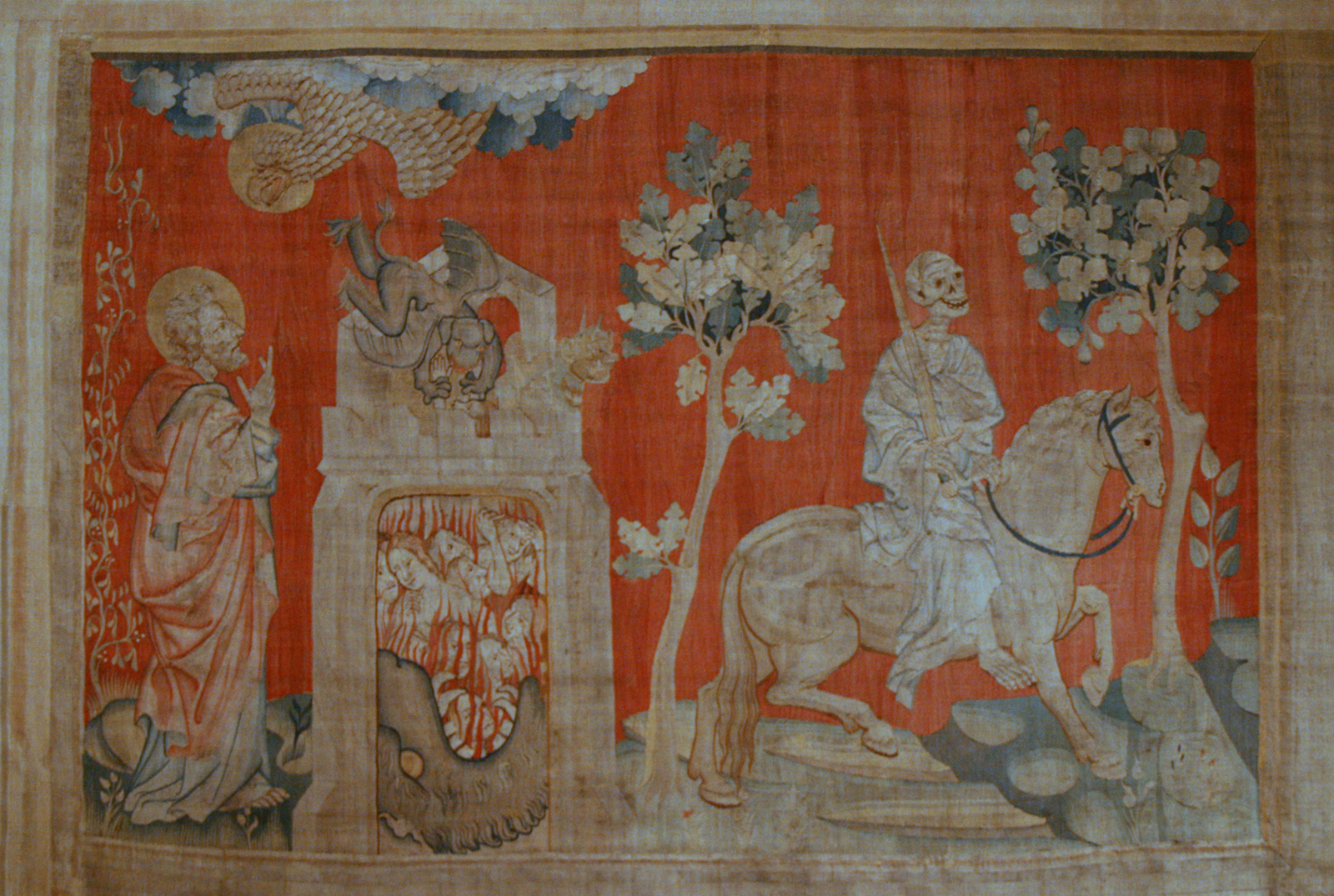
The fourth horseman: Death - represented as a decaying corpse

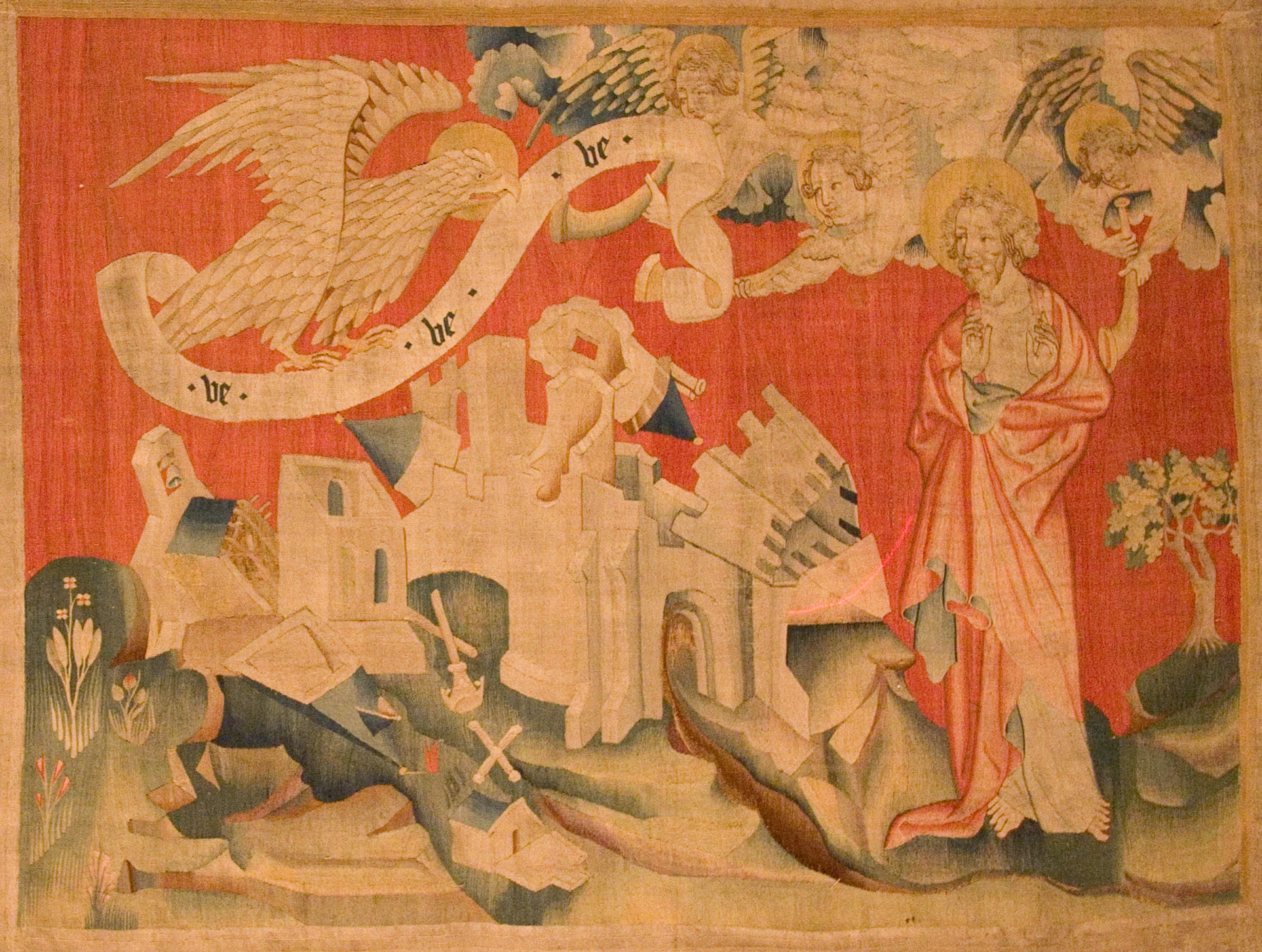
The eagle of Doom

== Bibliography ==
- Aberth, John (2001). From the Brink of the Apocalypse: Confronting Famine, War, Plague and Death in the Later Middle Ages. London: Routledge. ISBN 9780415927154.
- Bausum, Dolores (2001). Threading Time: A Cultural History of Threadwork. Fort Worth, US: TCU Press. ISBN 9780415927154.
- Bell, Susan Groag (2004). The Lost Tapestries of the City of Ladies: Christine de Pizan's Renaissance Legacy. Berkeley, US: University of California Press. ISBN 9780520234109.
- Belozerskaya, Marina (2004). Luxury Arts of the Renaissance. Los Angeles, US: J. Paul Getty Museum. ISBN 9780892367856.
- Benton, Janetta Rebold (2009). Materials, Methods and Masterpieces of Medieval Art. Santa Barbara, US: Praeger. ISBN 9780275994181.
- Campbell, Thomas P. and Ainsworth, Maryan Wynn, Tapestry in the Renaissance: Art and Magnificence, 2002, Metropolitan Museum of Art, ISBN 9780300093704, fully online
- Klein, Peter K. (1992). "Introduction: The Apocalypse in Medieval Art". In Emmerson, Richard K.; McGinn, Bernard (eds.). The Apocalypse in the Middle Ages. New York, US: Cornell University Press. ISBN 9780801495502.
- Mesqui, Jean (2001). Château d'Angers. Paris: Centre des monuments nationaux. ISBN 9782858226047.
