= Turret (architecture) =

Small tower that projects vertically from a building's wall; often a fortification

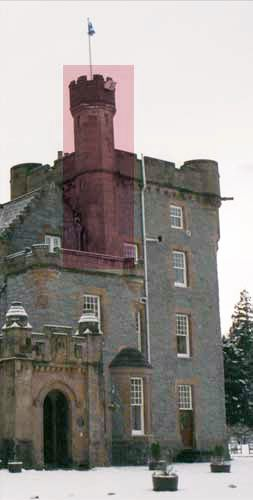
Turret (highlighted in red) attached to a tower on a baronial building in Scotland

In architecture, a turret is a small circular tower, usually notably smaller than the main structure, that projects outwards from a wall or corner of that structure. Turret also refers to the small towers built atop larger tower structures.

== Etymology ==
The word turret originated in around the year 1300 from touret which meant "small tower rising from a city wall, castle, or other larger building." Touret came from the Old French term torete which is the diminutive form of tour, meaning "tower." Tour dates back to the Latin word turris which also means "tower."

There is a record from 1862 of turret being used to mean "low, flat gun tower on a warship." Around this time, the word split into two separate definitions, with this definition being the one that goes on to describe gun turrets, a separate idea from the architectural element.

== Uses ==
Turrets initially arose on castles out of a defensive need for greater visibility. Since they project outwards from the main structure, turrets gave garrisons a better line of sight to spot possible attackers. Thus, they also provided a better defensive position for defensive military forces to originate from. Turrets constructed above the rest of a structure only improve visibility, providing 360-degree views of the surrounding land allowing enemies to be spotted from further away. This provided more time for a fortress's defenders to prepare for an attack. Turrets offered greater resilience to attacks and were less vulnerable than free-standing watch towers.

As their defensive necessity lessened, turrets began to be used as ornamental elements instead. Turrets were sometimes used to house staircases, and towards the end of the thirteenth century they became important in this fashion. They allowed for the staircases to occupy smaller spaces without affecting the layout of the structure to which they were attached. Since turrets project outward from a structure, they directed attention, and more ornamentation was focused on them than the rest of the facade.

== Structure ==
Turrets could vary in size, although they all shared the appearance of small towers, either built into walls or atop larger towers. They projected outward from the structure they were incorporated into, greatly contributing to the characteristics discussed in the "Uses" section. Turrets do not extend down to the ground like full-sized towers. When built into walls, turrets are generally found at the corner of structures where two walls meet. Sometimes, however, they are found in the middle of a wall. Since turrets projected outward from a structure, they had to be supported either by weight-bearing corbels or be cantilevered. This put a restriction on how large a turret could be constructed. Turrets were expensive to build, as hoisting stones high above the ground to construct them was highly laborious. It is thought that many were timber-framed and cladded in stone which would have reduced the weight needed to be supported by corbels/cantilevers and reduced the cost of construction. Turrets were traditionally supported by a corbel. The top of a turret could be finished with a pointed roof or another type of apex or might have had crenellations, such as in the image above.

== Turrets on homes ==
In the modern day, turrets are most commonly found on homes. These turrets are still towers that project outwardly from the main structure, not extending down to the ground. Residential turrets were greatly popularized in the Queen Anne residential style, and can often be found on a variety of Victorian and Queen Anne home designs today. Some residential turrets are designed to be open-air balconies as well. Turrets can help to bring in more natural light and are often used to create more space in a home. These elements make a property more interesting to prospective buyers and homes with a turret generally appraise higher than without one. Alternatively, turrets usually increase construction costs of a home as they are more difficult to frame and support than more common elements.

== Gallery ==
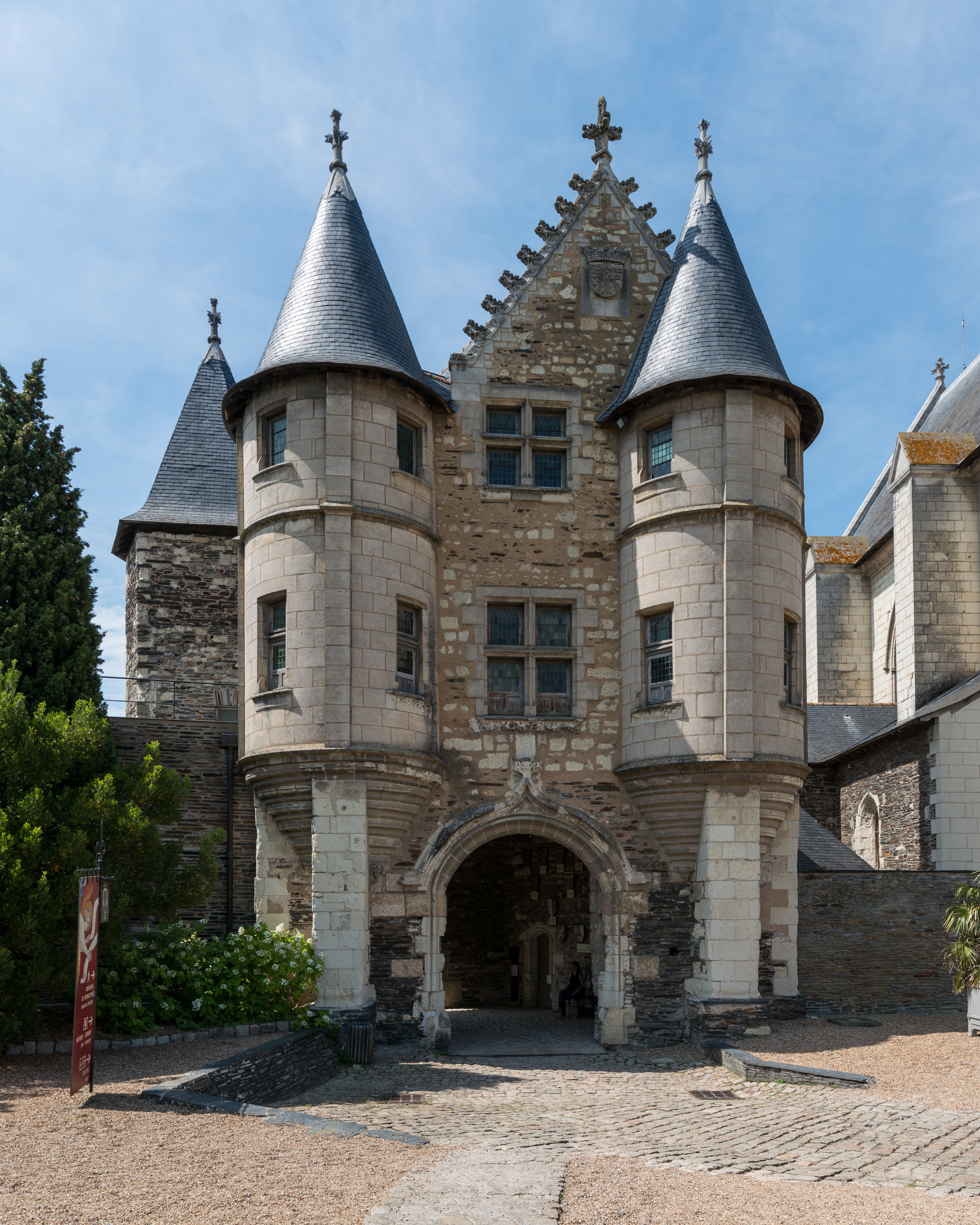
Châtelet of the Château d'Angers, Maine-et-Loire, France, unknown architect, 13th century

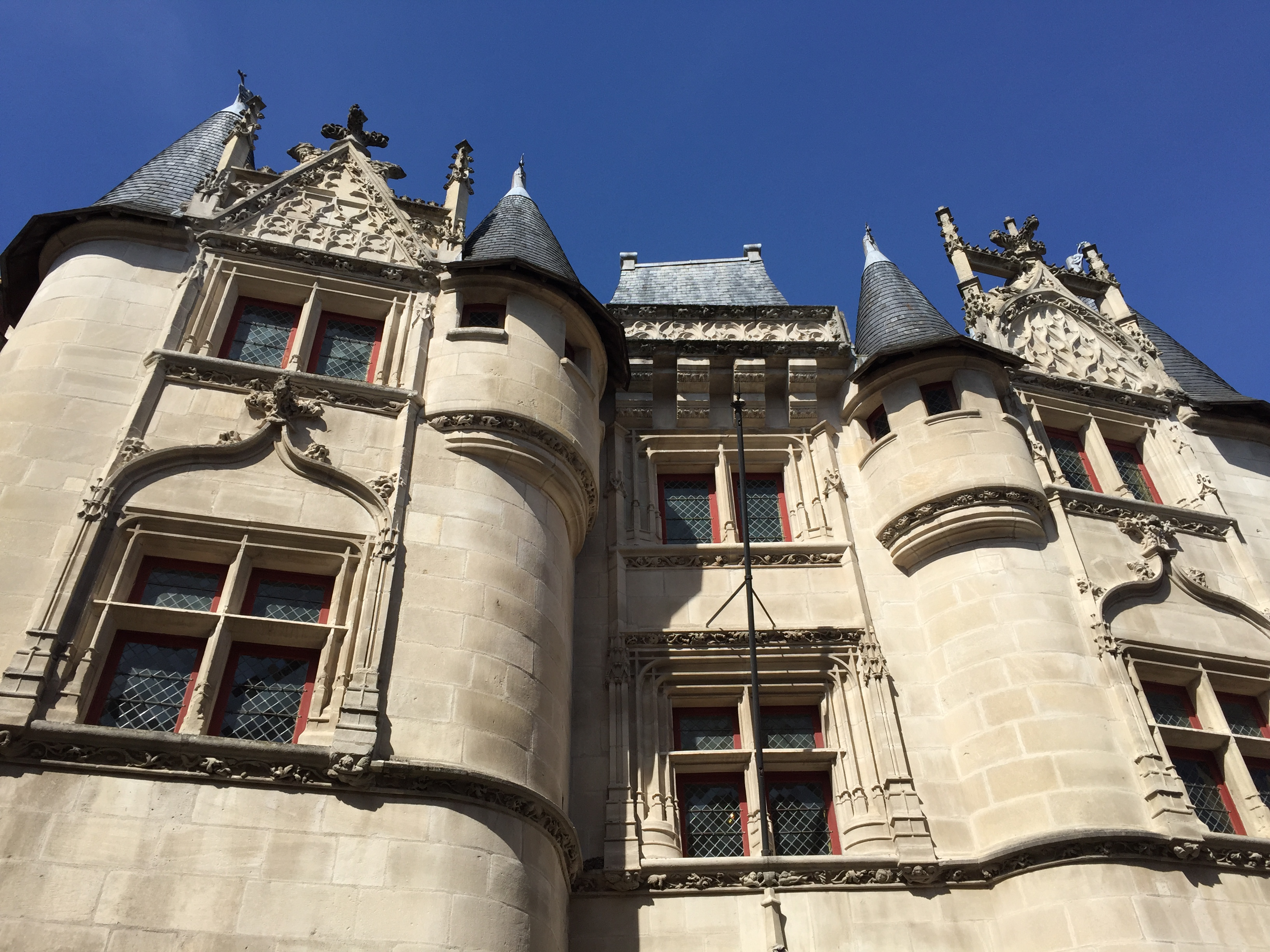
Hôtel Fumé, Poitiers, France, unknown architect, 15th–16th centuries

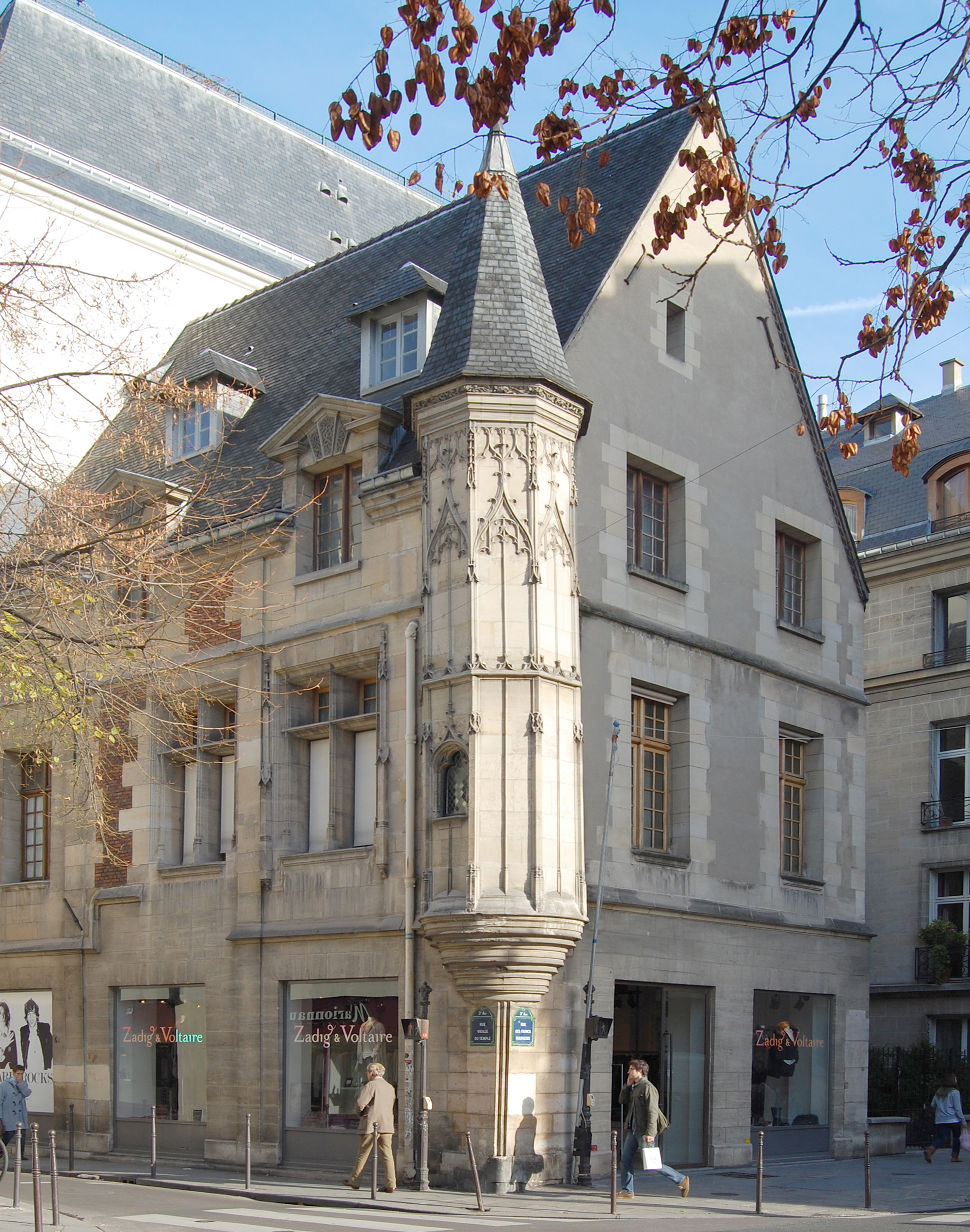
Hôtel Hérouet, Paris, unknown architect, unknown date

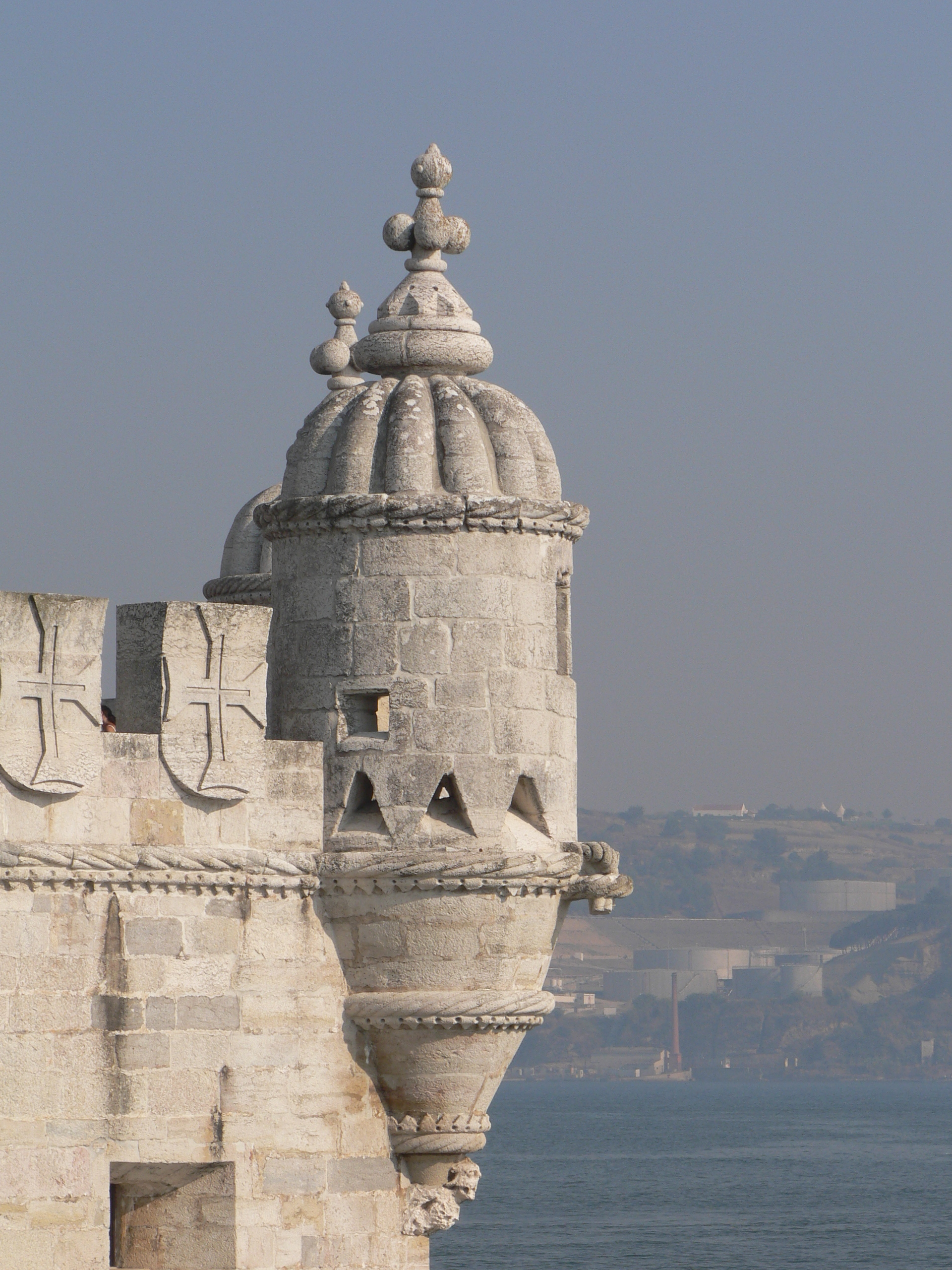
Bastion terrace on Belém Tower with its Moorish bartizan turrets and cupolas from the north-west, Lisbon, Portugal, by Francisco de Arruda, c. 1514–1519

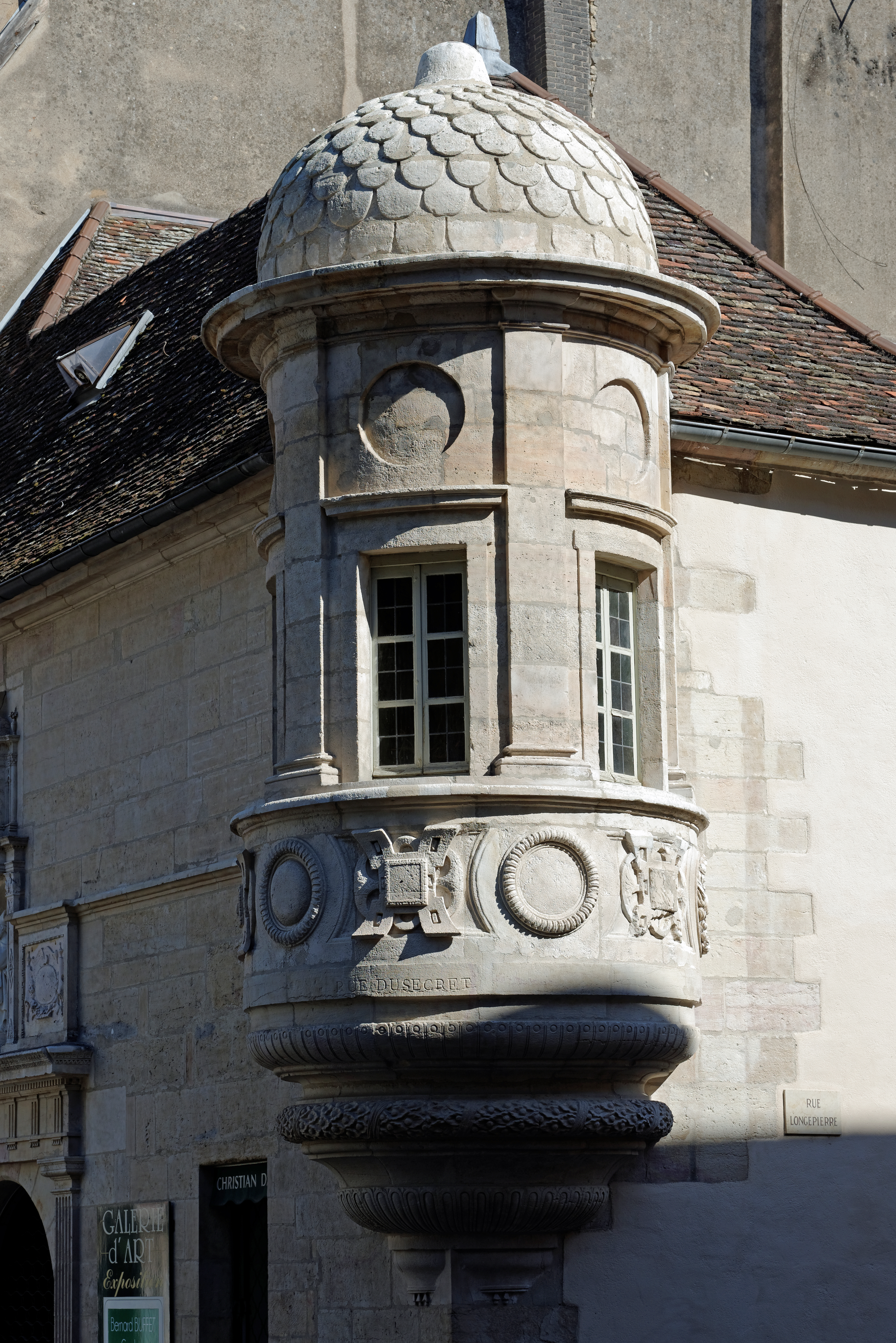
Hôtel de Berbis, Dijon, France, unknown architect, 1552–1558

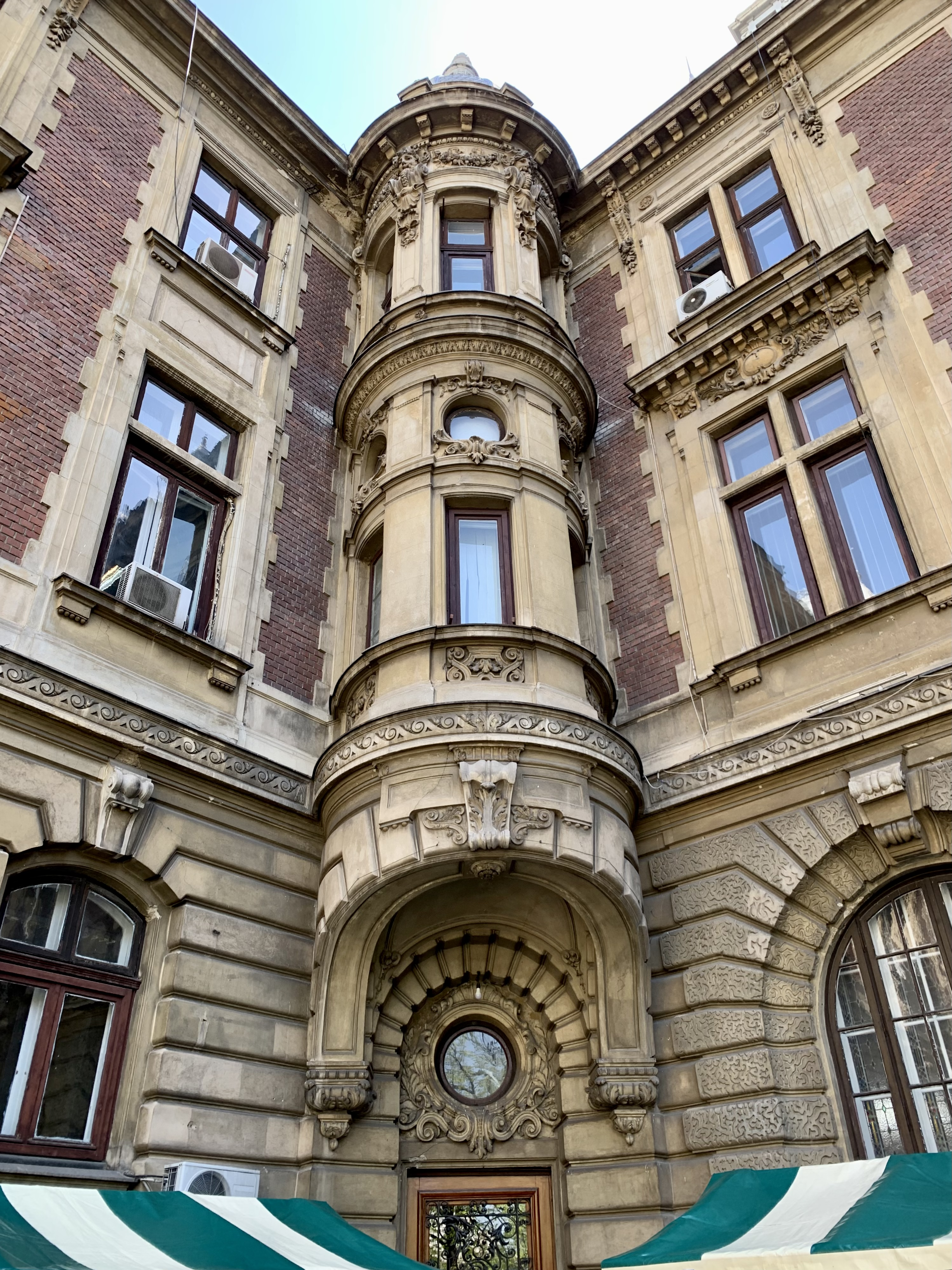
Ministry of Agriculture and Rural Development of Romania on Bulevardul Carol I, Bucharest, Romania, by Louis Blanc, 1895

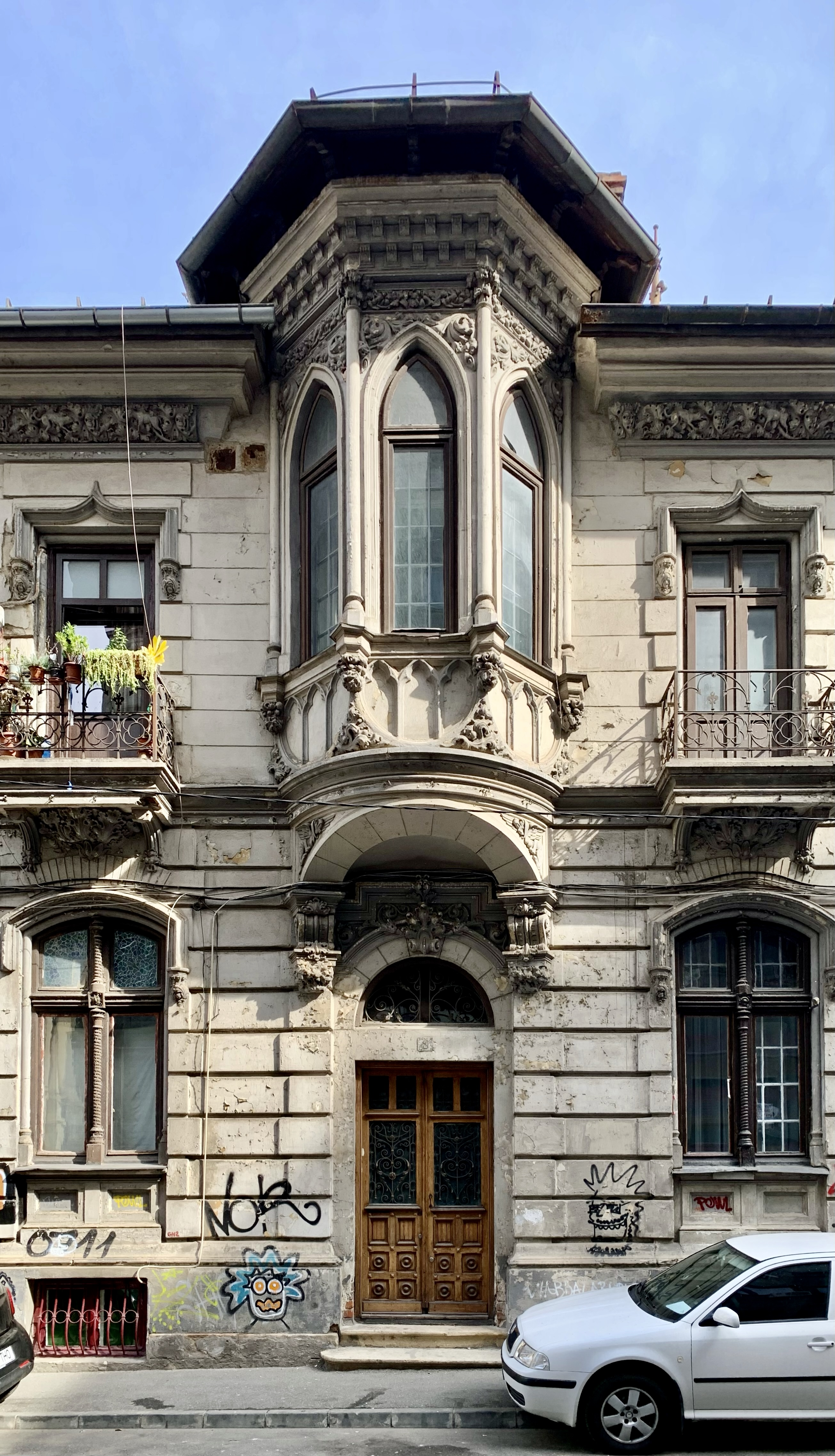
Strada Radu Cristian no. 2, Bucharest, unknown architect, c. 1900

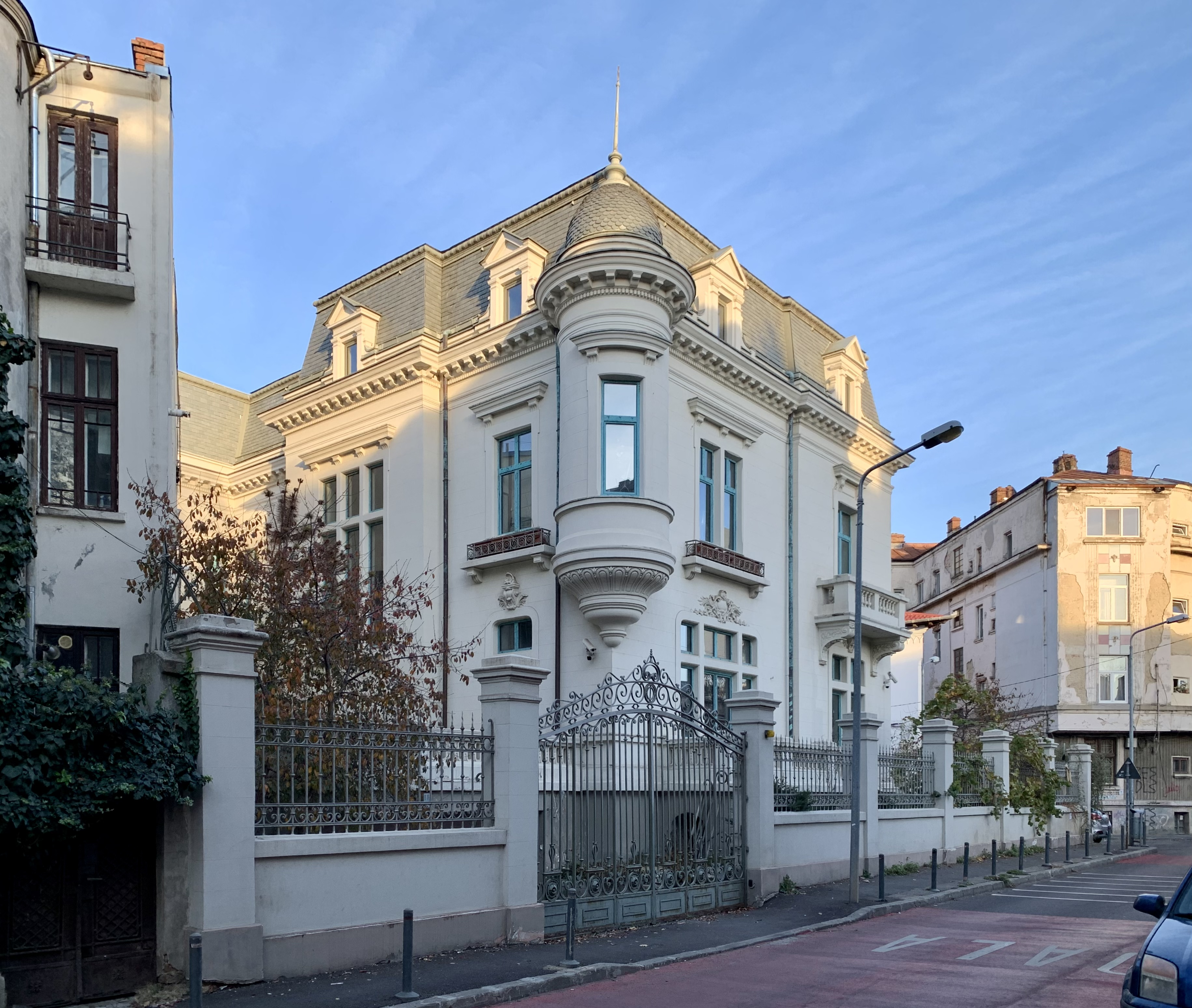
Strada Culmea Veche no. 1, Bucharest, unknown architect, c. 1910

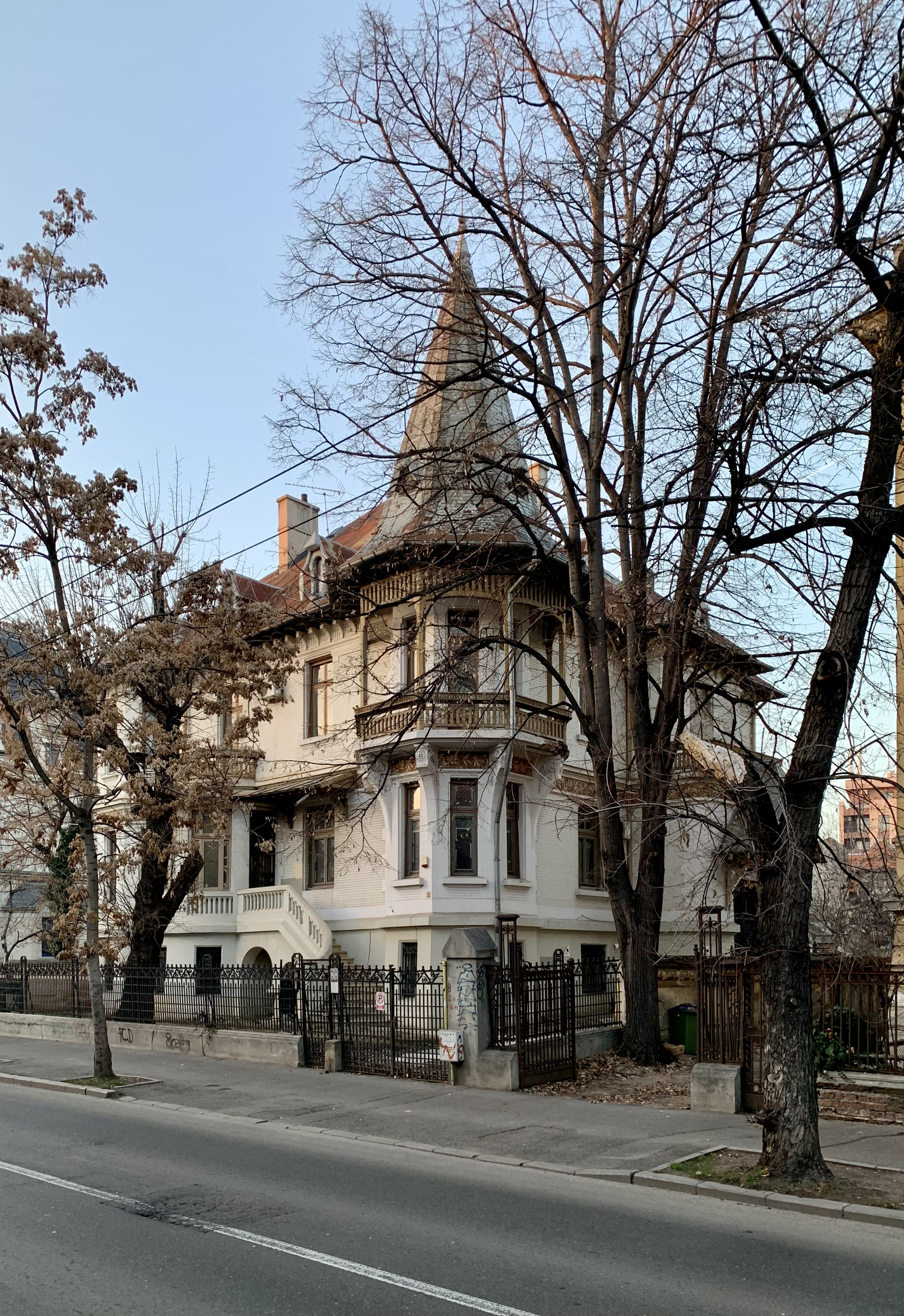
Maria Ioanidi House on Bulevardul Dacia, Bucharest, by Ion D. Berindey, 1911

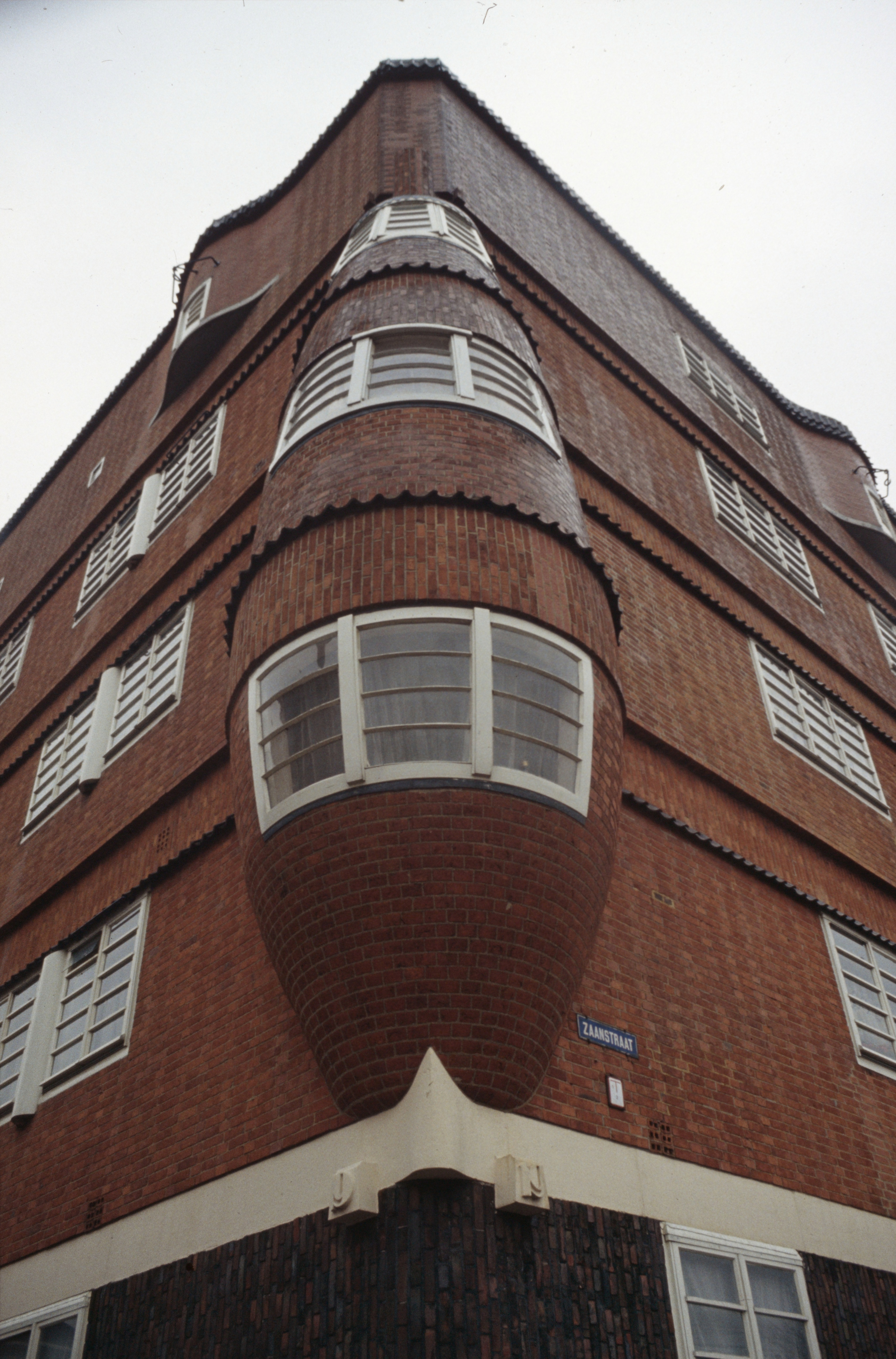
Turret on the Het Schip housing in the Amsterdam School style, Amsterdam, Netherlands, 1919, by Michel de Klerk

== See also ==
- Bartizan – Small turret projecting from the top of towers or parapets
- Bay window
- Oriel window
- Turret (Hadrian's Wall)
