= International Castle Research Society =

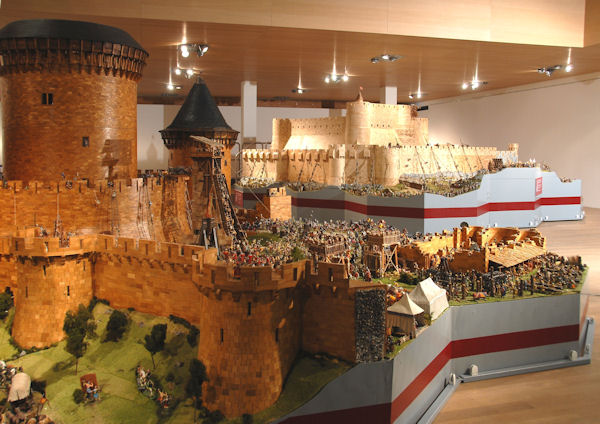
Donjon of Coucy and the Crac des Chevaliers, Bonn, 2009

The International Castle Research Society (ICRS) was established in Aachen in 1986 as a not-for-profit organization following earlier initiatives by Bernhard Siepen, architect, who has been its president since 2000. Early supporters were the long-standing Aachen member of parliament, Dr. Hans Stercken, and Consul Cornel Renfert, of the Franco-German Chamber of Commerce, Paris.

== Background ==
The first model, the Donjon of Coucy, was started in 1997, with a number of models following, the latest being the Castel del Monte. Whereas the earlier models were of French fortified keeps, or donjons, then Crusader castles and bazaars as well as medieval ships, for some time now ICRS has been working on creating models of palaces typical of the 9th to 12th centuries. There are also plans for a model of the imperial Aachen palace of Charlemagne, dating from around AD 800, and of historic buildings in Jerusalem.

== ICRS activities ==
The president, team and ICRS consultants:

- create models of historic buildings, ships, life- scenes
- bring these models to life peopling them with hand-painted figurines
- present models, descriptions, plans of important castles
- organize seminars, talks, multimedia shows as well as visits to exhibitions and existing historic buildings
- support and organize research study courses on historic buildings at school and university level
- train young people in handicrafts relating to creating models

== Models ==
Models created by ICRS based on historical sources, at 1/25 of natural size

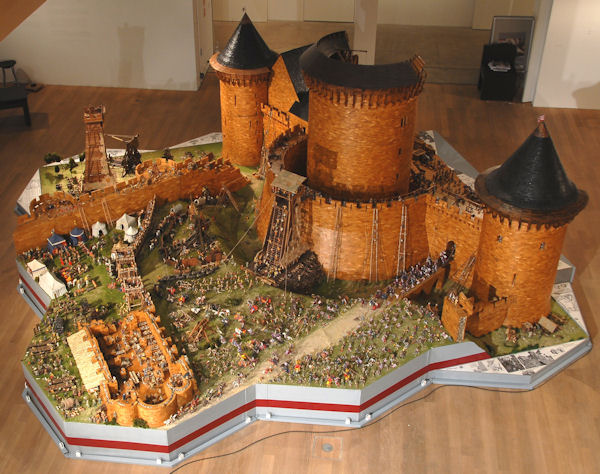
Donjon of Coucy, France (AD 1339)
6x6 metres, 2,40 m height, c 2,500 figurines

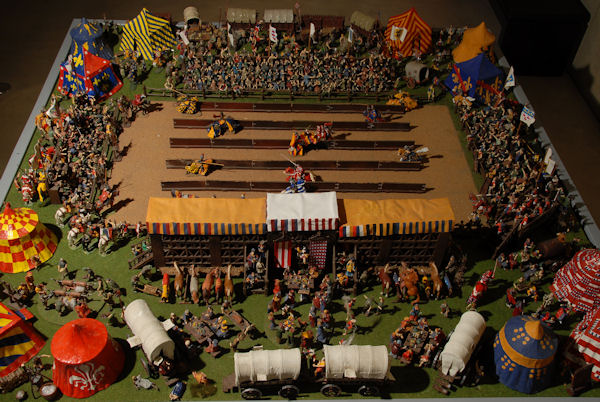
French jousting tournament
2x2 metres, c 700 figurines

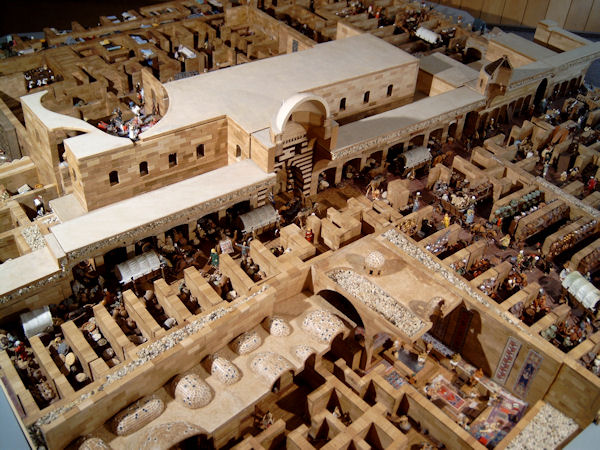
Aleppo Bazaar (16th century)
4x4 metres, c 750 figurines

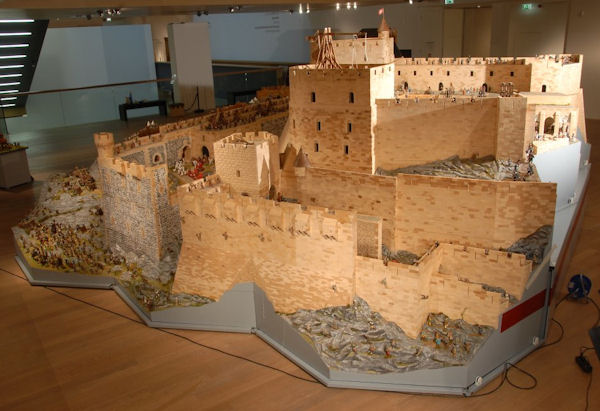
Crac des Chevaliers, Syria (AD 1271)
6x6 metres, 2.30 m height, c 2,000 figurines

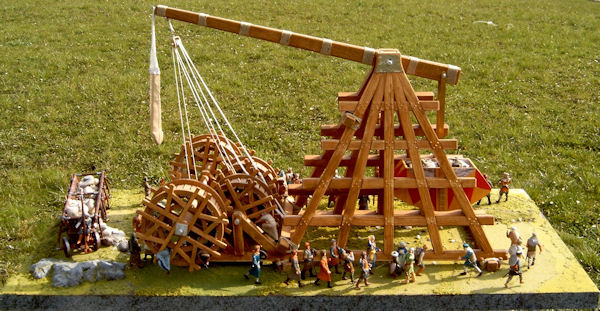
Arab trebuchets and mangonels
1x0,6 meters, c 50 figurines

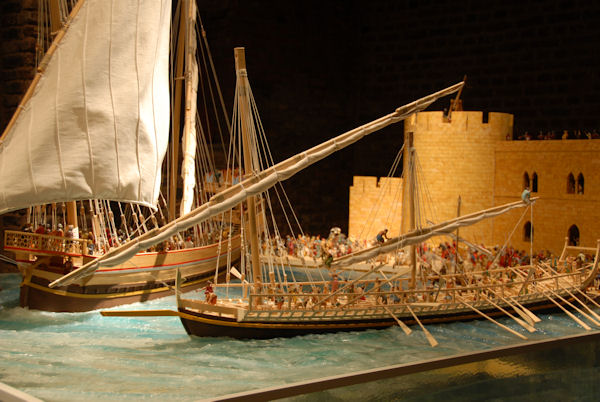
Crusader ships anchored in Akko harbour (AD 1270)
3x2 metres, c 600 figurines

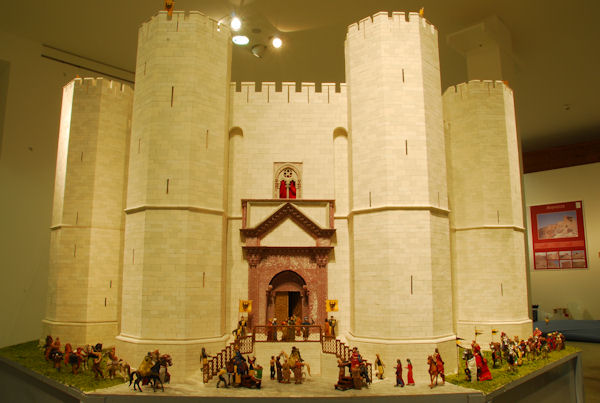
Castel del Monte
3x3 metres, c 400 figurines

== Exhibitions ==
More than one million people in both in Europe and North America so far have visited ICRS exhibitions.

Place	Museum	Year	Title of exhibition
Bonn	LVR State Museum	2009	Models of Medieval Castles
Washington D.C.	National Geographic Museum	2006	Castles of the Crusades. A view in miniature
Omaha (Nebraska)	Joslyn Art Museum	2006	French Donjons: Castle of Coucy, Medieval Life in Miniature
Frankfort on the Main	Museum of Archaeology	2005/2006	Castles and Bazaars of Crusader Times
Sully-sur-Loire	Château de Sully-sur-Loire	2005	In the Days of the Donjons (Au temps des donjons)
Solingen / Wuppertal	Schloß Burg	2005	Donjon of Coucy
Düsseldorf	Haus der Architekten	2004/05	Aleppo to Coucy – Orient to Occident
Kulmbach	Plassenburg	2004	French Donjons
Frankfort on the Main	Museum of Archaeology	2003	Medieval Skyscrapers
Mönchengladbach	Schloss Rheydt	2002	Coucy 1225
Erfurt	Runneburg	2001	French Castles
Washington D.C.	National Geographic Museum	2001	French Donjons: Castle of Donjon
Dresden	Kriebstein Castle	2000	French Donjons
Coburg	Veste Coburg	2000	French Donjons – Mighty Castles
Meissen	Albrechtsburg	2000	French Donjons
Soissons	Musée de Soissons: St. Leger Abbey	1999	Château de Coucy, Image et mémoire
Strasbourg	Hôtel du Département	1999	Les donjons français
Loches	Château de Loches	1998	Les donjons de l’ouest de la France
Aachen	Public Hall Aachen Savings Bank	1998	French Donjons

== Publications ==
- Französische Donjons, ed. Bernhard Siepen, Aachen 2002, ISBN 3-00-007776-6
- Wohntürme, ed. Heinz Müller, Langenweißbach 2002, ISBN 3-930036-76-2
- Île-de-France gothique – 2 – Les demeures seigneuriales, ed. Jean Mesqui, Paris 1988, ISBN 2-7084-0374-5
- Châteaux et enceintes de la France Médiévale, ed.Jean Mesqui, Paris 1991, ISBN 2-7084-0419-9
- Les programmes résidentiels du château de Coucy du XIIIe au XVIe siècle, ed. Jean Mesqui, Paris 1994
- Burgen und Basare der Kreuzfahrerzeit, eds. Hans Altmann and Bernhard Siepen, Fulda 2005, ISBN 3-86568-046-1 (book of the exhibition)
- Burgen und Basare der Kreuzfahrerzeit, eds. Bernhard Siepen, Karina Kisza and Nina Radermacher (painting book), Fulda 2005, ISBN 3-86568-059-3
- Spuren der Kreuzfahrer – Modelle, eds. Bernhard Siepen and Ulrich Alertz, Aachen 2009, ISBN 978-3-927535-21-3
- Damaskus – Aleppo – 5000 Jahre Stadtentwicklung in Syrien, eds Mammoun Fansa, Heinz Gaube, Jens Windelberg, Mainz 2000, ISBN 3-8053-2694-7
- Castel del Monte – Forschungsergebnisse der Jahre 1990 bis 1996, ed. Wulf Schirmer, Mainz 2000, ISBN 3-8053-2657-2
- Wissenschaft und Technik im Islam, Einführung in die Geschichte der arabisch-islamischen Wissenschaften, ed. Fuat Sezgin, Frankfurt am Main 2003, ISBN 3-8298-0072-X
