= Château d'Angers =

Castle in Angers, Maine-et-Loire, France

- Angers, France
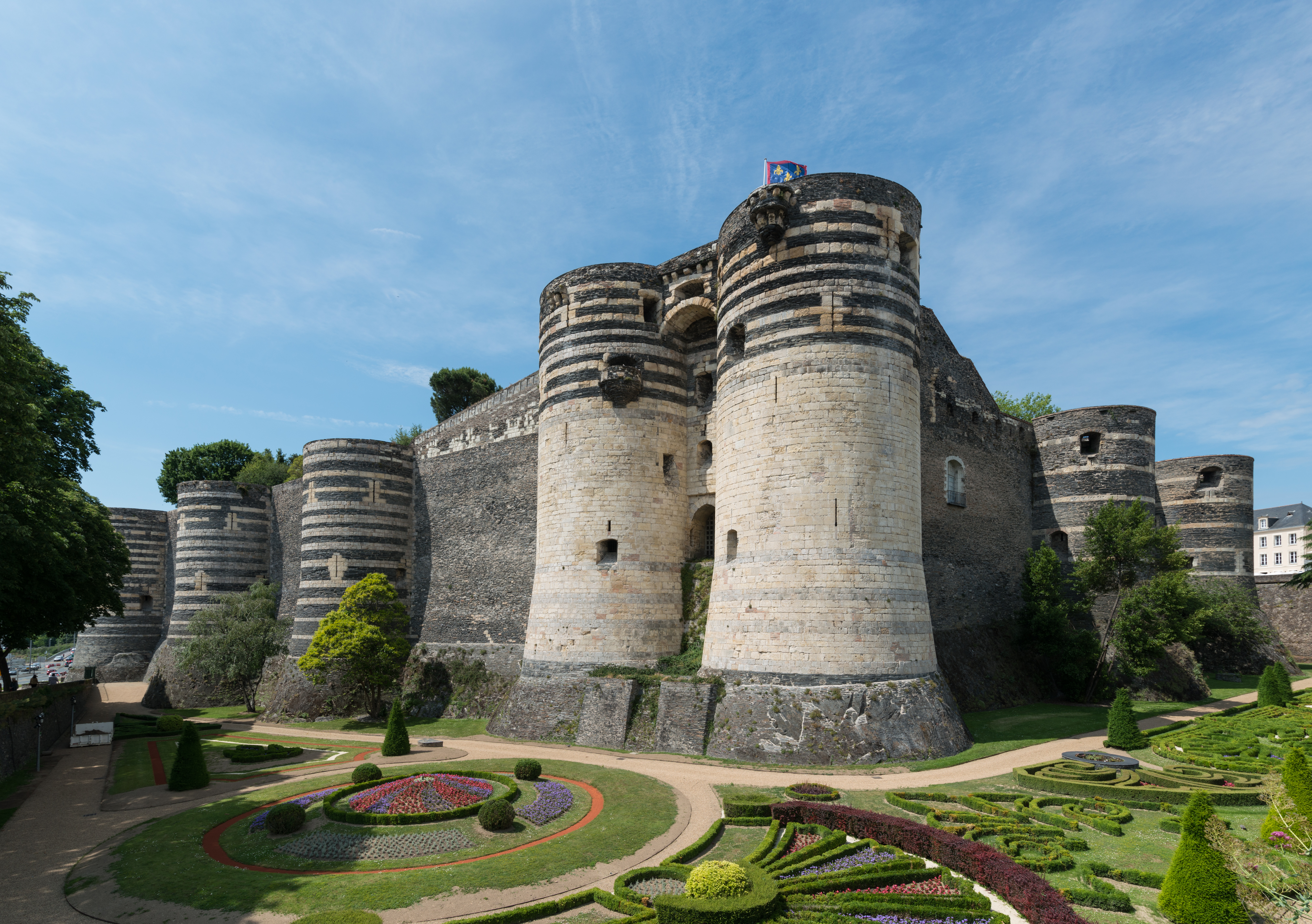
- The south façade

Site information
- Type: Medieval castle
- Website: www.chateau-angers.fr/en

Location
- Coordinates: 47°28′12″N 0°33′36″W

Site history
- Built: 9th and early 13th centuries
- Built by: Blanche of Castile, Regent
- Events: Minority of Louis IX of France

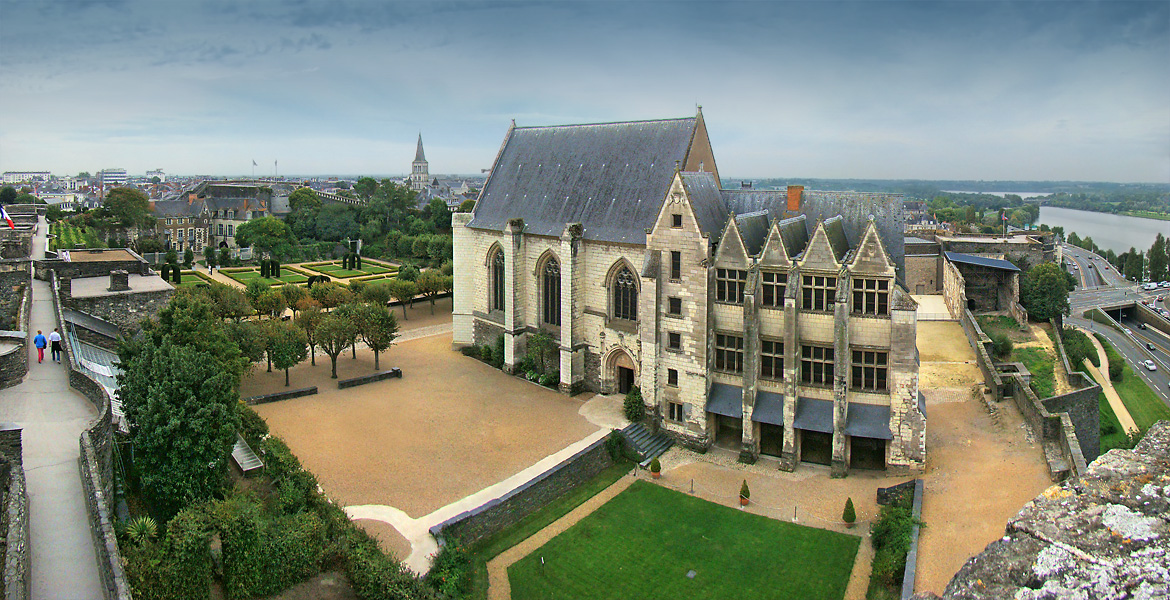
The interior gardens seen from atop the Tour du Moulin in 2008

The Château d'Angers is a castle in the city of Angers in the Loire Valley, in the département of Maine-et-Loire, in France. Founded in the 9th century by the Counts of Anjou, it was expanded to its current size in the 13th century. It is located overhanging the River Maine. It is a listed historical monument since 1875. Now open to the public, the Château d'Angers is home of the Apocalypse Tapestry.

== History ==
Originally, the Château d'Angers was built as a fortress at a site inhabited by the Romans because of its strategic defensive location.

In the 9th century, the Bishop of Angers gave the Counts of Anjou permission to build a castle in Angers. The construction of the first castle begun under Count Fulk III (970–1040), celebrated for his construction of dozens of castles, who built it to protect Anjou from the Normans. It became part of the Angevin Empire of the Plantagenet Kings of England during the 12th century. In 1204, the region was conquered by Philip II and the new castle was constructed during the minority of his grandson, Louis IX ("Saint Louis") in the early part of the 13th century. Louis IX rebuilt the castle in whitestone and black slate, with 17 semicircular towers. The construction undertaken in 1234 cost 4,422 livres, roughly one per cent of the estimated royal revenue at the time. Louis gave the castle to his brother, Charles in 1246.

In 1352, King John II, gave the castle to his second son, Louis who later became count of Anjou. Married to the daughter of the wealthy Charles, Duke of Brittany, Louis had the castle modified, and in 1373 commissioned the famous Apocalypse Tapestry from the painter Hennequin de Bruges and the Parisian tapestry-weaver Nicolas Bataille. Louis II (Louis I's son) and Yolande d'Aragon added a chapel (1405–12) and royal apartments to the complex. The chapel is a sainte chapelle, the name given to churches which enshrined a relic of the Passion. The relic at Angers was a splinter of the fragment of the True Cross which had been acquired by Louis IX.

In the early 15th century, the hapless dauphin who, with the assistance of Joan of Arc would become King Charles VII, had to flee Paris and was given sanctuary at the Château d'Angers.

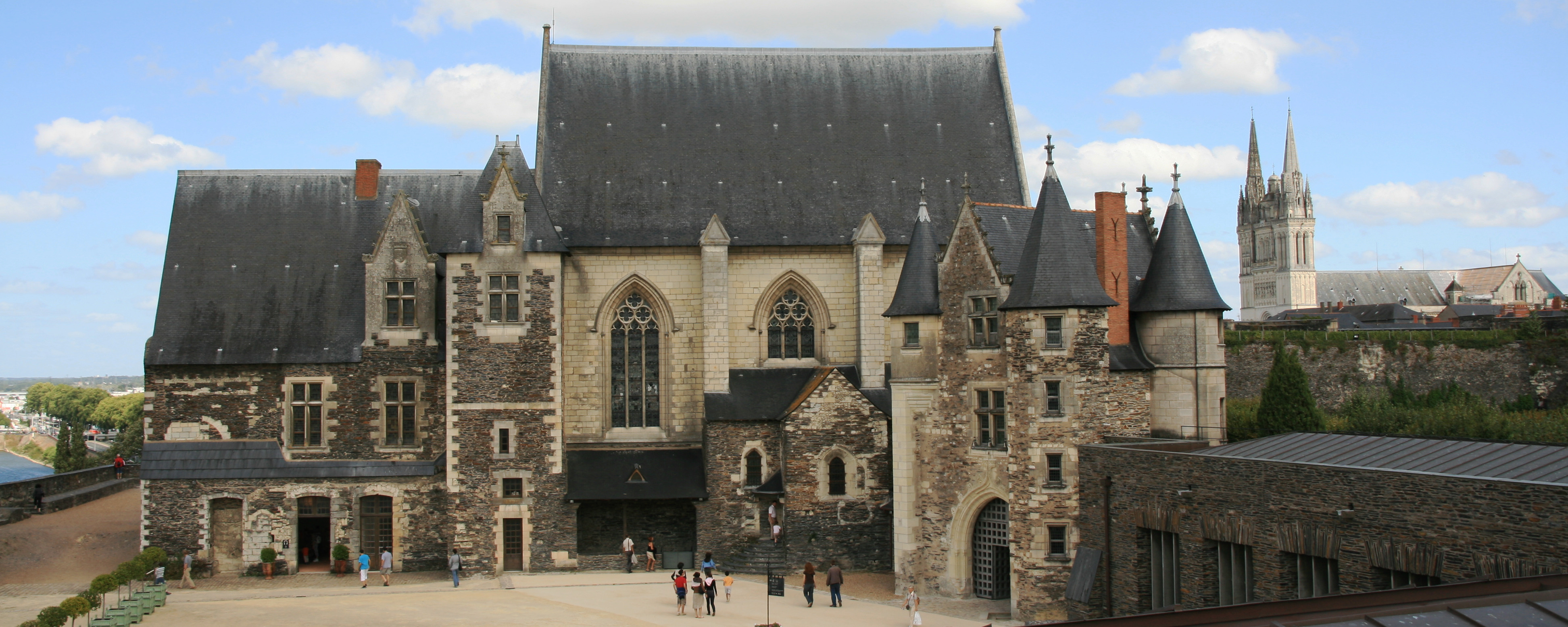
The 15th-century chapel

In 1562, Catherine de' Medici had the castle restored as a powerful fortress, but, her son, Henry III, reduced the height of the towers and had the towers and walls stripped of their embattlements; Henry III used the castle stones to build streets and develop the village of Angers. Nonetheless, under threat of attacks from the Huguenots, the king maintained the castle's defensive capabilities by making it a military outpost and by installing artillery on the château's upper terraces. At the end of the 18th century, as a military garrison, it showed its worth when its thick walls withstood a massive bombardment by cannons from the Vendean army. Unable to do anything else, the rebels simply gave up.

A military academy was established in the castle to train young officers in the strategies of war. Arthur Wellesley, 1st Duke of Wellington, best known for defeating Napoleon Bonaparte at the Battle of Waterloo, was trained at the Military Academy of Angers. The academy was moved to Saumur and the castle was used for the rest of the 19th century as a prison, powder magazine, and barracks.

== Modern ==
The castle continued to be used as an armory through the First and Second World Wars. It was severely damaged during World War II by the Nazis when an ammunition storage dump inside the castle exploded.

On 10 January 2009, the castle suffered severe damage from an accidental fire due to short-circuiting. The Royal Logis, which contains old tomes and administrative offices, was the most heavily damaged part of the château, resulting in 400 square metres (4,300 sq ft) of the roof being completely burnt. The Tapestries of the Apocalypse were not damaged. Total damages were estimated at 2 million Euros. According to Christine Albanel, the Minister of Culture, the expected date of completion for the restoration was the second trimester of 2009.

Today, owned by the City of Angers, the massive, austere castle has been converted to a museum housing the oldest and largest collection of medieval tapestries in the world, with the 14th-century "Apocalypse Tapestry" as one of its priceless treasures. As a tribute to its fortitude, the castle has never been taken by any invading force in history.

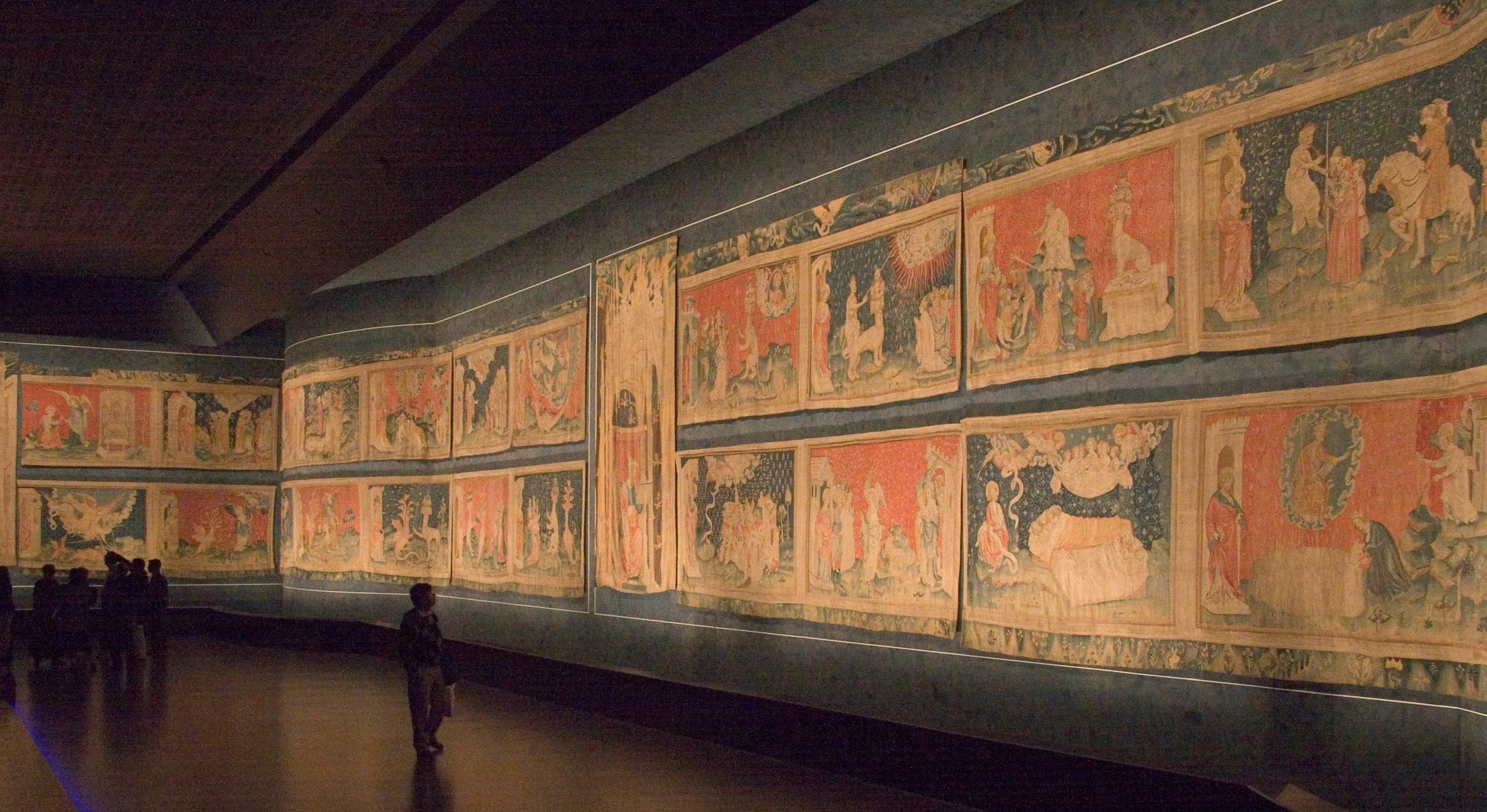
The Apocalypse Tapestry at Château d'Angers

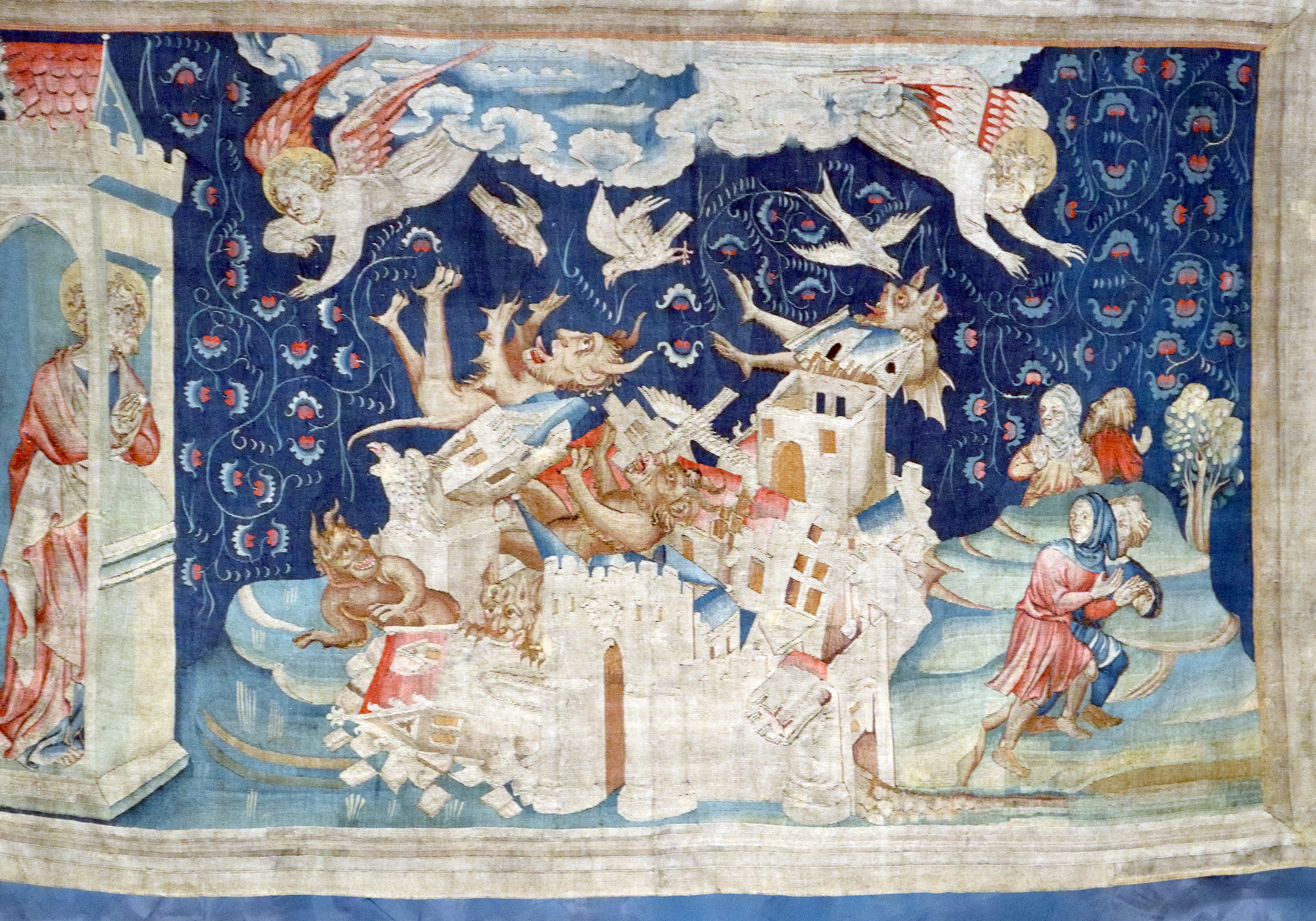

Tourists visiting Château d'Angers
Year	1997	1998	1999	2000	2001	2002
Visitor numbers	173,702	168,806	171,404	170,991	160,583	171,378
Tourist receipts	€597,939	€601,754	€599,258	€553,324	€582,120	€593,759

== Layout ==
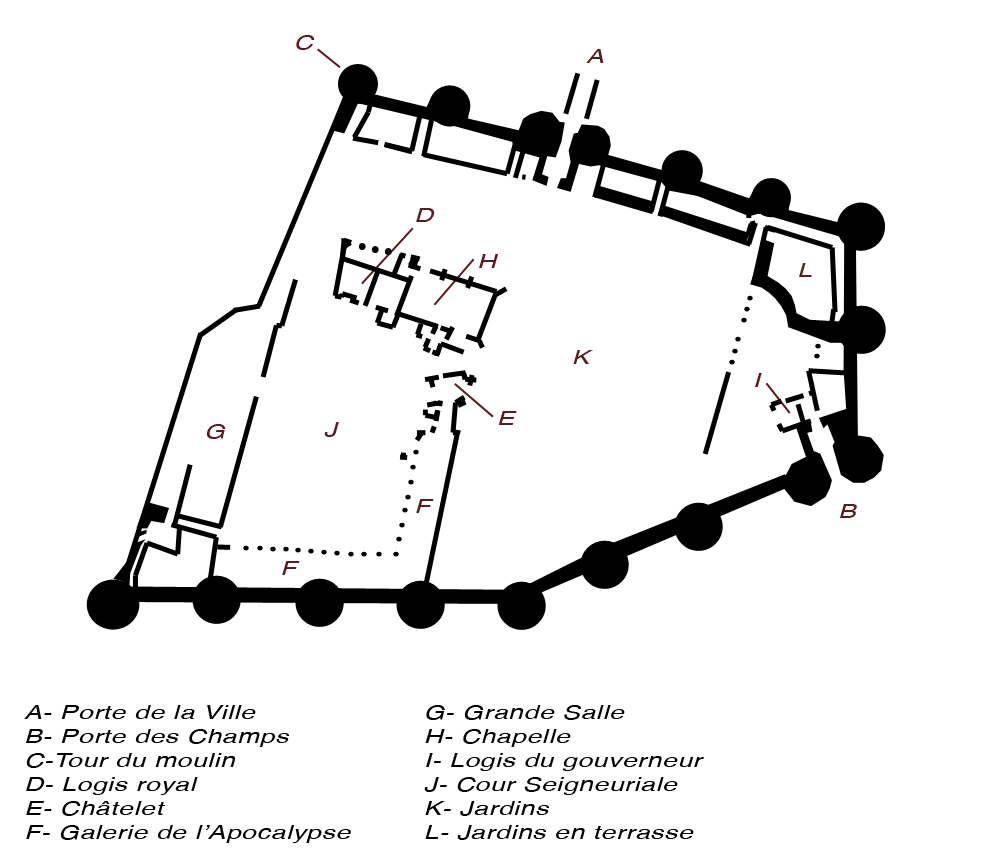
Key: A: gate to the medieval town; B: south gate; C: Tour de moulin; D: royal lodgings; E: chatelet (a type of gatehouse); F: gallery of the Apocalypse Tapestry; G: great hall; H: chapel; I: governor's lodgings; J: inner court; K: gardens; L: terraced gardens

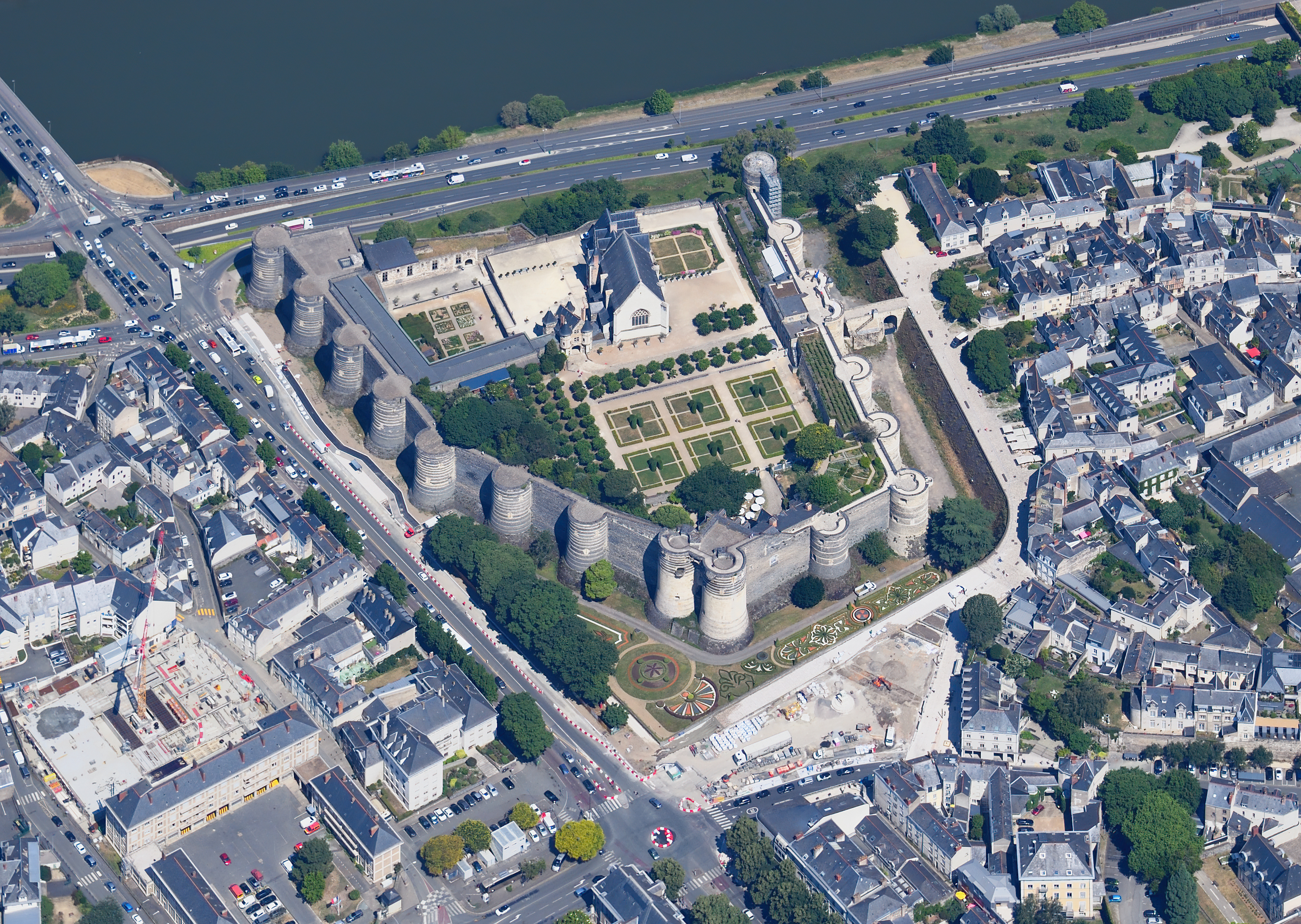
Aerial view

The outer wall is 3 metres (9.8 ft) thick, extends for about 660 m (2,170 ft) and is protected by seventeen massive towers. Each of the perimeter towers measures 18 m (59 ft) in diameter. The château covers an area of 20,000 square metres (220,000 sq ft). Two pairs of towers form the city and landward entrances of the château. Each of the towers was once 40 metres (130 ft) in height, but they were later cut down for the use of artillery pieces. The Tour du Moulin is the only tower which conserves the original elevation.

== Gallery ==
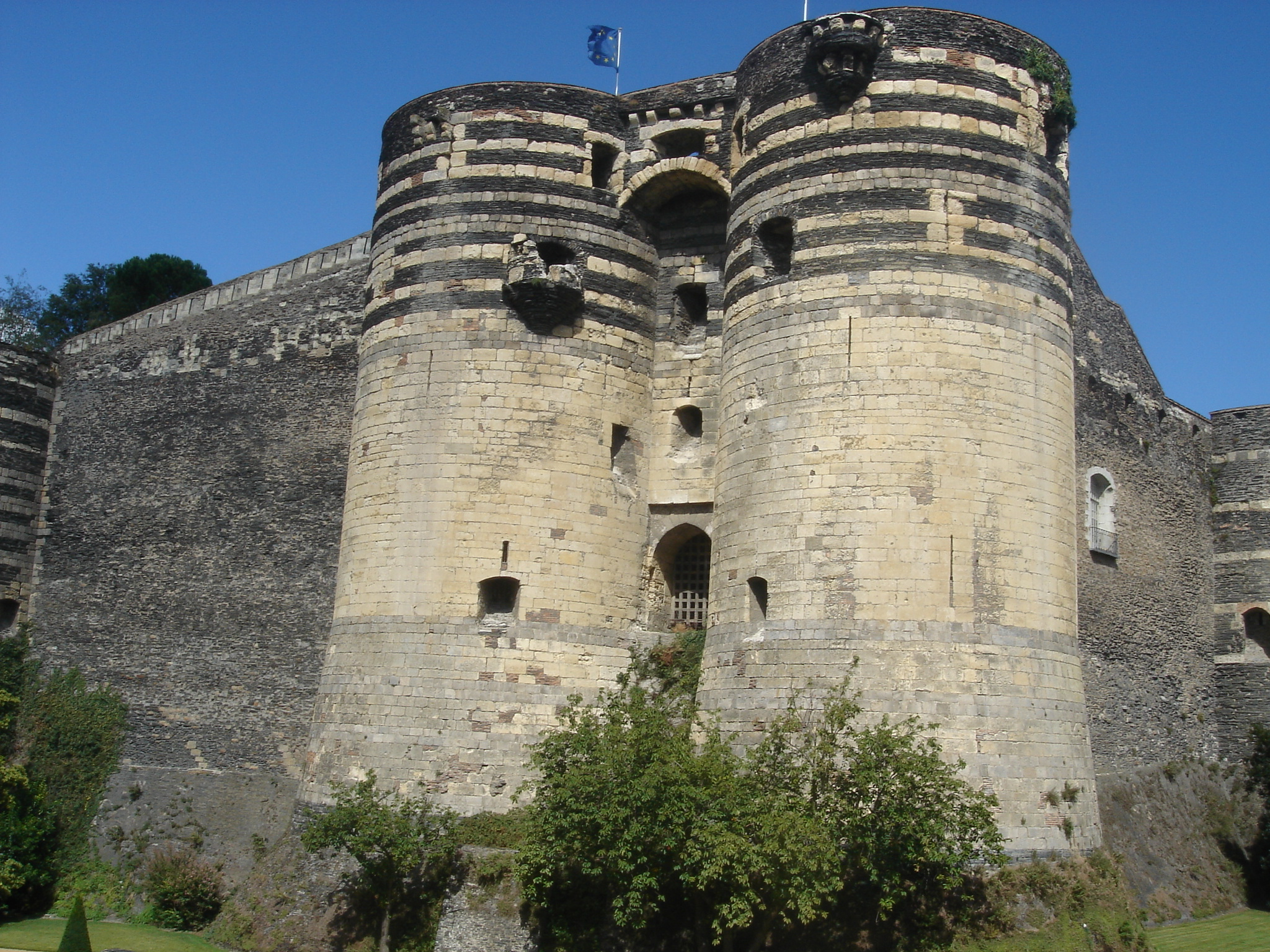
A view of the keep

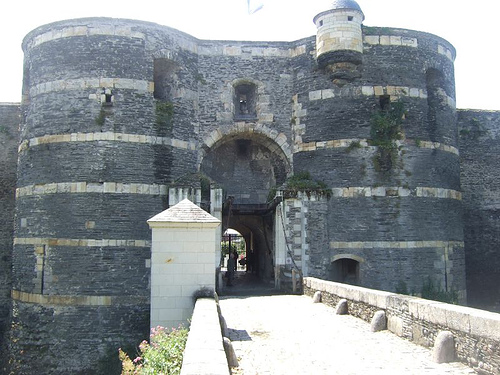
Current entrance of Angers Castle

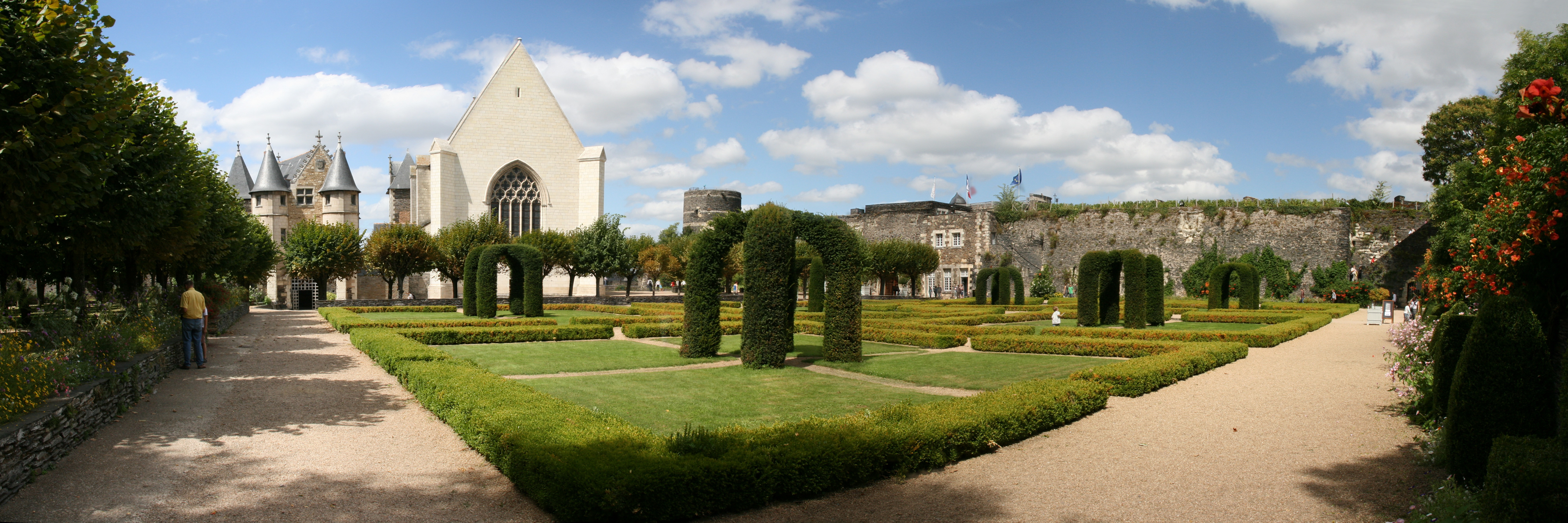
Interior gardens at the Castle

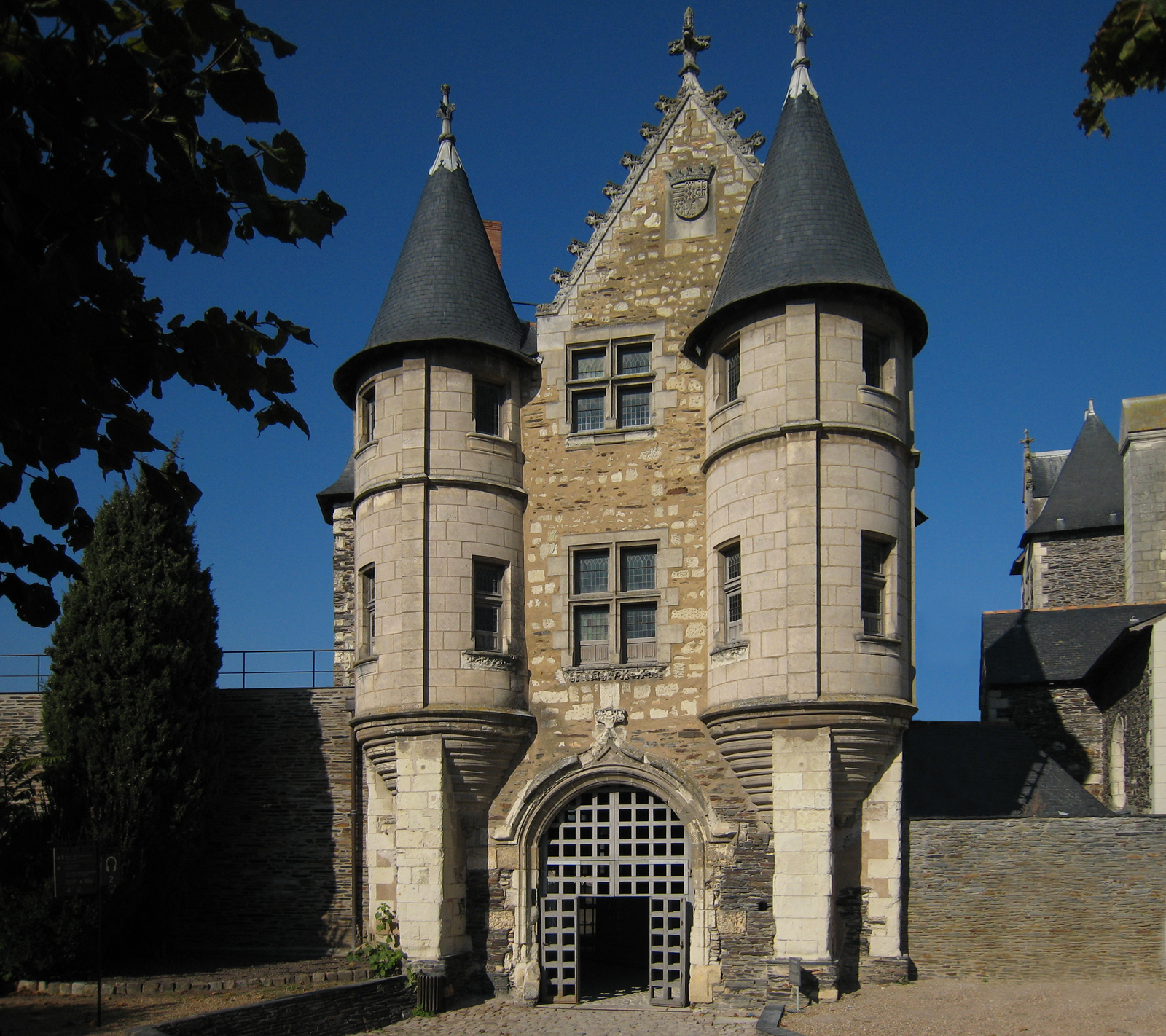
The châtelet controls access to the inner wards

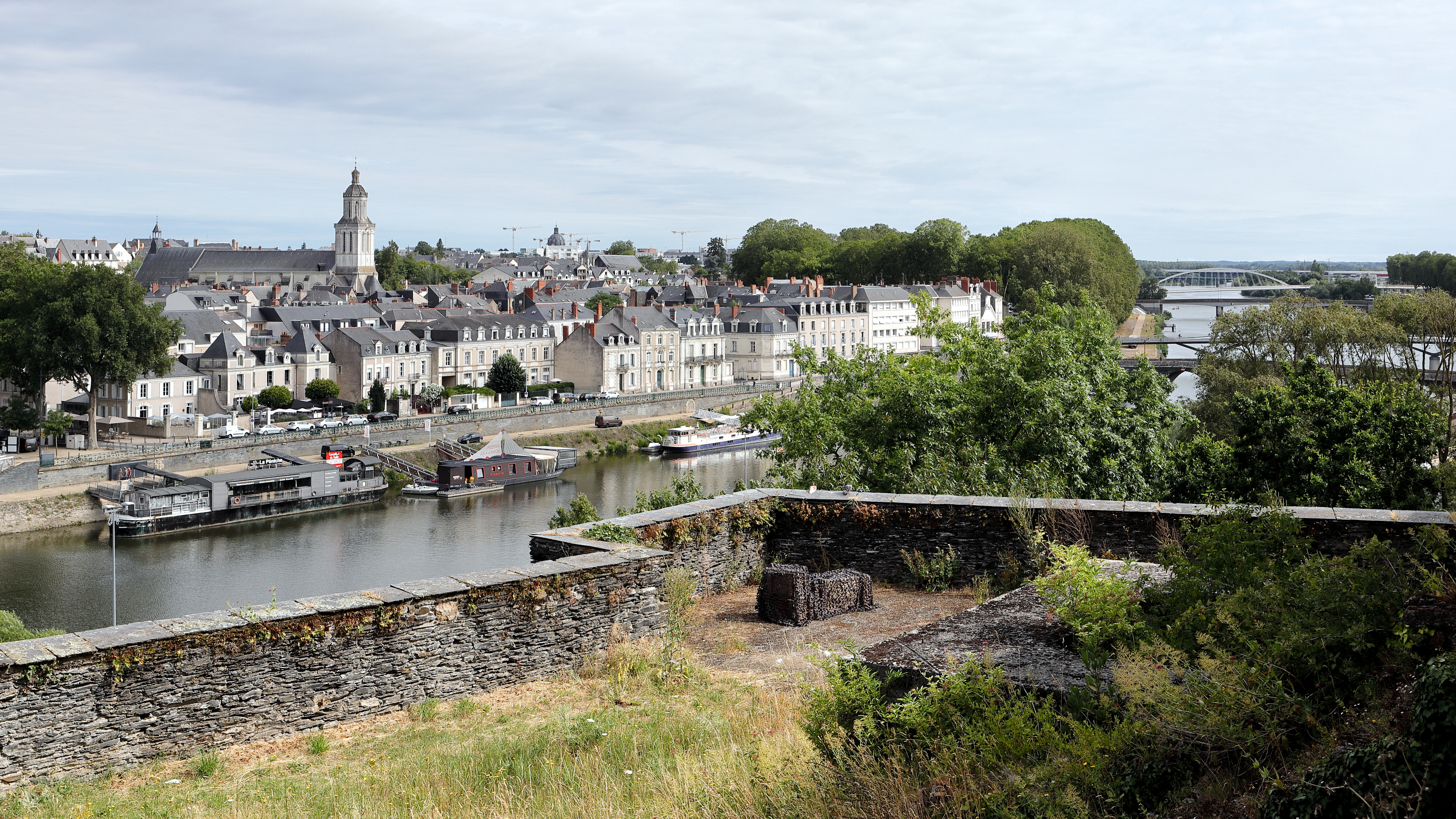
View of the ramparts overlooking the town

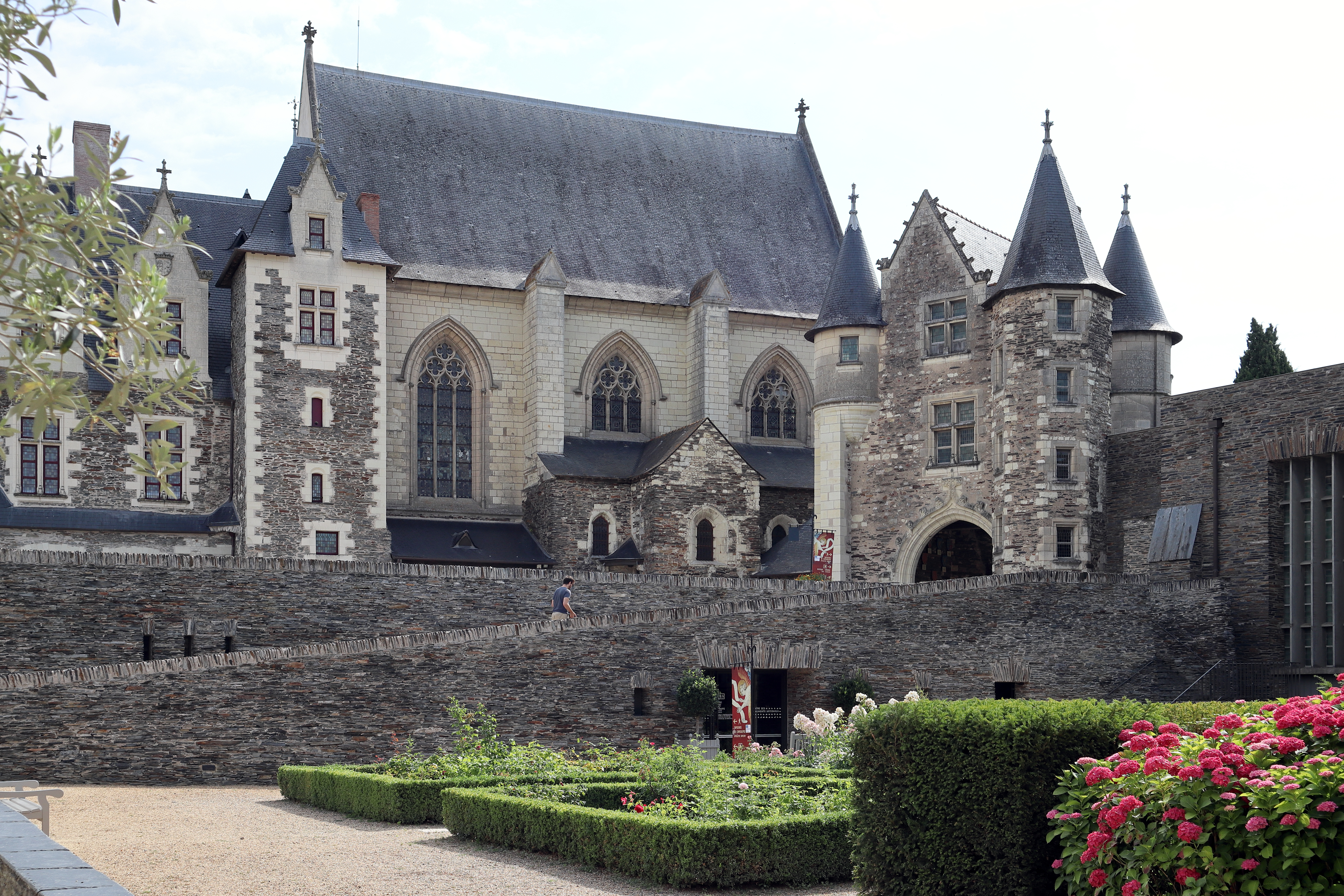
The gatehouse seen from the inner courtyard

== See also ==
- Loire Valley
- List of castles in France
- Apocalypse Tapestry on the French Wikipedia (in French)

== General and cited references ==
- Baynes, T. S., ed. (1878), "Angers" , Encyclopædia Britannica, vol. 2 (9th ed.), New York: Charles Scribner's Sons, p. 29.
- Chisholm, Hugh, ed. (1911), "Angers" , Encyclopædia Britannica, vol. 2 (11th ed.), Cambridge University Press, pp. 8–9.
- Delbos, Claire (2010), La France fortifiée: Châteaux, citadelles et forteresses (in French), Petit Futé, ISBN 978-2-84768-198-7.
- Prestwich, Michael (1980), "Castle Construction", Castles: A History and Guide, Blandford Press, pp. 28–43, ISBN 0-7137-1100-0.
