= Jean Bondol =

14th-century Flemish artist

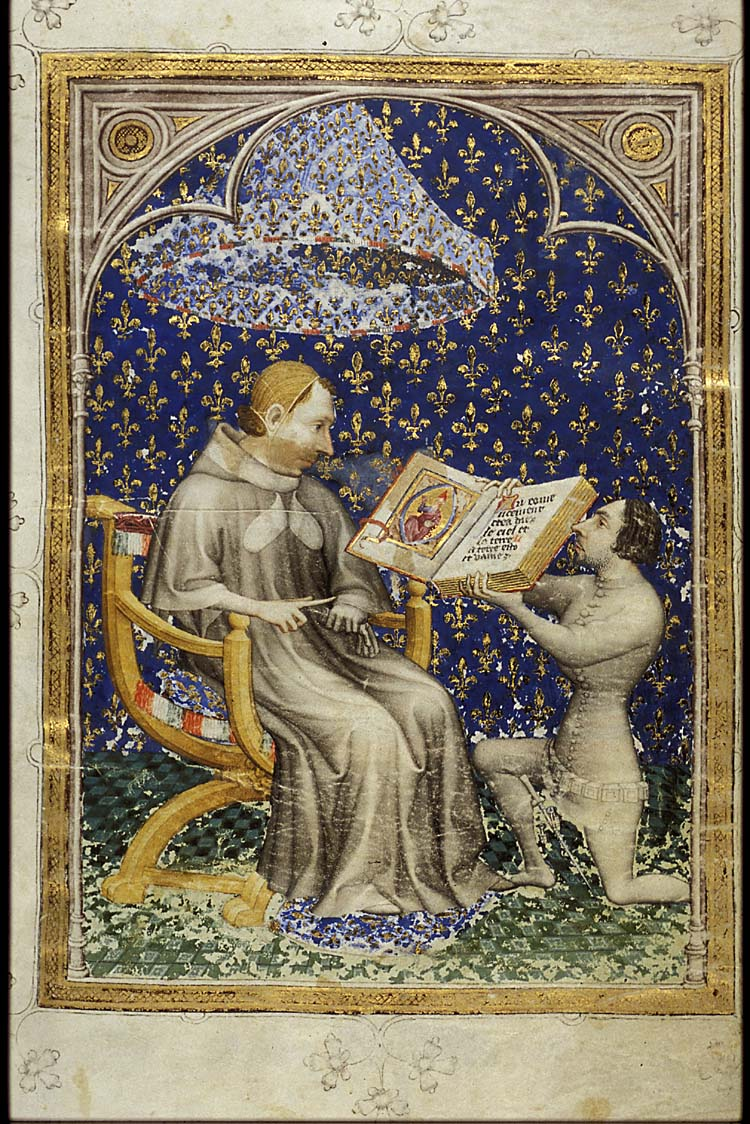
- Occupation: Artist

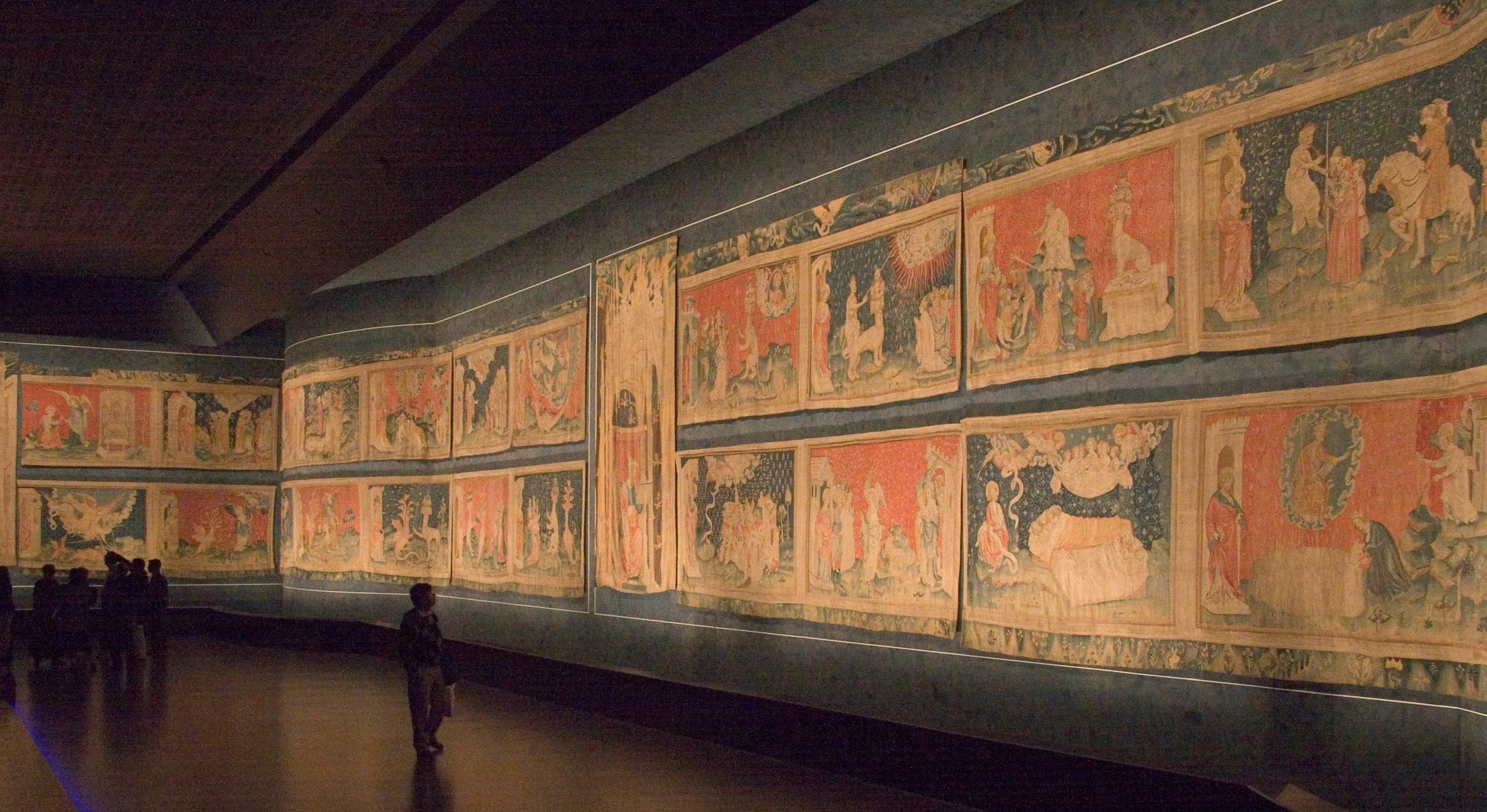
Tapestry of the Apocalypse, in Angers, designed by Jean Bondol.

Jean Bondol, also known as Jean de Bruges, Jean Boudolf, or Jan Baudolf, was a Flemish artist who became a court artist of Charles V of France in 1368. He is documented as active between 1368 and 1381.

He is best known for producing a number of designs for tapestries, of which the only documented survivals are the huge and very important Apocalypse Tapestry series now at Angers. He painted the illuminations for the Bible historiale de Jean de Vaudetar, a translation of the Vulgate which was presented to Charles V by his valet de chambre Jehan Vaudetar. It is now in the Westreen Museum at the Hague. These illuminations were executed in the year 1371, a period when art in the Netherlands was making rapid advances beyond the conventionality of the early 14th century, and the work of Jean de Bruges is by no means behind that of his contemporaries.
