= Jean Mesqui =

French engineer and castellologist (1952–2026)

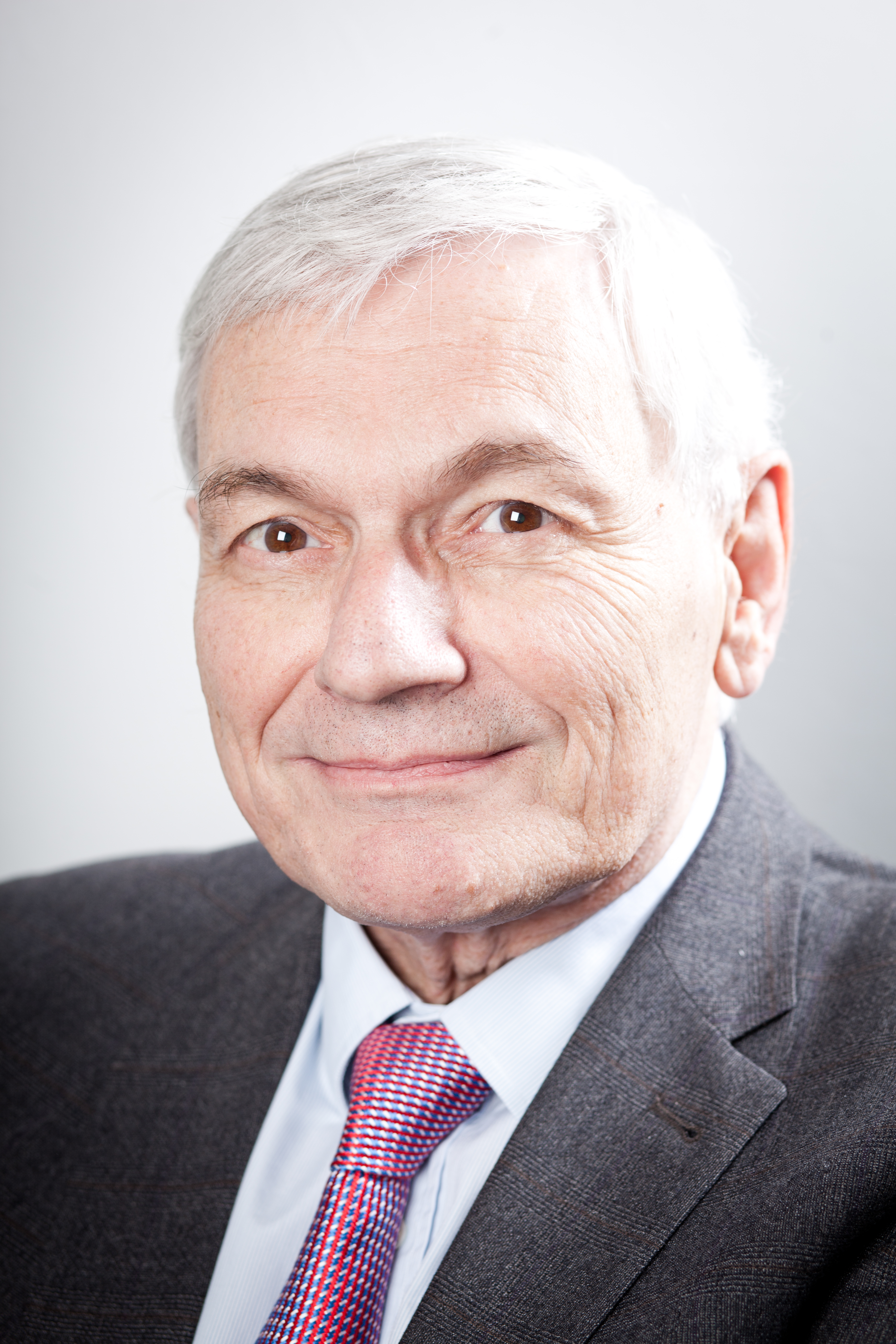
- Born: 27 May 1952; Paris, France
- Died: 24 July 2026 (aged 74)
- Education: École polytechnique
- Occupations: Castellologist, civil engineer, art historian
- Awards: Officer of the Legion of Honor (2010)
- Website: mesqui.net

Jean Mesqui (27 May 1952 – 24 July 2026) was a French engineer, researcher in castle studies, and specialist in the bridges of France.

== Life and career ==
Jean Antoine Marie Joseph Mesqui was born on 27 May 1952, in the 16th arrondissement of Paris.

He studied at the École polytechnique in Paris, and obtained a doctor of letters.

Mesqui was president of the Société des Autoroutes Paris-Normandie and the Société Française d'Archéologie. In 2016–2017, he chaired the Association des sociétés françaises d'autoroutes.

As well as his career as an engineer, Mesqui pursued research on built heritage.

He was an internationally renowned castellologist. He specialised in the study of the most emblematic castles of France and the Middle East. He is also considered a specialist in bridges, in particular those of the Middle Ages.

Mesqui wrote several books on medieval fortified architecture, the history of bridges and roads, and numerous articles.

Mesqui died on 24 July 2026, at the age of 74.

== See also ==
- International Castle Research Society
