= Étang Saint-Nicolas =

Lake in France

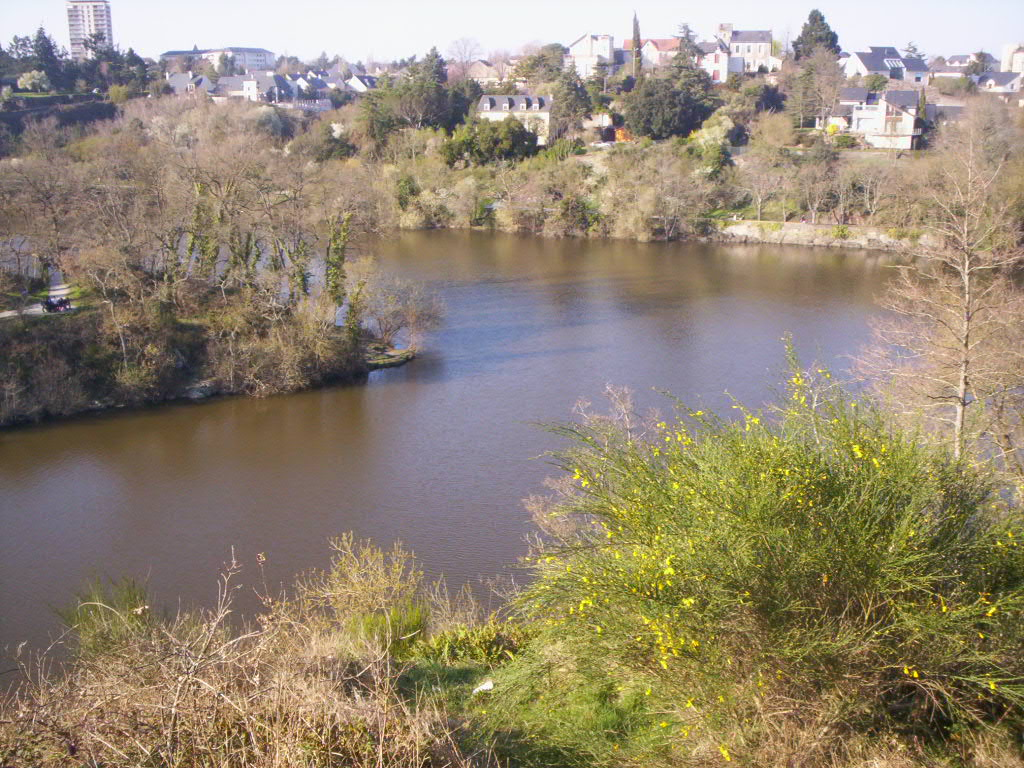

- Location within France
- Location: Angers, Maine-et-Loire
- Coordinates: 47°28′58.3″N 0°35′38.7″W
- Lake type: artificial
- Primary outflows: Brionneau
- Basin countries: France
- Max. length: 3,620 m (11,880 ft)
- Max. width: 100 m (330 ft)
- Surface area: 3.6 ha (8.9 acres)
- Average depth: 1.5 m (4.9 ft)
- Max. depth: 6 m (20 ft)
- Surface elevation: 20 m (66 ft)

Étang Saint-Nicolas is an artificial lake in Angers, Maine-et-Loire, France. Its surface is 3.6 ha.
