= Bleve (disambiguation) =

Bleve or BLEVE may refer to:

- Boiling liquid expanding vapor explosion (BLEVE)
- Marco Bleve, Italian footballer
- B.L.E.V.E., 2005 album by American rapper Kutt Calhoun

== See also ==
- Blèves
