= Saint-Longis =

- Commune
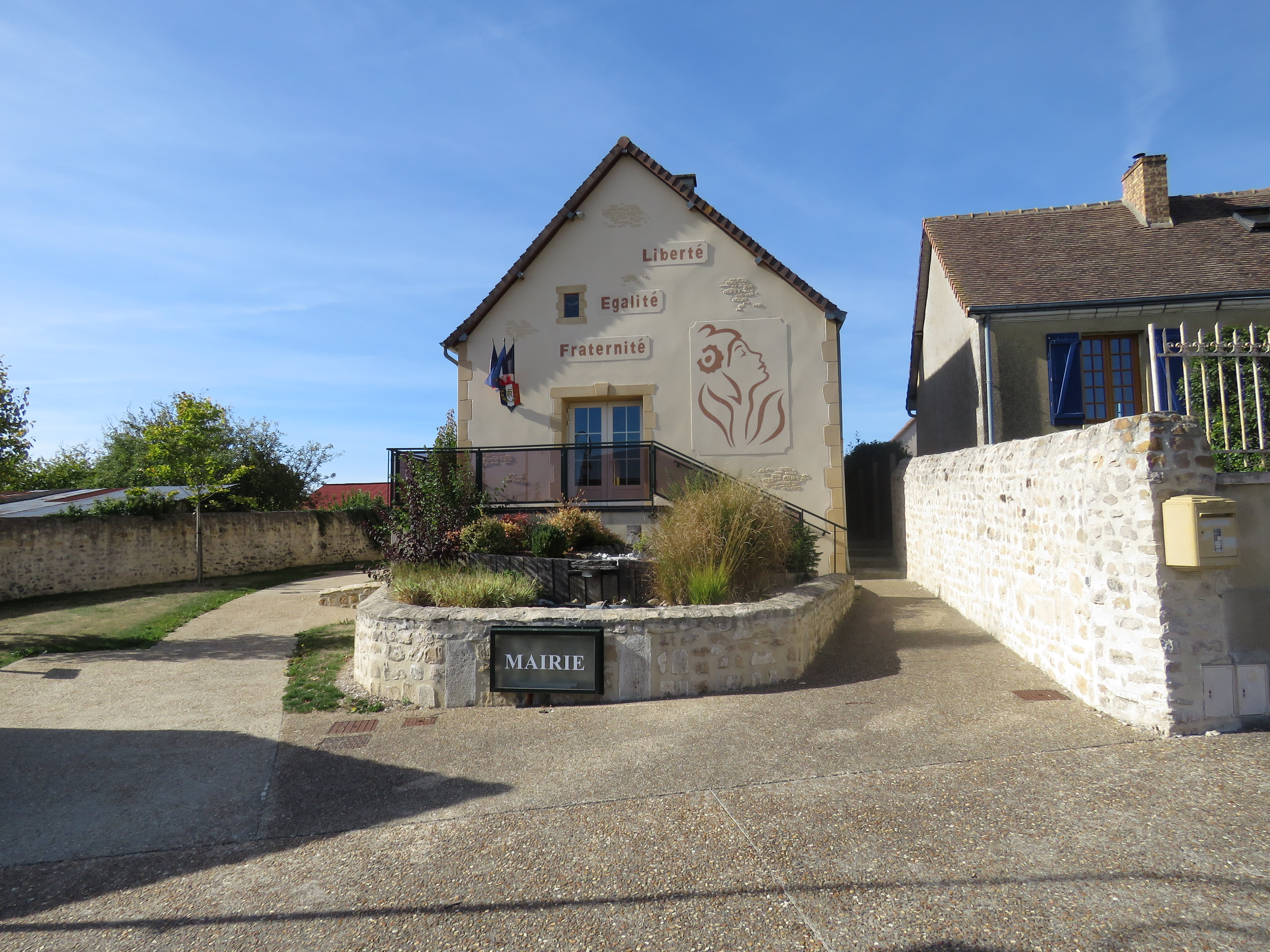
- Saint-Longis Town hall
- Location of Saint-Longis
- Location within France Location within Pays de la Loire
- Coordinates: 48°21′19″N 0°20′45″E
- Country: France
- Region: Pays de la Loire
- Department: Sarthe
- Arrondissement: Mamers
- Canton: Mamers
- Intercommunality: Maine Saosnois

Government
  - Mayor (2020–2026): Léopold Monceaux
- Area^{1}: 11.22 km^{2} (4.33 sq mi)
- Highest elevation: 188 m (617 ft)
- Lowest elevation: 102 m (335 ft)
- Population (2023): 509
  - Density: 45.4/km^{2} (117/sq mi)
- Demonym(s): Longonien, Longonienne
- Time zone: UTC+01:00 (CET)
  - Summer (DST): UTC+02:00 (CEST)
- INSEE/Postal code: 72295 /72600
- ^{1} French Land Register data, which excludes lakes, ponds, glaciers > 1 km^{2} (0.386 sq mi or 247 acres) and river estuaries.

Saint-Longis is a commune in the Sarthe department in the region of Pays de la Loire in north-western France.

== See also ==
- Communes of the Sarthe department
