= Louzes =

- Commune
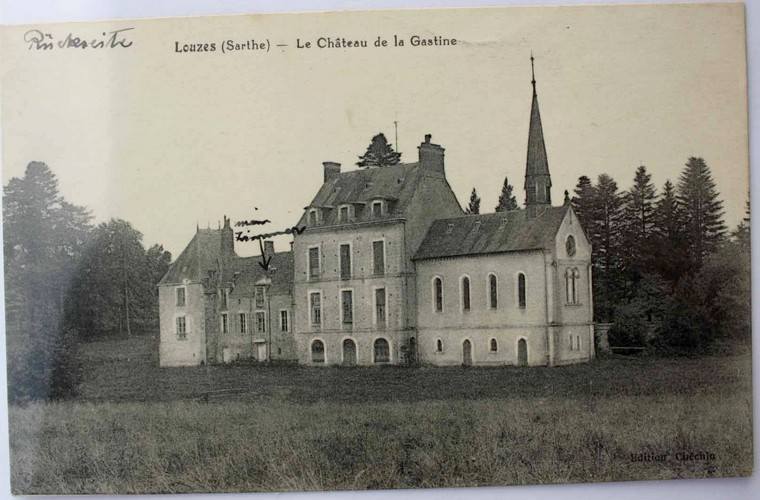
- The chateau of La Gastine in 1920
- Location of Louzes
- Location within France Location within Pays de la Loire
- Coordinates: 48°25′43″N 0°18′10″E
- Country: France
- Region: Pays de la Loire
- Department: Sarthe
- Arrondissement: Mamers
- Canton: Mamers
- Intercommunality: Maine Saosnois

Government
  - Mayor (2020–2026): Guy-René de Piepape
- Area^{1}: 8.3 km^{2} (3.2 sq mi)
- Population (2023): 103
  - Density: 12/km^{2} (32/sq mi)
- Time zone: UTC+01:00 (CET)
  - Summer (DST): UTC+02:00 (CEST)
- INSEE/Postal code: 72171 /72670, 72600
- ^{1} French Land Register data, which excludes lakes, ponds, glaciers > 1 km^{2} (0.386 sq mi or 247 acres) and river estuaries.

Louzes (French pronunciation: [luz]) is a commune in the Sarthe department in the region of Pays de la Loire in north-western France.

== See also ==
- Communes of the Sarthe department
- Parc naturel régional Normandie-Maine
