= Saint-Aignan, Sarthe =

Saint-Aignan
- Commune
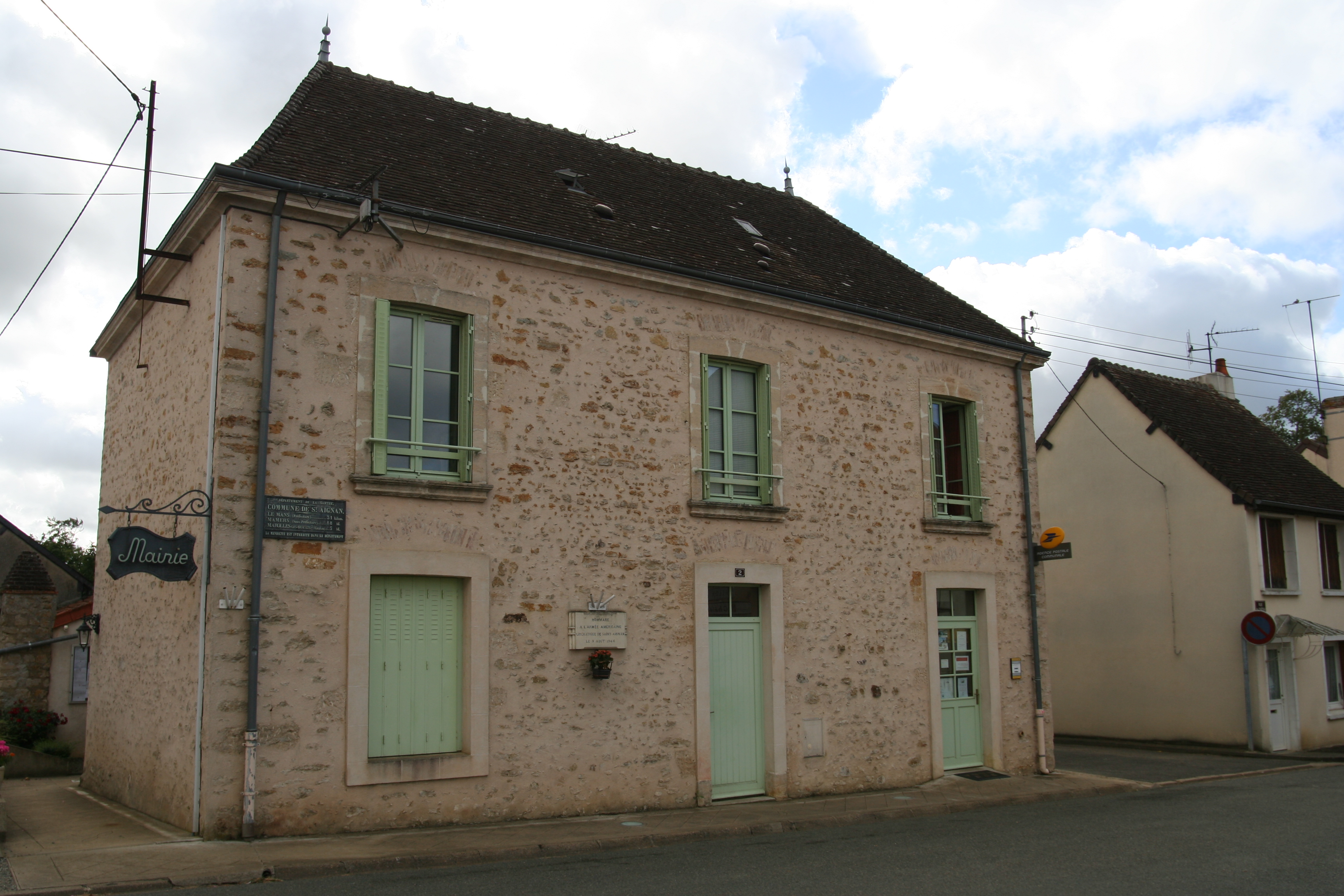
- The town hall of Saint-Aignan
- Location of Saint-Aignan
- Location within France Location within Pays de la Loire
- Coordinates: 48°13′00″N 0°21′00″E
- Country: France
- Region: Pays de la Loire
- Department: Sarthe
- Arrondissement: Mamers
- Canton: Mamers
- Intercommunality: Maine Saosnois

Government
  - Mayor (2020–2026): Éric De Vilmarest
- Area^{1}: 15.13 km^{2} (5.84 sq mi)
- Population (2023): 264
  - Density: 17.4/km^{2} (45.2/sq mi)
- Demonym(s): Saint-Aignanais, Saint-Aignanaise
- Time zone: UTC+01:00 (CET)
  - Summer (DST): UTC+02:00 (CEST)
- INSEE/Postal code: 72265 /72110
- ^{1} French Land Register data, which excludes lakes, ponds, glaciers > 1 km^{2} (0.386 sq mi or 247 acres) and river estuaries.

Saint-Aignan (French pronunciation: [sɛ̃.t‿ɛɲɑ̃]) is a commune in the Sarthe department in the region of Pays de la Loire in north-western France.

== See also ==
- Communes of the Sarthe department
