= Panon, Sarthe =

Panon
- Commune
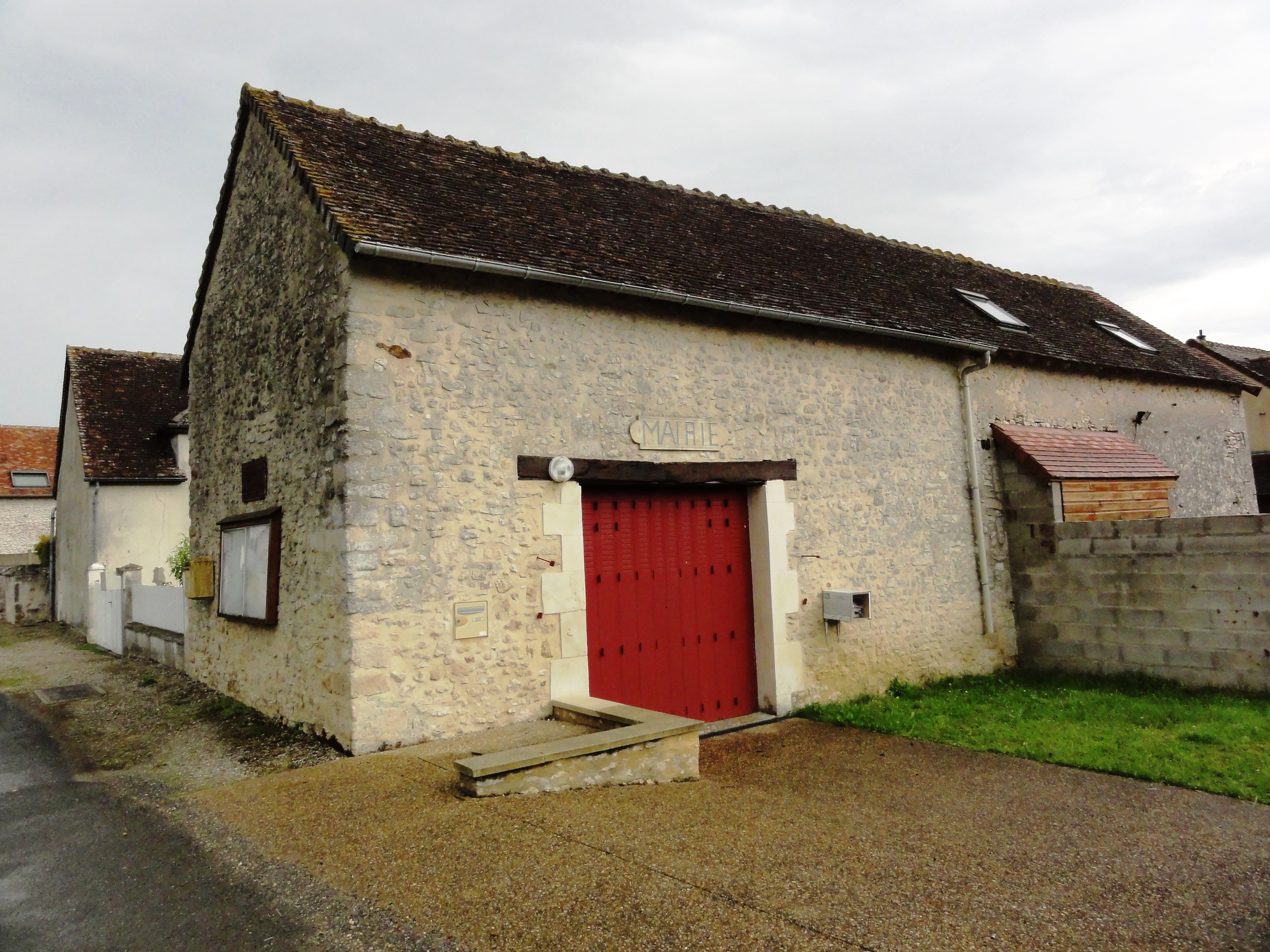
- Panon Town hall
- Location of Panon
- Location within France Location within Pays de la Loire
- Coordinates: 48°20′19″N 0°17′41″E
- Country: France
- Region: Pays de la Loire
- Department: Sarthe
- Arrondissement: Mamers
- Canton: Mamers
- Intercommunality: Maine Saosnois

Government
  - Mayor (2020–2026): Christophe Loiseau
- Area^{1}: 2.37 km^{2} (0.92 sq mi)
- Highest elevation: 147 m (482 ft)
- Lowest elevation: 112 m (367 ft)
- Population (2023): 33
  - Density: 14/km^{2} (36/sq mi)
- Time zone: UTC+01:00 (CET)
  - Summer (DST): UTC+02:00 (CEST)
- INSEE/Postal code: 72227 /72600
- ^{1} French Land Register data, which excludes lakes, ponds, glaciers > 1 km^{2} (0.386 sq mi or 247 acres) and river estuaries.

Panon (French pronunciation: [panɔ̃]) is a commune in the Sarthe department in the region of Pays de la Loire in north-western France.

== See also ==
- Communes of the Sarthe department
