= Saint-Calez-en-Saosnois =

- Commune
- Location of Saint-Calez-en-Saosnois
- Location within France Location within Pays de la Loire
- Coordinates: 48°18′46″N 0°18′17″E
- Country: France
- Region: Pays de la Loire
- Department: Sarthe
- Arrondissement: Mamers
- Canton: Mamers
- Intercommunality: Maine Saosnois

Government
  - Mayor (2020–2026): Jean-Marie Cenée
- Area^{1}: 7.19 km^{2} (2.78 sq mi)
- Highest elevation: 156 m (512 ft)
- Lowest elevation: 83 m (272 ft)
- Population (2023): 179
  - Density: 24.9/km^{2} (64.5/sq mi)
- Demonym(s): Calézien, Calézienne
- Time zone: UTC+01:00 (CET)
  - Summer (DST): UTC+02:00 (CEST)
- INSEE/Postal code: 72270 /72600
- ^{1} French Land Register data, which excludes lakes, ponds, glaciers > 1 km^{2} (0.386 sq mi or 247 acres) and river estuaries.

Saint-Calez-en-Saosnois is a commune in the Sarthe department in the region of Pays de la Loire in north-western France.

== See also ==
- Communes of the Sarthe department
