= Louvigny, Sarthe =

Louvigny
- Commune
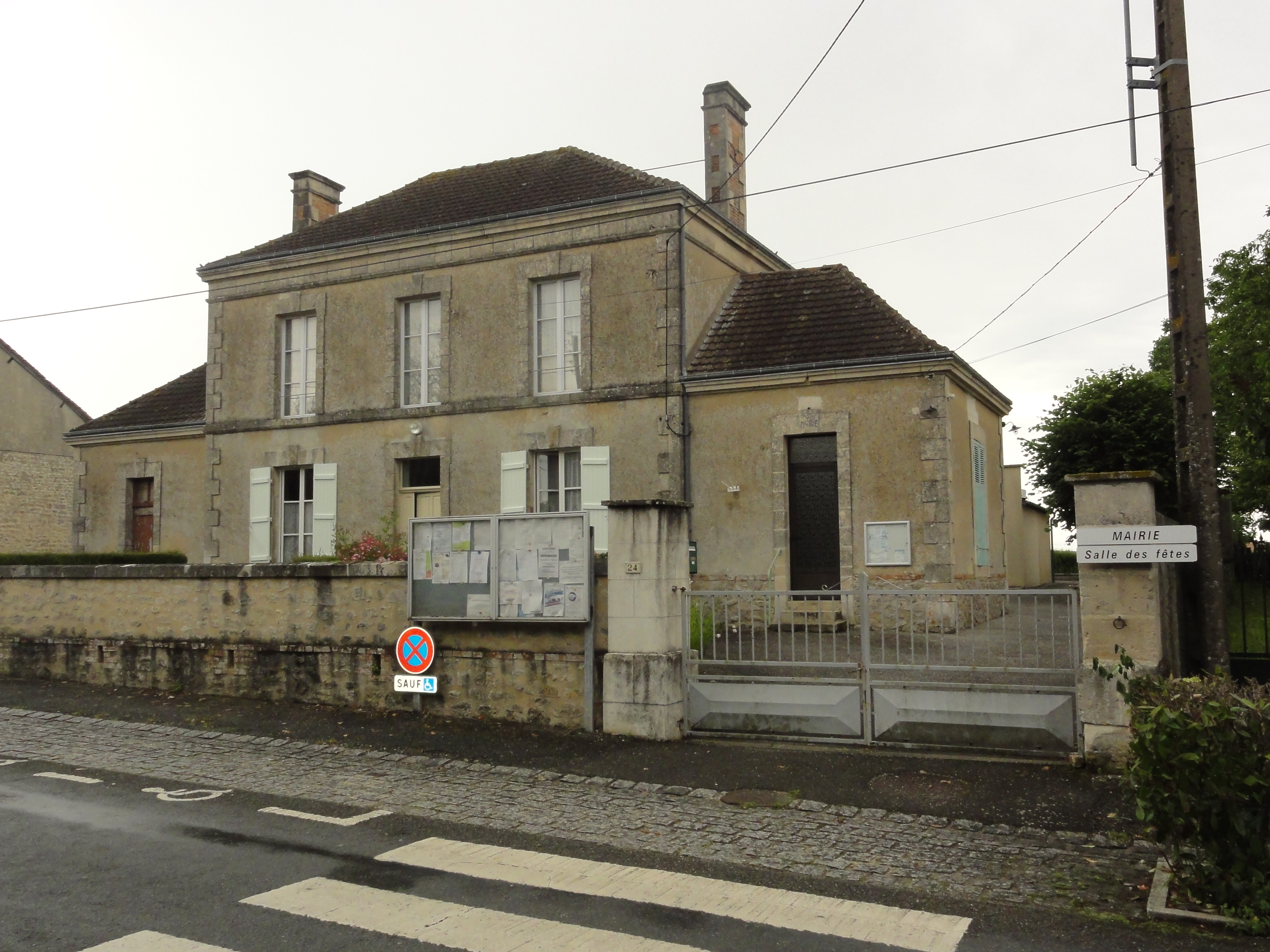
- Louvigny Town hall
- Location of Louvigny
- Location within France Location within Pays de la Loire
- Coordinates: 48°20′20″N 0°12′10″E
- Country: France
- Region: Pays de la Loire
- Department: Sarthe
- Arrondissement: Mamers
- Canton: Mamers
- Intercommunality: Maine Saosnois

Government
  - Mayor (2020–2026): Olivier Mauraisin
- Area^{1}: 8.7 km^{2} (3.4 sq mi)
- Population (2023): 178
  - Density: 20/km^{2} (53/sq mi)
- Demonym(s): Louvinois, Louvinoise
- Time zone: UTC+01:00 (CET)
  - Summer (DST): UTC+02:00 (CEST)
- INSEE/Postal code: 72170 /72600
- ^{1} French Land Register data, which excludes lakes, ponds, glaciers > 1 km^{2} (0.386 sq mi or 247 acres) and river estuaries.

Louvigny (French pronunciation: [luviɲi]) is a commune in the Sarthe department in the region of Pays de la Loire in north-western France.

== See also ==
- Communes of the Sarthe department
