= Marollette =

- Commune
- Location of Marollette
- Location within France Location within Pays de la Loire
- Coordinates: 48°22′14″N 0°21′07″E
- Country: France
- Region: Pays de la Loire
- Department: Sarthe
- Arrondissement: Mamers
- Canton: Mamers
- Intercommunality: Maine Saosnois

Government
  - Mayor (2020–2026): Jacqueline Triger
- Area^{1}: 5.70 km^{2} (2.20 sq mi)
- Highest elevation: 189 m (620 ft)
- Lowest elevation: 118 m (387 ft)
- Population (2023): 159
  - Density: 27.9/km^{2} (72.2/sq mi)
- Demonym(s): Marollettin, Marollettine
- Time zone: UTC+01:00 (CET)
  - Summer (DST): UTC+02:00 (CEST)
- INSEE/Postal code: 72188 /72600
- ^{1} French Land Register data, which excludes lakes, ponds, glaciers > 1 km^{2} (0.386 sq mi or 247 acres) and river estuaries.

Marollette (French pronunciation: [maʁɔlɛt]) is a commune in the Sarthe department in the region of Pays de la Loire in north-western France.

== See also ==
- Communes of the Sarthe department
