= Canton of Mamers =

Coordinates: 48.35°N 0.37°E

The canton of Mamers is an administrative division of the Sarthe department, northwestern France. Its borders were modified at the French canton reorganisation which came into effect in March 2015. Its seat is in Mamers.

It consists of the following communes:

1. Aillières-Beauvoir
2. Arçonnay
3. Les Aulneaux
4. Avesnes-en-Saosnois
5. Blèves
6. Champfleur
7. Chenay
8. Commerveil
9. Congé-sur-Orne
10. Contilly
11. Courgains
12. Dangeul
13. Louvigny
14. Louzes
15. Lucé-sous-Ballon
16. Mamers
17. Marollette
18. Marolles-les-Braults
19. Les Mées
20. Meurcé
21. Mézières-sur-Ponthouin
22. Moncé-en-Saosnois
23. Monhoudou
24. Nauvay
25. Neufchâtel-en-Saosnois
26. Nouans
27. Panon
28. Peray
29. Pizieux
30. René
31. Saint-Aignan
32. Saint-Calez-en-Saosnois
33. Saint-Cosme-en-Vairais
34. Saint-Longis
35. Saint Paterne - Le Chevain
36. Saint-Pierre-des-Ormes
37. Saint-Rémy-des-Monts
38. Saint-Rémy-du-Val
39. Saint-Vincent-des-Prés
40. Saosnes
41. Thoigné
42. Vezot
43. Villaines-la-Carelle
44. Villeneuve-en-Perseigne
