= Lucé-sous-Ballon =

- Commune
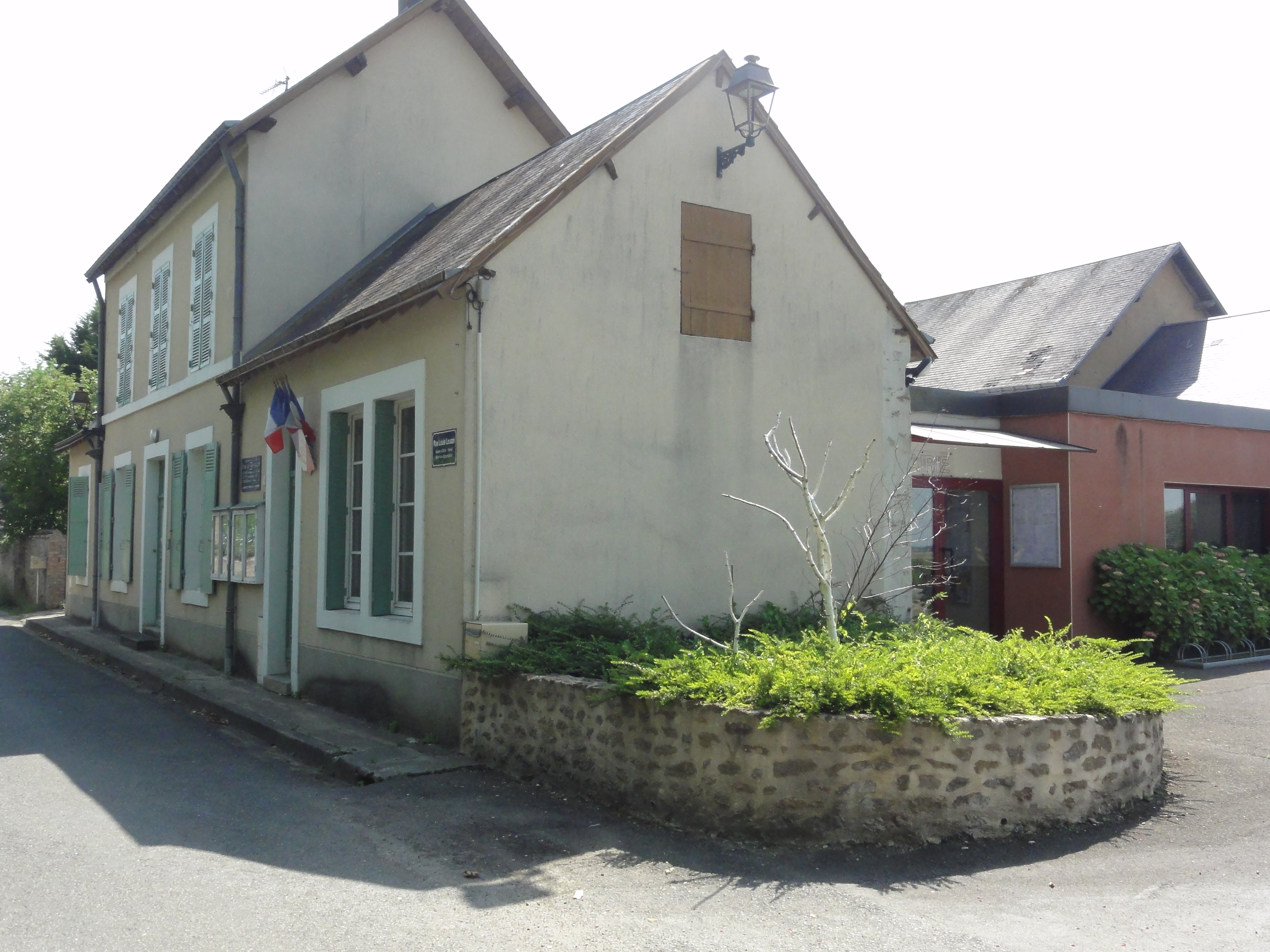
- Lucé-sous-Ballon Town hall
- Location of Lucé-sous-Ballon
- Location within France Location within Pays de la Loire
- Coordinates: 48°12′21″N 0°12′58″E
- Country: France
- Region: Pays de la Loire
- Department: Sarthe
- Arrondissement: Mamers
- Canton: Mamers
- Intercommunality: Maine Saosnois

Government
  - Mayor (2020–2026): Jean-Yves Letay
- Area^{1}: 6.78 km^{2} (2.62 sq mi)
- Population (2023): 108
  - Density: 15.9/km^{2} (41.3/sq mi)
- Demonym(s): Lucéen, Lucéenne
- Time zone: UTC+01:00 (CET)
  - Summer (DST): UTC+02:00 (CEST)
- INSEE/Postal code: 72174 /72290
- ^{1} French Land Register data, which excludes lakes, ponds, glaciers > 1 km^{2} (0.386 sq mi or 247 acres) and river estuaries.

Lucé-sous-Ballon (French pronunciation: [lyse su balɔ̃], literally Lucé under Ballon) is a commune in the Sarthe department in the region of Pays de la Loire in north-western France.

== See also ==
- Communes of the Sarthe department
