= Nouans =

- Commune
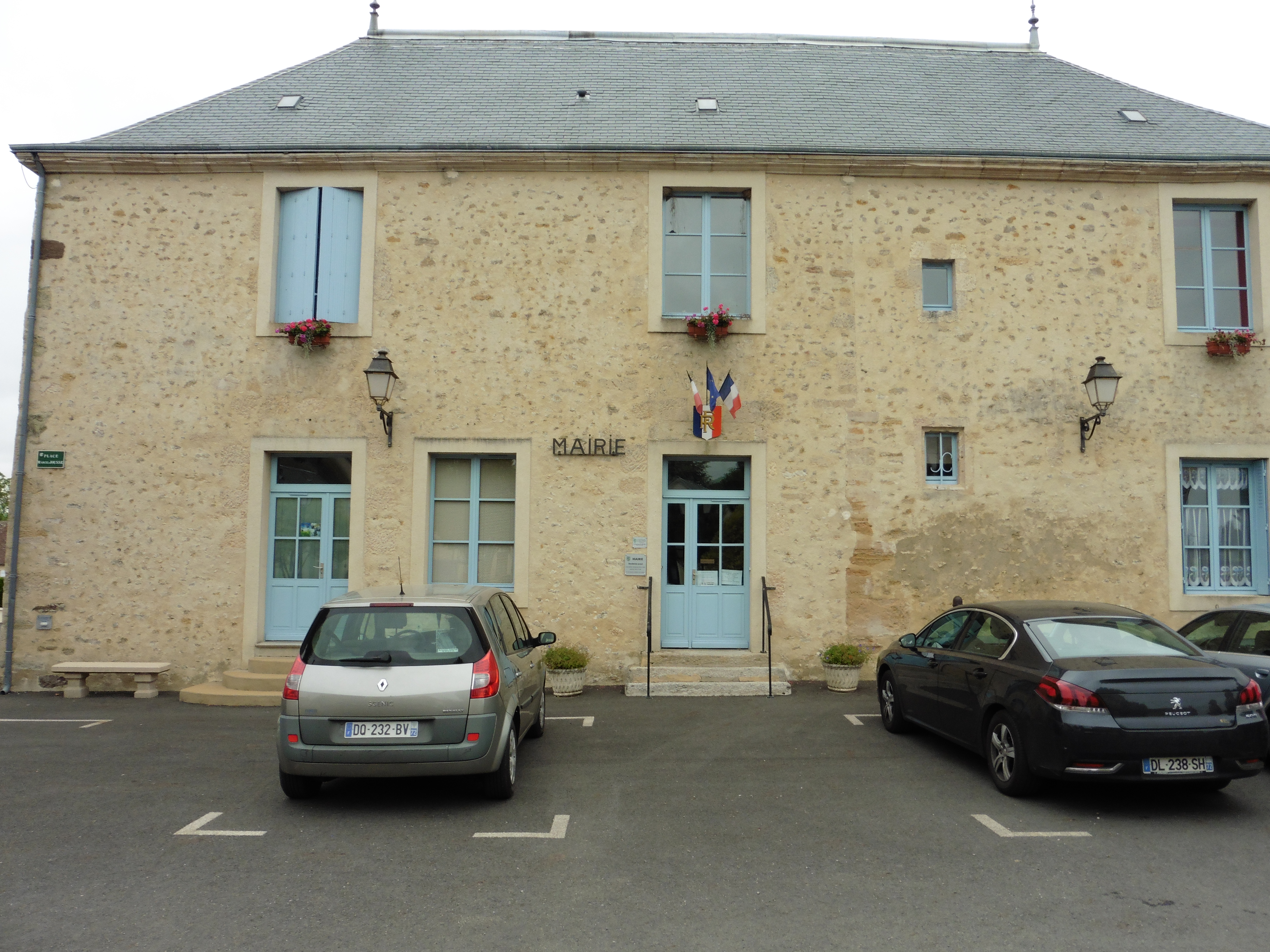
- The town hall of Nouans

- Coat of arms
- Location of Nouans
- Location within France Location within Pays de la Loire
- Coordinates: 48°14′19″N 0°13′19″E
- Country: France
- Region: Pays de la Loire
- Department: Sarthe
- Arrondissement: Mamers
- Canton: Mamers
- Intercommunality: Maine Saosnois

Government
  - Mayor (2020–2026): Claude Morin
- Area^{1}: 9.6 km^{2} (3.7 sq mi)
- Population (2023): 252
  - Density: 26/km^{2} (68/sq mi)
- Demonym(s): Nouantais, Nouantaise
- Time zone: UTC+01:00 (CET)
  - Summer (DST): UTC+02:00 (CEST)
- INSEE/Postal code: 72222 /72260
- ^{1} French Land Register data, which excludes lakes, ponds, glaciers > 1 km^{2} (0.386 sq mi or 247 acres) and river estuaries.

Nouans (French pronunciation: [nwɑ̃]) is a commune in the Sarthe department in the region of Pays de la Loire in north-western France.

== See also ==
- Communes of the Sarthe department
