= Pizieux =

- Commune
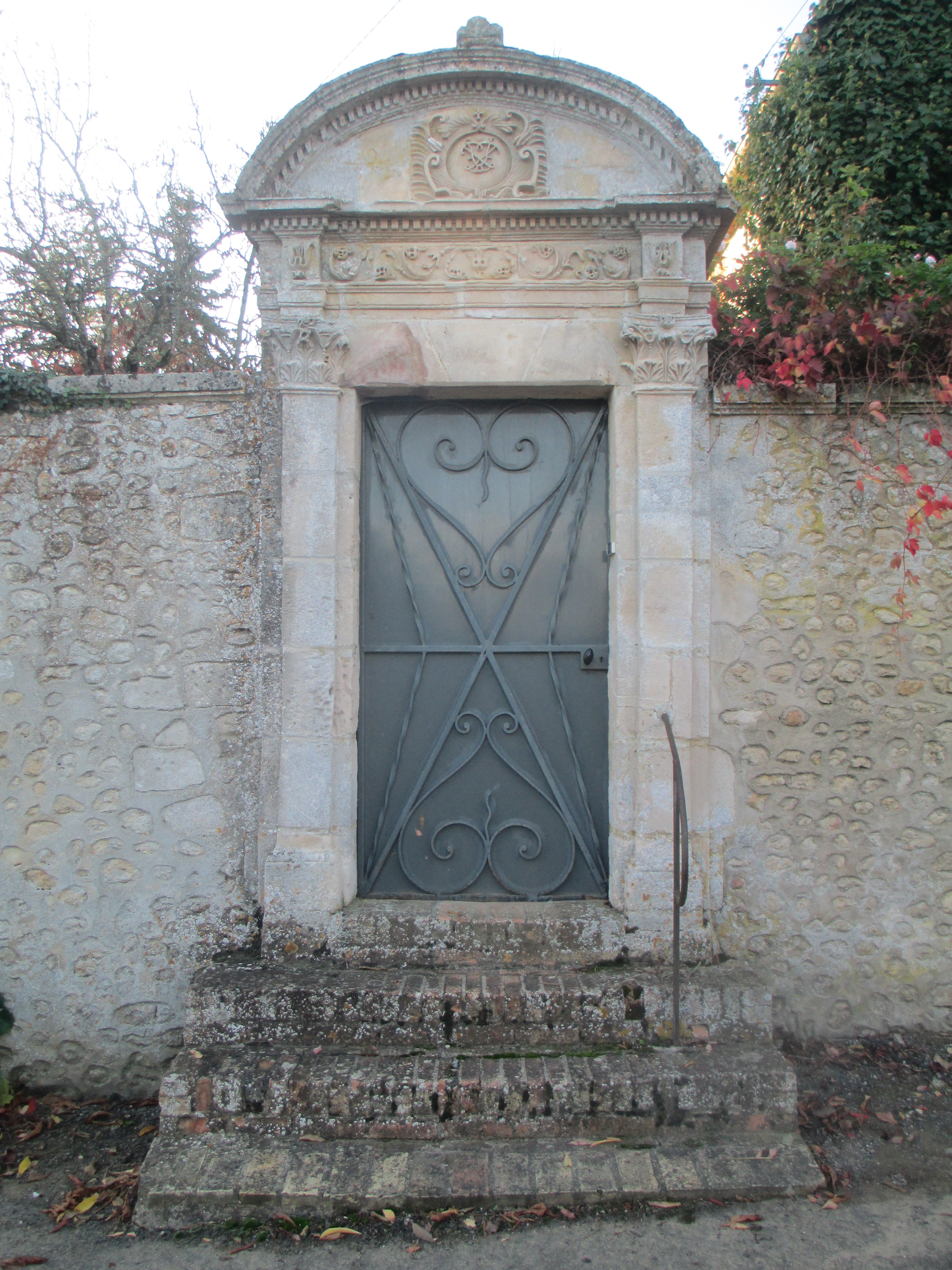
- The gate of the presbytery of Pizieux
- Location of Pizieux
- Location within France Location within Pays de la Loire
- Coordinates: 48°19′20″N 0°19′52″E
- Country: France
- Region: Pays de la Loire
- Department: Sarthe
- Arrondissement: Mamers
- Canton: Mamers
- Intercommunality: Maine Saosnois

Government
  - Mayor (2020–2026): Jean Mulot
- Area^{1}: 4.51 km^{2} (1.74 sq mi)
- Highest elevation: 168 m (551 ft)
- Lowest elevation: 88 m (289 ft)
- Population (2023): 75
  - Density: 17/km^{2} (43/sq mi)
- Time zone: UTC+01:00 (CET)
  - Summer (DST): UTC+02:00 (CEST)
- INSEE/Postal code: 72238 /72600
- ^{1} French Land Register data, which excludes lakes, ponds, glaciers > 1 km^{2} (0.386 sq mi or 247 acres) and river estuaries.

Pizieux (French pronunciation: [pizjø]) is a commune in the Sarthe department in the region of Pays de la Loire in north-western France.

== See also ==
- Communes of the Sarthe department
