= Aillières-Beauvoir =

- Commune
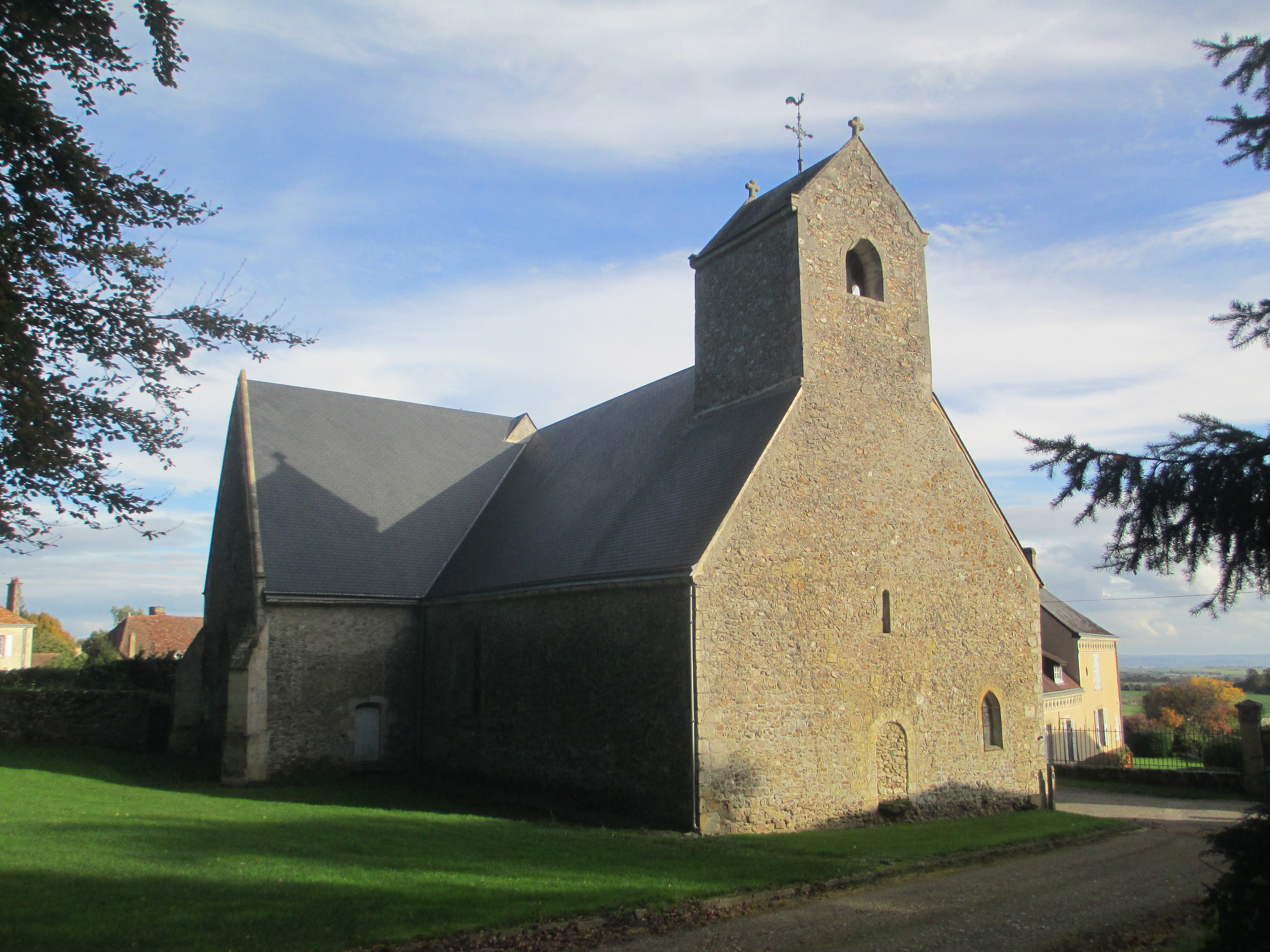
- The church of Saint-Denis d'Aillières
- Location of Aillières-Beauvoir
- Location within France Location within Pays de la Loire
- Coordinates: 48°24′18″N 0°19′32″E
- Country: France
- Region: Pays de la Loire
- Department: Sarthe
- Arrondissement: Mamers
- Canton: Mamers
- Intercommunality: Maine Saosnois

Government
  - Mayor (2020–2026): Nadine Ceconi
- Area^{1}: 15.06 km^{2} (5.81 sq mi)
- Highest elevation: 337 m (1,106 ft)
- Lowest elevation: 142 m (466 ft)
- Population (2023): 200
  - Density: 13/km^{2} (34/sq mi)
- Time zone: UTC+01:00 (CET)
  - Summer (DST): UTC+02:00 (CEST)
- INSEE/Postal code: 72002 /72600
- ^{1} French Land Register data, which excludes lakes, ponds, glaciers > 1 km^{2} (0.386 sq mi or 247 acres) and river estuaries.

Aillières-Beauvoir is a commune in the Sarthe department in the region of Pays de la Loire in north-western France. The commune was formed in 1965 by the merger of the former communes Aillières and Beauvoir.

== Population ==
Historical population
| Year | Pop. | ±% p.a. |
|---|---|---|
| 1968 | 291 | — |
| 1975 | 280 | −0.55% |
| 1982 | 237 | −2.35% |
| 1990 | 237 | +0.00% |
| 1999 | 237 | +0.00% |
| 2007 | 226 | −0.59% |
| 2012 | 211 | −1.36% |
| 2017 | 217 | +0.56% |
| 2023 | 200 | −1.35% |
Source: INSEE

== See also ==
- Communes of the Sarthe department
- Parc naturel régional Normandie-Maine
