= Villaines-la-Carelle =

- Commune
- Location of Villaines-la-Carelle
- Location within France Location within Pays de la Loire
- Coordinates: 48°22′38″N 0°17′59″E
- Country: France
- Region: Pays de la Loire
- Department: Sarthe
- Arrondissement: Mamers
- Canton: Mamers
- Intercommunality: Maine Saosnois

Government
  - Mayor (2020–2026): Serge Colin
- Area^{1}: 14.70 km^{2} (5.68 sq mi)
- Highest elevation: 341 m (1,119 ft)
- Lowest elevation: 128 m (420 ft)
- Population (2023): 132
  - Density: 8.98/km^{2} (23.3/sq mi)
- Demonym(s): Villainois, Villainoise
- Time zone: UTC+01:00 (CET)
  - Summer (DST): UTC+02:00 (CEST)
- INSEE/Postal code: 72374 /72600
- ^{1} French Land Register data, which excludes lakes, ponds, glaciers > 1 km^{2} (0.386 sq mi or 247 acres) and river estuaries.

Villaines-la-Carelle (French pronunciation: [vilɛn la kaʁɛl]) is a commune in the Sarthe department in the region of Pays de la Loire in north-western France.

== See also ==
- Communes of the Sarthe department
- Parc naturel régional Normandie-Maine
