= Saint-Cosme-en-Vairais =

- Commune
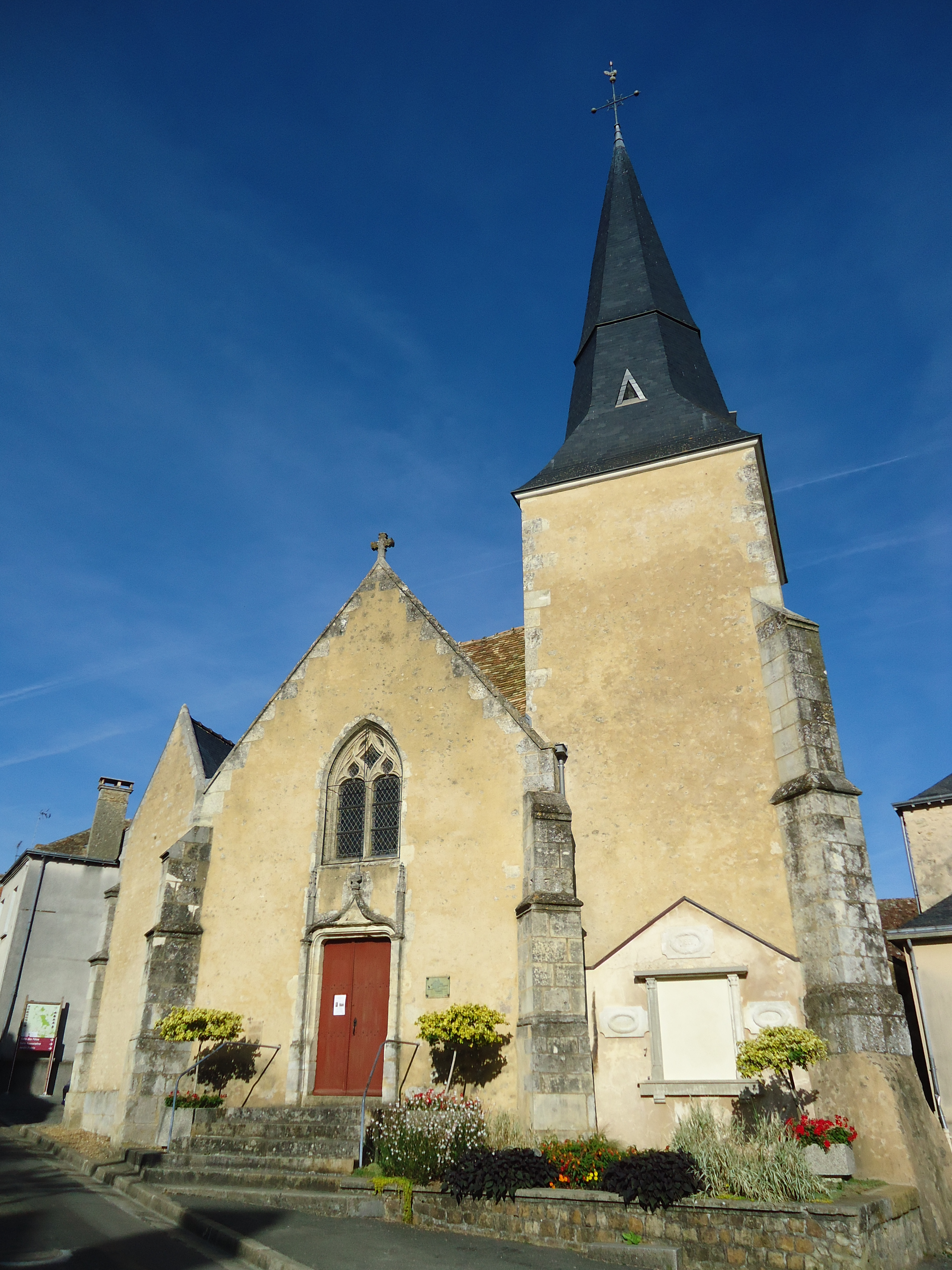
- The church of Saint-Augustin
- Location of Saint-Cosme-en-Vairais
- Location within France Location within Pays de la Loire
- Coordinates: 48°16′26″N 0°27′36″E
- Country: France
- Region: Pays de la Loire
- Department: Sarthe
- Arrondissement: Mamers
- Canton: Mamers
- Intercommunality: Maine Saosnois

Government
  - Mayor (2020–2026): Philippe Richard
- Area^{1}: 32.63 km^{2} (12.60 sq mi)
- Highest elevation: 180 m (590 ft)
- Lowest elevation: 67 m (220 ft)
- Population (2023): 1,927
  - Density: 59.06/km^{2} (153.0/sq mi)
- Time zone: UTC+01:00 (CET)
  - Summer (DST): UTC+02:00 (CEST)
- INSEE/Postal code: 72276 /72110
- ^{1} French Land Register data, which excludes lakes, ponds, glaciers > 1 km^{2} (0.386 sq mi or 247 acres) and river estuaries.

Saint-Cosme-en-Vairais (French pronunciation: [sɛ̃ kom ɑ̃ vɛʁɛ]) is a commune in the Sarthe department in the region of Pays de la Loire in north-western France.

== See also ==
- Communes of the Sarthe department
