= Congé-sur-Orne =

- Commune
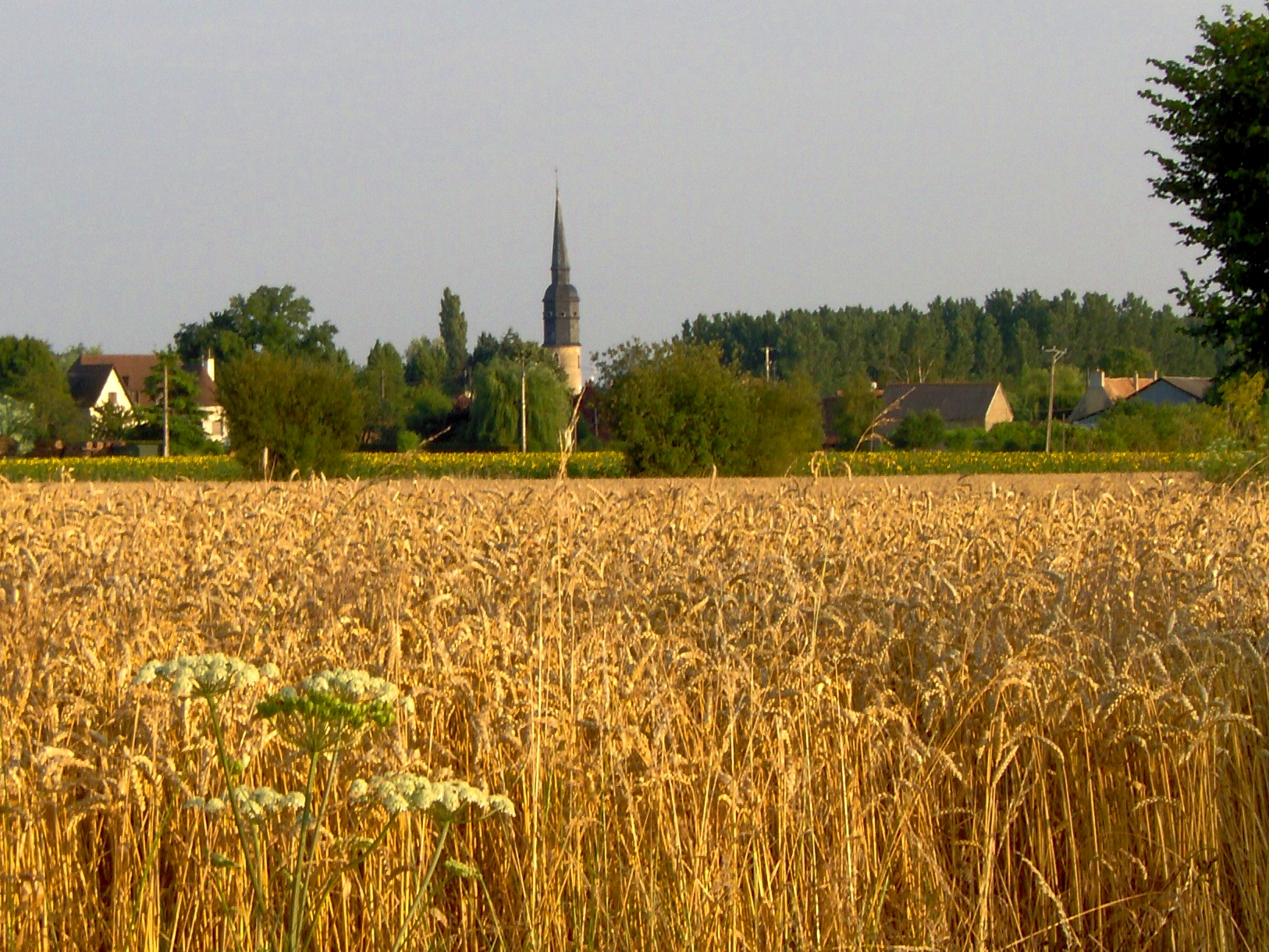
- View of the road to Dangeul
- Location of Congé-sur-Orne
- Location within France Location within Pays de la Loire
- Coordinates: 48°12′00″N 0°15′13″E
- Country: France
- Region: Pays de la Loire
- Department: Sarthe
- Arrondissement: Mamers
- Canton: Mamers
- Intercommunality: Maine Saosnois

Government
  - Mayor (2020–2026): Katia Ambrois
- Area^{1}: 11.2 km^{2} (4.3 sq mi)
- Highest elevation: 73 m (240 ft)
- Lowest elevation: 53 m (174 ft)
- Population (2023): 314
  - Density: 28.0/km^{2} (72.6/sq mi)
- Time zone: UTC+01:00 (CET)
  - Summer (DST): UTC+02:00 (CEST)
- INSEE/Postal code: 72088 /72290
- ^{1} French Land Register data, which excludes lakes, ponds, glaciers > 1 km^{2} (0.386 sq mi or 247 acres) and river estuaries.

Congé-sur-Orne is a commune in the Sarthe department in the Pays de la Loire region in north-western France.

Its inhabitants are called 'Congéennes' and 'Congéens'; most of its population resides in the village, locally called le bourg; the rest is disseminated in hamlets and in isolated farms.

== See also ==
- Communes of the Sarthe department

== Pictures ==
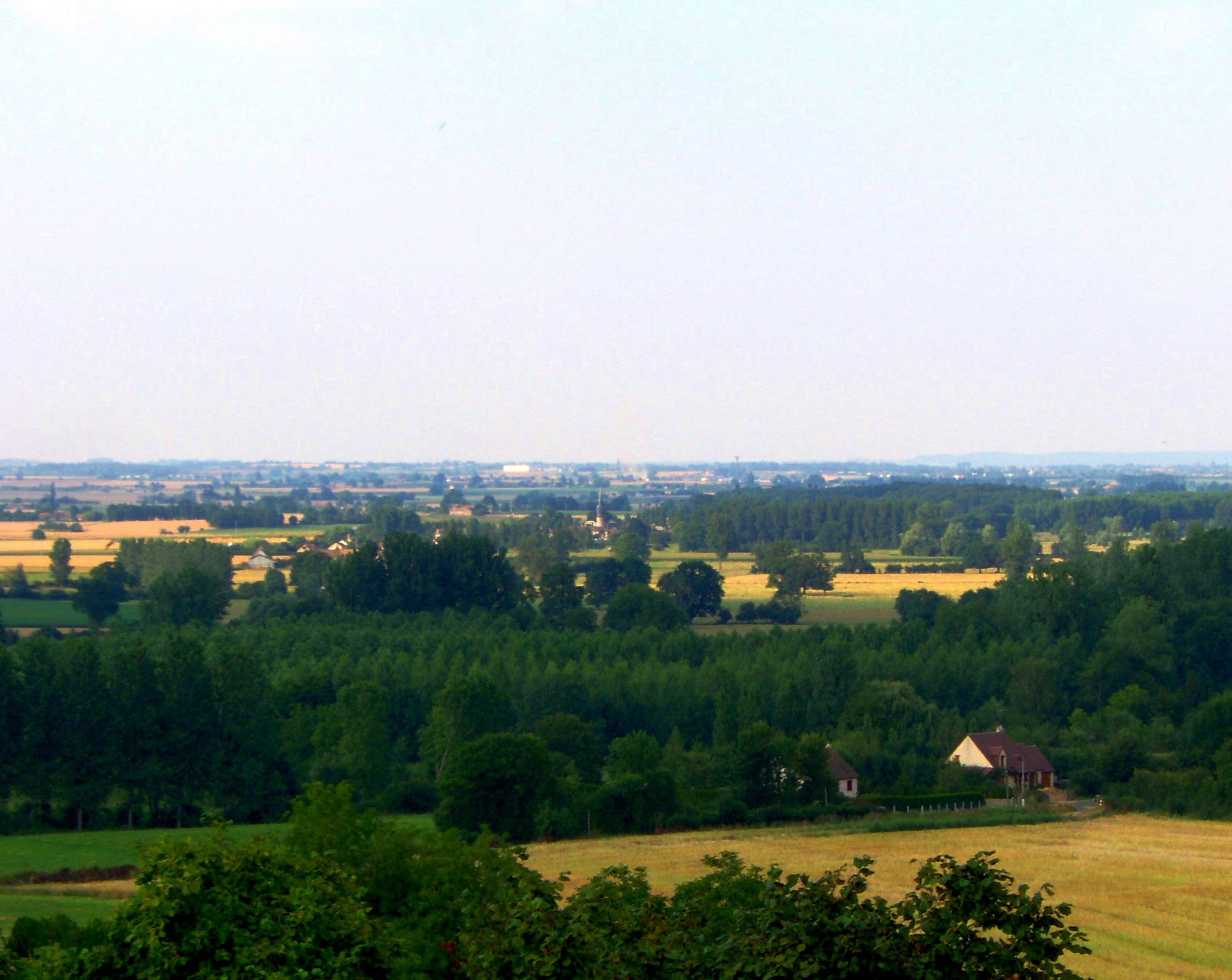
Congé-sur-Orne viewed from the hillsides of Ballon

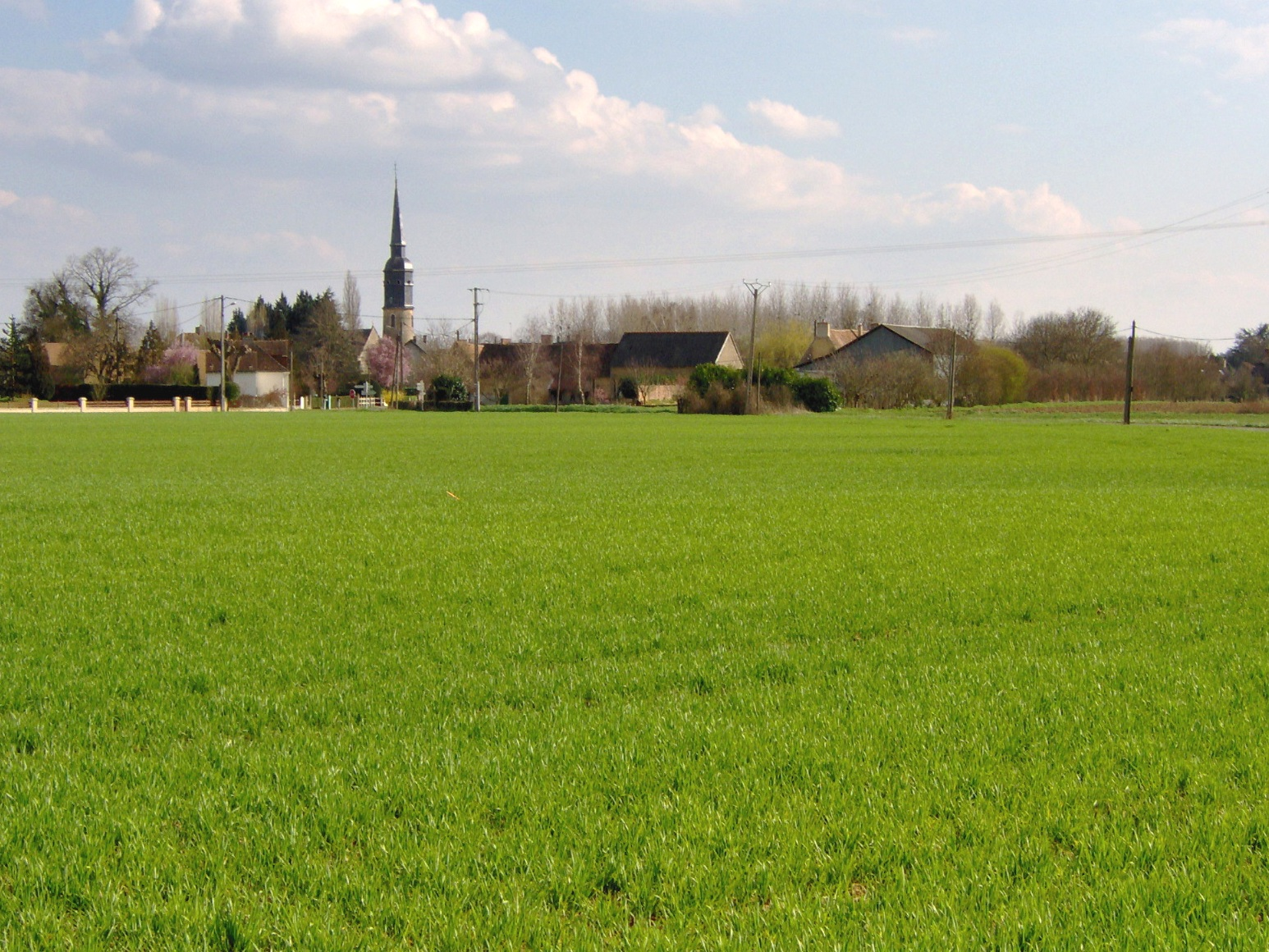
Congé-sur-Orne from the road of Dangeul

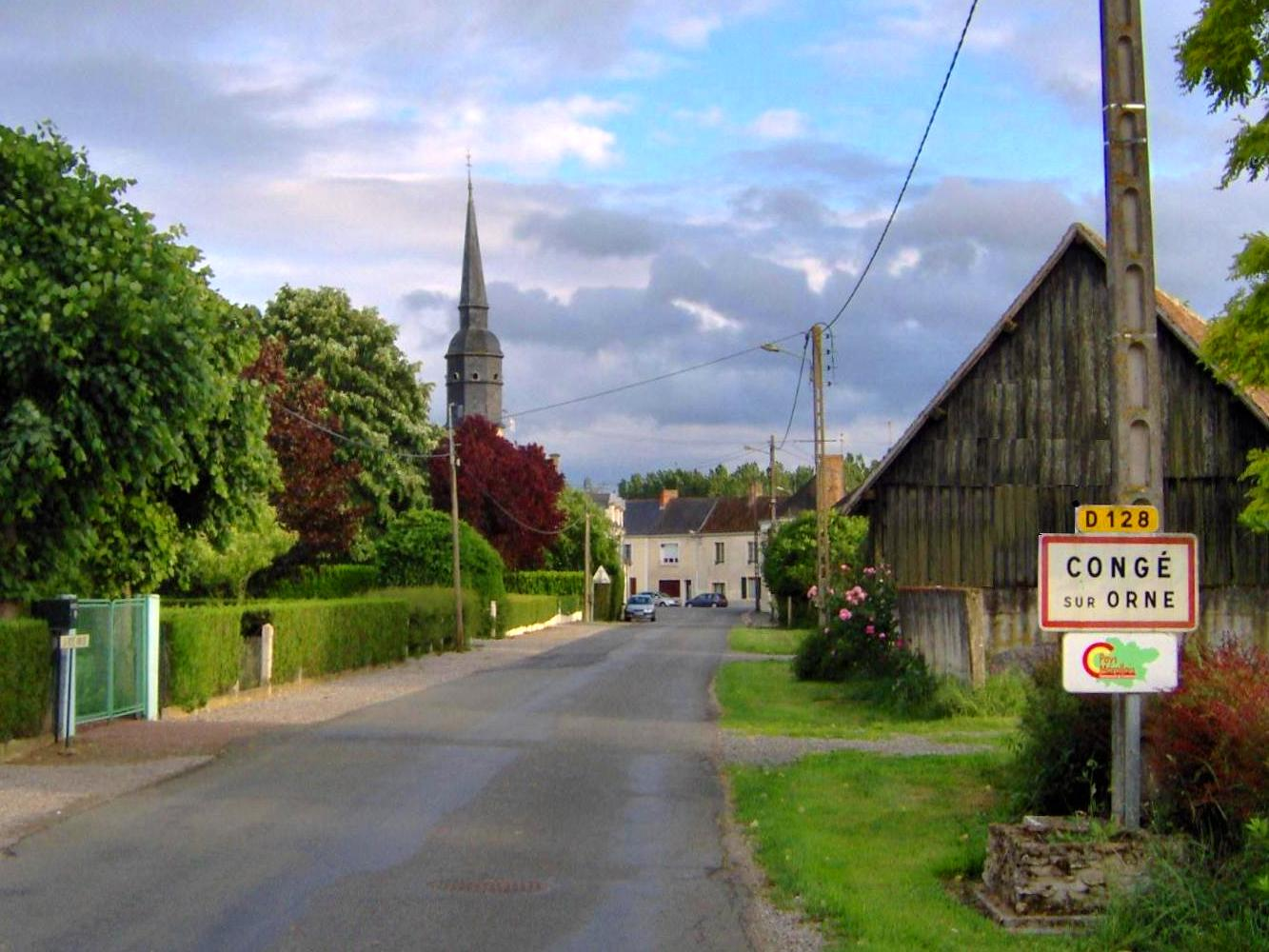
Entering the 'bourg.'

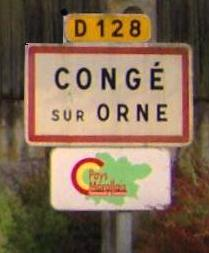

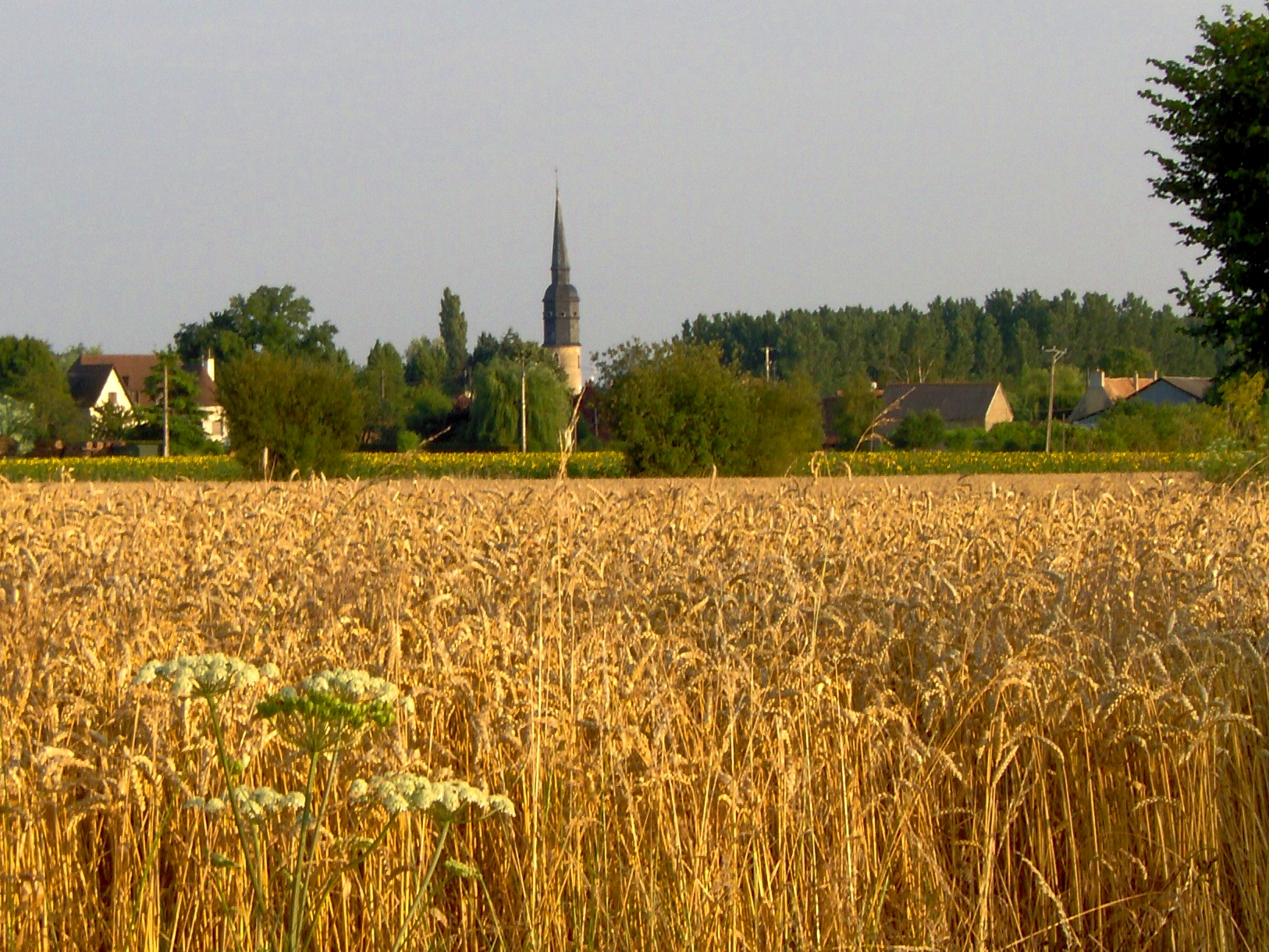
Congé-sur-Orne from the road of Dangeul

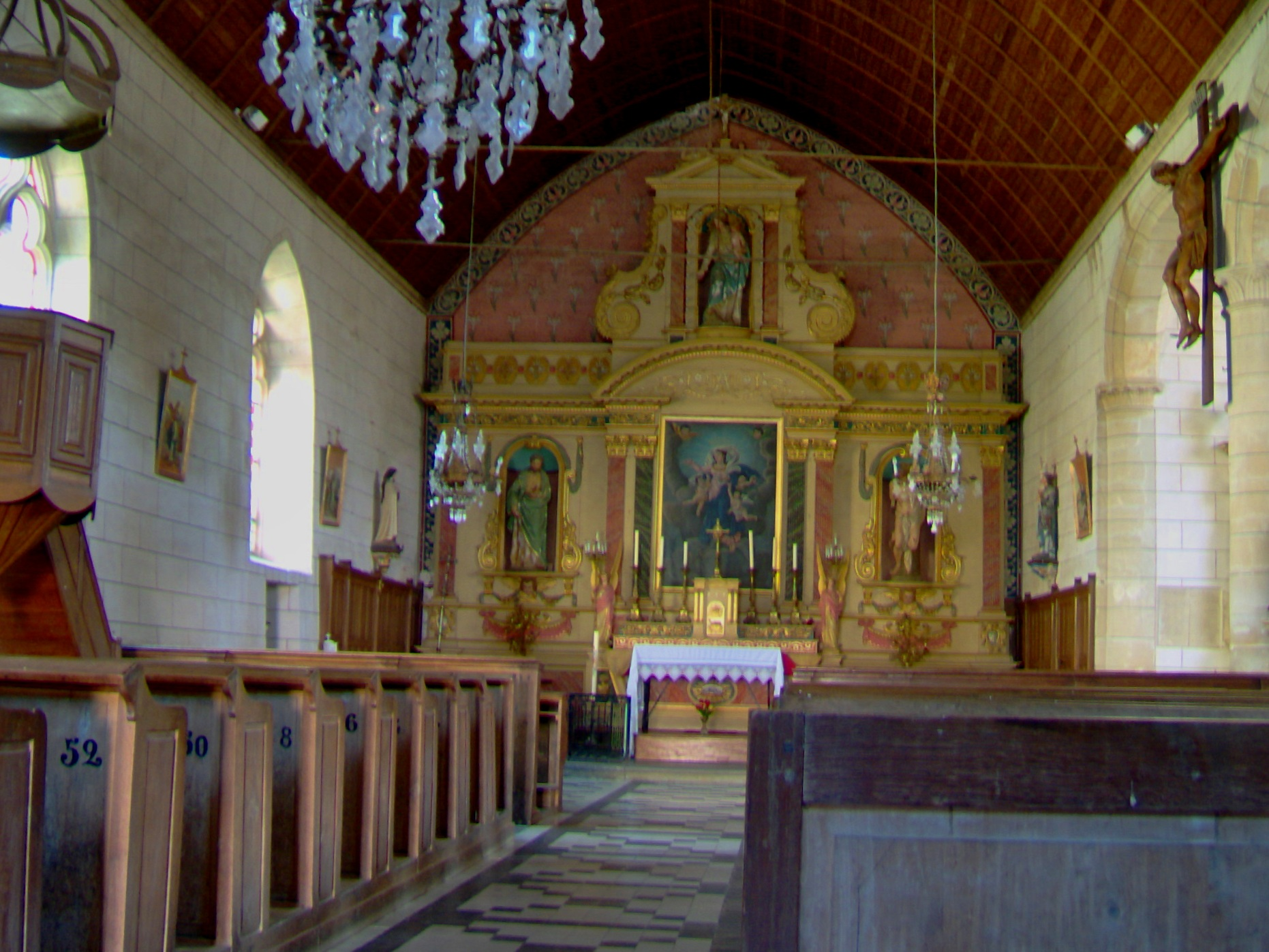
The church

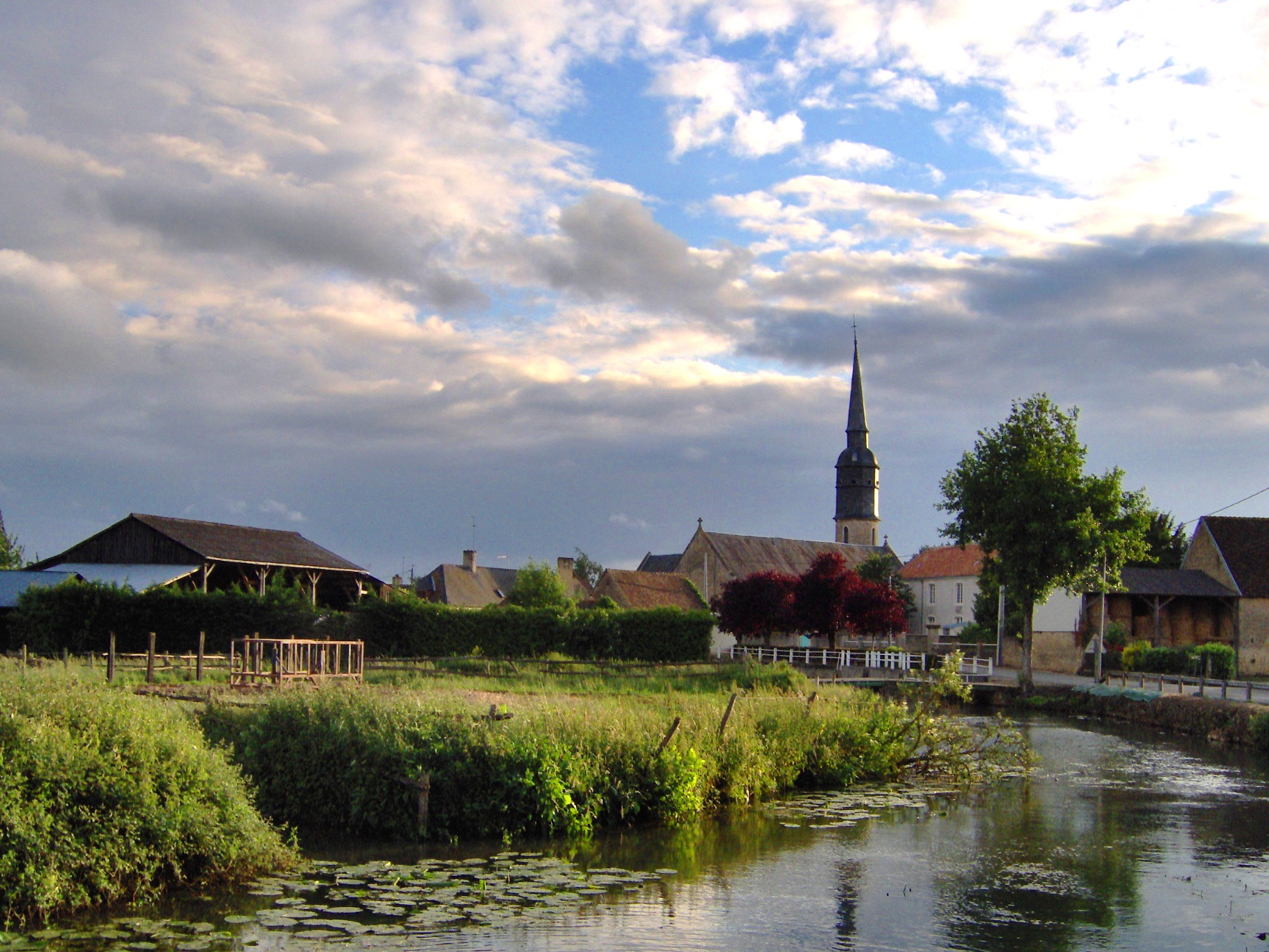
The Orne river
