= Saint-Pierre-des-Ormes =

- Commune
- Location of Saint-Pierre-des-Ormes
- Location within France Location within Pays de la Loire
- Coordinates: 48°18′23″N 0°25′17″E
- Country: France
- Region: Pays de la Loire
- Department: Sarthe
- Arrondissement: Mamers
- Canton: Mamers
- Intercommunality: Maine Saosnois

Government
  - Mayor (2020–2026): Michel Ched'Homme
- Area^{1}: 10.12 km^{2} (3.91 sq mi)
- Highest elevation: 104 m (341 ft)
- Lowest elevation: 68 m (223 ft)
- Population (2023): 206
  - Density: 20.4/km^{2} (52.7/sq mi)
- Demonym(s): Pétriormois, Pétriormoise
- Time zone: UTC+01:00 (CET)
  - Summer (DST): UTC+02:00 (CEST)
- INSEE/Postal code: 72313 /72600
- ^{1} French Land Register data, which excludes lakes, ponds, glaciers > 1 km^{2} (0.386 sq mi or 247 acres) and river estuaries.

Saint-Pierre-des-Ormes (French pronunciation: [sɛ̃ pjɛʁ de.z‿ɔʁm]) is a commune in the Sarthe department in the region of Pays de la Loire in north-western France.

== See also ==
- Communes of the Sarthe department
