= Les Aulneaux =

- Commune
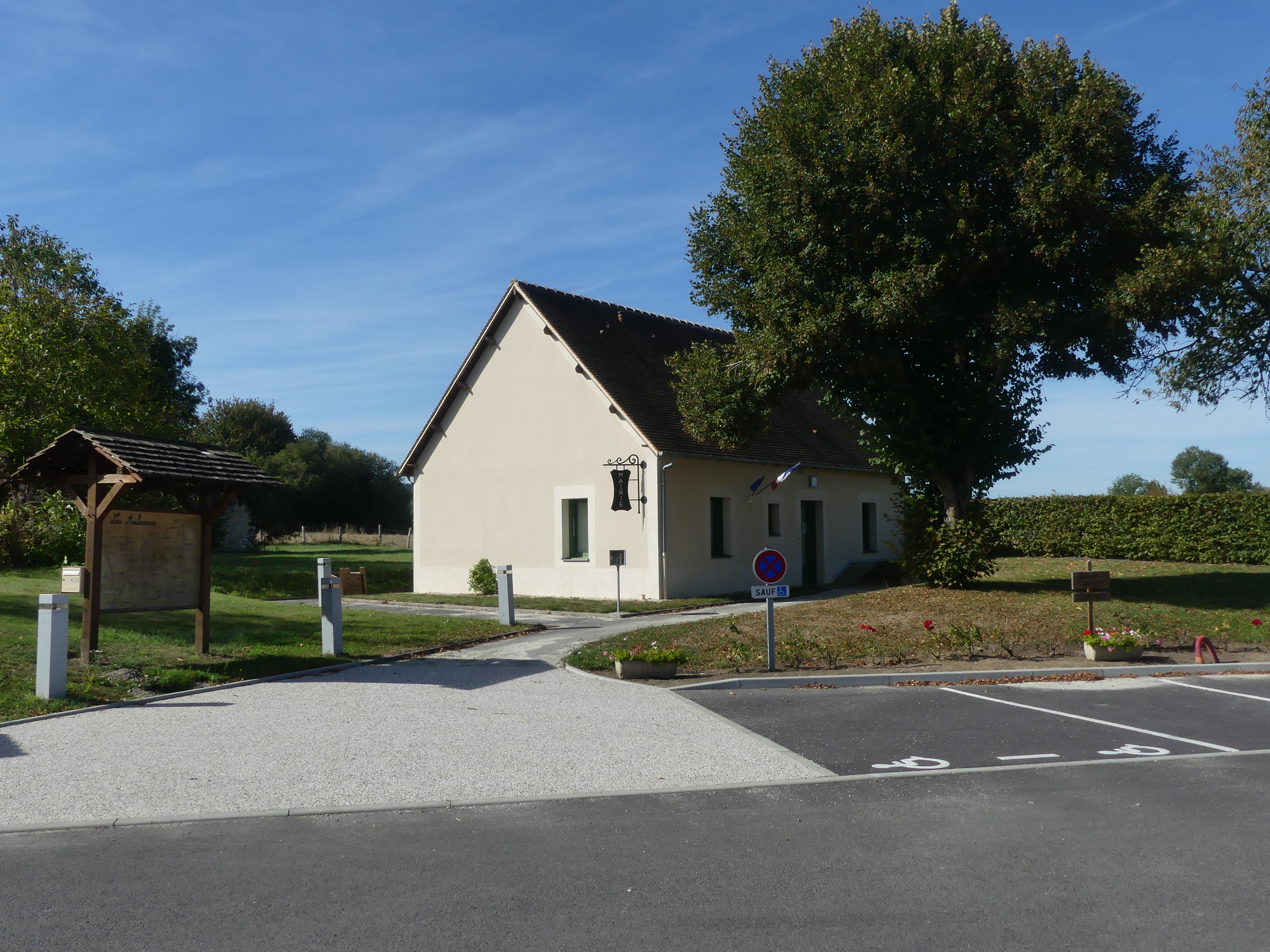
- Les Aulneaux Town hall
- Location of Les Aulneaux
- Location within France Location within Pays de la Loire
- Coordinates: 48°26′12″N 0°19′57″E
- Country: France
- Region: Pays de la Loire
- Department: Sarthe
- Arrondissement: Mamers
- Canton: Mamers
- Intercommunality: Maine Saosnois

Government
  - Mayor (2020–2026): Claudine Pénisson
- Area^{1}: 8.17 km^{2} (3.15 sq mi)
- Highest elevation: 190 m (620 ft)
- Lowest elevation: 143 m (469 ft)
- Population (2023): 111
  - Density: 13.6/km^{2} (35.2/sq mi)
- Time zone: UTC+01:00 (CET)
  - Summer (DST): UTC+02:00 (CEST)
- INSEE/Postal code: 72015 /72670
- ^{1} French Land Register data, which excludes lakes, ponds, glaciers > 1 km^{2} (0.386 sq mi or 247 acres) and river estuaries.

Les Aulneaux is a commune in the Sarthe department in the region of Pays de la Loire in north-western France.

== See also ==
- Communes of the Sarthe department
