= Saint-Vincent-des-Prés, Sarthe =

Saint-Vincent-des-Prés
- Commune
- Location of Saint-Vincent-des-Prés
- Location within France Location within Pays de la Loire
- Coordinates: 48°17′44″N 0°23′09″E
- Country: France
- Region: Pays de la Loire
- Department: Sarthe
- Arrondissement: Mamers
- Canton: Mamers
- Intercommunality: Maine Saosnois

Government
  - Mayor (2020–2026): Patrick Gosnet
- Area^{1}: 10.51 km^{2} (4.06 sq mi)
- Highest elevation: 118 m (387 ft)
- Lowest elevation: 69 m (226 ft)
- Population (2023): 502
  - Density: 47.8/km^{2} (124/sq mi)
- Demonym(s): Viventien, Viventienne
- Time zone: UTC+01:00 (CET)
  - Summer (DST): UTC+02:00 (CEST)
- INSEE/Postal code: 72324 /72600
- ^{1} French Land Register data, which excludes lakes, ponds, glaciers > 1 km^{2} (0.386 sq mi or 247 acres) and river estuaries.

Saint-Vincent-des-Prés (French pronunciation: [sɛ̃ vɛ̃sɑ̃ de pʁe]) is a commune in the Sarthe department in the region of Pays de la Loire in north-western France.

== See also ==
- Communes of the Sarthe department
