= Saint-Rémy-des-Monts =

- Commune
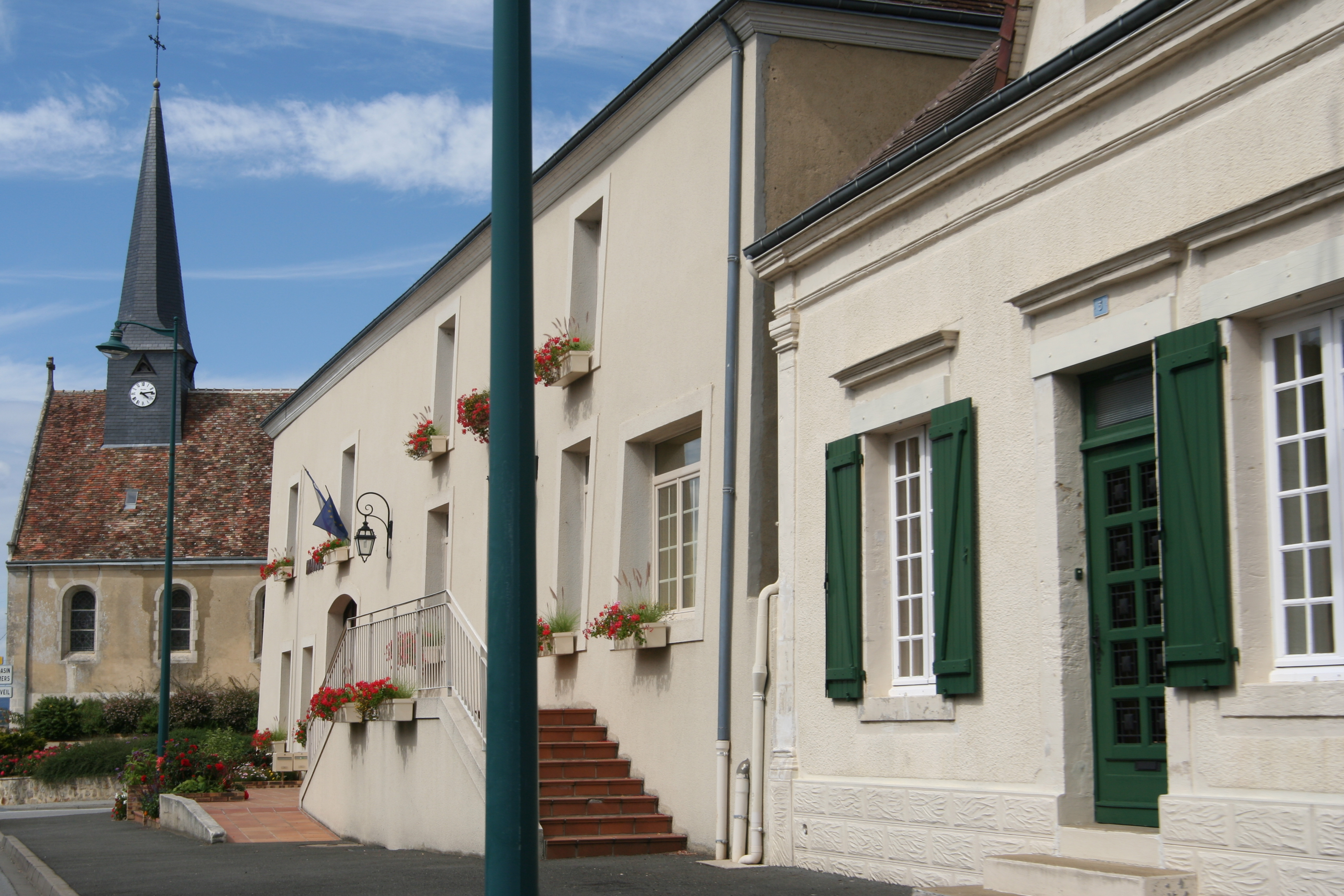
- The town hall of Saint-Rémy-des-Monts
- Location of Saint-Rémy-des-Monts
- Location within France Location within Pays de la Loire
- Coordinates: 48°18′31″N 0°24′02″E
- Country: France
- Region: Pays de la Loire
- Department: Sarthe
- Arrondissement: Mamers
- Canton: Mamers
- Intercommunality: Maine Saosnois

Government
  - Mayor (2020–2026): Philippe Chartier
- Area^{1}: 10.12 km^{2} (3.91 sq mi)
- Highest elevation: 145 m (476 ft)
- Lowest elevation: 80 m (260 ft)
- Population (2023): 713
  - Density: 70.5/km^{2} (182/sq mi)
- Demonym(s): Rémy-Montais, Rémy-Montaise
- Time zone: UTC+01:00 (CET)
  - Summer (DST): UTC+02:00 (CEST)
- INSEE/Postal code: 72316 /72600
- ^{1} French Land Register data, which excludes lakes, ponds, glaciers > 1 km^{2} (0.386 sq mi or 247 acres) and river estuaries.

Saint-Rémy-des-Monts (French pronunciation: [sɛ̃ ʁemi de mɔ̃]) is a commune in the Sarthe department in the region of Pays de la Loire in north-western France.

== See also ==
- Communes of the Sarthe department
