= Commerveil =

- Commune
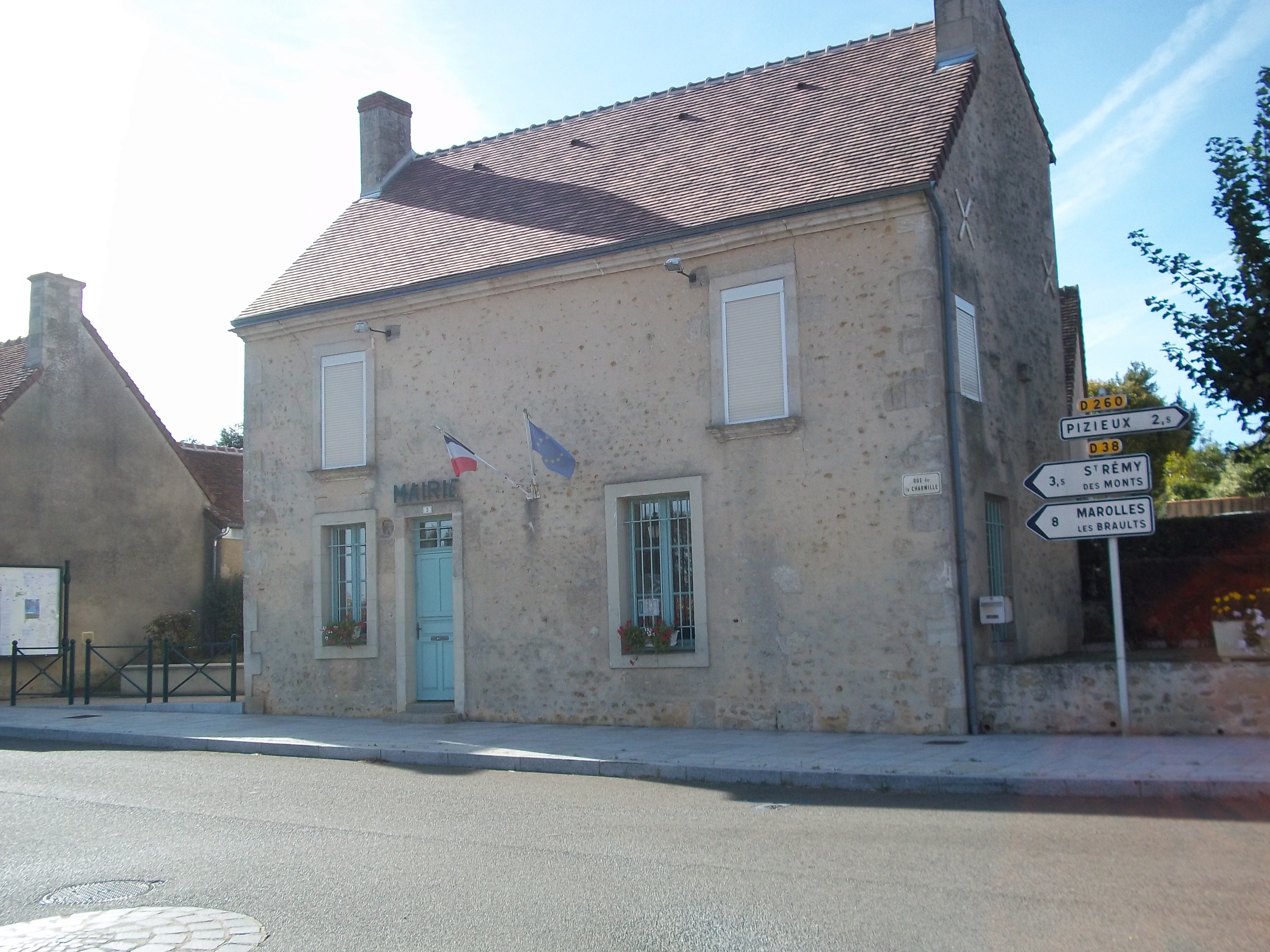
- Commerveil Town hall
- Location of Commerveil
- Location within France Location within Pays de la Loire
- Coordinates: 48°19′01″N 0°21′28″E
- Country: France
- Region: Pays de la Loire
- Department: Sarthe
- Arrondissement: Mamers
- Canton: Mamers
- Intercommunality: Maine Saosnois

Government
  - Mayor (2020–2026): Christian Chedhomme
- Area^{1}: 5.64 km^{2} (2.18 sq mi)
- Highest elevation: 143 m (469 ft)
- Lowest elevation: 79 m (259 ft)
- Population (2023): 138
  - Density: 24.5/km^{2} (63.4/sq mi)
- Demonym(s): Commerveillais, Commerveillaise
- Time zone: UTC+01:00 (CET)
  - Summer (DST): UTC+02:00 (CEST)
- INSEE/Postal code: 72086 /72600
- ^{1} French Land Register data, which excludes lakes, ponds, glaciers > 1 km^{2} (0.386 sq mi or 247 acres) and river estuaries.

Commerveil (French pronunciation: [kɔmɛʁvɛj]) is a commune in the Sarthe department in the Pays de la Loire region in north-western France.

== See also ==
- Communes of the Sarthe department
