= Vezot =

- Commune
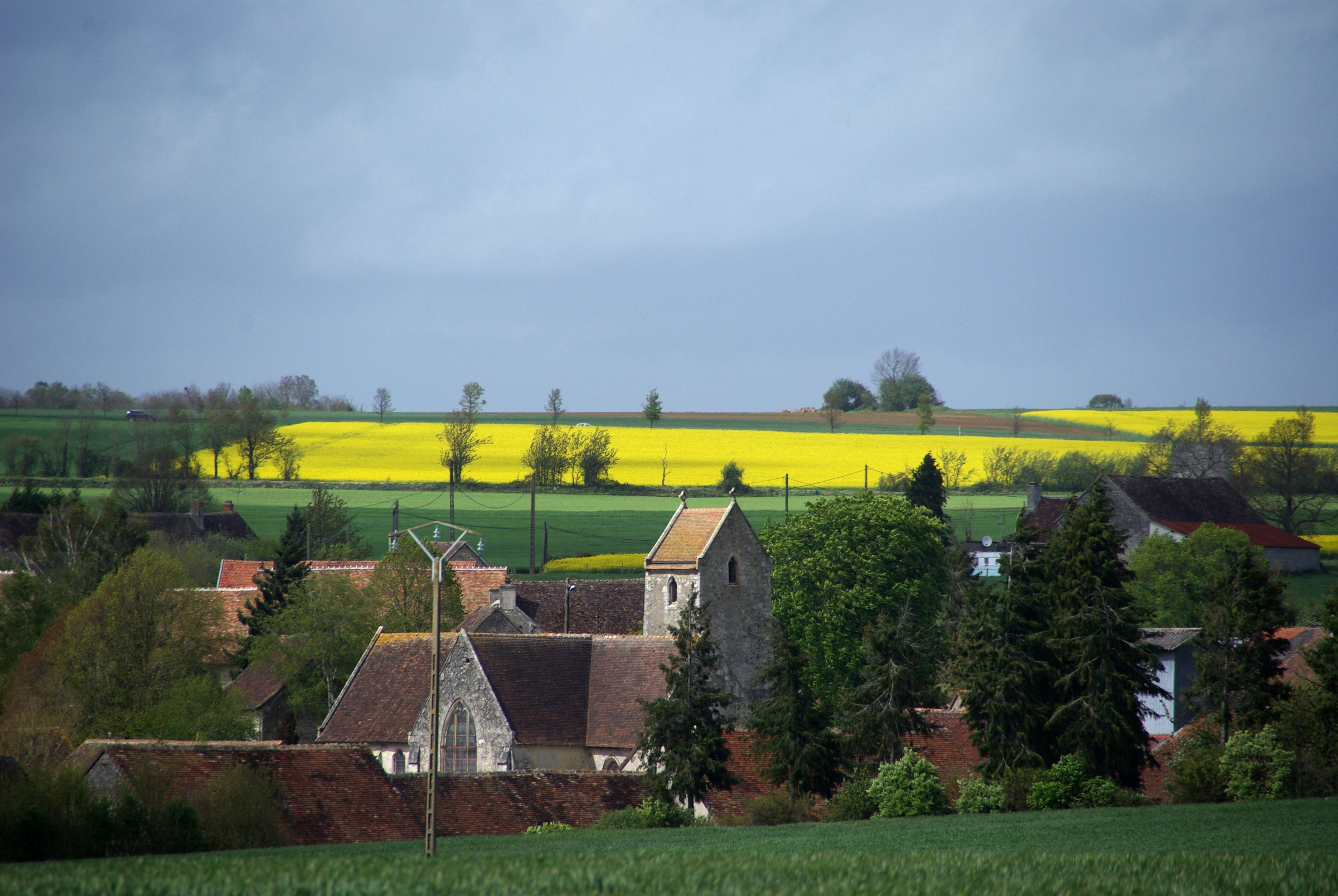
- A general view of Vezot
- Location of Vezot
- Location within France Location within Pays de la Loire
- Coordinates: 48°21′13″N 0°17′31″E
- Country: France
- Region: Pays de la Loire
- Department: Sarthe
- Arrondissement: Mamers
- Canton: Mamers
- Intercommunality: Maine Saosnois

Government
  - Mayor (2020–2026): Didier Cornueil
- Area^{1}: 6.3 km^{2} (2.4 sq mi)
- Highest elevation: 214 m (702 ft)
- Lowest elevation: 124 m (407 ft)
- Population (2023): 75
  - Density: 12/km^{2} (31/sq mi)
- Demonym(s): Vezotin, Vezotine
- Time zone: UTC+01:00 (CET)
  - Summer (DST): UTC+02:00 (CEST)
- INSEE/Postal code: 72372 /72600
- ^{1} French Land Register data, which excludes lakes, ponds, glaciers > 1 km^{2} (0.386 sq mi or 247 acres) and river estuaries.

Vezot (French pronunciation: [vəzo]) is a commune in the Sarthe department in the region of Pays de la Loire in north-western France.

== See also ==
- Communes of the Sarthe department
