= Monhoudou =

- Commune
- Coat of arms
- Location of Monhoudou
- Location within France Location within Pays de la Loire
- Coordinates: 48°17′14″N 0°19′40″E
- Country: France
- Region: Pays de la Loire
- Department: Sarthe
- Arrondissement: Mamers
- Canton: Mamers
- Intercommunality: Maine Saosnois

Government
  - Mayor (2020–2026): Luc Morin
- Area^{1}: 7.52 km^{2} (2.90 sq mi)
- Highest elevation: 138 m (453 ft)
- Lowest elevation: 79 m (259 ft)
- Population (2023): 214
  - Density: 28.5/km^{2} (73.7/sq mi)
- Demonym(s): Monthélodien, Monthélodienne
- Time zone: UTC+01:00 (CET)
  - Summer (DST): UTC+02:00 (CEST)
- INSEE/Postal code: 72202 /72260
- ^{1} French Land Register data, which excludes lakes, ponds, glaciers > 1 km^{2} (0.386 sq mi or 247 acres) and river estuaries.

Monhoudou is a commune in the Sarthe department in the region of Pays de la Loire in north-western France.

== See also ==
- Communes of the Sarthe department
