= Meurcé =

- Commune
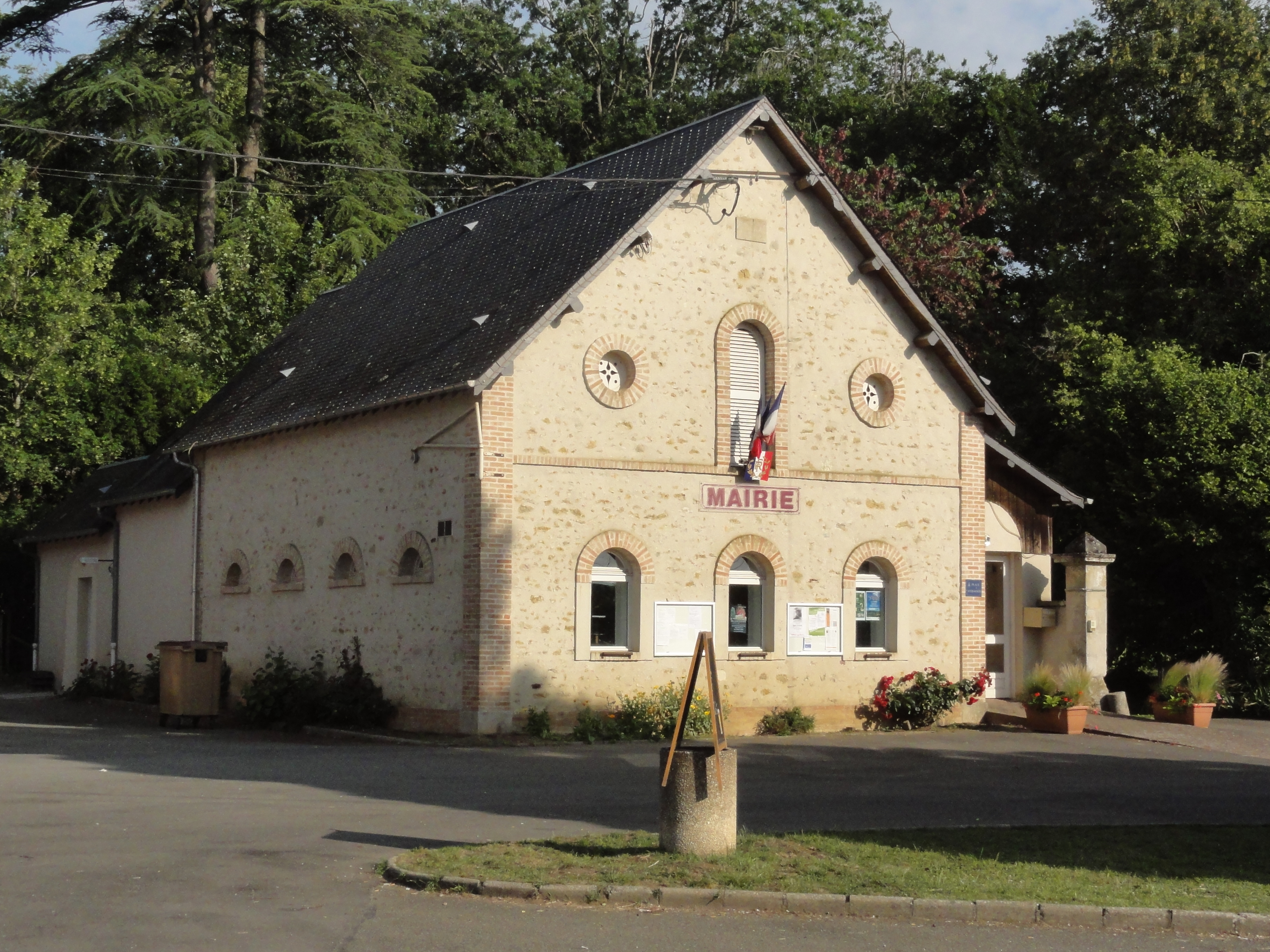
- Meurçe Town hall
- Location of Meurcé
- Location within France Location within Pays de la Loire
- Coordinates: 48°14′04″N 0°12′08″E
- Country: France
- Region: Pays de la Loire
- Department: Sarthe
- Arrondissement: Mamers
- Canton: Mamers

Government
  - Mayor (2020–2026): Michel Chabrerie
- Area^{1}: 6.16 km^{2} (2.38 sq mi)
- Highest elevation: 82 m (269 ft)
- Lowest elevation: 59 m (194 ft)
- Population (2023): 275
  - Density: 44.6/km^{2} (116/sq mi)
- Demonym(s): Meurcéen, Meurcéenne
- Time zone: UTC+01:00 (CET)
  - Summer (DST): UTC+02:00 (CEST)
- INSEE/Postal code: 72194 /72170
- ^{1} French Land Register data, which excludes lakes, ponds, glaciers > 1 km^{2} (0.386 sq mi or 247 acres) and river estuaries.

Meurcé (French pronunciation: [mœʁse]) is a commune in the Sarthe department in the region of Pays de la Loire in north-western France.

== See also ==
- Communes of the Sarthe department
