= Dangeul =

- Commune
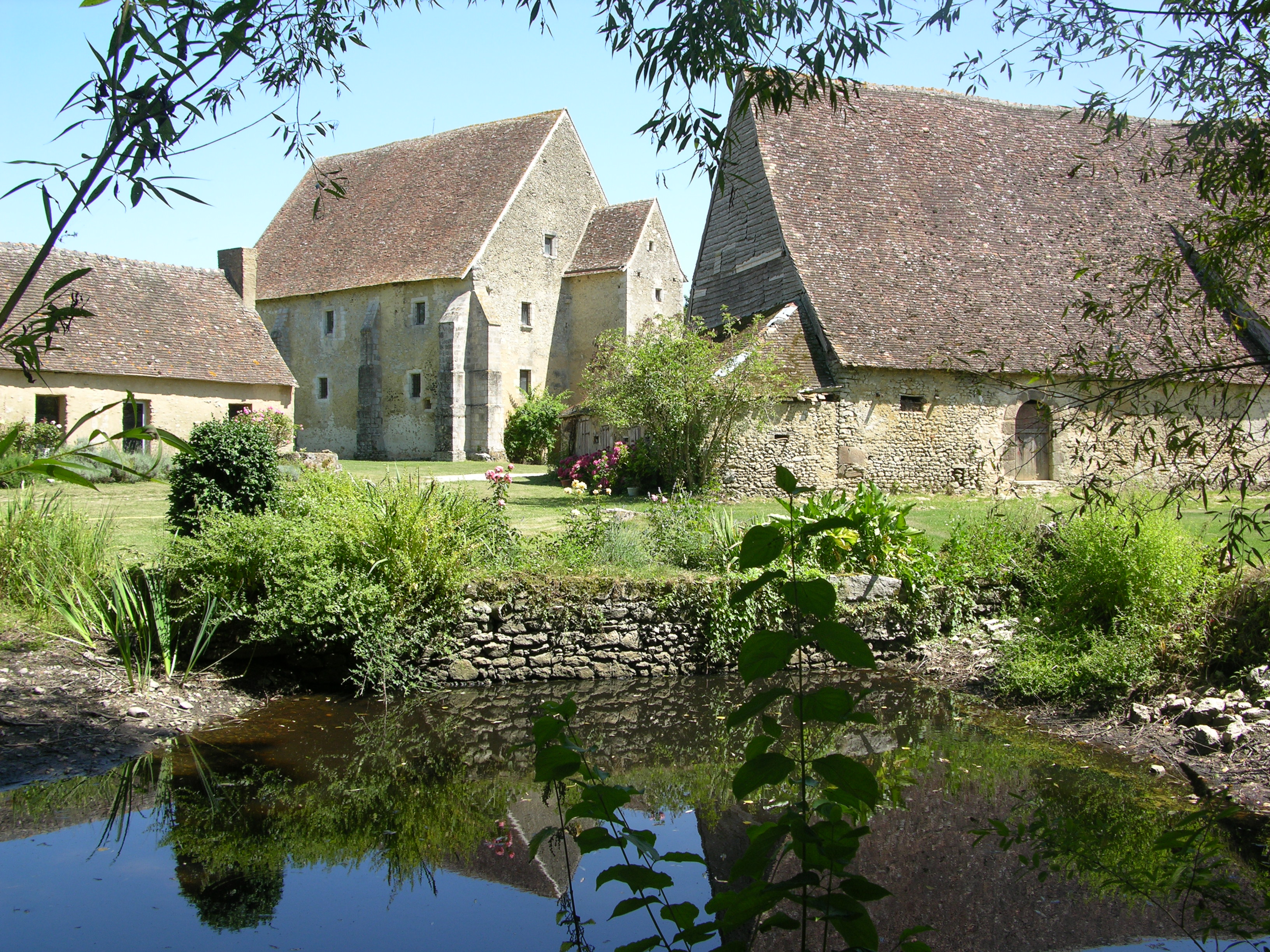
- The priory of Mayanne

- Coat of arms
- Location of Dangeul
- Location within France Location within Pays de la Loire
- Coordinates: 48°14′52″N 0°15′34″E
- Country: France
- Region: Pays de la Loire
- Department: Sarthe
- Arrondissement: Mamers
- Canton: Mamers
- Intercommunality: Maine Saosnois

Government
  - Mayor (2020–2026): Philippe Nicolas
- Area^{1}: 13.64 km^{2} (5.27 sq mi)
- Highest elevation: 104 m (341 ft)
- Lowest elevation: 62 m (203 ft)
- Population (2023): 486
  - Density: 35.6/km^{2} (92.3/sq mi)
- Demonym(s): Dangeulois, Dangeuloise
- Time zone: UTC+01:00 (CET)
  - Summer (DST): UTC+02:00 (CEST)
- INSEE/Postal code: 72112 /72260
- ^{1} French Land Register data, which excludes lakes, ponds, glaciers > 1 km^{2} (0.386 sq mi or 247 acres) and river estuaries.

Dangeul (French pronunciation: [dɑ̃ʒœl]) is a commune in the Sarthe department in the Pays de la Loire region in north-western France.

== See also ==
- Communes of the Sarthe department
