= Saosnes =

- Commune
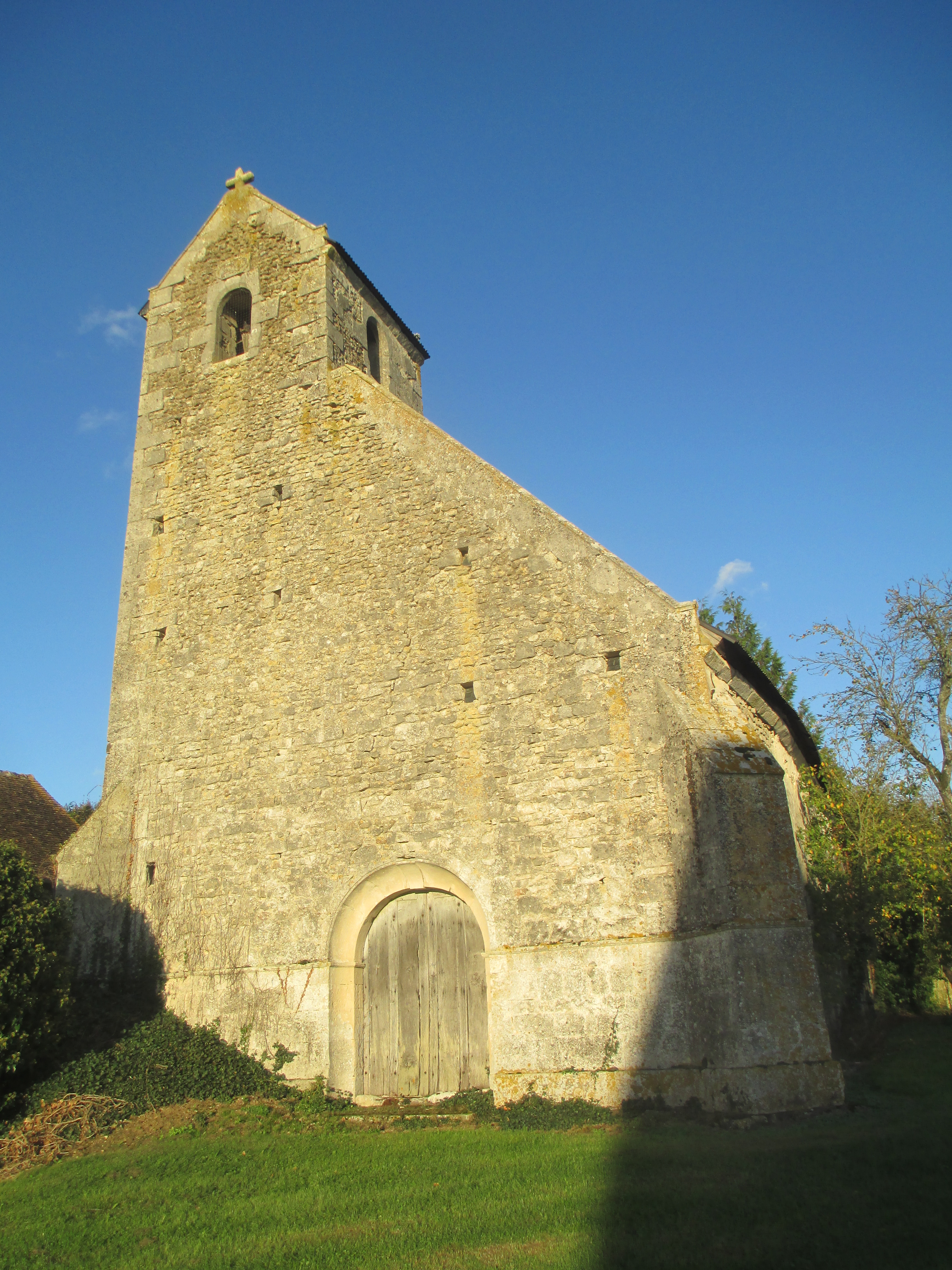
- The church of Saint-Julien of Montrenault
- Location of Saosnes
- Location within France Location within Pays de la Loire
- Coordinates: 48°19′35″N 0°16′44″E
- Country: France
- Region: Pays de la Loire
- Department: Sarthe
- Arrondissement: Mamers
- Canton: Mamers
- Intercommunality: Maine Saosnois

Government
  - Mayor (2020–2026): Roger Poisson
- Area^{1}: 11.24 km^{2} (4.34 sq mi)
- Highest elevation: 171 m (561 ft)
- Lowest elevation: 104 m (341 ft)
- Population (2023): 216
  - Density: 19.2/km^{2} (49.8/sq mi)
- Demonym(s): Saugonatien, Saugonatienne
- Time zone: UTC+01:00 (CET)
  - Summer (DST): UTC+02:00 (CEST)
- INSEE/Postal code: 72326 /72600
- ^{1} French Land Register data, which excludes lakes, ponds, glaciers > 1 km^{2} (0.386 sq mi or 247 acres) and river estuaries.

Saosnes (French pronunciation: [son]) is a commune in the Sarthe department in the region of Pays de la Loire in north-western France.

== See also ==
- Communes of the Sarthe department
