= Thoigné =

- Commune
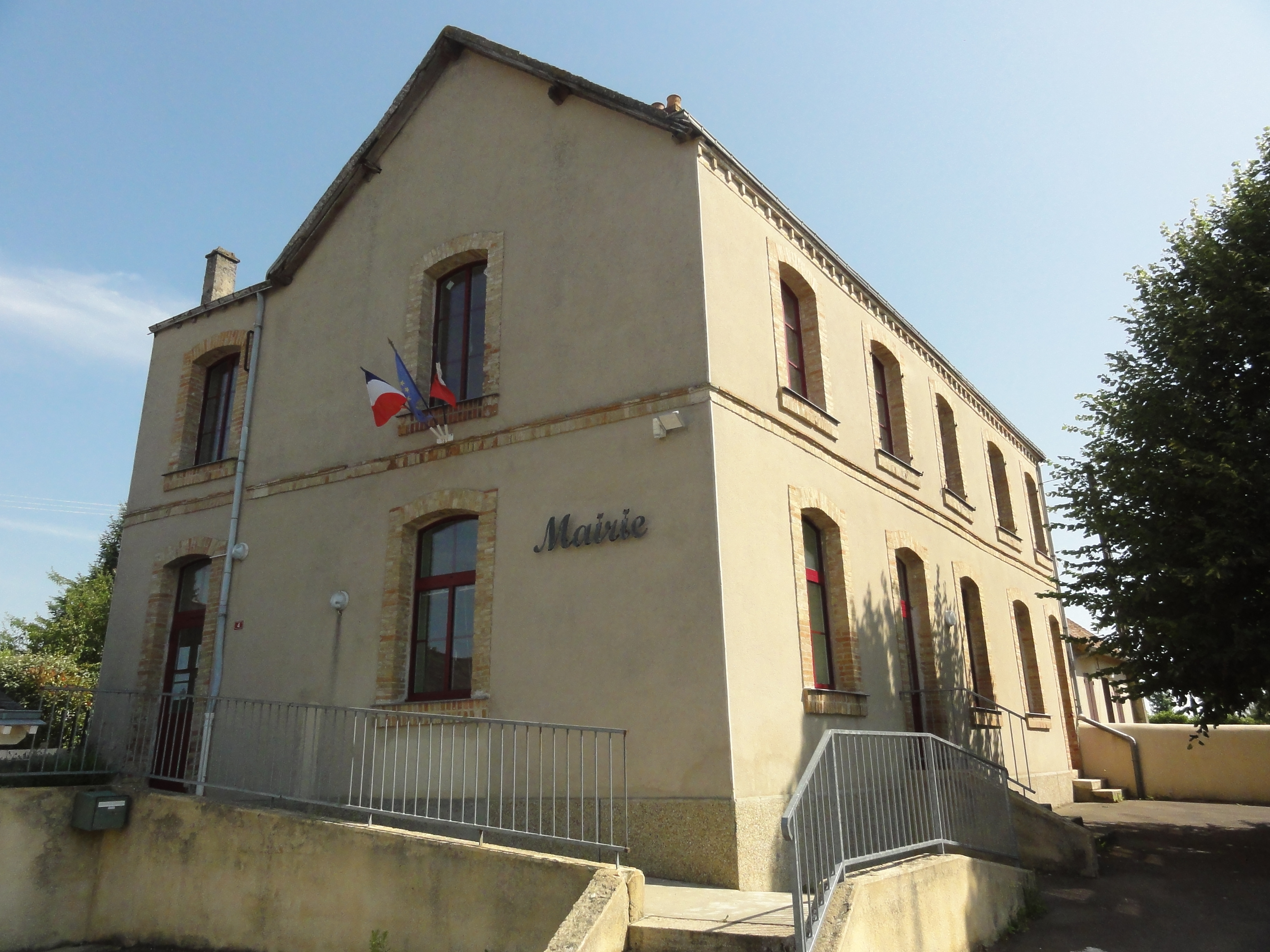
- Thoigné Town hall
- Location of Thoigné
- Location within France Location within Pays de la Loire
- Coordinates: 48°17′20″N 0°15′11″E
- Country: France
- Region: Pays de la Loire
- Department: Sarthe
- Arrondissement: Mamers
- Canton: Mamers
- Intercommunality: Maine Saosnois

Government
  - Mayor (2020–2026): Dominique Vovard
- Area^{1}: 7.31 km^{2} (2.82 sq mi)
- Highest elevation: 143 m (469 ft)
- Lowest elevation: 71 m (233 ft)
- Population (2023): 165
  - Density: 22.6/km^{2} (58.5/sq mi)
- Demonym(s): Thoignéen, Thoignéenne
- Time zone: UTC+01:00 (CET)
  - Summer (DST): UTC+02:00 (CEST)
- INSEE/Postal code: 72354 /72260
- ^{1} French Land Register data, which excludes lakes, ponds, glaciers > 1 km^{2} (0.386 sq mi or 247 acres) and river estuaries.

Thoigné (French pronunciation: [twaɲe]) is a commune in the Sarthe department in the region of Pays de la Loire in north-western France.

== See also ==
- Communes of the Sarthe department
