= Courgains =

- Commune
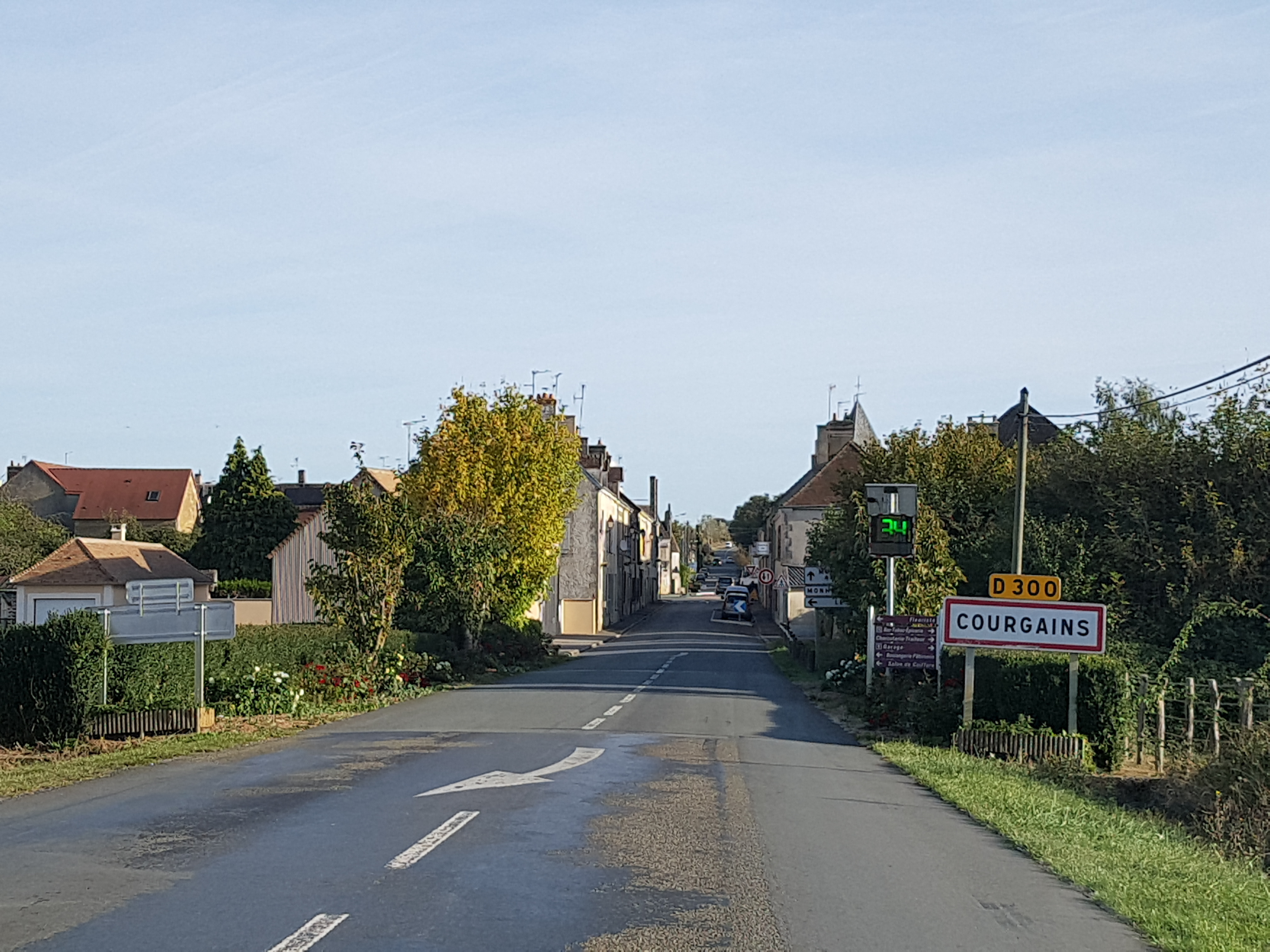
- Southern entrance of the town.
- Location of Courgains
- Location within France Location within Pays de la Loire
- Coordinates: 48°17′00″N 0°17′00″E
- Country: France
- Region: Pays de la Loire
- Department: Sarthe
- Arrondissement: Mamers
- Canton: Mamers
- Intercommunality: Maine Saosnois

Government
  - Mayor (2020–2026): Patrick Manuel
- Area^{1}: 14.29 km^{2} (5.52 sq mi)
- Highest elevation: 159 m (522 ft)
- Lowest elevation: 70 m (230 ft)
- Population (2023): 581
  - Density: 40.7/km^{2} (105/sq mi)
- Demonym(s): Courgannais, Courgannaise
- Time zone: UTC+01:00 (CET)
  - Summer (DST): UTC+02:00 (CEST)
- INSEE/Postal code: 72104 /72260
- ^{1} French Land Register data, which excludes lakes, ponds, glaciers > 1 km^{2} (0.386 sq mi or 247 acres) and river estuaries.

Courgains (French pronunciation: [kuʁɡɛ̃]) is a commune in the Sarthe department in the Pays de la Loire region in north-western France.

== See also ==
- Communes of the Sarthe department
