= René, Sarthe =

René
- Commune
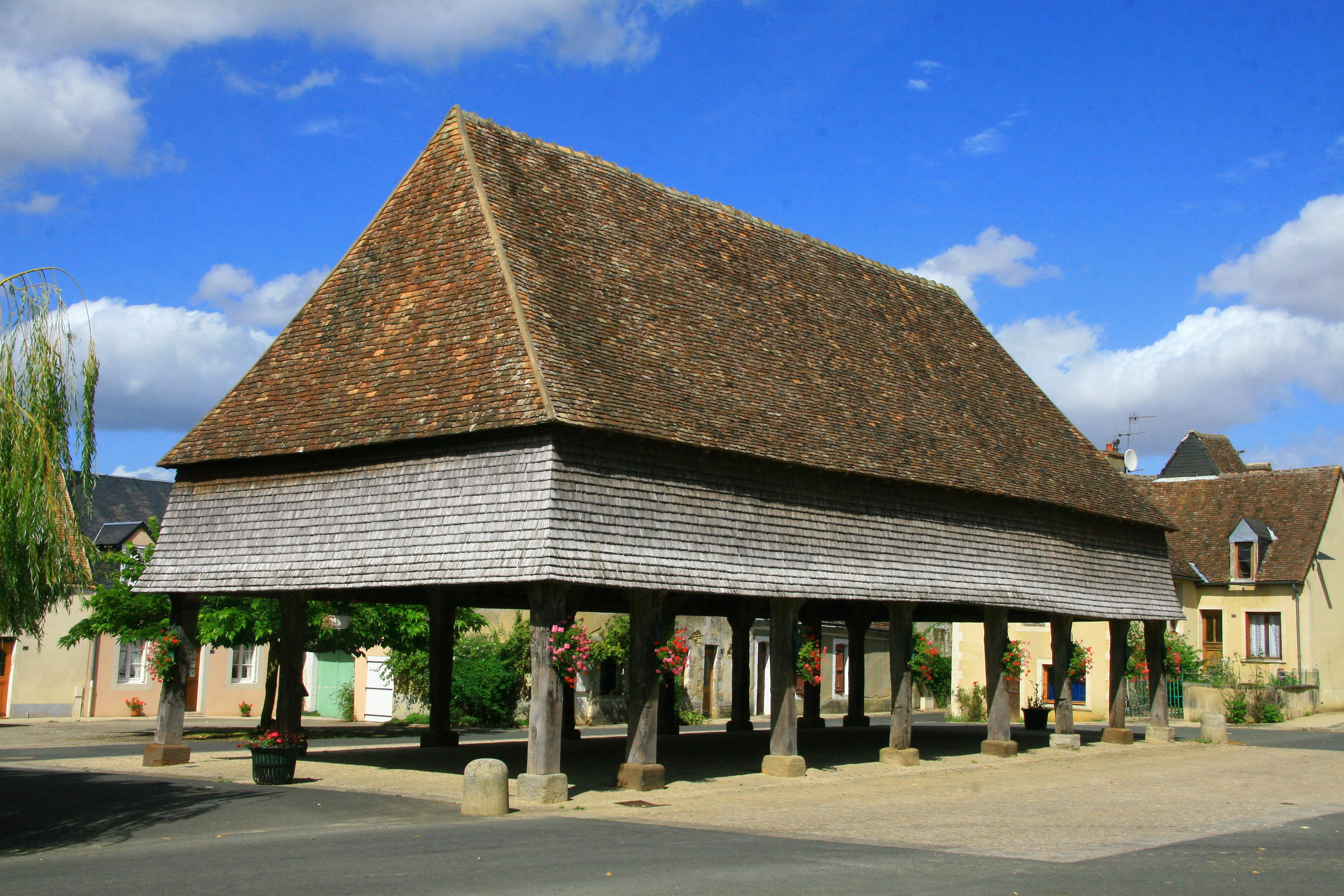
- The covered marketplace of René
- Location of René
- Location within France Location within Pays de la Loire
- Coordinates: 48°16′44″N 0°13′16″E
- Country: France
- Region: Pays de la Loire
- Department: Sarthe
- Arrondissement: Mamers
- Canton: Mamers
- Intercommunality: Maine Saosnois

Government
  - Mayor (2020–2026): Sylvie Dubreuil
- Area^{1}: 12.52 km^{2} (4.83 sq mi)
- Highest elevation: 126 m (413 ft)
- Lowest elevation: 68 m (223 ft)
- Population (2023): 387
  - Density: 30.9/km^{2} (80.1/sq mi)
- Demonym(s): Renéen, Renéenne
- Time zone: UTC+01:00 (CET)
  - Summer (DST): UTC+02:00 (CEST)
- INSEE/Postal code: 72251 /72260
- ^{1} French Land Register data, which excludes lakes, ponds, glaciers > 1 km^{2} (0.386 sq mi or 247 acres) and river estuaries.

René is a commune in the Sarthe department in the region of Pays de la Loire in north-western France.

== See also ==
- Communes of the Sarthe department
