= Contilly =

- Commune
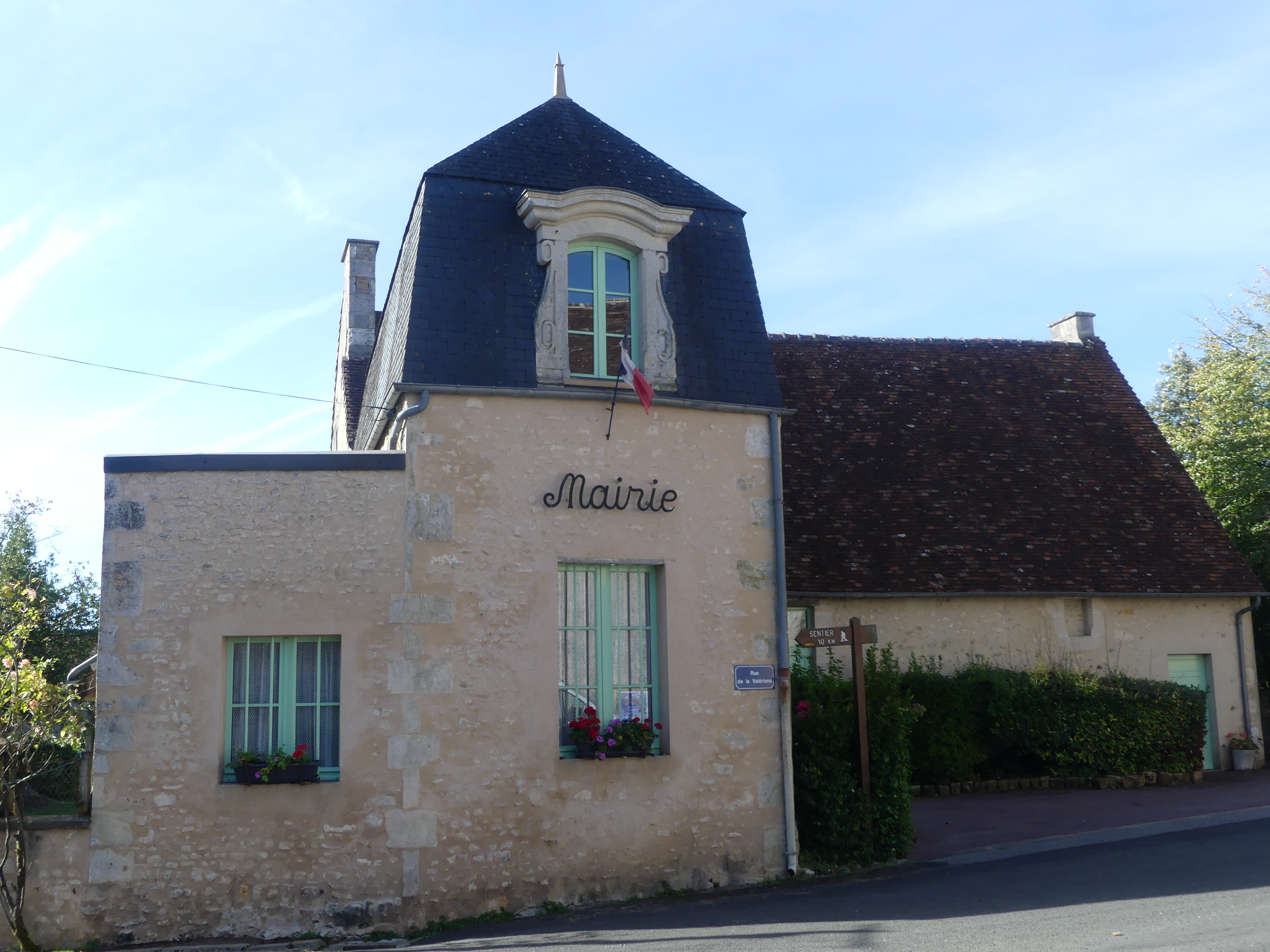
- Contilly Town hall
- Location of Contilly
- Location within France Location within Pays de la Loire
- Coordinates: 48°24′05″N 0°22′10″E
- Country: France
- Region: Pays de la Loire
- Department: Sarthe
- Arrondissement: Mamers
- Canton: Mamers
- Intercommunality: Maine Saosnois

Government
  - Mayor (2020–2026): Sylvie Boulay-Billon
- Area^{1}: 12.48 km^{2} (4.82 sq mi)
- Highest elevation: 217 m (712 ft)
- Lowest elevation: 138 m (453 ft)
- Population (2023): 134
  - Density: 10.7/km^{2} (27.8/sq mi)
- Demonym(s): Contillais, Contillaise
- Time zone: UTC+01:00 (CET)
  - Summer (DST): UTC+02:00 (CEST)
- INSEE/Postal code: 72091 /72600
- ^{1} French Land Register data, which excludes lakes, ponds, glaciers > 1 km^{2} (0.386 sq mi or 247 acres) and river estuaries.

Contilly is a commune in the Sarthe department in the Pays de la Loire region in north-western France.

== Population ==
Historical population
Year	Pop.	±% p.a.
1968	241	—
1975	192	−3.20%
1982	162	−2.40%
1990	172	+0.75%
1999	161	−0.73%
2007	153	−0.64%
2012	140	−1.76%
2017	139	−0.14%
2023	134	−0.61%
Source: INSEE

== See also ==
- Communes of the Sarthe department
