= Avesnes-en-Saosnois =

- Commune
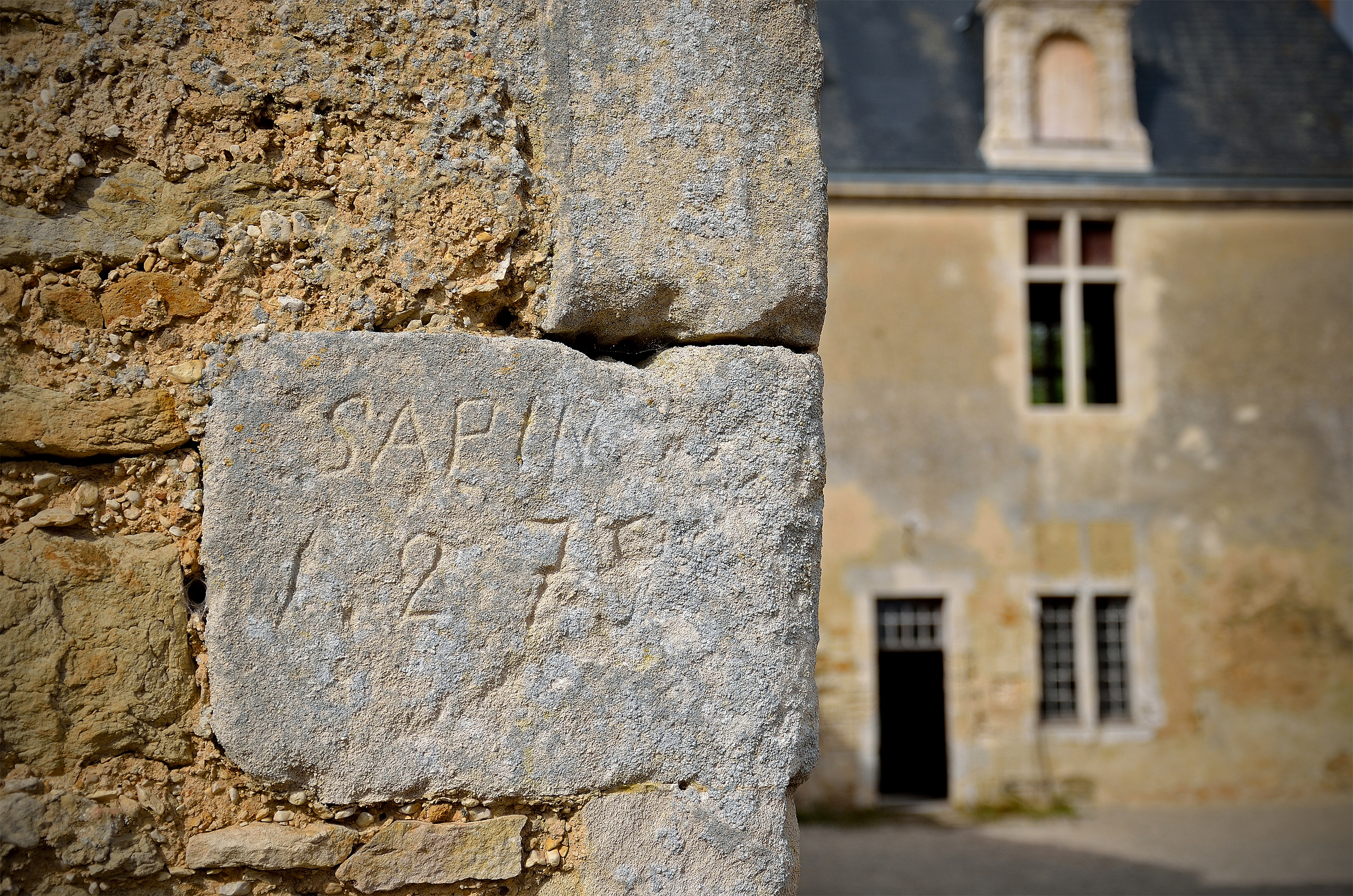
- Verdigné manor
- Location of Avesnes-en-Saosnois
- Location within France Location within Pays de la Loire
- Coordinates: 48°15′51″N 0°22′19″E
- Country: France
- Region: Pays de la Loire
- Department: Sarthe
- Arrondissement: Mamers
- Canton: Mamers
- Intercommunality: CC Maine Saosnois

Government
  - Mayor (2020–2026): Patrice Basselot
- Area^{1}: 5.68 km^{2} (2.19 sq mi)
- Highest elevation: 111 m (364 ft)
- Lowest elevation: 63 m (207 ft)
- Population (2023): 93
  - Density: 16/km^{2} (42/sq mi)
- Demonym(s): Avesnois, Avesnoise
- Time zone: UTC+01:00 (CET)
  - Summer (DST): UTC+02:00 (CEST)
- INSEE/Postal code: 72018 /72260
- ^{1} French Land Register data, which excludes lakes, ponds, glaciers > 1 km^{2} (0.386 sq mi or 247 acres) and river estuaries.

Avesnes-en-Saosnois (French pronunciation: [avɛn ɑ̃ sonwa]) is a commune in the Sarthe department in the region of Pays de la Loire in northwestern France.

== See also ==
- Communes of the Sarthe department
