= Moncé-en-Saosnois =

- Commune
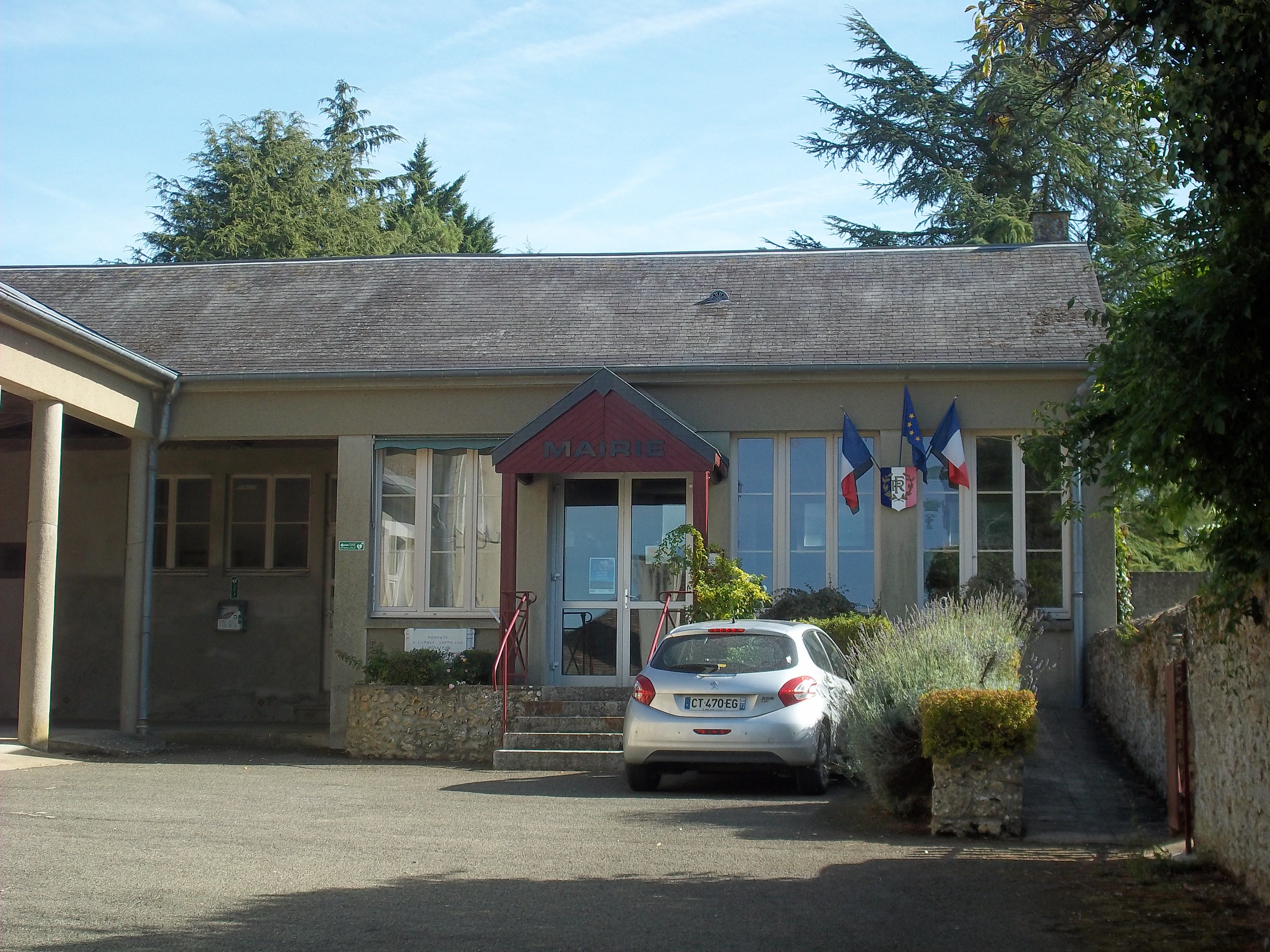
- Moncé-en-Saosnois Town hall
- Location of Moncé-en-Saosnois
- Location within France Location within Pays de la Loire
- Coordinates: 48°16′28″N 0°23′30″E
- Country: France
- Region: Pays de la Loire
- Department: Sarthe
- Arrondissement: Mamers
- Canton: Mamers
- Intercommunality: Maine Saosnois

Government
  - Mayor (2020–2026): Éric Guilmin
- Area^{1}: 8.81 km^{2} (3.40 sq mi)
- Highest elevation: 112 m (367 ft)
- Lowest elevation: 68 m (223 ft)
- Population (2023): 221
  - Density: 25.1/km^{2} (65.0/sq mi)
- Demonym(s): Moncéen, Moncéenne
- Time zone: UTC+01:00 (CET)
  - Summer (DST): UTC+02:00 (CEST)
- INSEE/Postal code: 72201 /72260
- ^{1} French Land Register data, which excludes lakes, ponds, glaciers > 1 km^{2} (0.386 sq mi or 247 acres) and river estuaries.

Moncé-en-Saosnois is a commune in the Sarthe department in the region of Pays de la Loire in north-western France.

== See also ==
- Communes of the Sarthe department
