= Blèves =

- Commune
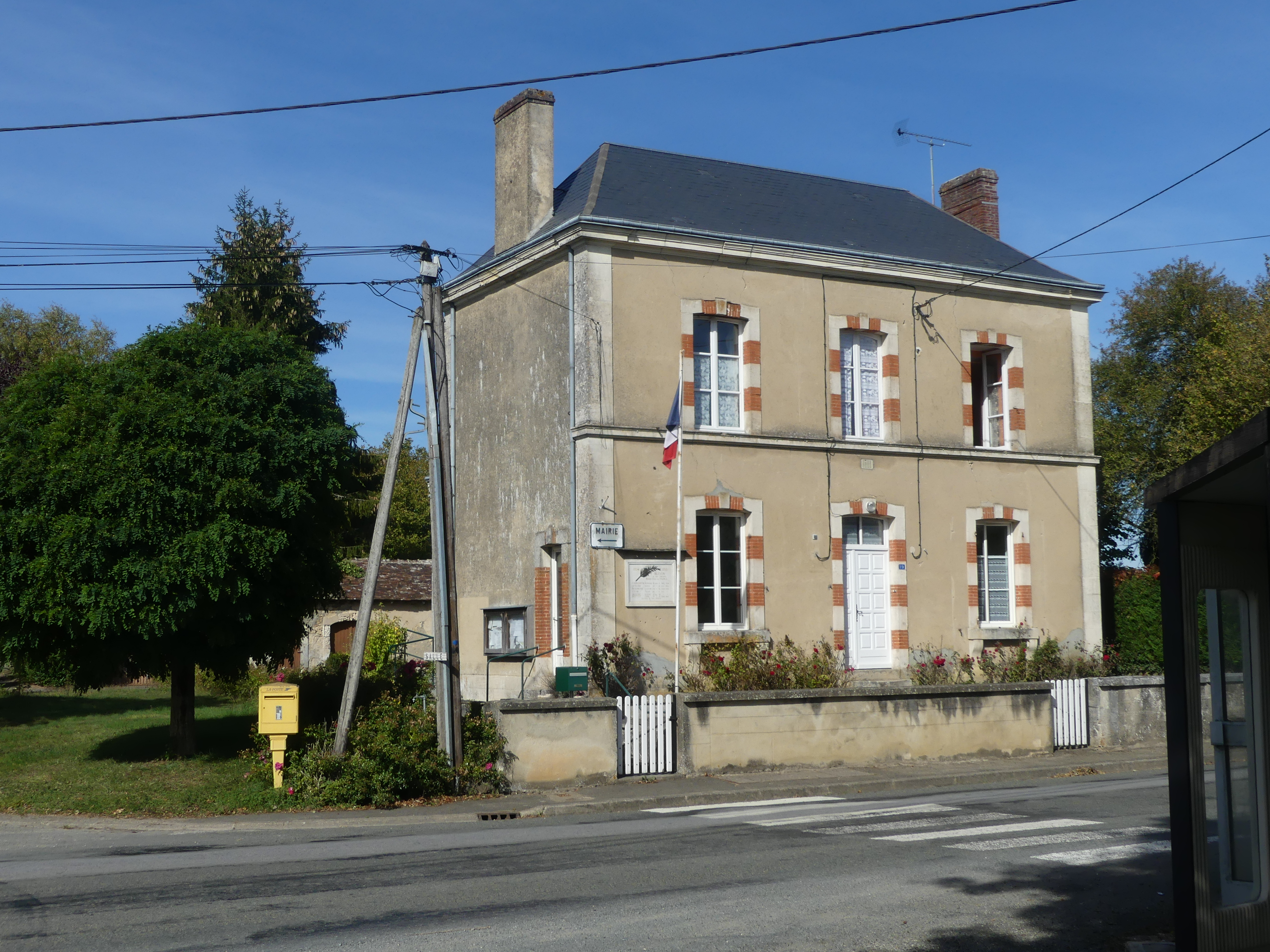
- Blèves Town hall
- Location of Blèves
- Location within France Location within Pays de la Loire
- Coordinates: 48°27′27″N 0°20′50″E
- Country: France
- Region: Pays de la Loire
- Department: Sarthe
- Arrondissement: Mamers
- Canton: Mamers
- Intercommunality: Maine Saosnois

Government
  - Mayor (2020–2026): Fabrice Meunier
- Area^{1}: 2.04 km^{2} (0.79 sq mi)
- Highest elevation: 170 m (560 ft)
- Lowest elevation: 141 m (463 ft)
- Population (2023): 128
  - Density: 62.7/km^{2} (163/sq mi)
- Demonym(s): Blévois, Blévoise
- Time zone: UTC+01:00 (CET)
  - Summer (DST): UTC+02:00 (CEST)
- INSEE/Postal code: 72037 /72600
- ^{1} French Land Register data, which excludes lakes, ponds, glaciers > 1 km^{2} (0.386 sq mi or 247 acres) and river estuaries.

Blèves (French pronunciation: [blɛv]) is a commune in the Sarthe department in the region of Pays de la Loire in north-western France. The population of Blèves was 112 in 2018.

== Geography ==
A river, La Pervenche, flows through the commune.

== See also ==
- Communes of the Sarthe department
