= La Chapelle-Huon =

- Commune
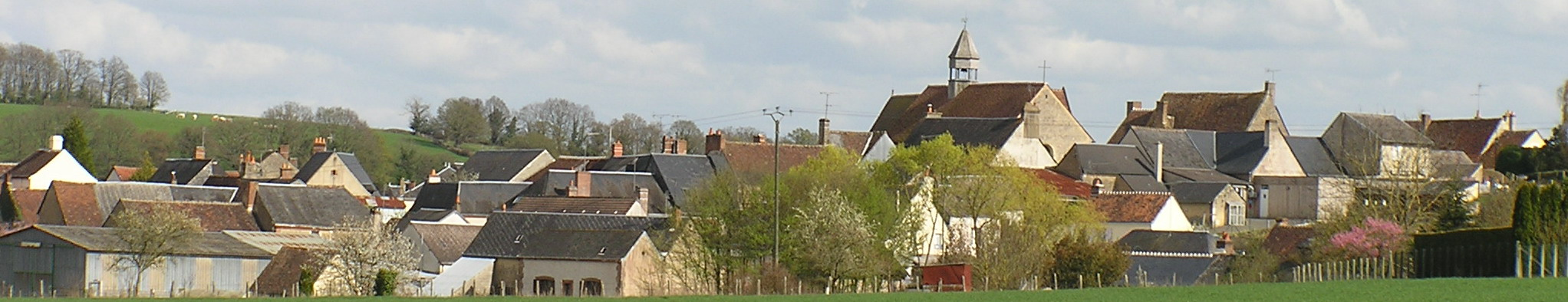
- A general view of La Chapelle-Huon
- Location of La Chapelle-Huon
- Location within France Location within Pays de la Loire
- Coordinates: 47°51′23″N 0°44′37″E
- Country: France
- Region: Pays de la Loire
- Department: Sarthe
- Arrondissement: Mamers
- Canton: Saint-Calais
- Intercommunality: Vallées de la Braye et de l'Anille

Government
  - Mayor (2020–2026): Philippe Lebert
- Area^{1}: 18.7 km^{2} (7.2 sq mi)
- Population (2023): 513
  - Density: 27.4/km^{2} (71.1/sq mi)
- Demonym(s): Capellhuonnais, Capellhuonnaise
- Time zone: UTC+01:00 (CET)
  - Summer (DST): UTC+02:00 (CEST)
- INSEE/Postal code: 72064 /72310
- ^{1} French Land Register data, which excludes lakes, ponds, glaciers > 1 km^{2} (0.386 sq mi or 247 acres) and river estuaries.

La Chapelle-Huon (French pronunciation: [la ʃapɛl ɥɔ̃]) is a commune in the Sarthe department in the Pays de la Loire region in north-western France. Its inhabitants are called Capellhuonnais and Capellhuonnaises.

== Name ==
La Chapelle-Huon (Latin: Capella Hugonis) is named after one of its ancient lords, named Hugo. His name appears for the first time in 1233 under the name of Capella Parrochia Hugonie.

== Geography ==
La Chapelle-Huon is located 7.5 km from Saint-Calais and 44 miles from Le Mans, and once depended on the deanery of Saint-Calais, the Archdeaconry of Montfort, and the diocese of Le Mans. It is in the department of Sarthe, which is since 1790 the eastern part of the former province of Maine. This town is bounded on the north by Saint-Gervais-de-Vic, on the east by Savigny-sur-Braye, south by Besse-sur-Braye, and west by Cogners. Egg-shaped, it extends the SSO NO. The village forms several small streets north of the church, and a row of houses to the west.

== See also ==
- Communes of the Sarthe department
