= Arrondissement of Mamers =

Coordinates: 48°21′N 0°22′E

Mamers
- Arrondissement
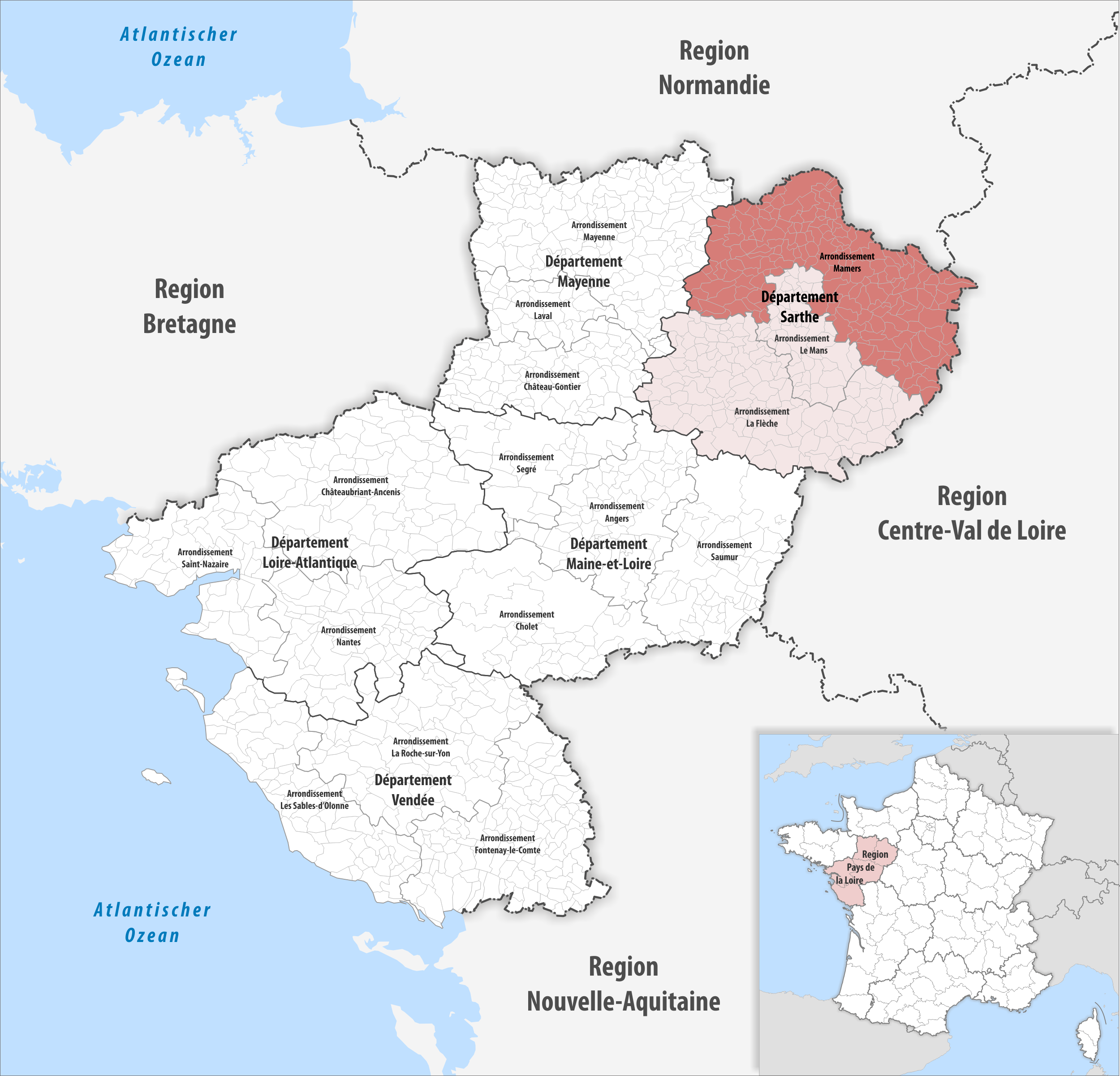
- Location within the region Pays de la Loire
- Country: France
- Region: Pays de la Loire
- Department: Sarthe
- No. of communes: {{{nbcomm}}}
- Area: 2,904.9 km^{2} (1,121.6 sq mi)
- Population (2023): 148,968
  - Density: 51.282/km^{2} (132.82/sq mi)
- INSEE code: 722

The arrondissement of Mamers is an arrondissement of France in the Sarthe department in the Pays de la Loire region. It has 190 communes. Its population is 149,694 (2021), and its area is 2,904.9 km^{2} (1,121.6 sq mi).

== Composition ==
The communes of the arrondissement of Mamers, and their INSEE codes, are:

1. Aillières-Beauvoir (72002)
2. Ancinnes (72005)
3. Arçonnay (72006)
4. Ardenay-sur-Mérize (72007)
5. Assé-le-Boisne (72011)
6. Assé-le-Riboul (72012)
7. Les Aulneaux (72015)
8. Avesnes-en-Saosnois (72018)
9. Avezé (72020)
10. Beaufay (72026)
11. Beaumont-sur-Sarthe (72029)
12. Beillé (72031)
13. Berfay (72032)
14. Bernay-Neuvy-en-Champagne (72219)
15. Bérus (72034)
16. Bessé-sur-Braye (72035)
17. Béthon (72036)
18. Blèves (72037)
19. Boëssé-le-Sec (72038)
20. Bonnétable (72039)
21. La Bosse (72040)
22. Bouër (72041)
23. Bouloire (72042)
24. Bourg-le-Roi (72043)
25. Le Breil-sur-Mérize (72046)
26. Briosne-lès-Sables (72048)
27. Champfleur (72056)
28. Champrond (72057)
29. La Chapelle-du-Bois (72062)
30. La Chapelle-Huon (72064)
31. La Chapelle-Saint-Fray (72066)
32. La Chapelle-Saint-Rémy (72067)
33. Chenay (72076)
34. Chérancé (72078)
35. Chérisay (72079)
36. Cherré-Au (72080)
37. Cogners (72085)
38. Commerveil (72086)
39. Conflans-sur-Anille (72087)
40. Congé-sur-Orne (72088)
41. Conlie (72089)
42. Connerré (72090)
43. Contilly (72091)
44. Cormes (72093)
45. Coudrecieux (72094)
46. Courcemont (72101)
47. Courcival (72102)
48. Courgains (72104)
49. Courgenard (72105)
50. Crissé (72109)
51. Cures (72111)
52. Dangeul (72112)
53. Degré (72113)
54. Dehault (72114)
55. Dollon (72118)
56. Domfront-en-Champagne (72119)
57. Doucelles (72120)
58. Douillet (72121)
59. Duneau (72122)
60. Écorpain (72125)
61. Fatines (72129)
62. La Ferté-Bernard (72132)
63. Fresnay-sur-Sarthe (72138)
64. Fyé (72139)
65. Gesnes-le-Gandelin (72141)
66. Grandchamp (72142)
67. Gréez-sur-Roc (72144)
68. Le Grez (72145)
69. Jauzé (72148)
70. Juillé (72152)
71. Lamnay (72156)
72. Lavardin (72157)
73. Lavaré (72158)
74. Livet-en-Saosnois (72164)
75. Lombron (72165)
76. Louvigny (72170)
77. Louzes (72171)
78. Le Luart (72172)
79. Lucé-sous-Ballon (72174)
80. Maisoncelles (72178)
81. Mamers (72180)
82. Maresché (72186)
83. Marolles-les-Braults (72189)
84. Marolles-lès-Saint-Calais (72190)
85. Marollette (72188)
86. Les Mées (72192)
87. Melleray (72193)
88. Meurcé (72194)
89. Mézières-sous-Lavardin (72197)
90. Mézières-sur-Ponthouin (72196)
91. Moitron-sur-Sarthe (72199)
92. Moncé-en-Saosnois (72201)
93. Monhoudou (72202)
94. Montaillé (72204)
95. Montfort-le-Gesnois (72241)
96. Montmirail (72208)
97. Montreuil-le-Chétif (72209)
98. Mont-Saint-Jean (72211)
99. Moulins-le-Carbonnel (72212)
100. Nauvay (72214)
101. Neufchâtel-en-Saosnois (72215)
102. Neuvillalais (72216)
103. Neuvillette-en-Charnie (72218)
104. Nogent-le-Bernard (72220)
105. Nouans (72222)
106. Nuillé-le-Jalais (72224)
107. Oisseau-le-Petit (72225)
108. Panon (72227)
109. Parennes (72229)
110. Peray (72233)
111. Pezé-le-Robert (72234)
112. Piacé (72235)
113. Pizieux (72238)
114. Préval (72245)
115. Prévelles (72246)
116. La Quinte (72249)
117. Rahay (72250)
118. René (72251)
119. Rouessé-Fontaine (72254)
120. Rouessé-Vassé (72255)
121. Rouez (72256)
122. Rouperroux-le-Coquet (72259)
123. Ruillé-en-Champagne (72261)
124. Saint-Aignan (72265)
125. Saint-Aubin-de-Locquenay (72266)
126. Saint-Aubin-des-Coudrais (72267)
127. Saint-Calais (72269)
128. Saint-Calez-en-Saosnois (72270)
129. Saint-Célerin (72271)
130. Saint-Christophe-du-Jambet (72273)
131. Saint-Corneille (72275)
132. Saint-Cosme-en-Vairais (72276)
133. Saint-Denis-des-Coudrais (72277)
134. Sainte-Cérotte (72272)
135. Sainte-Sabine-sur-Longève (72319)
136. Saint-Georges-du-Rosay (72281)
137. Saint-Georges-le-Gaultier (72282)
138. Saint-Gervais-de-Vic (72286)
139. Saint-Jean-des-Échelles (72292)
140. Saint-Léonard-des-Bois (72294)
141. Saint-Longis (72295)
142. Saint-Maixent (72296)
143. Saint-Marceau (72297)
144. Saint-Mars-la-Brière (72300)
145. Saint-Martin-des-Monts (72302)
146. Saint-Michel-de-Chavaignes (72303)
147. Saint-Ouen-de-Mimbré (72305)
148. Saint Paterne - Le Chevain (72308)
149. Saint-Paul-le-Gaultier (72309)
150. Saint-Pierre-des-Ormes (72313)
151. Saint-Rémy-de-Sillé (72315)
152. Saint-Rémy-des-Monts (72316)
153. Saint-Rémy-du-Val (72317)
154. Saint-Symphorien (72321)
155. Saint-Ulphace (72322)
156. Saint-Victeur (72323)
157. Saint-Vincent-des-Prés (72324)
158. Saosnes (72326)
159. Savigné-l'Évêque (72329)
160. Sceaux-sur-Huisne (72331)
161. Ségrie (72332)
162. Semur-en-Vallon (72333)
163. Sillé-le-Guillaume (72334)
164. Sillé-le-Philippe (72335)
165. Sougé-le-Ganelon (72337)
166. Soulitré (72341)
167. Souvigné-sur-Même (72342)
168. Surfonds (72345)
169. Tennie (72351)
170. Terrehault (72352)
171. Théligny (72353)
172. Thoigné (72354)
173. Thoiré-sous-Contensor (72355)
174. Thorigné-sur-Dué (72358)
175. Torcé-en-Vallée (72359)
176. Tresson (72361)
177. Le Tronchet (72362)
178. Tuffé-Val-de-la-Chéronne (72363)
179. Val-de-la-Hune (72382)
180. Val-d'Étangson (72128)
181. Valennes (72366)
182. Vancé (72368)
183. Vernie (72370)
184. Vezot (72372)
185. Vibraye (72373)
186. Villaines-la-Carelle (72374)
187. Villaines-la-Gonais (72375)
188. Villeneuve-en-Perseigne (72137)
189. Vivoin (72380)
190. Vouvray-sur-Huisne (72383)

== History ==
The arrondissement of Mamers was created in 1800. In February 2006 it absorbed the six cantons of Bouloire, Conlie, Montfort-le-Gesnois, Saint-Calais, Sillé-le-Guillaume and Vibraye from the arrondissement of Le Mans. In August 2012 the commune Champagné passed from the arrondissement of Mamers to the arrondissement of Le Mans, and the communes Beaufay, Courcemont and Savigné-l'Évêque passed from the arrondissement of Le Mans to the arrondissement of Mamers.

As a result of the reorganisation of the cantons of France which came into effect in 2015, the borders of the cantons are no longer related to the borders of the arrondissements. The cantons of the arrondissement of Mamers were, as of January 2015:

1. Beaumont-sur-Sarthe
2. Bonnétable
3. Bouloire
4. Conlie
5. La Ferté-Bernard
6. La Fresnaye-sur-Chédouet
7. Fresnay-sur-Sarthe
8. Mamers
9. Marolles-les-Braults
10. Montfort-le-Gesnois
11. Montmirail
12. Saint-Calais
13. Saint-Paterne
14. Sillé-le-Guillaume
15. Tuffé
16. Vibraye
