= Marolles-lès-Saint-Calais =

- Commune
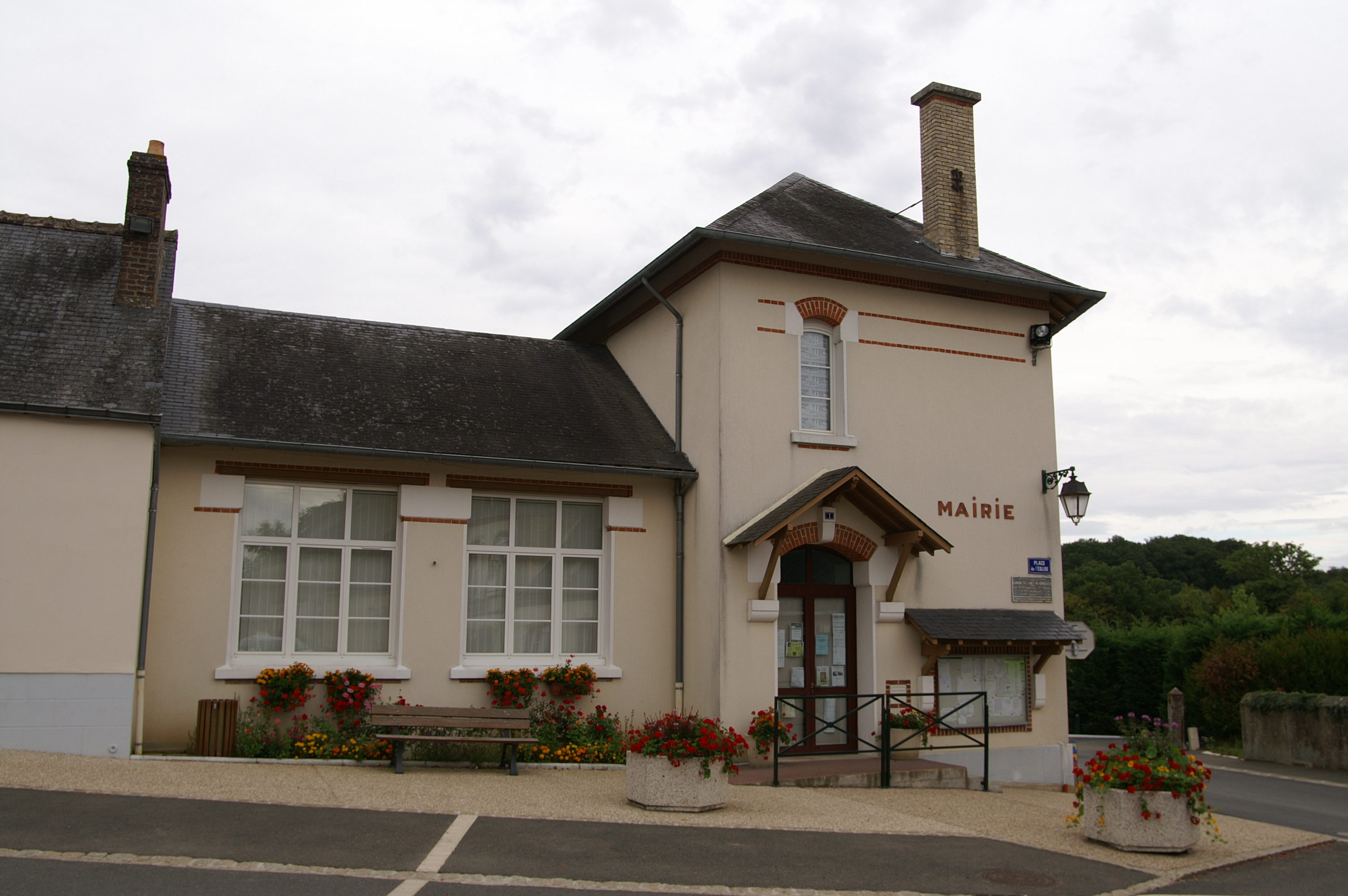
- The town hall

- Coat of arms
- Location of Marolles-lès-Saint-Calais
- Location within France Location within Pays de la Loire
- Coordinates: 47°55′12″N 0°47′09″E
- Country: France
- Region: Pays de la Loire
- Department: Sarthe
- Arrondissement: Mamers
- Canton: Saint-Calais
- Intercommunality: Vallées de la Braye et de l'Anille

Government
  - Mayor (2020–2026): Annie Jumert
- Area^{1}: 12.1 km^{2} (4.7 sq mi)
- Population (2023): 284
  - Density: 23.5/km^{2} (60.8/sq mi)
- Demonym(s): Marollais, Marollaise
- Time zone: UTC+01:00 (CET)
  - Summer (DST): UTC+02:00 (CEST)
- INSEE/Postal code: 72190 /72120
- ^{1} French Land Register data, which excludes lakes, ponds, glaciers > 1 km^{2} (0.386 sq mi or 247 acres) and river estuaries.

Marolles-lès-Saint-Calais (French pronunciation: [maʁɔl lɛ sɛ̃ kalɛ], literally Marolles near Saint-Calais) is a commune in the Sarthe department in the region of Pays de la Loire in north-western France.

== See also ==
- Communes of the Sarthe department
