= Saint-Michel-de-Chavaignes =

- Commune
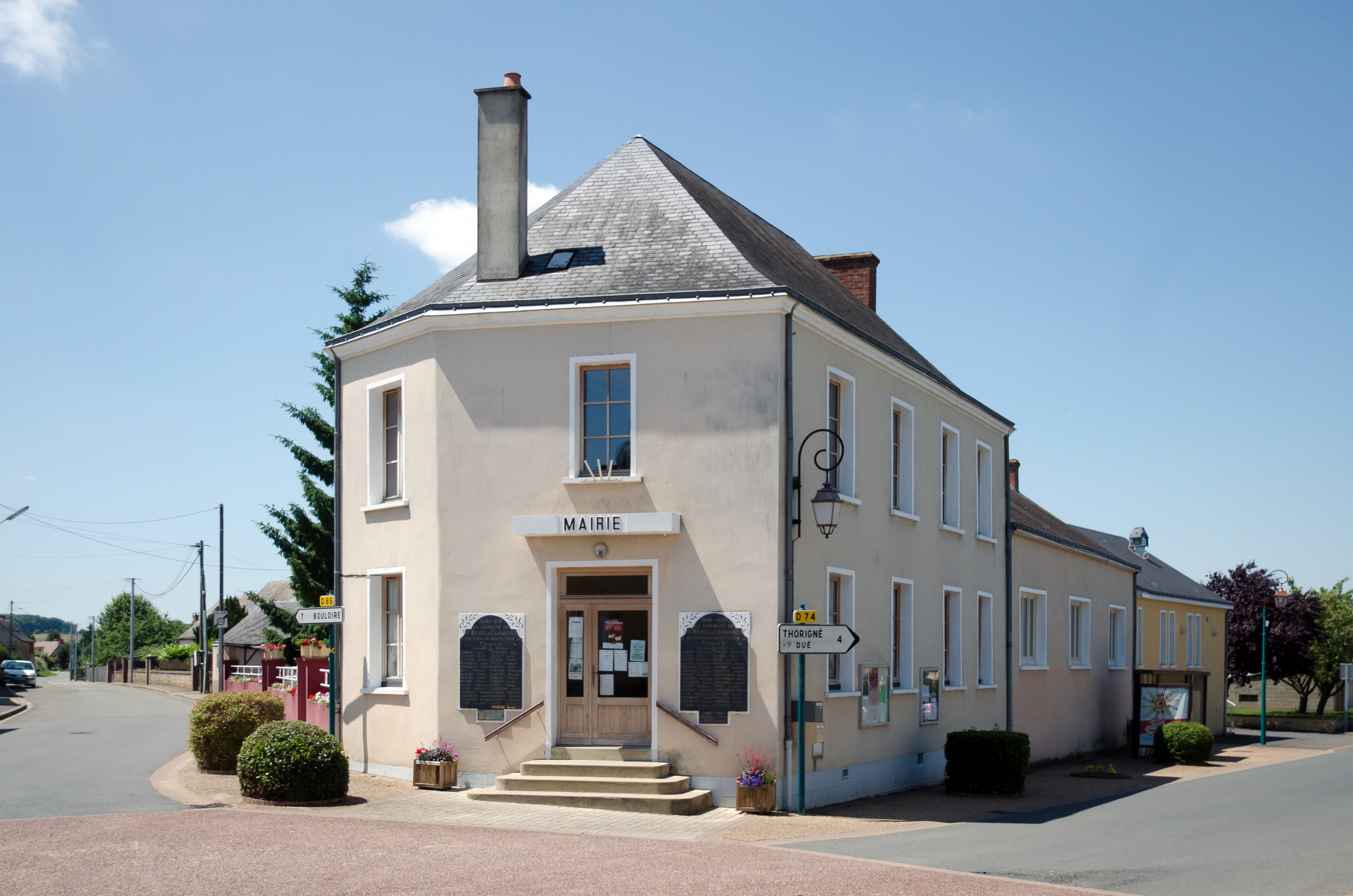
- The town hall of Saint-Michel-de-Chavaignes
- Location of Saint-Michel-de-Chavaignes
- Location within France Location within Pays de la Loire
- Coordinates: 48°01′01″N 0°34′24″E
- Country: France
- Region: Pays de la Loire
- Department: Sarthe
- Arrondissement: Mamers
- Canton: Saint-Calais
- Intercommunality: Le Gesnois Bilurien

Government
  - Mayor (2020–2026): Michel Froger
- Area^{1}: 18.37 km^{2} (7.09 sq mi)
- Highest elevation: 158 m (518 ft)
- Lowest elevation: 78 m (256 ft)
- Population (2023): 737
  - Density: 40.1/km^{2} (104/sq mi)
- Demonym(s): Chavaignais, Chavaignaise
- Time zone: UTC+01:00 (CET)
  - Summer (DST): UTC+02:00 (CEST)
- INSEE/Postal code: 72303 /72440
- ^{1} French Land Register data, which excludes lakes, ponds, glaciers > 1 km^{2} (0.386 sq mi or 247 acres) and river estuaries.

Saint-Michel-de-Chavaignes (French pronunciation: [sɛ̃ miʃɛl də ʃavɛɲ]) is a commune in the Sarthe department in the region of Pays de la Loire in north-western France.

== See also ==
- Communes of the Sarthe department
