= Saint-Maixent, Sarthe =

Saint-Maixent
- Commune
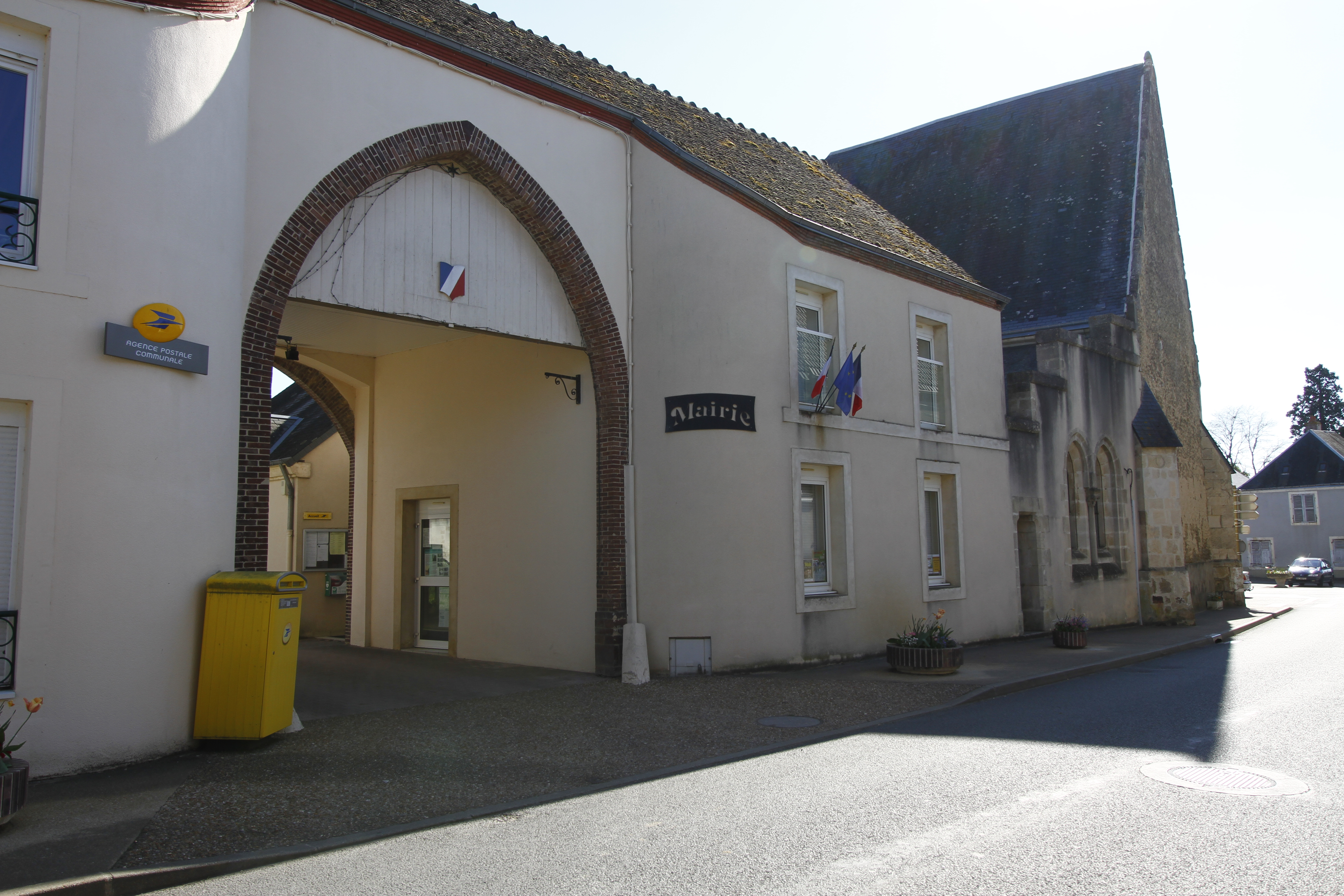
- The town hall of Saint-Maixent.
- Location of Saint-Maixent
- Location within France Location within Pays de la Loire
- Coordinates: 48°05′23″N 0°39′12″E
- Country: France
- Region: Pays de la Loire
- Department: Sarthe
- Arrondissement: Mamers
- Canton: Saint-Calais
- Intercommunality: CC du Perche Emeraude

Government
  - Mayor (2020–2026): Éric Barbier
- Area^{1}: 22.48 km^{2} (8.68 sq mi)
- Highest elevation: 197 m (646 ft)
- Lowest elevation: 75 m (246 ft)
- Population (2023): 741
  - Density: 33.0/km^{2} (85.4/sq mi)
- Demonym(s): Saint-Maixentais, Saint-Maixentaise
- Time zone: UTC+01:00 (CET)
  - Summer (DST): UTC+02:00 (CEST)
- INSEE/Postal code: 72296 /72320
- ^{1} French Land Register data, which excludes lakes, ponds, glaciers > 1 km^{2} (0.386 sq mi or 247 acres) and river estuaries.

Saint-Maixent (French pronunciation: [sɛ̃ mɛksɑ̃]) is a commune in the Sarthe department, in the region of Pays de la Loire, northwestern France.

== See also ==
- Communes of the Sarthe department
