= Écorpain =

- Commune
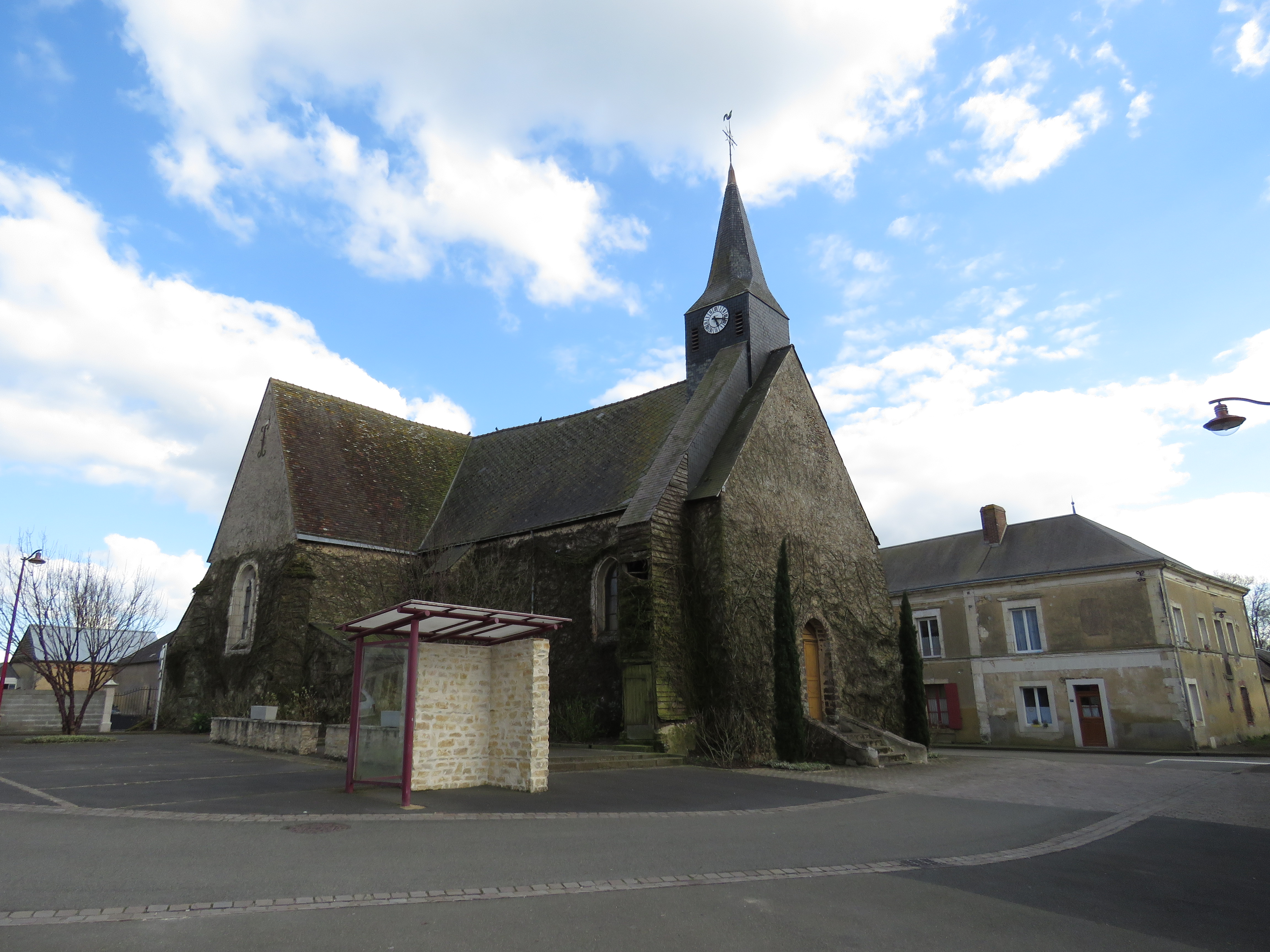
- The church of Saint Pierre
- Location of Écorpain
- Location within France Location within Pays de la Loire
- Coordinates: 47°56′16″N 0°39′46″E
- Country: France
- Region: Pays de la Loire
- Department: Sarthe
- Arrondissement: Mamers
- Canton: Saint-Calais
- Intercommunality: Vallées de la Braye et de l'Anille

Government
  - Mayor (2020–2026): Sébastien Morin
- Area^{1}: 21.26 km^{2} (8.21 sq mi)
- Highest elevation: 181 m (594 ft)
- Lowest elevation: 128 m (420 ft)
- Population (2023): 296
  - Density: 13.9/km^{2} (36.1/sq mi)
- Demonym(s): Ecorpinois, Ecorpinoise
- Time zone: UTC+01:00 (CET)
  - Summer (DST): UTC+02:00 (CEST)
- INSEE/Postal code: 72125 /72120
- ^{1} French Land Register data, which excludes lakes, ponds, glaciers > 1 km^{2} (0.386 sq mi or 247 acres) and river estuaries.

Écorpain (French pronunciation: [ekɔʁpɛ̃]) is a commune in the Sarthe department in the Pays de la Loire region in north-western France.

== See also ==
- Communes of the Sarthe department
