= Bouloire =

- Commune
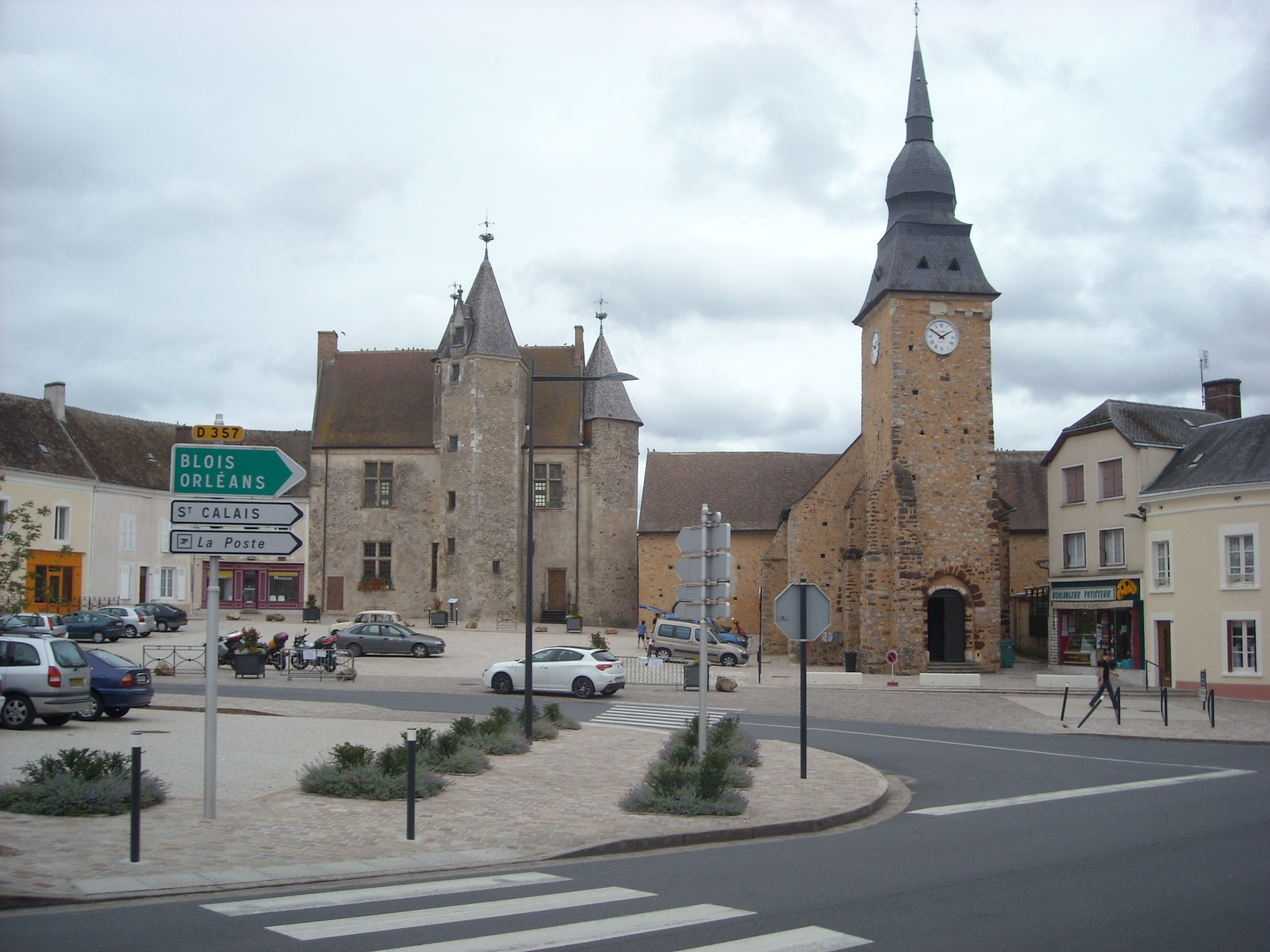
- The church of Saint-Georges and the place of the Château
- Location of Bouloire
- Location within France Location within Pays de la Loire
- Coordinates: 47°58′28″N 0°33′00″E
- Country: France
- Region: Pays de la Loire
- Department: Sarthe
- Arrondissement: Mamers
- Canton: Saint-Calais
- Intercommunality: Le Gesnois Bilurien

Government
  - Mayor (2020–2026): Anne-Marie Deloubes
- Area^{1}: 26.77 km^{2} (10.34 sq mi)
- Highest elevation: 176 m (577 ft)
- Lowest elevation: 98 m (322 ft)
- Population (2023): 2,127
  - Density: 79.45/km^{2} (205.8/sq mi)
- Demonym(s): Bilurien, Bilurienne
- Time zone: UTC+01:00 (CET)
  - Summer (DST): UTC+02:00 (CEST)
- INSEE/Postal code: 72042 /72440
- ^{1} French Land Register data, which excludes lakes, ponds, glaciers > 1 km^{2} (0.386 sq mi or 247 acres) and river estuaries.

Bouloire (French pronunciation: [bulwaʁ]) is a commune in the Sarthe department in the region of Pays de la Loire in north-western France.

== Population ==
Historical population
Year	Pop.	±% p.a.
1968	1,532	—
1975	1,433	−0.95%
1982	1,594	+1.53%
1990	1,829	+1.73%
1999	1,883	+0.32%
2007	1,989	+0.69%
2012	2,081	+0.91%
2017	2,082	+0.01%
2023	2,127	+0.36%
Source: INSEE

== See also ==
- Communes of the Sarthe department
