= Sainte-Cérotte =

- Commune
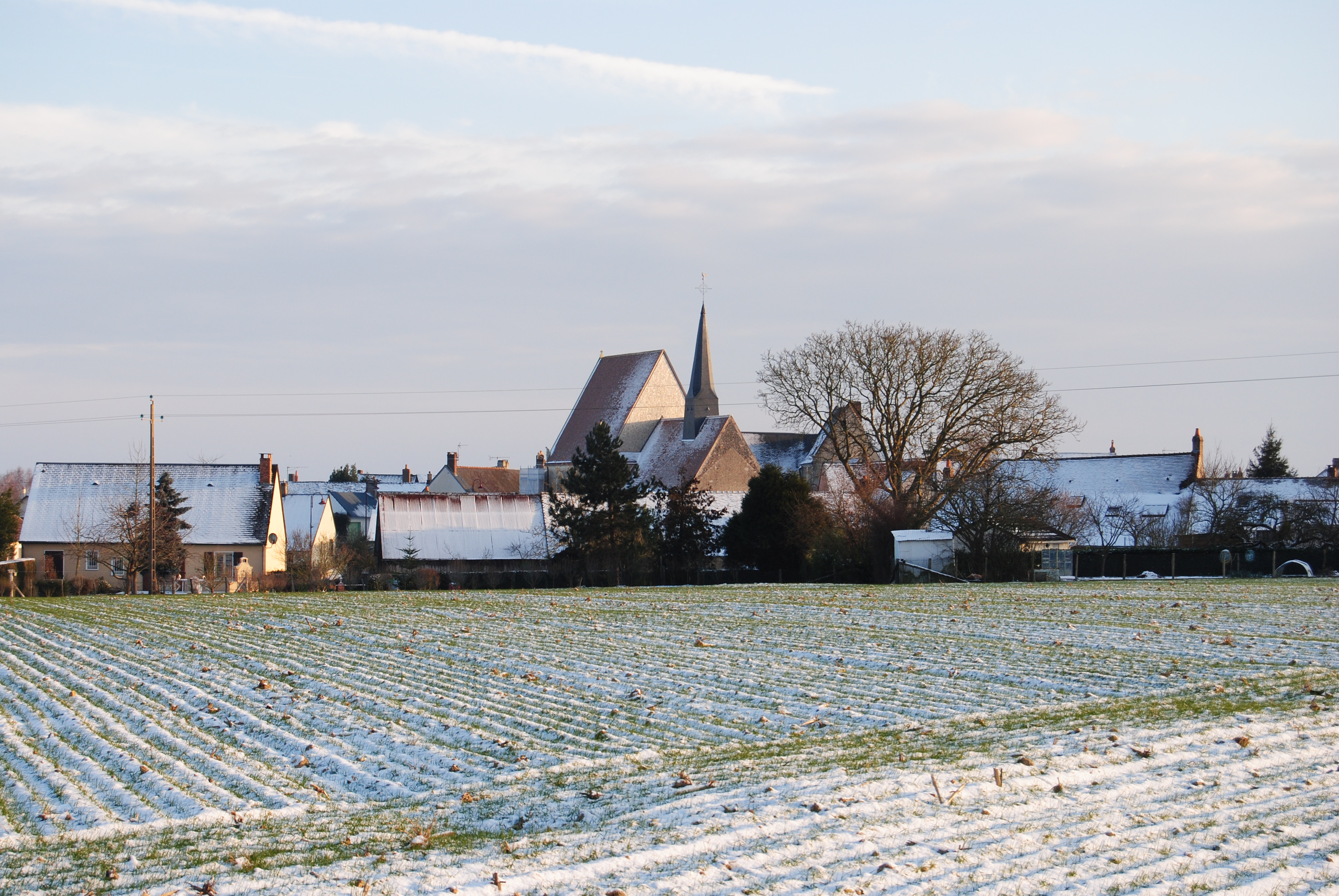
- The village in the snow

- Coat of arms
- Location of Sainte-Cérotte
- Location within France Location within Pays de la Loire
- Coordinates: 47°54′04″N 0°41′13″E
- Country: France
- Region: Pays de la Loire
- Department: Sarthe
- Arrondissement: Mamers
- Canton: Saint-Calais
- Intercommunality: Vallées de la Braye et de l'Anille

Government
  - Mayor (2020–2026): Yves Foucault
- Area^{1}: 14.36 km^{2} (5.54 sq mi)
- Highest elevation: 167 m (548 ft)
- Lowest elevation: 104 m (341 ft)
- Population (2023): 337
  - Density: 23.5/km^{2} (60.8/sq mi)
- Demonym(s): Cérottois, Cérottoise
- Time zone: UTC+01:00 (CET)
  - Summer (DST): UTC+02:00 (CEST)
- INSEE/Postal code: 72272 /72120
- ^{1} French Land Register data, which excludes lakes, ponds, glaciers > 1 km^{2} (0.386 sq mi or 247 acres) and river estuaries.

Sainte-Cérotte (French pronunciation: [sɛ̃t seʁɔt]) is a commune in the Sarthe department in the region of Pays de la Loire in north-western France.

== See also ==
- Communes of the Sarthe department
