= Maisoncelles, Sarthe =

Maisoncelles
- Commune
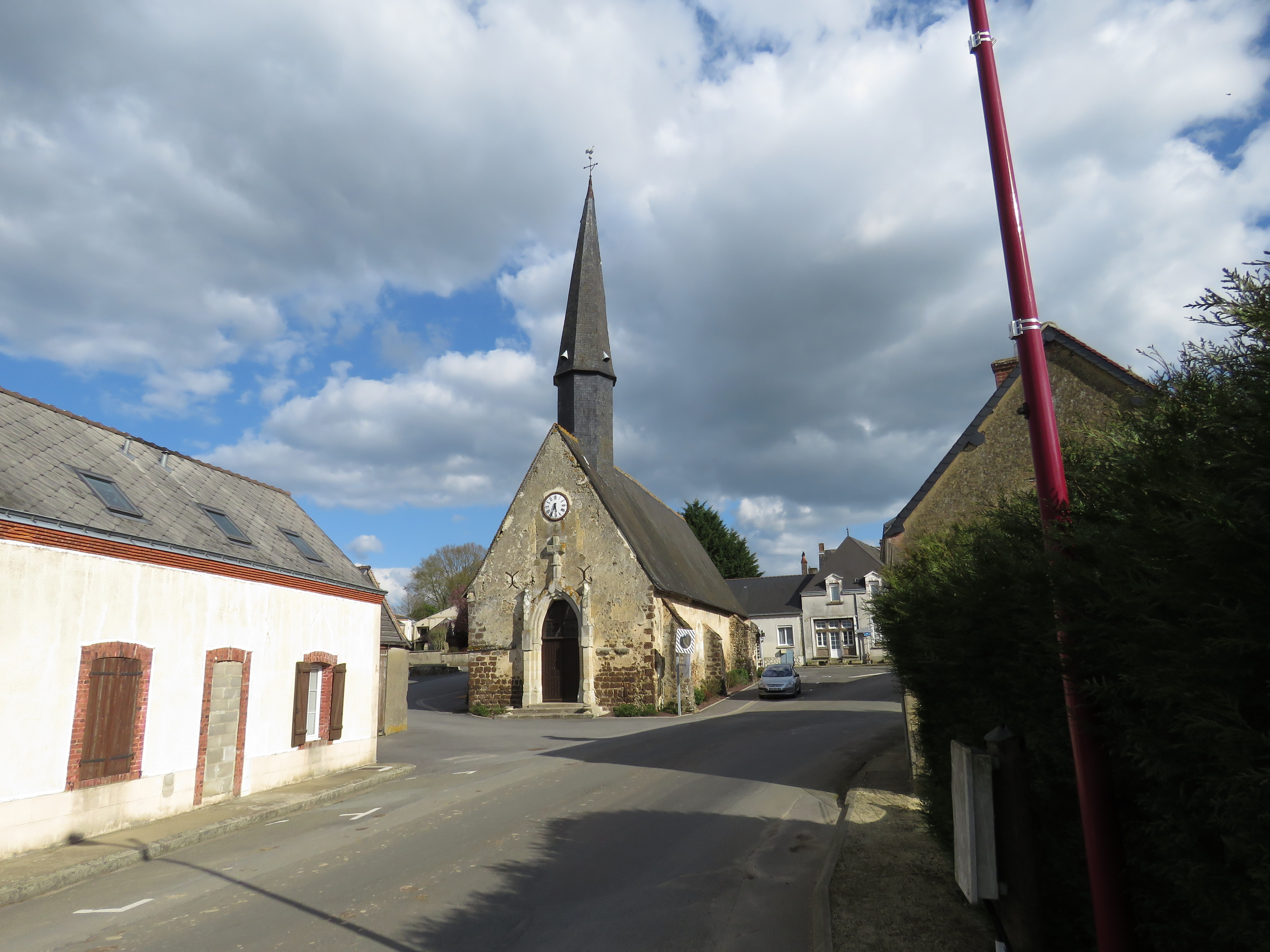
- The church of Notre-Dame
- Location of Maisoncelles
- Location within France Location within Pays de la Loire
- Coordinates: 47°56′12″N 0°34′24″E
- Country: France
- Region: Pays de la Loire
- Department: Sarthe
- Arrondissement: Mamers
- Canton: Saint-Calais
- Intercommunality: Le Gesnois Bilurien

Government
  - Mayor (2020–2026): Dominique Drouet
- Area^{1}: 11.3 km^{2} (4.4 sq mi)
- Population (2023): 201
  - Density: 17.8/km^{2} (46.1/sq mi)
- Time zone: UTC+01:00 (CET)
  - Summer (DST): UTC+02:00 (CEST)
- INSEE/Postal code: 72178 /72440
- ^{1} French Land Register data, which excludes lakes, ponds, glaciers > 1 km^{2} (0.386 sq mi or 247 acres) and river estuaries.

Maisoncelles (French pronunciation: [mɛzɔ̃sɛl]) is a commune in the Sarthe department in the region of Pays de la Loire in north-western France.

== See also ==
- Communes of the Sarthe department
