= Thorigné-sur-Dué =

- Commune
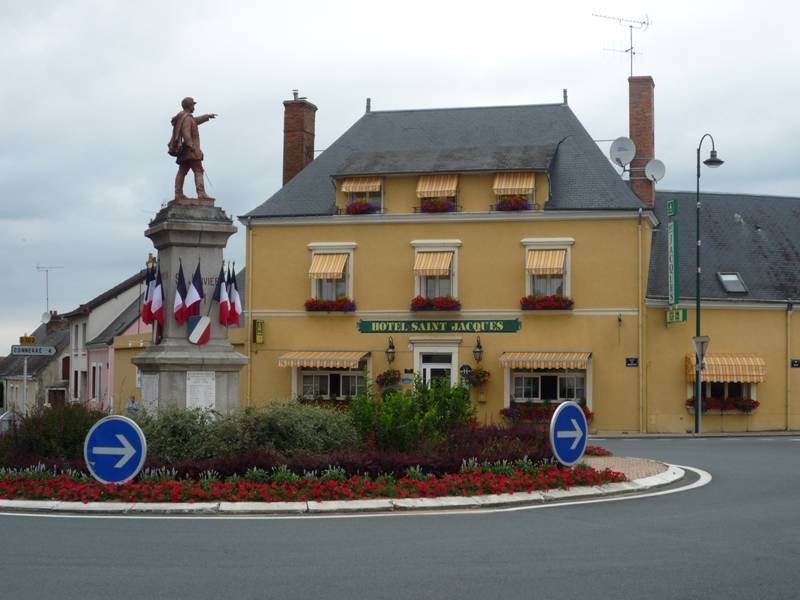
- The monument to the dead
- Location of Thorigné-sur-Dué
- Location within France Location within Pays de la Loire
- Coordinates: 48°02′22″N 0°32′07″E
- Country: France
- Region: Pays de la Loire
- Department: Sarthe
- Arrondissement: Mamers
- Canton: Saint-Calais
- Intercommunality: Le Gesnois Bilurien

Government
  - Mayor (2020–2026): Nathalie Gauthier Chailloux
- Area^{1}: 19.3 km^{2} (7.5 sq mi)
- Population (2023): 1,637
  - Density: 84.8/km^{2} (220/sq mi)
- Demonym(s): Thorignéen, Thorignéenne
- Time zone: UTC+01:00 (CET)
  - Summer (DST): UTC+02:00 (CEST)
- INSEE/Postal code: 72358 /72160
- ^{1} French Land Register data, which excludes lakes, ponds, glaciers > 1 km^{2} (0.386 sq mi or 247 acres) and river estuaries.

Thorigné-sur-Dué (French pronunciation: [tɔʁiɲe syʁ dɥe]) is a commune in the Sarthe department in the region of Pays de la Loire in north-western France.

== See also ==
- Communes of the Sarthe department
