= Montaillé =

- Commune
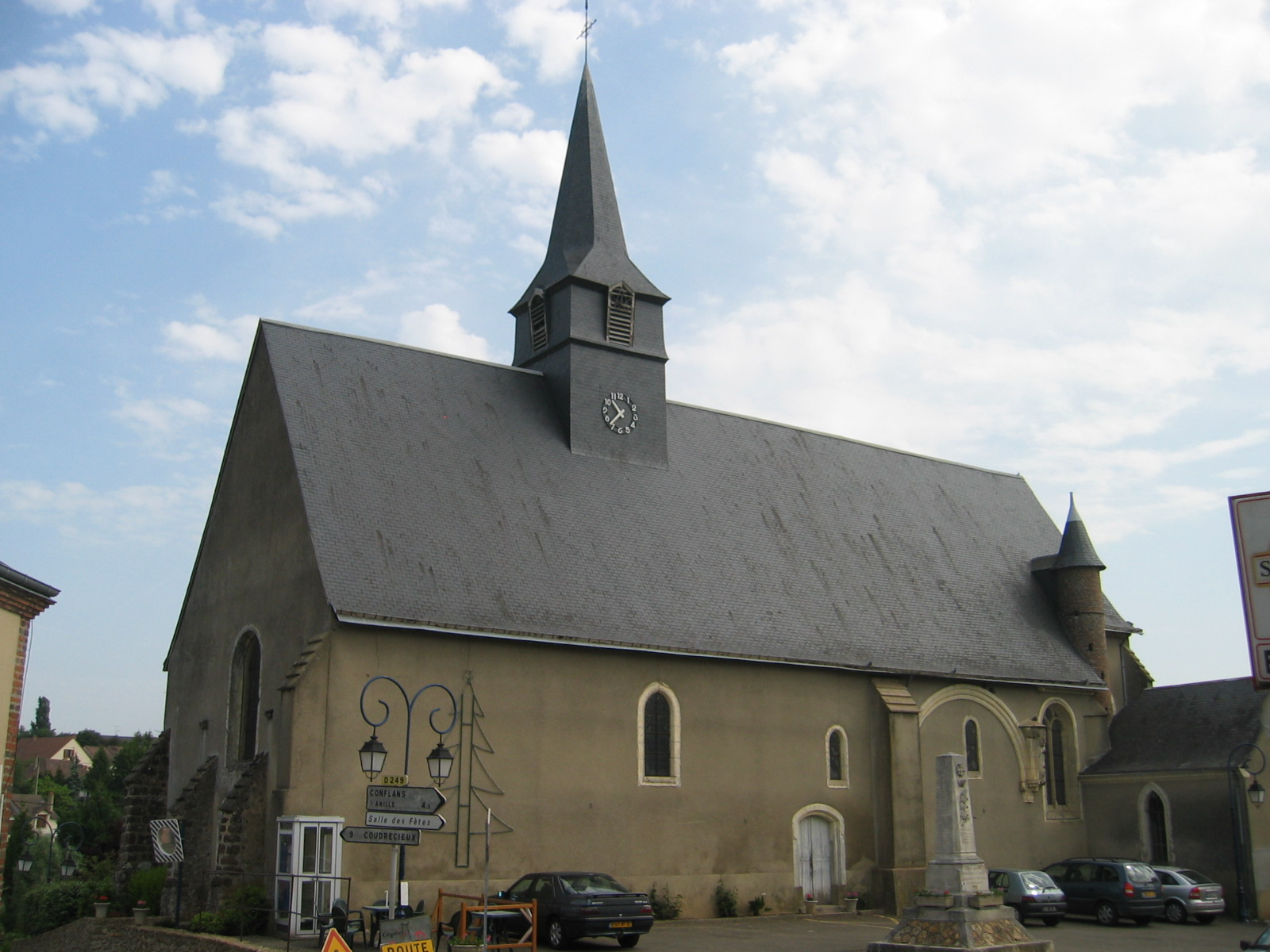
- The church of Saint-Jean-Baptiste, in Montaillé
- Location of Montaillé
- Location within France Location within Pays de la Loire
- Coordinates: 47°56′06″N 0°42′10″E
- Country: France
- Region: Pays de la Loire
- Department: Sarthe
- Arrondissement: Mamers
- Canton: Saint-Calais
- Intercommunality: Vallées de la Braye et de l'Anille

Government
  - Mayor (2020–2026): Sergine Prieur
- Area^{1}: 30.6 km^{2} (11.8 sq mi)
- Population (2023): 516
  - Density: 16.9/km^{2} (43.7/sq mi)
- Demonym(s): Montabonais, Montabonaise
- Time zone: UTC+01:00 (CET)
  - Summer (DST): UTC+02:00 (CEST)
- INSEE/Postal code: 72204 /72120
- ^{1} French Land Register data, which excludes lakes, ponds, glaciers > 1 km^{2} (0.386 sq mi or 247 acres) and river estuaries.

Montaillé (French pronunciation: [mɔ̃taje]) is a commune in the Sarthe department in the region of Pays de la Loire in north-western France.

== See also ==
- Communes of the Sarthe department
