= Nauvay =

- Commune
- Location of Nauvay
- Location within France Location within Pays de la Loire
- Coordinates: 48°15′07″N 0°23′39″E
- Country: France
- Region: Pays de la Loire
- Department: Sarthe
- Arrondissement: Mamers
- Canton: Mamers
- Intercommunality: Maine Saosnois

Government
  - Mayor (2020–2026): Annick Leroi
- Area^{1}: 2.71 km^{2} (1.05 sq mi)
- Highest elevation: 87 m (285 ft)
- Lowest elevation: 64 m (210 ft)
- Population (2023): 12
  - Density: 4.4/km^{2} (11/sq mi)
- Time zone: UTC+01:00 (CET)
  - Summer (DST): UTC+02:00 (CEST)
- INSEE/Postal code: 72214 /72260
- ^{1} French Land Register data, which excludes lakes, ponds, glaciers > 1 km^{2} (0.386 sq mi or 247 acres) and river estuaries.

Nauvay (French pronunciation: [novɛ]) is a commune in the Sarthe department in the region of Pays de la Loire in north-western France.

== Population ==
Historical population
Year	Pop.	±% p.a.
1968	30	—
1975	19	−6.32%
1982	16	−2.43%
1990	15	−0.80%
1999	18	+2.05%
2007	19	+0.68%
2012	12	−8.78%
2017	11	−1.73%
2023	12	+1.46%
Source: INSEE

== See also ==
- Communes of the Sarthe department
