= Coudrecieux =

- Commune
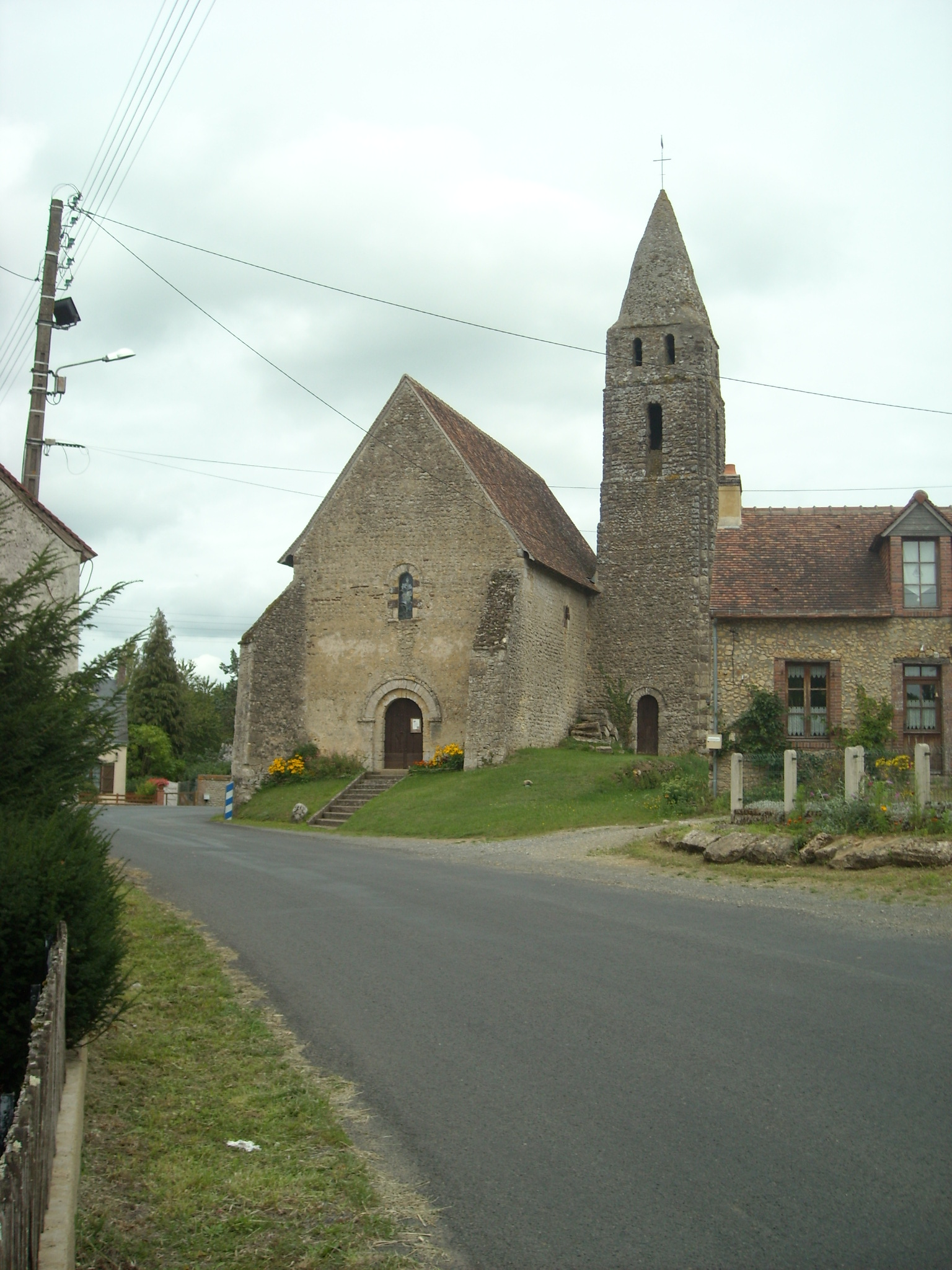
- The church of the hamlet of Loges
- Location of Coudrecieux
- Location within France Location within Pays de la Loire
- Coordinates: 47°59′36″N 0°37′51″E
- Country: France
- Region: Pays de la Loire
- Department: Sarthe
- Arrondissement: Mamers
- Canton: Saint-Calais
- Intercommunality: Le Gesnois Bilurien

Government
  - Mayor (2020–2026): Laurent Goupil
- Area^{1}: 24.27 km^{2} (9.37 sq mi)
- Highest elevation: 182 m (597 ft)
- Lowest elevation: 104 m (341 ft)
- Population (2023): 636
  - Density: 26.2/km^{2} (67.9/sq mi)
- Demonym(s): Coudrecelestin, Coudrecelestine
- Time zone: UTC+01:00 (CET)
  - Summer (DST): UTC+02:00 (CEST)
- INSEE/Postal code: 72094 /72440
- ^{1} French Land Register data, which excludes lakes, ponds, glaciers > 1 km^{2} (0.386 sq mi or 247 acres) and river estuaries.

Coudrecieux (French pronunciation: [kudʁəsjø]) is a commune in the Sarthe department in the Pays de la Loire region in north-western France.

== See also ==
- Communes of the Sarthe department
