= Courgenard =

- Commune
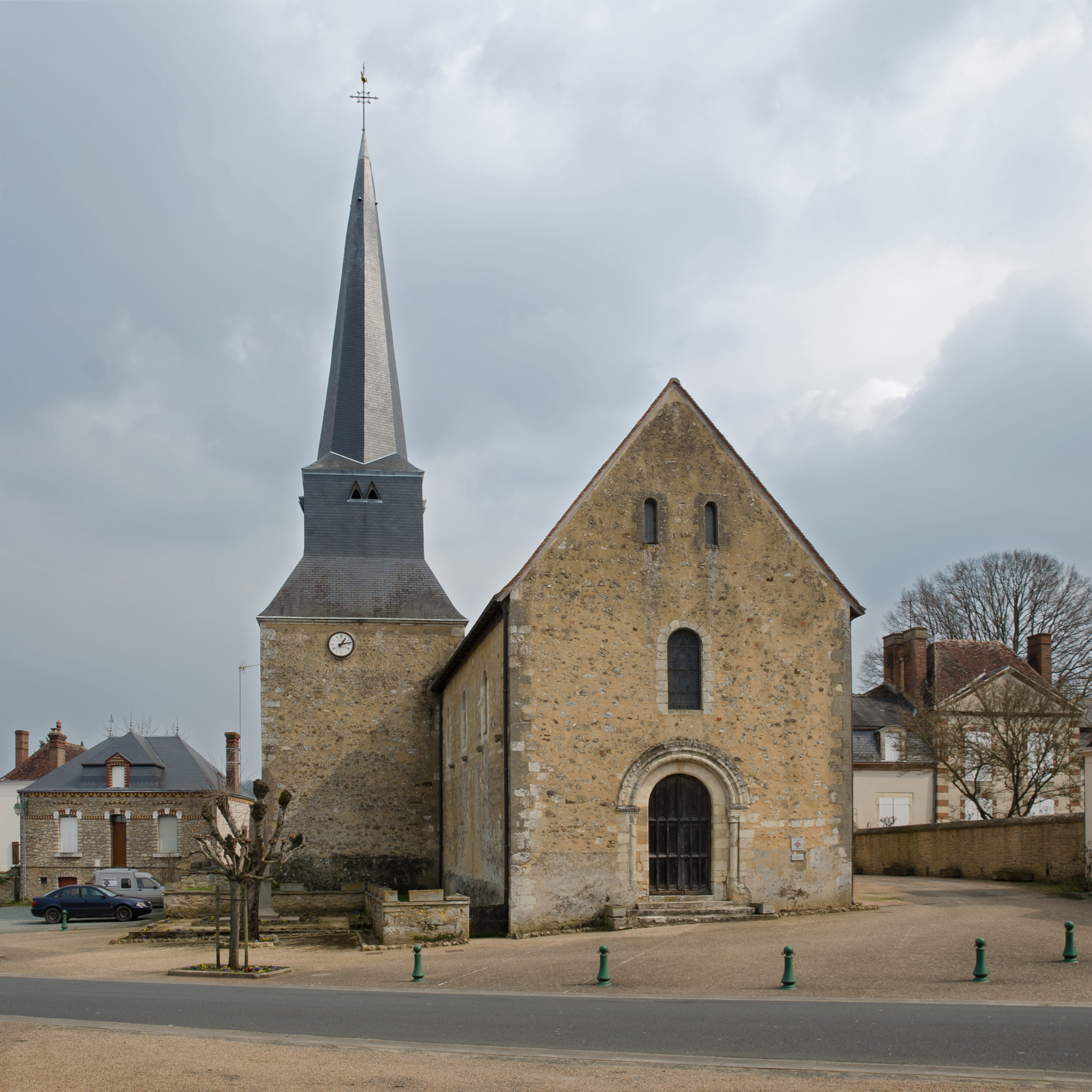
- The church of Saint Martin
- Location of Courgenard
- Location within France Location within Pays de la Loire
- Coordinates: 48°09′08″N 0°44′11″E
- Country: France
- Region: Pays de la Loire
- Department: Sarthe
- Arrondissement: Mamers
- Canton: Saint-Calais
- Intercommunality: CC du Perche Emeraude

Government
  - Mayor (2020–2026): Thierry Renvoizé
- Area^{1}: 11.32 km^{2} (4.37 sq mi)
- Population (2023): 454
  - Density: 40.1/km^{2} (104/sq mi)
- Demonym(s): Cosnellien, Cosnellienne
- Time zone: UTC+01:00 (CET)
  - Summer (DST): UTC+02:00 (CEST)
- INSEE/Postal code: 72105 /72320
- ^{1} French Land Register data, which excludes lakes, ponds, glaciers > 1 km^{2} (0.386 sq mi or 247 acres) and river estuaries.

Courgenard is a commune in the Sarthe department in the Pays de la Loire region in north-western France.

== See also ==
- Communes of the Sarthe department
