= Saint-Ulphace =

- Commune
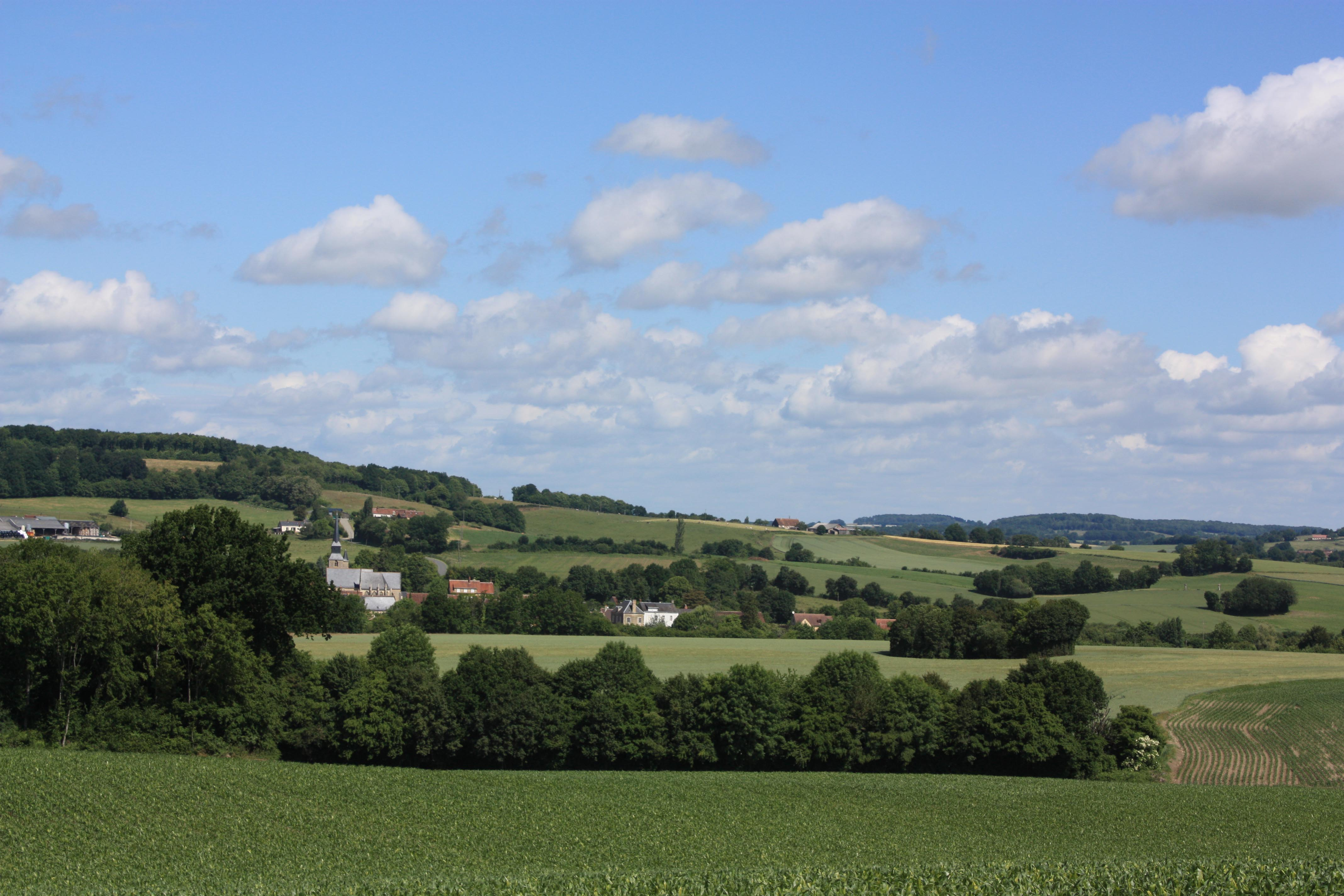
- A general view of Saint-Ulphace
- Location of Saint-Ulphace
- Location within France Location within Pays de la Loire
- Coordinates: 48°09′29″N 0°49′03″E
- Country: France
- Region: Pays de la Loire
- Department: Sarthe
- Arrondissement: Mamers
- Canton: Saint-Calais
- Intercommunality: CC du Perche Emeraude

Government
  - Mayor (2020–2026): Thierry Guerin
- Area^{1}: 15.98 km^{2} (6.17 sq mi)
- Highest elevation: 251 m (823 ft)
- Lowest elevation: 143 m (469 ft)
- Population (2023): 222
  - Density: 13.9/km^{2} (36.0/sq mi)
- Time zone: UTC+01:00 (CET)
  - Summer (DST): UTC+02:00 (CEST)
- INSEE/Postal code: 72322 /72320
- ^{1} French Land Register data, which excludes lakes, ponds, glaciers > 1 km^{2} (0.386 sq mi or 247 acres) and river estuaries.

Saint-Ulphace (French pronunciation: [sɛ̃.t‿ylfas]) is a commune in the Sarthe department in the region of Pays de la Loire in north-western France.

== See also ==
- Communes of the Sarthe department
