= Tresson =

- Commune
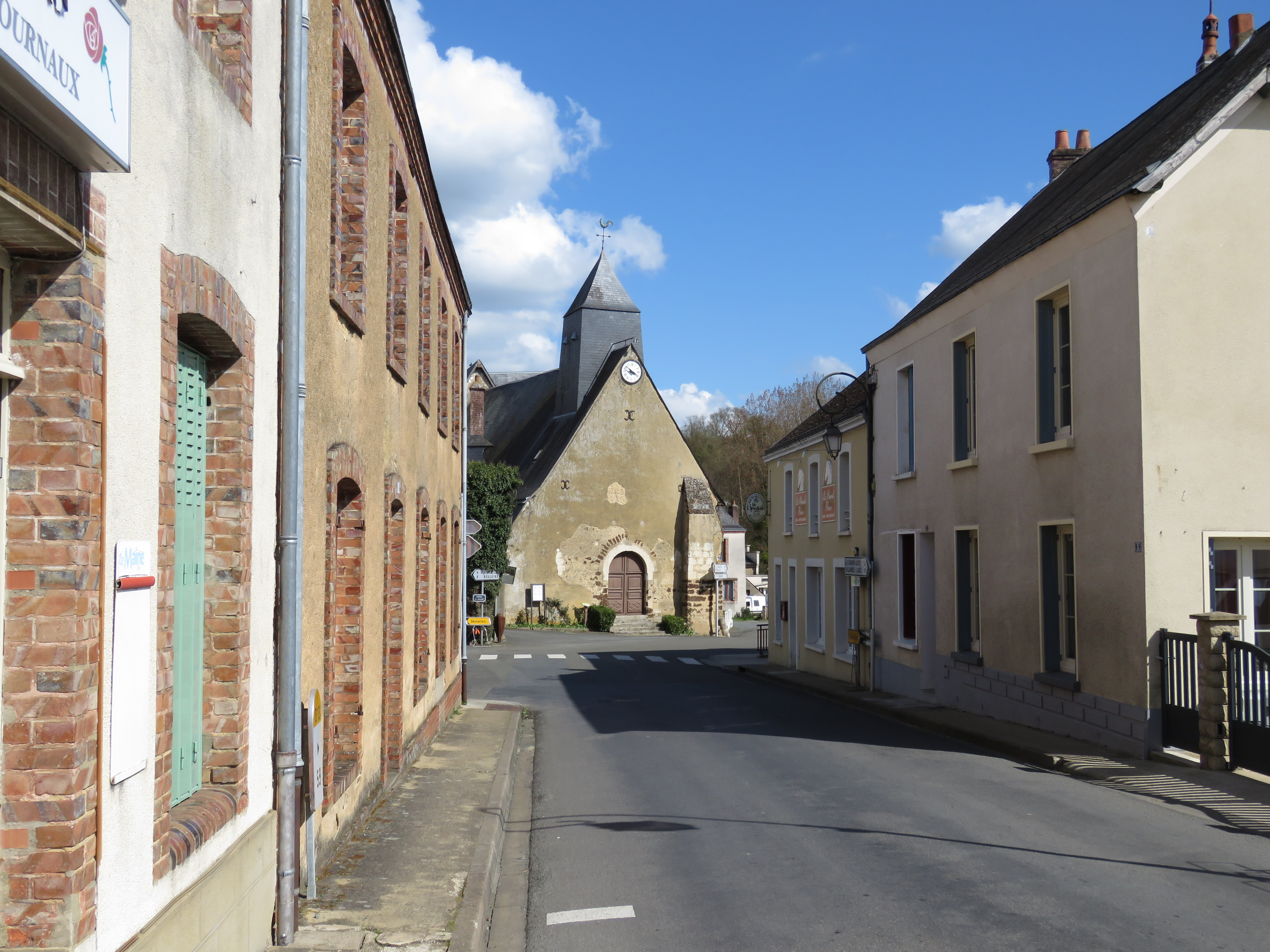
- The church of Saint-Martin seen from the rue des Rosiers
- Location of Tresson
- Location within France Location within Pays de la Loire
- Coordinates: 47°54′10″N 0°34′24″E
- Country: France
- Region: Pays de la Loire
- Department: Sarthe
- Arrondissement: Mamers
- Canton: Saint-Calais
- Intercommunality: Le Gesnois Bilurien

Government
  - Mayor (2020–2026): Chantal Buin
- Area^{1}: 29.6 km^{2} (11.4 sq mi)
- Population (2023): 511
  - Density: 17.3/km^{2} (44.7/sq mi)
- Time zone: UTC+01:00 (CET)
  - Summer (DST): UTC+02:00 (CEST)
- INSEE/Postal code: 72361 /72440
- ^{1} French Land Register data, which excludes lakes, ponds, glaciers > 1 km^{2} (0.386 sq mi or 247 acres) and river estuaries.

Tresson is a commune in the Sarthe department in the region of Pays de la Loire in north-western France.

== See also ==
- Communes of the Sarthe department
