= Gréez-sur-Roc =

- Commune
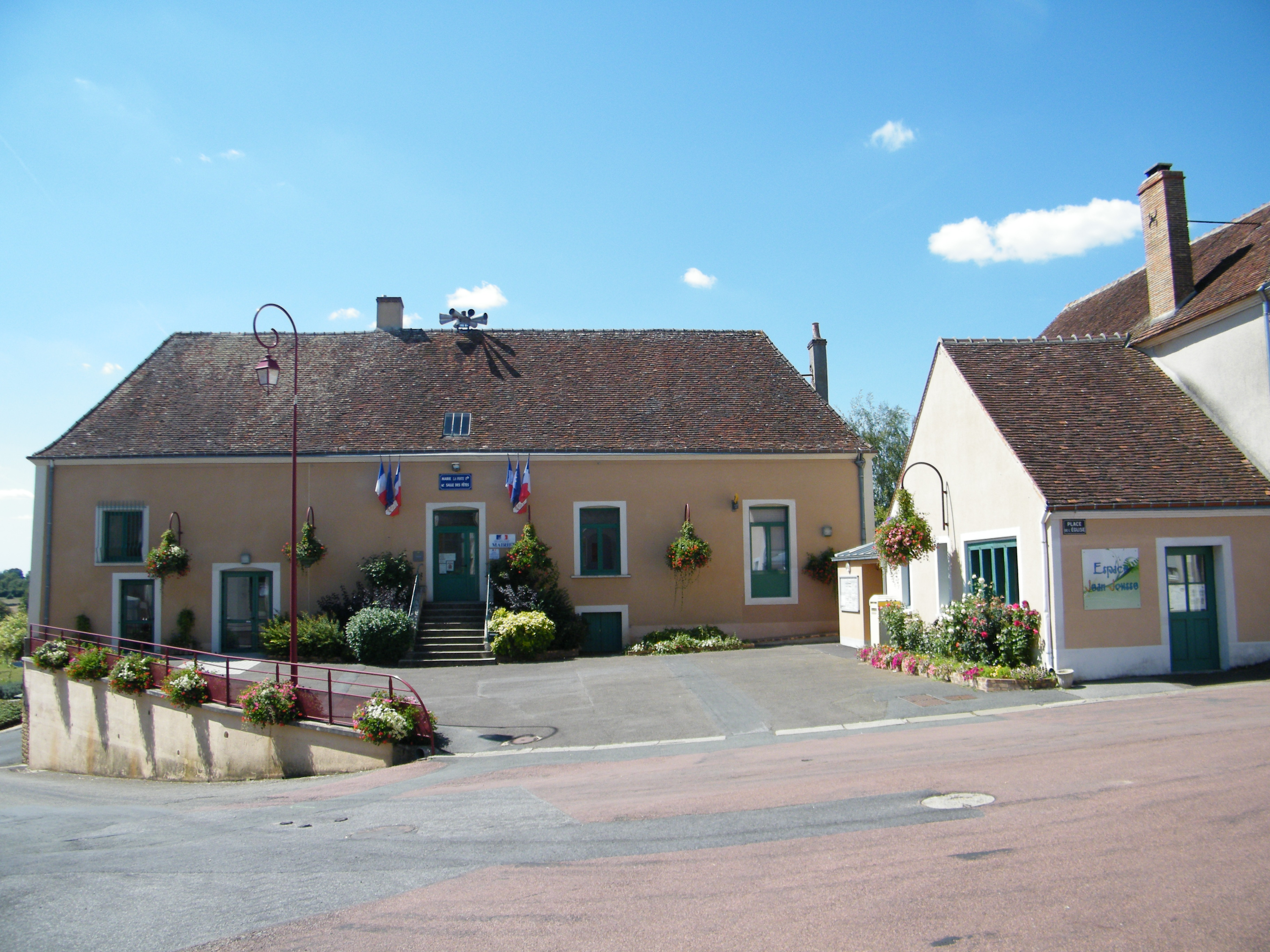
- The town hall in Gréez-sur-Roc
- Location of Gréez-sur-Roc
- Location within France Location within Pays de la Loire
- Coordinates: 48°08′16″N 0°47′41″E
- Country: France
- Region: Pays de la Loire
- Department: Sarthe
- Arrondissement: Mamers
- Canton: Saint-Calais
- Intercommunality: CC du Perche Emeraude

Government
  - Mayor (2020–2026): Myriam Morand
- Area^{1}: 25.38 km^{2} (9.80 sq mi)
- Highest elevation: 160 m (520 ft)
- Lowest elevation: 251 m (823 ft)
- Population (2023): 344
  - Density: 13.6/km^{2} (35.1/sq mi)
- Time zone: UTC+01:00 (CET)
  - Summer (DST): UTC+02:00 (CEST)
- INSEE/Postal code: 72144 /72320
- ^{1} French Land Register data, which excludes lakes, ponds, glaciers > 1 km^{2} (0.386 sq mi or 247 acres) and river estuaries.

Gréez-sur-Roc is a commune in the Sarthe department in the region of Pays de la Loire in north-western France.

== See also ==
- Communes of the Sarthe department
