= Vancé =

- Commune
- Location of Vancé
- Location within France Location within Pays de la Loire
- Coordinates: 47°50′00″N 0°38′50″E
- Country: France
- Region: Pays de la Loire
- Department: Sarthe
- Arrondissement: Mamers
- Canton: Saint-Calais
- Intercommunality: Vallées de la Braye et de l'Anille

Government
  - Mayor (2020–2026): Hubert Paris
- Area^{1}: 12 km^{2} (4.6 sq mi)
- Highest elevation: 77 m (253 ft)
- Lowest elevation: 156 m (512 ft)
- Population (2023): 283
  - Density: 24/km^{2} (61/sq mi)
- Demonym(s): Vancéen, Vancéenne
- Time zone: UTC+01:00 (CET)
  - Summer (DST): UTC+02:00 (CEST)
- INSEE/Postal code: 72368 /72310
- ^{1} French Land Register data, which excludes lakes, ponds, glaciers > 1 km^{2} (0.386 sq mi or 247 acres) and river estuaries.

Vancé (French pronunciation: [vɑ̃se]) is a commune in the Sarthe department in the region of Pays de la Loire in north-western France.

== See also ==
- Communes of the Sarthe department
