= Saint-Jean-des-Échelles =

- Commune
- Location of Saint-Jean-des-Échelles
- Location within France Location within Pays de la Loire
- Coordinates: 48°07′47″N 0°42′47″E
- Country: France
- Region: Pays de la Loire
- Department: Sarthe
- Arrondissement: Mamers
- Canton: Saint-Calais
- Intercommunality: CC du Perche Emeraude

Government
  - Mayor (2020–2026): Yves Goullier
- Area^{1}: 10.64 km^{2} (4.11 sq mi)
- Highest elevation: 200 m (660 ft)
- Lowest elevation: 104 m (341 ft)
- Population (2023): 222
  - Density: 20.9/km^{2} (54.0/sq mi)
- Time zone: UTC+01:00 (CET)
  - Summer (DST): UTC+02:00 (CEST)
- INSEE/Postal code: 72292 /72320
- ^{1} French Land Register data, which excludes lakes, ponds, glaciers > 1 km^{2} (0.386 sq mi or 247 acres) and river estuaries.

Saint-Jean-des-Échelles (French pronunciation: [sɛ̃ ʒɑ̃ de.z‿eʃɛl]) is a commune in the Sarthe department in the region of Pays de la Loire in north-western France.

There are two notable buildings in Saint-Jean-des-Échelles. The parish church of Saint-Jean-Baptiste dates from the 12th century. It contains ten bas-reliefs from the 16th century, and three altars and altarpieces from the 18th century. The whole is listed as a historical monument. Secondly, Courtangis Castle forms part of the locality.

== Gallery ==
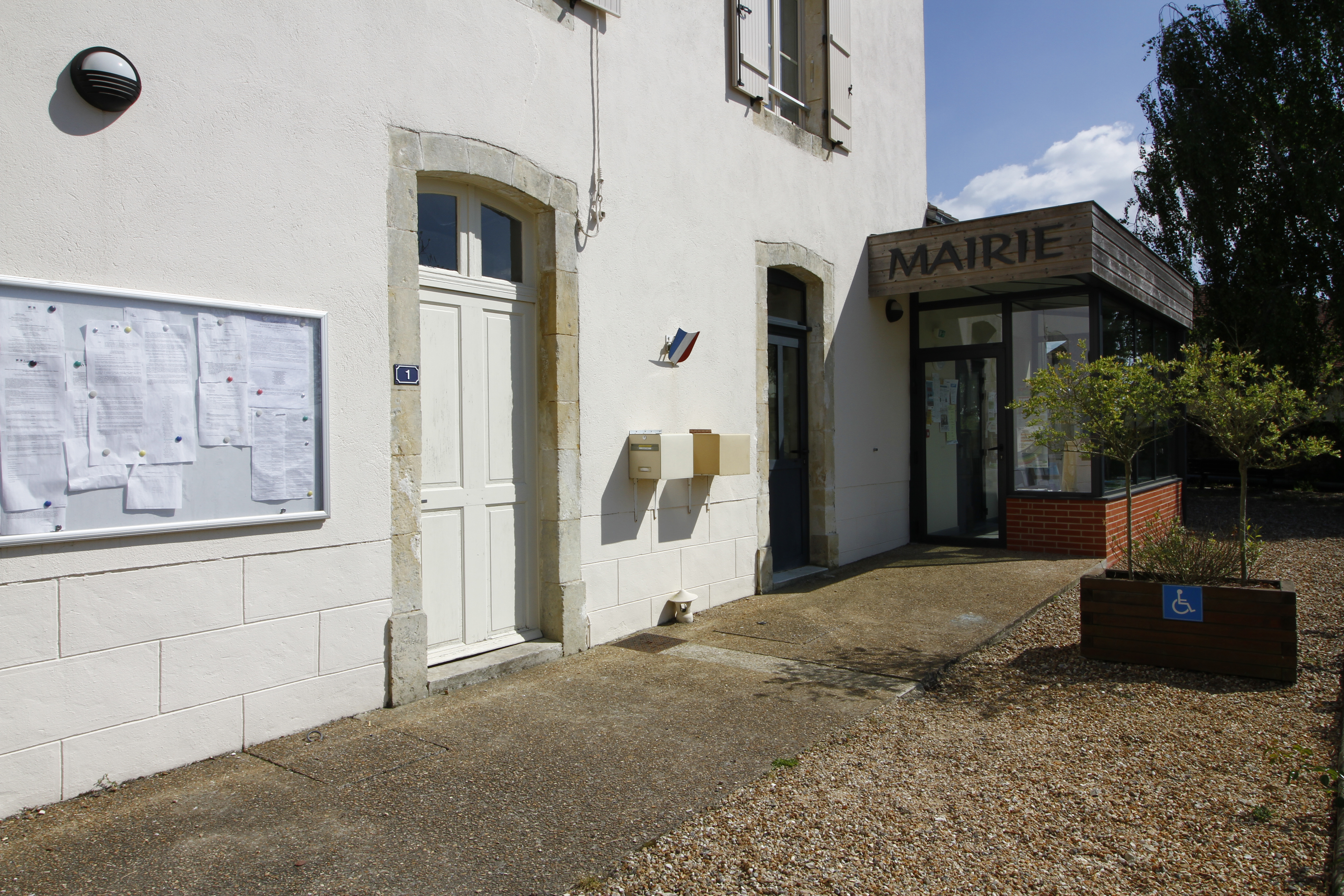
The townhall.

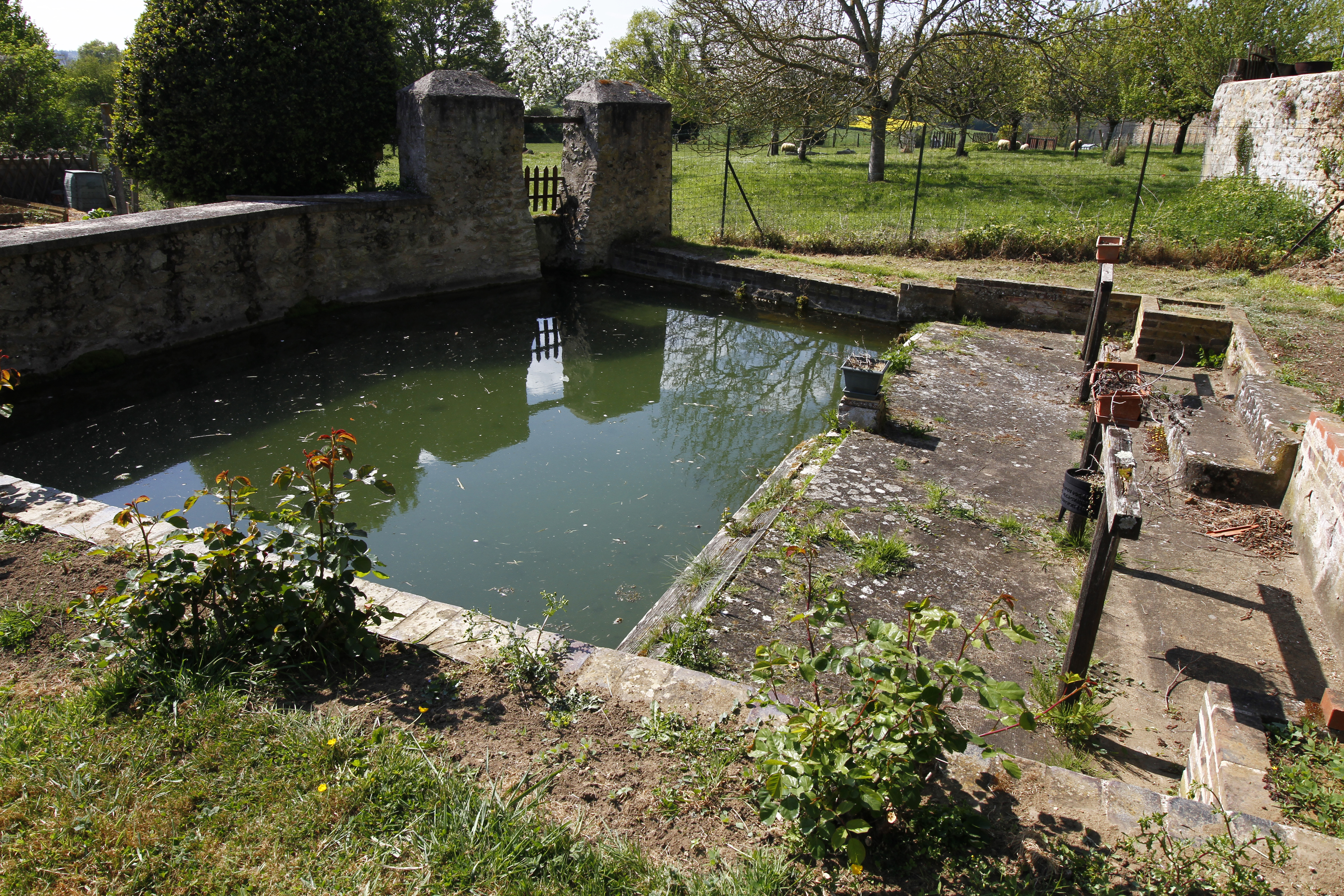
Unusual communal Lavoir or clothes washing place.

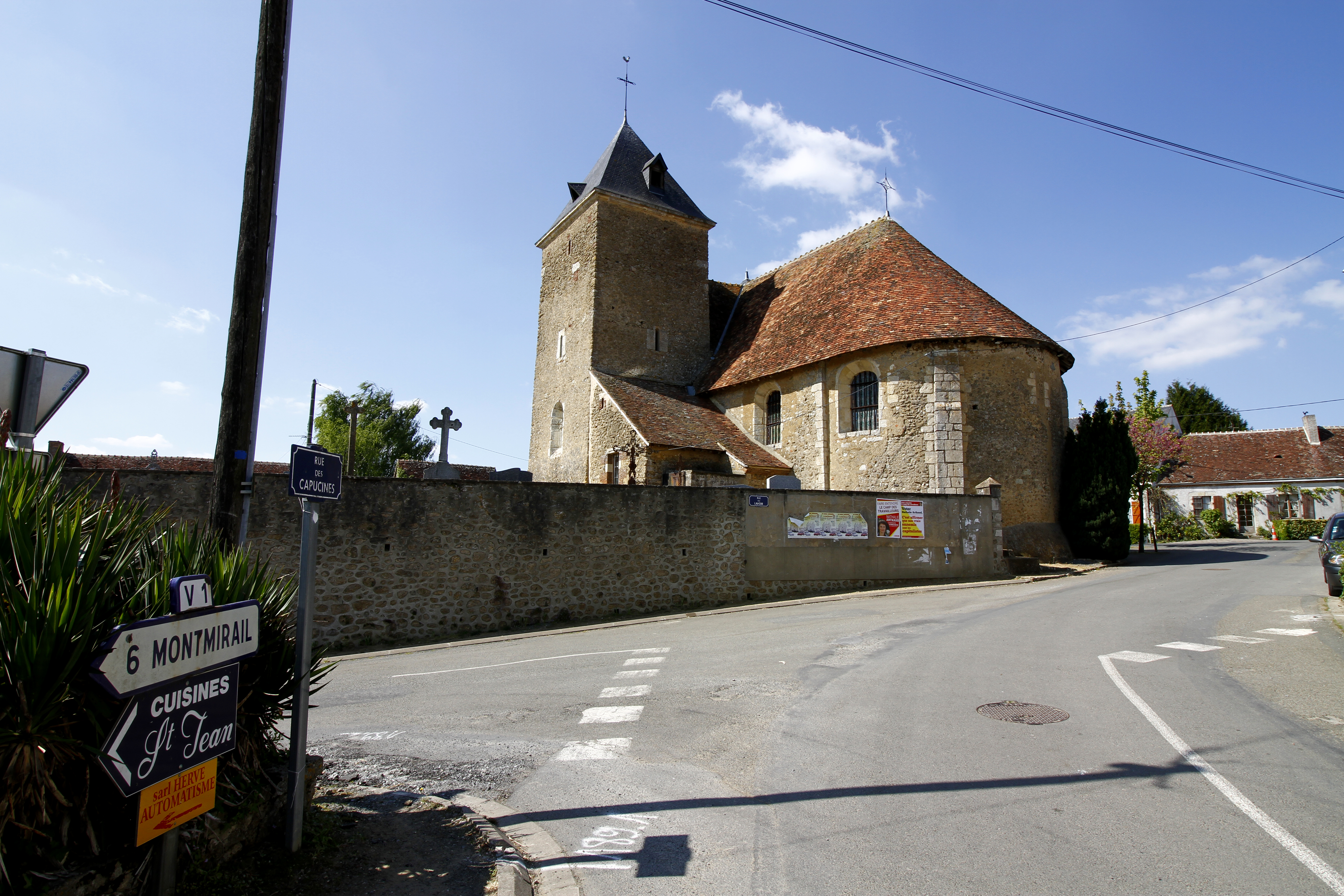
Parish church with rounded body and square tower

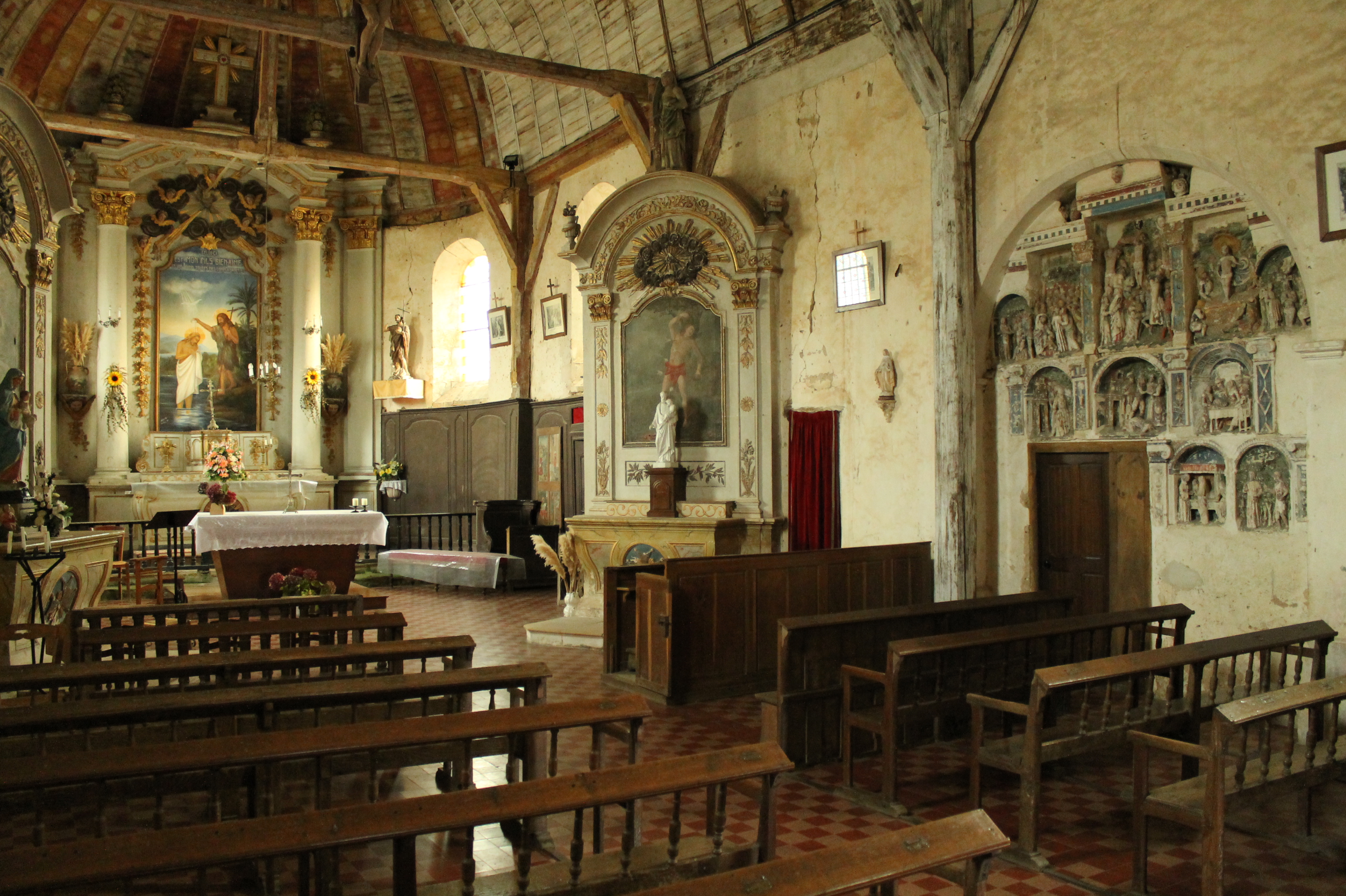
Interior of parish church

== See also ==
- Communes of the Sarthe department
