= Valennes =

- Commune
- Location of Valennes
- Location within France Location within Pays de la Loire
- Coordinates: 47°59′46″N 0°48′34″E
- Country: France
- Region: Pays de la Loire
- Department: Sarthe
- Arrondissement: Mamers
- Canton: Saint-Calais
- Intercommunality: Vallées de la Braye et de l'Anille

Government
  - Mayor (2020–2026): Nadine Mercier
- Area^{1}: 26.7 km^{2} (10.3 sq mi)
- Highest elevation: 174 m (571 ft)
- Lowest elevation: 95 m (312 ft)
- Population (2023): 303
  - Density: 11.3/km^{2} (29.4/sq mi)
- Demonym(s): Valennois, Valennoise
- Time zone: UTC+01:00 (CET)
  - Summer (DST): UTC+02:00 (CEST)
- INSEE/Postal code: 72366 /72320
- ^{1} French Land Register data, which excludes lakes, ponds, glaciers > 1 km^{2} (0.386 sq mi or 247 acres) and river estuaries.

Valennes (French pronunciation: [valɛn]) is a commune in the Sarthe department in the region of Pays de la Loire in north-western France.

== See also ==
- Communes of the Sarthe department
