= Communes of the Sarthe department =

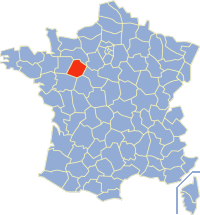

The following is a list of the 352 communes of the Sarthe department of France.

The communes cooperate in the following intercommunalities (as of 2025):

- CU Le Mans Métropole
- Communauté urbaine d'Alençon (partly)
- Communauté de communes de la Champagne Conlinoise et du Pays de Sillé
- Communauté de communes Le Gesnois Bilurien
- Communauté de communes Haute Sarthe Alpes Mancelles
- Communauté de communes Loir-Lucé-Bercé
- Communauté de communes Loué-Brûlon-Noyen
- Communauté de communes Maine Cœur de Sarthe
- Communauté de communes Maine Saosnois (partly)
- Communauté de communes d'Orée de Bercé - Bélinois
- Communauté de communes du Pays Fléchois
- Communauté de communes du Pays Sabolien (partly)
- Communauté de communes du Perche Emeraude
- Communauté de communes du Sud Est Manceau
- Communauté de communes Sud Sarthe
- Communauté de communes du Val de Sarthe
- Communauté de communes des Vallées de la Braye et de l'Anille

INSEE code	Postal code	Commune
72001	72650	Aigné
72002	72600	Aillières-Beauvoir
72003	72700	Allonnes
72004	72540	Amné
72005	72610	Ancinnes
72006	72610	Arçonnay
72007	72370	Ardenay-sur-Mérize
72008	72230	Arnage
72009	72270	Arthezé
72010	72430	Asnières-sur-Vègre
72011	72130	Assé-le-Boisne
72012	72170	Assé-le-Riboul
72013	72800	Aubigné-Racan
72015	72600	Les Aulneaux
72016	72300	Auvers-le-Hamon
72017	72540	Auvers-sous-Montfaucon
72018	72260	Avesnes-en-Saosnois
72019	72350	Avessé
72020	72400	Avezé
72021	72430	Avoise
72022	72200	Le Bailleul
72023	72290	Ballon-Saint-Mars
72024	72650	La Bazoge
72025	72200	Bazouges Cré sur Loir
72026	72110	Beaufay
72028	72500	Beaumont-Pied-de-Bœuf
72027	72340	Beaumont-sur-Dême
72029	72170	Beaumont-sur-Sarthe
72031	72160	Beillé
72032	72320	Berfay
72219	72240	Bernay-Neuvy-en-Champagne
72034	72610	Bérus
72035	72310	Bessé-sur-Braye
72036	72610	Béthon
72037	72600	Blèves
72038	72400	Boëssé-le-Sec
72039	72110	Bonnétable
72040	72400	La Bosse
72041	72390	Bouër
72042	72440	Bouloire
72043	72610	Bourg-le-Roi
72044	72270	Bousse
72045	72550	Brains-sur-Gée
72046	72370	Le Breil-sur-Mérize
72047	72250	Brette-les-Pins
72048	72110	Briosne-lès-Sables
72049	72500	La Bruère-sur-Loir
72050	72350	Brûlon
72051	72330	Cérans-Foulletourte
72052	72340	Chahaignes
72053	72250	Challes
72054	72470	Champagné
72056	72610	Champfleur
72057	72320	Champrond
72058	72560	Changé
72059	72430	Chantenay-Villedieu
72060	72800	La Chapelle-aux-Choux
72061	72300	La Chapelle-d'Aligné
72062	72400	La Chapelle-du-Bois
72064	72310	La Chapelle-Huon
72065	72650	La Chapelle-Saint-Aubin
72066	72240	La Chapelle-Saint-Fray
72067	72160	La Chapelle-Saint-Rémy
72068	72340	La Chartre-sur-le-Loir
72070	72540	Chassillé
72072	72510	Château-l'Hermitage
72073	72550	Chaufour-Notre-Dame
72074	72540	Chemiré-en-Charnie
72075	72210	Chemiré-le-Gaudin
72076	72610	Chenay
72077	72500	Chenu
72078	72170	Chérancé
72079	72610	Chérisay
72080	72400	Cherré-Au
72083	72350	Chevillé
72084	72200	Clermont-Créans
72085	72310	Cogners
72086	72600	Commerveil
72087	72120	Conflans-sur-Anille
72088	72290	Congé-sur-Orne
72089	72240	Conlie
72090	72160	Connerré
72091	72600	Contilly
72093	72400	Cormes
72094	72440	Coudrecieux
72095	72190	Coulaines
72096	72550	Coulans-sur-Gée
72098	72800	Coulongé
72099	72290	Courcebœufs
72100	72270	Courcelles-la-Forêt
72101	72110	Courcemont
72102	72110	Courcival
72103	72150	Courdemanche
72104	72260	Courgains
72105	72320	Courgenard
72106	72300	Courtillers
72107	72540	Crannes-en-Champagne
72109	72140	Crissé
72110	72200	Crosmières
72111	72240	Cures
72112	72260	Dangeul
72113	72550	Degré
72114	72400	Dehault
72115	72500	Dissay-sous-Courcillon
72118	72390	Dollon
72119	72240	Domfront-en-Champagne
72120	72170	Doucelles
72121	72590	Douillet
72122	72160	Duneau
72123	72270	Dureil
72124	72220	Écommoy
72125	72120	Écorpain
72126	72540	Épineu-le-Chevreuil
72127	72700	Étival-lès-le-Mans
72129	72470	Fatines
72130	72550	Fay
72131	72430	Fercé-sur-Sarthe
72132	72400	La Ferté-Bernard
72133	72210	Fillé
72154	72200	La Flèche
72134	72500	Flée
72135	72330	La Fontaine-Saint-Martin
72136	72350	Fontenay-sur-Vègre
72138	72130	Fresnay-sur-Sarthe
72139	72610	Fyé
72141	72130	Gesnes-le-Gandelin
72142	72610	Grandchamp
72143	72150	Le Grand-Lucé
72144	72320	Gréez-sur-Roc
72145	72140	Le Grez
72146	72230	Guécélard
72147	72380	La Guierche
72148	72110	Jauzé
72149	72540	Joué-en-Charnie
72150	72380	Joué-l'Abbé
72151	72300	Juigné-sur-Sarthe
72152	72170	Juillé
72153	72500	Jupilles
72155	72220	Laigné-Saint-Gervais
72156	72320	Lamnay
72157	72240	Lavardin
72158	72390	Lavaré
72160	72500	Lavernat
72161	72340	Lhomme
72163	72270	Ligron
72164	72610	Livet-en-Saosnois
72262	72340	Loir en Vallée
72165	72450	Lombron
72166	72540	Longnes
72167	72300	Louailles
72168	72540	Loué
72169	72210	Louplande
72170	72600	Louvigny
72171	72600	Louzes
72172	72390	Le Luart
72173	72500	Luceau
72174	72290	Lucé-sous-Ballon
72175	72800	Luché-Pringé
72176	72800	Le Lude
72177	72210	Maigné
72178	72440	Maisoncelles
72179	72270	Malicorne-sur-Sarthe
72180	72600	Mamers
72181	72000	Le Mans
72182	72510	Mansigné
72183	72340	Marçon
72184	72540	Mareil-en-Champagne
72185	72200	Mareil-sur-Loir
72186	72170	Maresché
72187	72220	Marigné-Laillé
72189	72260	Marolles-les-Braults
72190	72120	Marolles-lès-Saint-Calais
72188	72600	Marollette
72191	72360	Mayet
72192	72260	Les Mées
72193	72320	Melleray

INSEE code	Postal code	Commune
72194	72170	Meurcé
72195	72270	Mézeray
72197	72240	Mézières-sous-Lavardin
72196	72290	Mézières-sur-Ponthouin
72198	72650	La Milesse
72199	72170	Moitron-sur-Sarthe
72200	72230	Moncé-en-Belin
72201	72260	Moncé-en-Saosnois
72202	72260	Monhoudou
72204	72120	Montaillé
72205	72380	Montbizot
72241	72450	Montfort-le-Gesnois
72208	72320	Montmirail
72209	72130	Montreuil-le-Chétif
72210	72150	Montreuil-le-Henri
72211	72140	Mont-Saint-Jean
72071	72500	Montval-sur-Loir
72212	72130	Moulins-le-Carbonnel
72213	72230	Mulsanne
72214	72260	Nauvay
72215	72600	Neufchâtel-en-Saosnois
72216	72240	Neuvillalais
72217	72190	Neuville-sur-Sarthe
72218	72140	Neuvillette-en-Charnie
72220	72110	Nogent-le-Bernard
72221	72500	Nogent-sur-Loir
72232	72300	Notre-Dame-du-Pé
72222	72260	Nouans
72223	72430	Noyen-sur-Sarthe
72224	72370	Nuillé-le-Jalais
72225	72610	Oisseau-le-Petit
72226	72330	Oizé
72227	72600	Panon
72228	72300	Parcé-sur-Sarthe
72229	72140	Parennes
72230	72330	Parigné-le-Pôlin
72231	72250	Parigné-l'Évêque
72233	72260	Peray
72234	72140	Pezé-le-Robert
72235	72170	Piacé
72236	72300	Pincé
72237	72430	Pirmil
72238	72600	Pizieux
72239	72350	Poillé-sur-Vègre
72243	72510	Pontvallain
72244	72300	Précigné
72245	72400	Préval
72246	72110	Prévelles
72247	72700	Pruillé-le-Chétif
72248	72150	Pruillé-l'Éguillé
72249	72550	La Quinte
72250	72120	Rahay
72251	72260	René
72252	72510	Requeil
72253	72210	Roëzé-sur-Sarthe
72254	72610	Rouessé-Fontaine
72255	72140	Rouessé-Vassé
72256	72140	Rouez
72257	72700	Rouillon
72259	72110	Rouperroux-le-Coquet
72260	72230	Ruaudin
72261	72240	Ruillé-en-Champagne
72264	72300	Sablé-sur-Sarthe
72265	72110	Saint-Aignan
72266	72130	Saint-Aubin-de-Locquenay
72267	72400	Saint-Aubin-des-Coudrais
72268	72220	Saint-Biez-en-Belin
72269	72120	Saint-Calais
72270	72600	Saint-Calez-en-Saosnois
72271	72110	Saint-Célerin
72273	72170	Saint-Christophe-du-Jambet
72274	72540	Saint-Christophe-en-Champagne
72275	72460	Saint-Corneille
72276	72110	Saint-Cosme-en-Vairais
72277	72110	Saint-Denis-des-Coudrais
72278	72350	Saint-Denis-d'Orques
72272	72120	Sainte-Cérotte
72289	72380	Sainte-Jamme-sur-Sarthe
72319	72380	Sainte-Sabine-sur-Longève
72279	72150	Saint-Georges-de-la-Couée
72280	72700	Saint-Georges-du-Bois
72281	72110	Saint-Georges-du-Rosay
72282	72590	Saint-Georges-le-Gaultier
72283	72800	Saint-Germain-d'Arcé
72286	72120	Saint-Gervais-de-Vic
72290	72380	Saint-Jean-d'Assé
72291	72510	Saint-Jean-de-la-Motte
72292	72320	Saint-Jean-des-Échelles
72293	72430	Saint-Jean-du-Bois
72294	72590	Saint-Léonard-des-Bois
72295	72600	Saint-Longis
72296	72320	Saint-Maixent
72297	72170	Saint-Marceau
72299	72220	Saint-Mars-d'Outillé
72300	72470	Saint-Mars-la-Brière
72302	72400	Saint-Martin-des-Monts
72303	72440	Saint-Michel-de-Chavaignes
72305	72130	Saint-Ouen-de-Mimbré
72306	72220	Saint-Ouen-en-Belin
72307	72350	Saint-Ouen-en-Champagne
72308	72610	Saint Paterne - Le Chevain
72309	72590	Saint-Paul-le-Gaultier
72310	72190	Saint-Pavace
72311	72500	Saint-Pierre-de-Chevillé
72312	72430	Saint-Pierre-des-Bois
72313	72600	Saint-Pierre-des-Ormes
72314	72150	Saint-Pierre-du-Lorouër
72315	72140	Saint-Rémy-de-Sillé
72316	72600	Saint-Rémy-des-Monts
72317	72600	Saint-Rémy-du-Val
72320	72650	Saint-Saturnin
72321	72240	Saint-Symphorien
72322	72320	Saint-Ulphace
72323	72130	Saint-Victeur
72324	72600	Saint-Vincent-des-Prés
72325	72150	Saint-Vincent-du-Lorouër
72326	72600	Saosnes
72327	72360	Sarcé
72328	72190	Sargé-lès-le-Mans
72329	72460	Savigné-l'Évêque
72330	72800	Savigné-sous-le-Lude
72331	72160	Sceaux-sur-Huisne
72332	72170	Ségrie
72333	72390	Semur-en-Vallon
72334	72140	Sillé-le-Guillaume
72335	72460	Sillé-le-Philippe
72336	72300	Solesmes
72337	72130	Sougé-le-Ganelon
72338	72380	Souillé
72339	72210	Souligné-Flacé
72340	72290	Souligné-sous-Ballon
72341	72370	Soulitré
72342	72400	Souvigné-sur-Même
72343	72300	Souvigné-sur-Sarthe
72344	72700	Spay
72345	72370	Surfonds
72346	72210	La Suze-sur-Sarthe
72347	72430	Tassé
72348	72540	Tassillé
72349	72290	Teillé
72350	72220	Teloché
72351	72240	Tennie
72352	72110	Terrehault
72353	72320	Théligny
72354	72260	Thoigné
72355	72610	Thoiré-sous-Contensor
72356	72500	Thoiré-sur-Dinan
72357	72800	Thorée-les-Pins
72358	72160	Thorigné-sur-Dué
72359	72110	Torcé-en-Vallée
72360	72650	Trangé
72361	72440	Tresson
72362	72170	Le Tronchet
72363	72160	Tuffé-Val-de-la-Chéronne
72364	72500	Vaas
72382	72440	Val-de-la-Hune
72128	72120	Val-d'Étangson
72366	72320	Valennes
72367	72540	Vallon-sur-Gée
72368	72310	Vancé
72369	72360	Verneil-le-Chétif
72370	72170	Vernie
72372	72600	Vezot
72373	72320	Vibraye
72374	72600	Villaines-la-Carelle
72375	72400	Villaines-la-Gonais
72376	72150	Villaines-sous-Lucé
72377	72270	Villaines-sous-Malicorne
72137	72600, 72610	Villeneuve-en-Perseigne
72378	72300	Vion
72379	72350	Viré-en-Champagne
72380	72170	Vivoin
72381	72210	Voivres-lès-le-Mans
72383	72160	Vouvray-sur-Huisne
72385	72330	Yvré-le-Pôlin
72386	72530	Yvré-l'Évêque
