= Lamnay =

- Commune
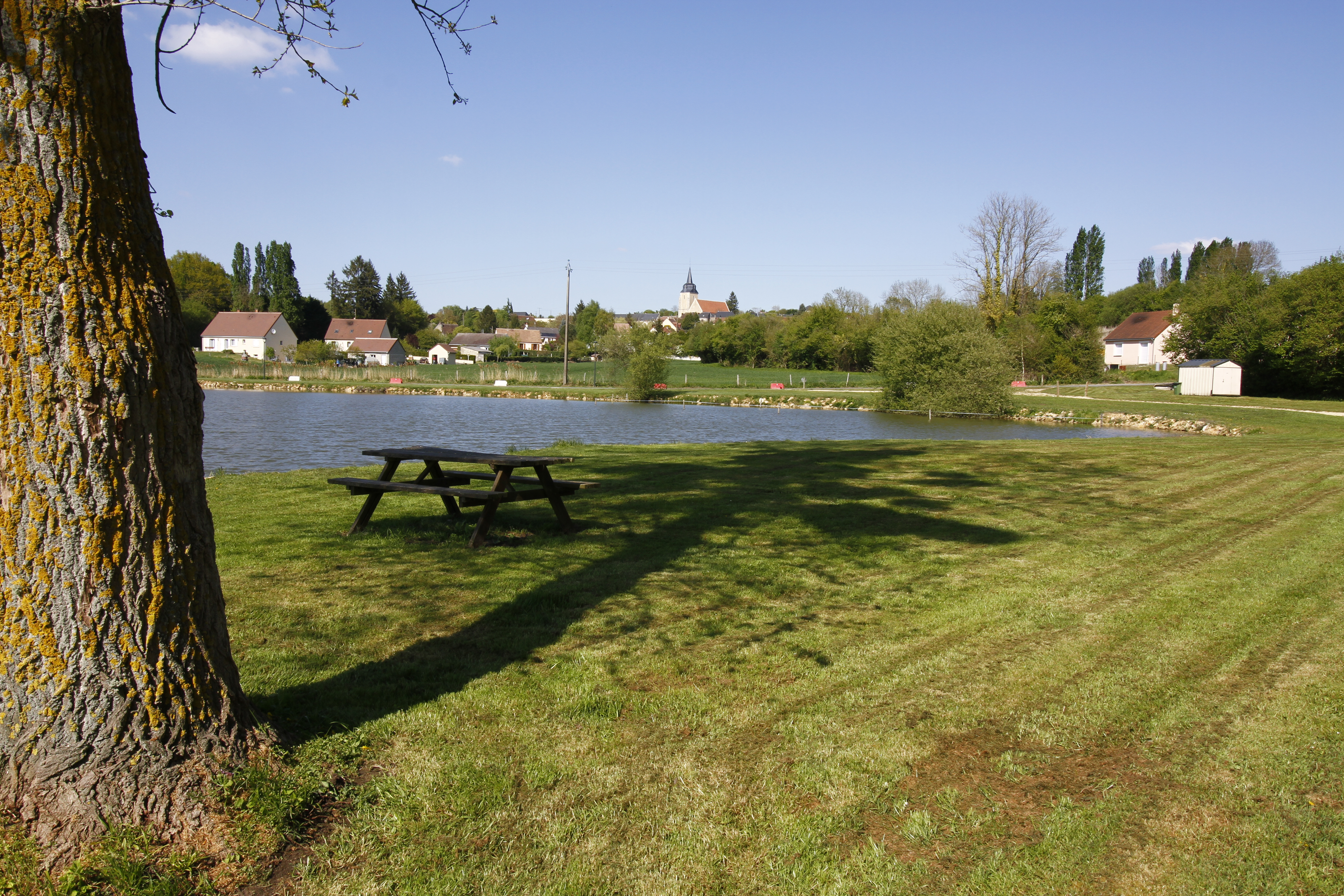
- The Gué Fraimbault pond in Lamnay
- Location of Lamnay
- Location within France Location within Pays de la Loire
- Coordinates: 48°07′00″N 0°42′18″E
- Country: France
- Region: Pays de la Loire
- Department: Sarthe
- Arrondissement: Mamers
- Canton: Saint-Calais
- Intercommunality: CC du Perche Emeraude

Government
  - Mayor (2020–2026): Nadège Pioger
- Area^{1}: 22.09 km^{2} (8.53 sq mi)
- Highest elevation: 182 m (597 ft)
- Lowest elevation: 87 m (285 ft)
- Population (2023): 928
  - Density: 42.0/km^{2} (109/sq mi)
- Time zone: UTC+01:00 (CET)
  - Summer (DST): UTC+02:00 (CEST)
- INSEE/Postal code: 72156 /72320
- ^{1} French Land Register data, which excludes lakes, ponds, glaciers > 1 km^{2} (0.386 sq mi or 247 acres) and river estuaries.

Lamnay (French pronunciation: [lɑ̃nɛ]) is a commune in the Sarthe department, region of Pays de la Loire, northwestern France.

== See also ==
- Communes of the Sarthe department
