= Dollon =

- Commune
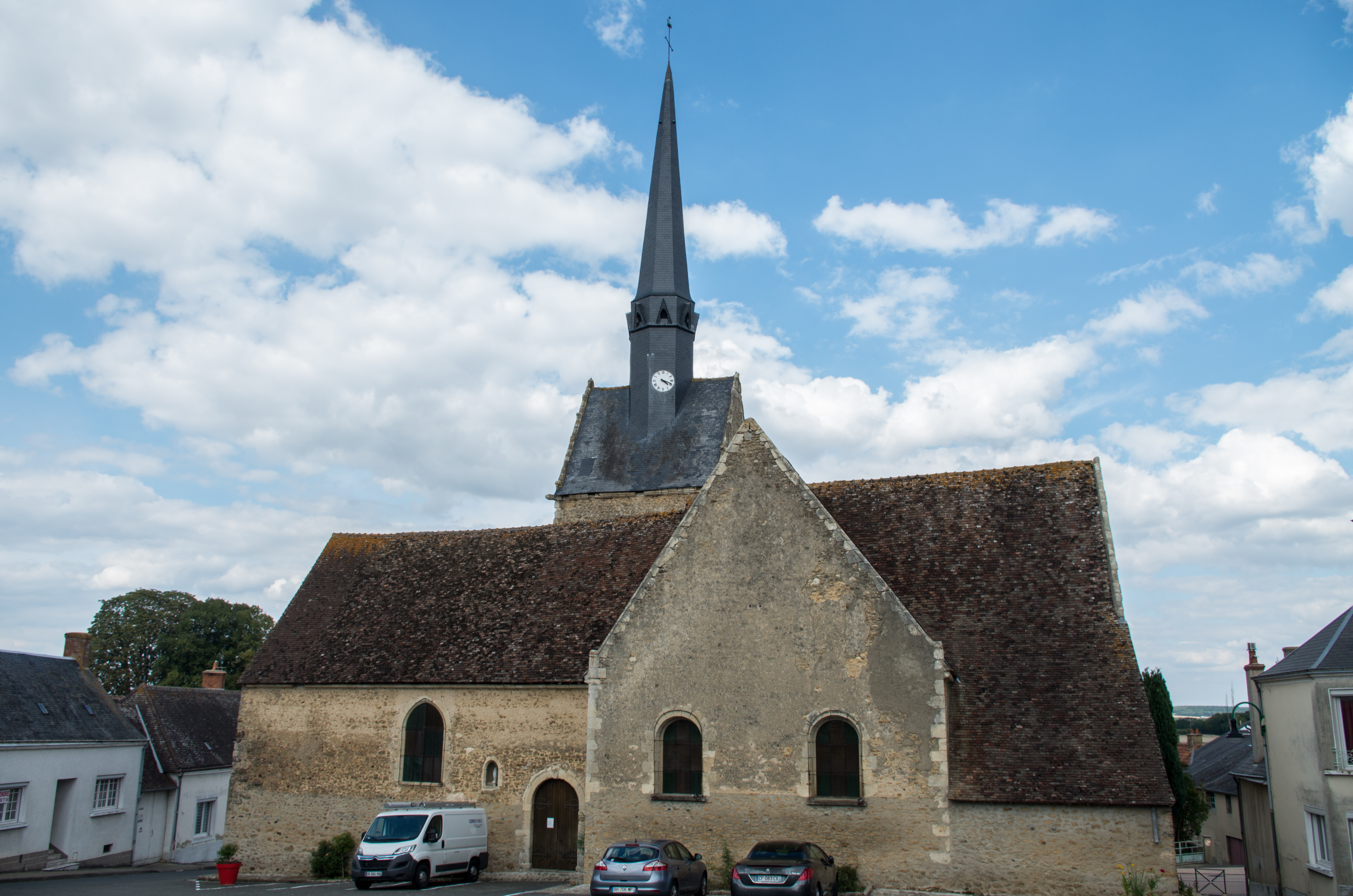
- The church of Saint Médard

- Coat of arms
- Location of Dollon
- Location within France Location within Pays de la Loire
- Coordinates: 48°02′17″N 0°35′19″E
- Country: France
- Region: Pays de la Loire
- Department: Sarthe
- Arrondissement: Mamers
- Canton: Saint-Calais
- Intercommunality: Vallées de la Braye et de l'Anille

Government
  - Mayor (2020–2026): Xavier Jamois
- Area^{1}: 25.4 km^{2} (9.8 sq mi)
- Highest elevation: 177 m (581 ft)
- Lowest elevation: 71 m (233 ft)
- Population (2023): 1,427
  - Density: 56.2/km^{2} (146/sq mi)
- Demonym(s): Dollonnais, Dollonnaise
- Time zone: UTC+01:00 (CET)
  - Summer (DST): UTC+02:00 (CEST)
- INSEE/Postal code: 72118 /72390
- ^{1} French Land Register data, which excludes lakes, ponds, glaciers > 1 km^{2} (0.386 sq mi or 247 acres) and river estuaries.

Dollon (French pronunciation: [dɔlɔ̃]) is a commune in the Sarthe department in the Pays de la Loire region in the northwest of France.

== See also ==
- Communes of the Sarthe department
