= Melleray, Sarthe =

Melleray
- Commune
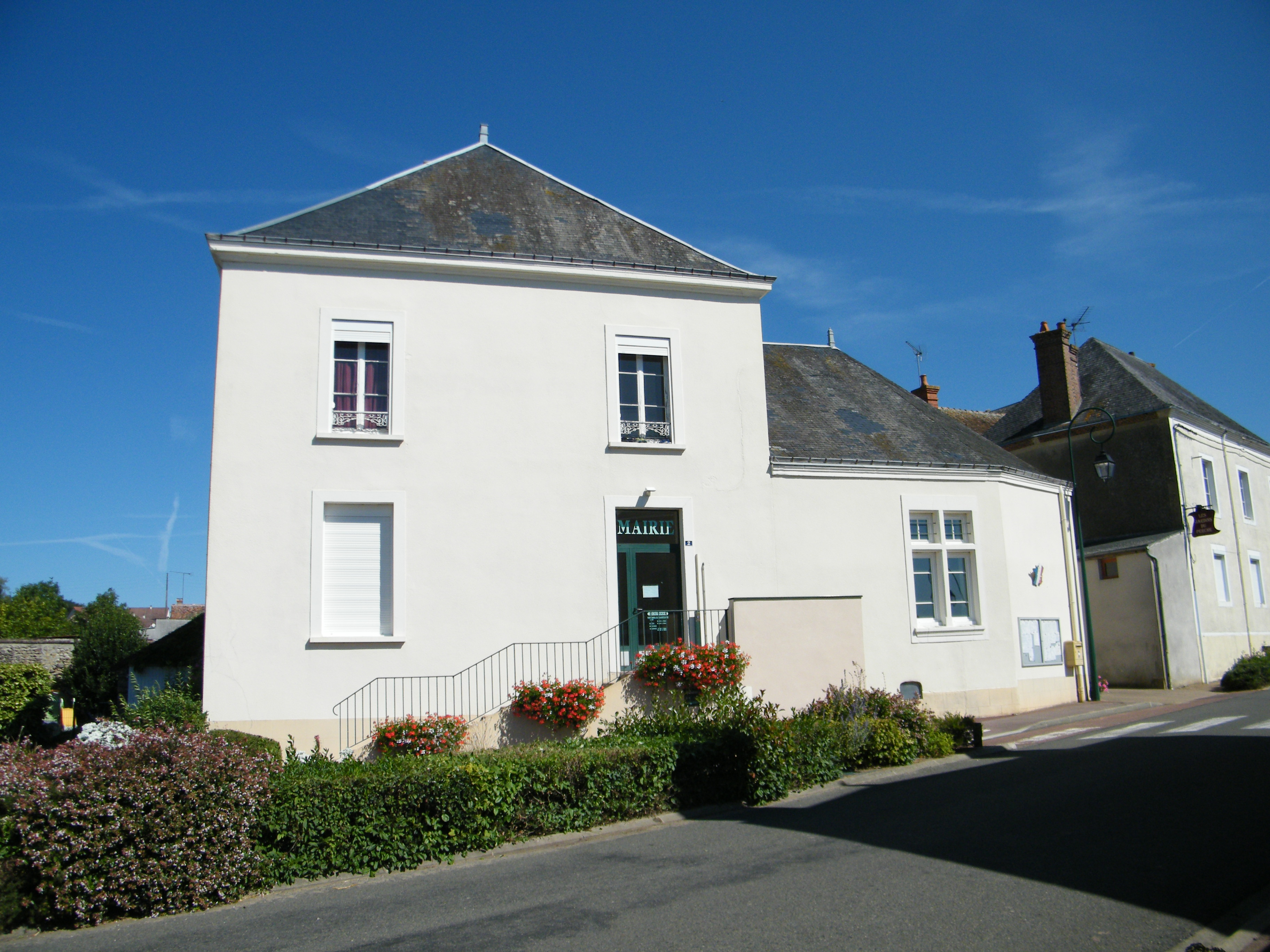
- The town hall of Melleray
- Location of Melleray
- Location within France Location within Pays de la Loire
- Coordinates: 48°05′57″N 0°47′59″E
- Country: France
- Region: Pays de la Loire
- Department: Sarthe
- Arrondissement: Mamers
- Canton: Saint-Calais
- Intercommunality: CC du Perche Emeraude

Government
  - Mayor (2020–2026): Jean-Pierre Torche
- Area^{1}: 25.70 km^{2} (9.92 sq mi)
- Population (2023): 454
  - Density: 17.7/km^{2} (45.8/sq mi)
- Time zone: UTC+01:00 (CET)
  - Summer (DST): UTC+02:00 (CEST)
- INSEE/Postal code: 72193 /72320
- ^{1} French Land Register data, which excludes lakes, ponds, glaciers > 1 km^{2} (0.386 sq mi or 247 acres) and river estuaries.

Melleray (French pronunciation: [mɛlʁɛ]) is a commune in the Sarthe department in the region of Pays de la Loire in north-western France.

== See also ==
- Communes of the Sarthe department
