= Rahay =

- Commune
- Location of Rahay
- Location within France Location within Pays de la Loire
- Coordinates: 47°57′43″N 0°49′57″E
- Country: France
- Region: Pays de la Loire
- Department: Sarthe
- Arrondissement: Mamers
- Canton: Saint-Calais
- Intercommunality: Vallées de la Braye et de l'Anille

Government
  - Mayor (2020–2026): Isabelle David
- Area^{1}: 19 km^{2} (7.3 sq mi)
- Population (2023): 167
  - Density: 8.8/km^{2} (23/sq mi)
- Demonym(s): Rahaysien, Rahaysienne
- Time zone: UTC+01:00 (CET)
  - Summer (DST): UTC+02:00 (CEST)
- INSEE/Postal code: 72250 /72120
- ^{1} French Land Register data, which excludes lakes, ponds, glaciers > 1 km^{2} (0.386 sq mi or 247 acres) and river estuaries.

Rahay (French pronunciation: [ʁa.ɛ]) is a commune in the Sarthe department in the region of Pays de la Loire in north-western France.

== See also ==
- Communes of the Sarthe department
