= Cogners =

- Commune
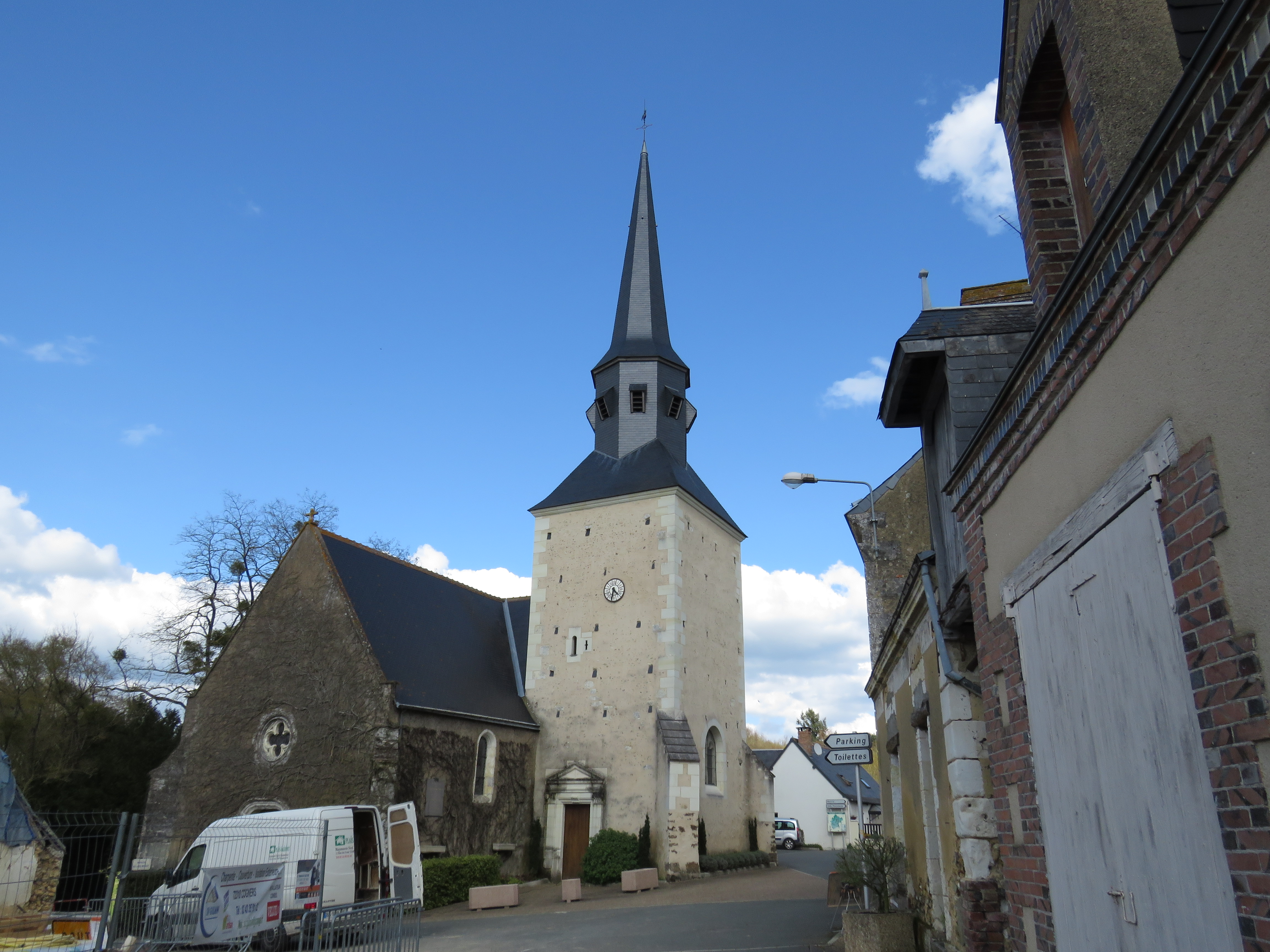
- The church of Saint Pierre and Saint Paul
- Location of Cogners
- Location within France Location within Pays de la Loire
- Coordinates: 47°52′10″N 0°39′41″E
- Country: France
- Region: Pays de la Loire
- Department: Sarthe
- Arrondissement: Mamers
- Canton: Saint-Calais
- Intercommunality: Vallées de la Braye et de l'Anille

Government
  - Mayor (2020–2026): Michel Cheron
- Area^{1}: 13.6 km^{2} (5.3 sq mi)
- Highest elevation: 161 m (528 ft)
- Lowest elevation: 92 m (302 ft)
- Population (2023): 170
  - Density: 13/km^{2} (32/sq mi)
- Demonym(s): Cognerois, Cogneroise
- Time zone: UTC+01:00 (CET)
  - Summer (DST): UTC+02:00 (CEST)
- INSEE/Postal code: 72085 /72310
- ^{1} French Land Register data, which excludes lakes, ponds, glaciers > 1 km^{2} (0.386 sq mi or 247 acres) and river estuaries.

Cogners is a commune in the Sarthe department in the Pays de la Loire region in north-western France.

== See also ==
- Communes of the Sarthe department
