= Saint-Gervais-de-Vic =

- Commune
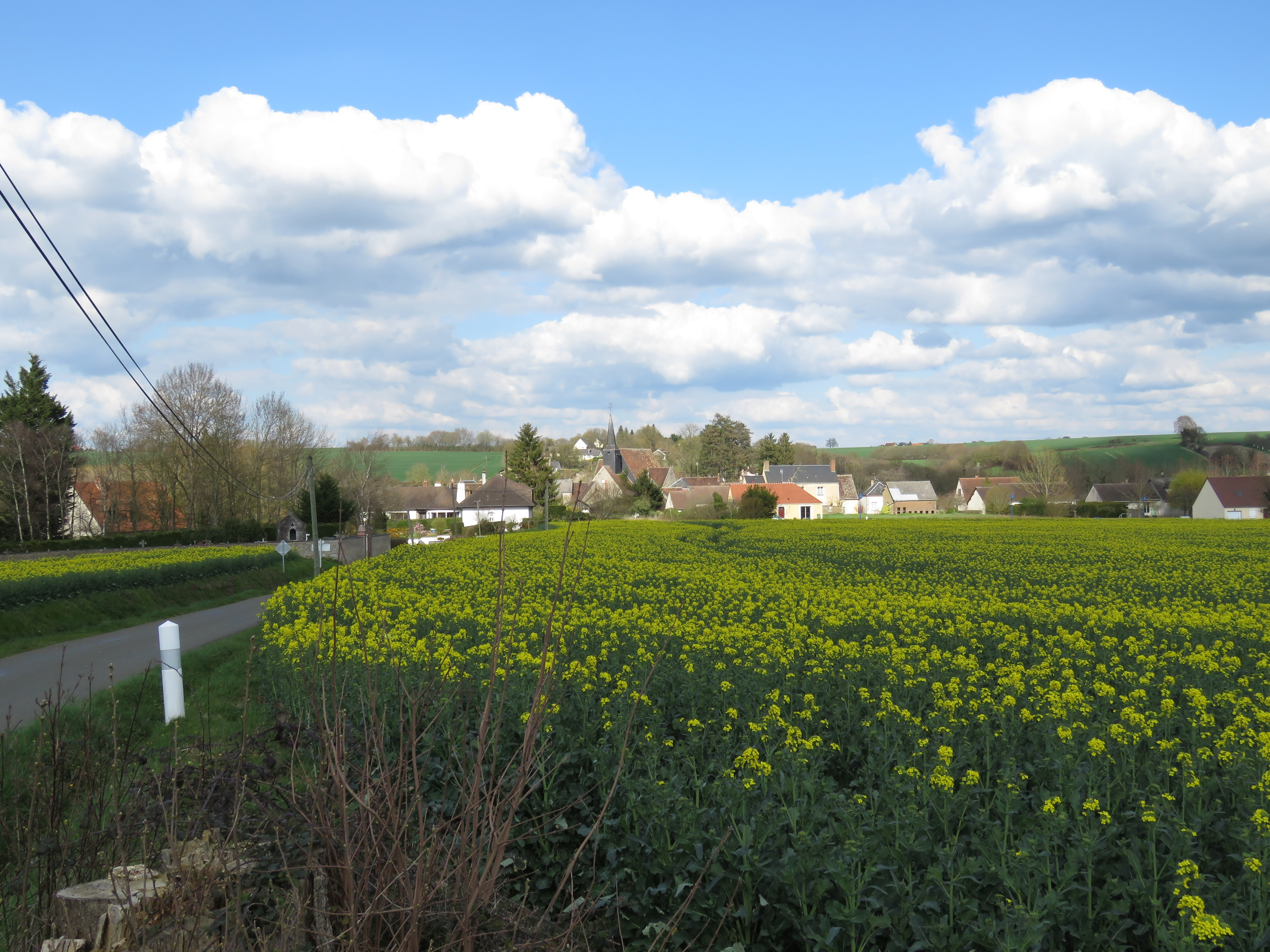
- A general view of Saint-Gervais-de-Vic
- Location of Saint-Gervais-de-Vic
- Location within France Location within Pays de la Loire
- Coordinates: 47°53′17″N 0°44′27″E
- Country: France
- Region: Pays de la Loire
- Department: Sarthe
- Arrondissement: Mamers
- Canton: Saint-Calais
- Intercommunality: Vallées de la Braye et de l'Anille

Government
  - Mayor (2020–2026): Claude Darroy
- Area^{1}: 16.03 km^{2} (6.19 sq mi)
- Highest elevation: 153 m (502 ft)
- Lowest elevation: 75 m (246 ft)
- Population (2023): 383
  - Density: 23.9/km^{2} (61.9/sq mi)
- Demonym(s): Gervaisien, Gervaisienne
- Time zone: UTC+01:00 (CET)
  - Summer (DST): UTC+02:00 (CEST)
- INSEE/Postal code: 72286 /72120
- ^{1} French Land Register data, which excludes lakes, ponds, glaciers > 1 km^{2} (0.386 sq mi or 247 acres) and river estuaries.

Saint-Gervais-de-Vic (French pronunciation: [sɛ̃ ʒɛʁvɛ də vik]) is a commune in the Sarthe department in the region of Pays de la Loire in north-western France.

== See also ==
- Communes of the Sarthe department
