= Canton of Saint-Calais =

Coordinates: 47.92°N 0.74°E

The canton of Saint-Calais is an administrative division of the Sarthe department, northwestern France. Its borders were modified at the French canton reorganisation which came into effect in March 2015. Its seat is in Saint-Calais.

It consists of the following communes:

1. Berfay
2. Bessé-sur-Braye
3. Bouloire
4. Champrond
5. La Chapelle-Huon
6. Cogners
7. Conflans-sur-Anille
8. Coudrecieux
9. Courgenard
10. Dollon
11. Écorpain
12. Gréez-sur-Roc
13. Lamnay
14. Lavaré
15. Maisoncelles
16. Marolles-lès-Saint-Calais
17. Melleray
18. Montaillé
19. Montmirail
20. Rahay
21. Saint-Calais
22. Sainte-Cérotte
23. Saint-Gervais-de-Vic
24. Saint-Jean-des-Échelles
25. Saint-Maixent
26. Saint-Michel-de-Chavaignes
27. Saint-Ulphace
28. Semur-en-Vallon
29. Thorigné-sur-Dué
30. Tresson
31. Val-de-la-Hune
32. Val-d'Étangson
33. Valennes
34. Vancé
35. Vibraye
