= Saint-Calais =

- Commune
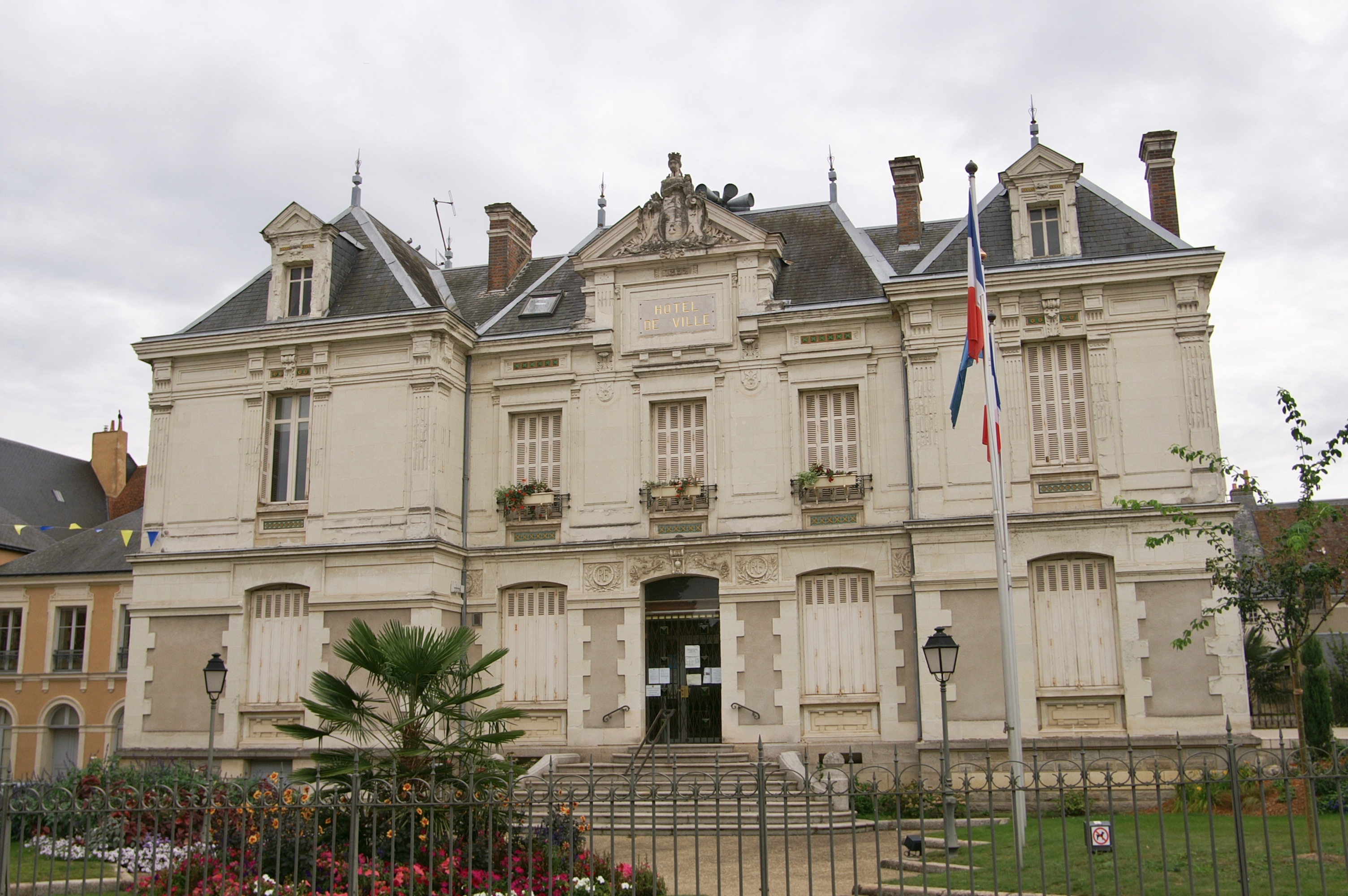
- The town hall of Saint-Calais

- Coat of arms
- Location of Saint-Calais
- Location within France Location within Pays de la Loire
- Coordinates: 47°55′16″N 0°44′38″E
- Country: France
- Region: Pays de la Loire
- Department: Sarthe
- Arrondissement: Mamers
- Canton: Saint-Calais
- Intercommunality: Vallées de la Braye et de l'Anille

Government
  - Mayor (2020–2026): Marc Mercier
- Area^{1}: 22.76 km^{2} (8.79 sq mi)
- Highest elevation: 163 m (535 ft)
- Lowest elevation: 87 m (285 ft)
- Population (2023): 2,948
  - Density: 129.5/km^{2} (335.5/sq mi)
- Demonym(s): Calaisien, Calaisienne; Saint-Calaisien, Saint-Calaisienne
- Time zone: UTC+01:00 (CET)
  - Summer (DST): UTC+02:00 (CEST)
- INSEE/Postal code: 72269 /72120
- ^{1} French Land Register data, which excludes lakes, ponds, glaciers > 1 km^{2} (0.386 sq mi or 247 acres) and river estuaries.

Saint-Calais (French pronunciation: [sɛ̃ kalɛ]) is a commune in the Sarthe department in the region of Pays de la Loire in north-western France.

Prior to the French Revolution it was known for its Benedictine abbey named after the Anisola stream (modern Aniole, a tributary of the Braye). Saint-Calais is a later name coming from one of the local saints of the Perche area. William of St. Calais, a product of this monastery, was a post-conquest bishop of Durham. There are no remains of the Abbey, which was a principal land-owner in the vicinity. The existing parish church has a fine Renaissance facade. The Aniole was dammed by the monks, thereby retaining a significant lake area.

Reaction against monastic landowners and the relative proximity to Paris (under twenty-four hours by stage-coach) conditioned the nineteenth century politics of the town. The coming of the railways and more recently of the motorway favoured neighbouring La Ferté-Bernard which has grown at the expense of Saint-Calais, which has a population under 4000 and which lost its sous-préfecture status in 1926. The town however retains certain services appropriate to that level, e.g. hospital facilities.

== History ==
Saint-Calais was involved in the 1906 Grand Prix de l'Automobile Club de France, the world's first motoring Grand Prix. The D357 towards Le Mans and the D1 towards Vibraye and La Ferté-Bernard formed two sides of the triangular course.

== Population ==
Historical population
Year	Pop.	±% p.a.
1968	4,251	—
1975	4,320	+0.23%
1982	4,445	+0.41%
1990	4,063	−1.12%
1999	3,785	−0.78%
2007	3,595	−0.64%
2012	3,359	−1.35%
2017	3,236	−0.74%
2023	2,948	−1.54%
Source: INSEE

== People ==
Famous persons from the town include Cardinal Louis-Ernest Dubois, archbishop of Rouen and subsequently archbishop of Paris in the early twentieth century.

== See also ==
- Communes of the Sarthe department
