= Grez =

Grez may refer to:

== People ==
- Benjamín Grez (born 1992), Chilean sailor
- Cristóbal Grez (born 1987), Chilean sailor
- José Matías Grez (1766–1840), Chilean politician, mayor of Rancagua between 1804 and 1805
- Vicente Grez (1847–1909), Chilean politician, journalist, and writer

== Places ==
- Grez, Oise, in France
- Grez-Doiceau in Belgium
- Grez-Neuville in France
- Le Grez in France
- Grez-en-Bouère in France
- Grez-sur-Loing in France
- Grez, Navarre, in Spain
