= Neuvillette =

Neuvillette may refer to:

- Neuvillette, Aisne, a commune in the department of Aisne
- Neuvillette, Somme, a commune in the department of Somme
- Neuvillette-en-Charnie, a commune in the department of Sarthe
- Neuvillette, a character in the 2020 video game Genshin Impact
