= Grès (disambiguation) =

Grès or Gres may refer to:

- The French fashion house of Grès
- Stoneware, a type of ceramic
- Earthenware, a type of ceramic

== See also ==
- GRES (disambiguation)
- GRE (disambiguation)
- Grez (disambiguation)
