= Béthon =

- Commune
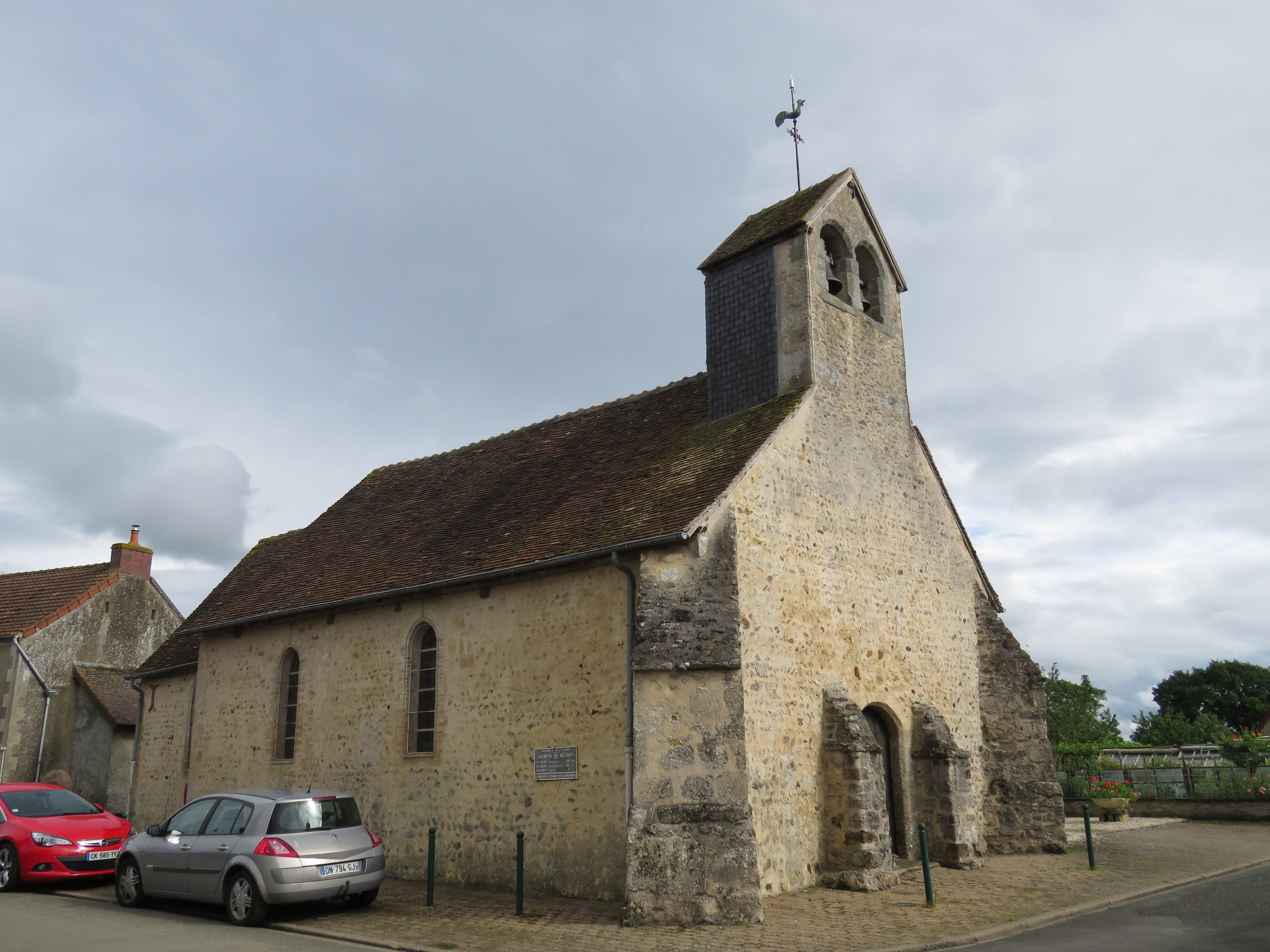
- The church
- Location of Béthon
- Location within France Location within Pays de la Loire
- Coordinates: 48°21′33″N 0°05′13″E
- Country: France
- Region: Pays de la Loire
- Department: Sarthe
- Arrondissement: Mamers
- Canton: Sillé-le-Guillaume
- Intercommunality: Haute Sarthe Alpes Mancelles

Government
  - Mayor (2020–2026): Gérard Vieillepeau
- Area^{1}: 3.85 km^{2} (1.49 sq mi)
- Highest elevation: 196 m (643 ft)
- Lowest elevation: 133 m (436 ft)
- Population (2023): 323
  - Density: 83.9/km^{2} (217/sq mi)
- Demonym: Béthunéens
- Time zone: UTC+01:00 (CET)
  - Summer (DST): UTC+02:00 (CEST)
- INSEE/Postal code: 72036 /72610
- ^{1} French Land Register data, which excludes lakes, ponds, glaciers > 1 km^{2} (0.386 sq mi or 247 acres) and river estuaries.

Béthon (French pronunciation: [betɔ̃]) is a commune in the Sarthe department in the region of Pays de la Loire in north-western France.

== Geography ==
The commune is made up of the following collection of villages and hamlets, La Chesnaie, Le Point du Jour and Béthon.

== See also ==
- Communes of the Sarthe department
