= Sougé-le-Ganelon =

- Commune
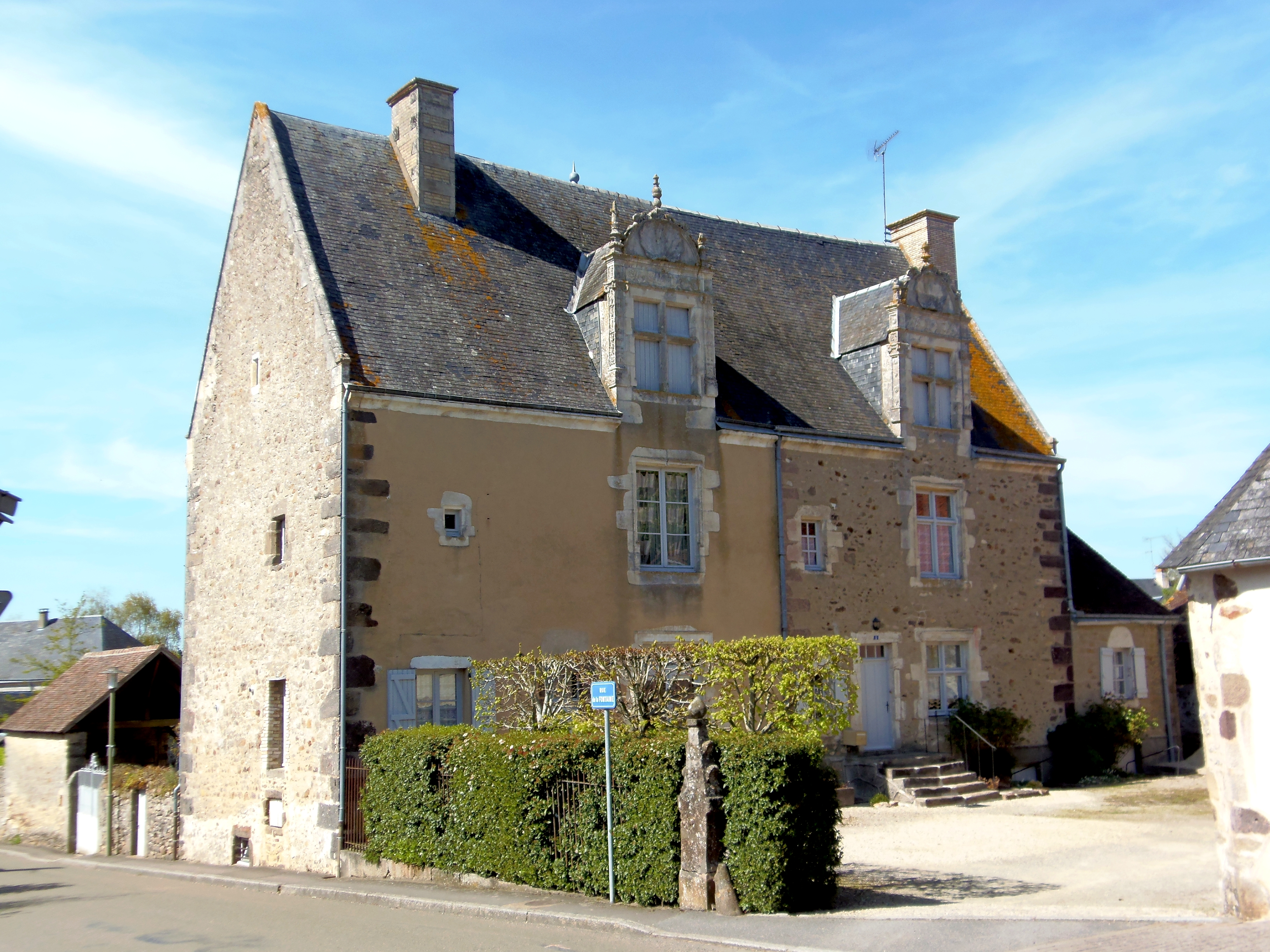
- The priory of Saint-Martin
- Location of Sougé-le-Ganelon
- Location within France Location within Pays de la Loire
- Coordinates: 48°19′06″N 0°01′48″E
- Country: France
- Region: Pays de la Loire
- Department: Sarthe
- Arrondissement: Mamers
- Canton: Sillé-le-Guillaume
- Intercommunality: Haute Sarthe Alpes Mancelles

Government
  - Mayor (2020–2026): Philippe Rallu
- Area^{1}: 18.11 km^{2} (6.99 sq mi)
- Highest elevation: 198 m (650 ft)
- Lowest elevation: 77 m (253 ft)
- Population (2023): 826
  - Density: 45.6/km^{2} (118/sq mi)
- Time zone: UTC+01:00 (CET)
  - Summer (DST): UTC+02:00 (CEST)
- INSEE/Postal code: 72337 /72130
- Website: www.sougeleganelon.fr
- ^{1} French Land Register data, which excludes lakes, ponds, glaciers > 1 km^{2} (0.386 sq mi or 247 acres) and river estuaries.

Sougé-le-Ganelon (French pronunciation: [suʒe lə ɡanlɔ̃]) is a commune in the Sarthe department in the region of Pays de la Loire in north-western France.

== See also ==
- Communes of the Sarthe department
- Parc naturel régional Normandie-Maine
