= GRES =

GRES may refer to:

- GRES (power station), a Russian term referring to a condenser type electricity-only thermal power station
- Grêmio Recreativo Escola de Samba (Recreative Guild Samba School), an acronym used by Brazilian Samba schools

== See also ==
- Grès (disambiguation)
