= Grandchamp, Sarthe =

Grandchamp
- Commune
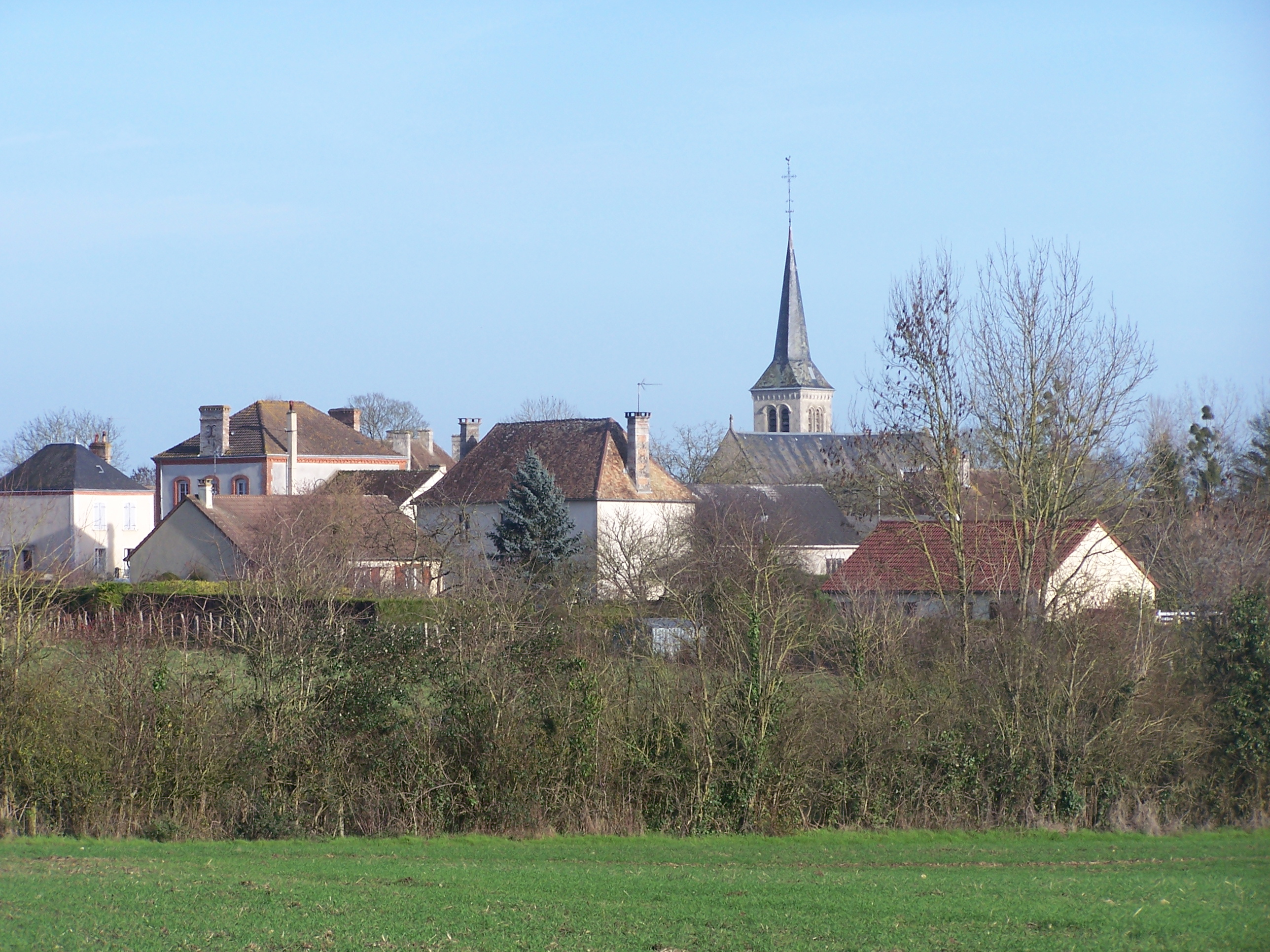
- The village of Grandchamp
- Location of Grandchamp
- Location within France Location within Pays de la Loire
- Coordinates: 48°18′10″N 0°10′58″E
- Country: France
- Region: Pays de la Loire
- Department: Sarthe
- Arrondissement: Mamers
- Canton: Sillé-le-Guillaume
- Intercommunality: Haute Sarthe Alpes Mancelles

Government
  - Mayor (2020–2026): Claude Castel
- Area^{1}: 5.38 km^{2} (2.08 sq mi)
- Highest elevation: 146 m (479 ft)
- Lowest elevation: 81 m (266 ft)
- Population (2023): 137
  - Density: 25.5/km^{2} (66.0/sq mi)
- Demonym: Grandchampenois
- Time zone: UTC+01:00 (CET)
  - Summer (DST): UTC+02:00 (CEST)
- INSEE/Postal code: 72142 /72490
- ^{1} French Land Register data, which excludes lakes, ponds, glaciers > 1 km^{2} (0.386 sq mi or 247 acres) and river estuaries.

Grandchamp French pronunciation: [ɡʁɑ̃ʃɑ̃] is a commune in the Sarthe department in the region of Pays de la Loire in north-western France.

== See also ==
- Communes of the Sarthe department
