= Mont-Saint-Jean, Sarthe =

Mont-Saint-Jean
- Commune
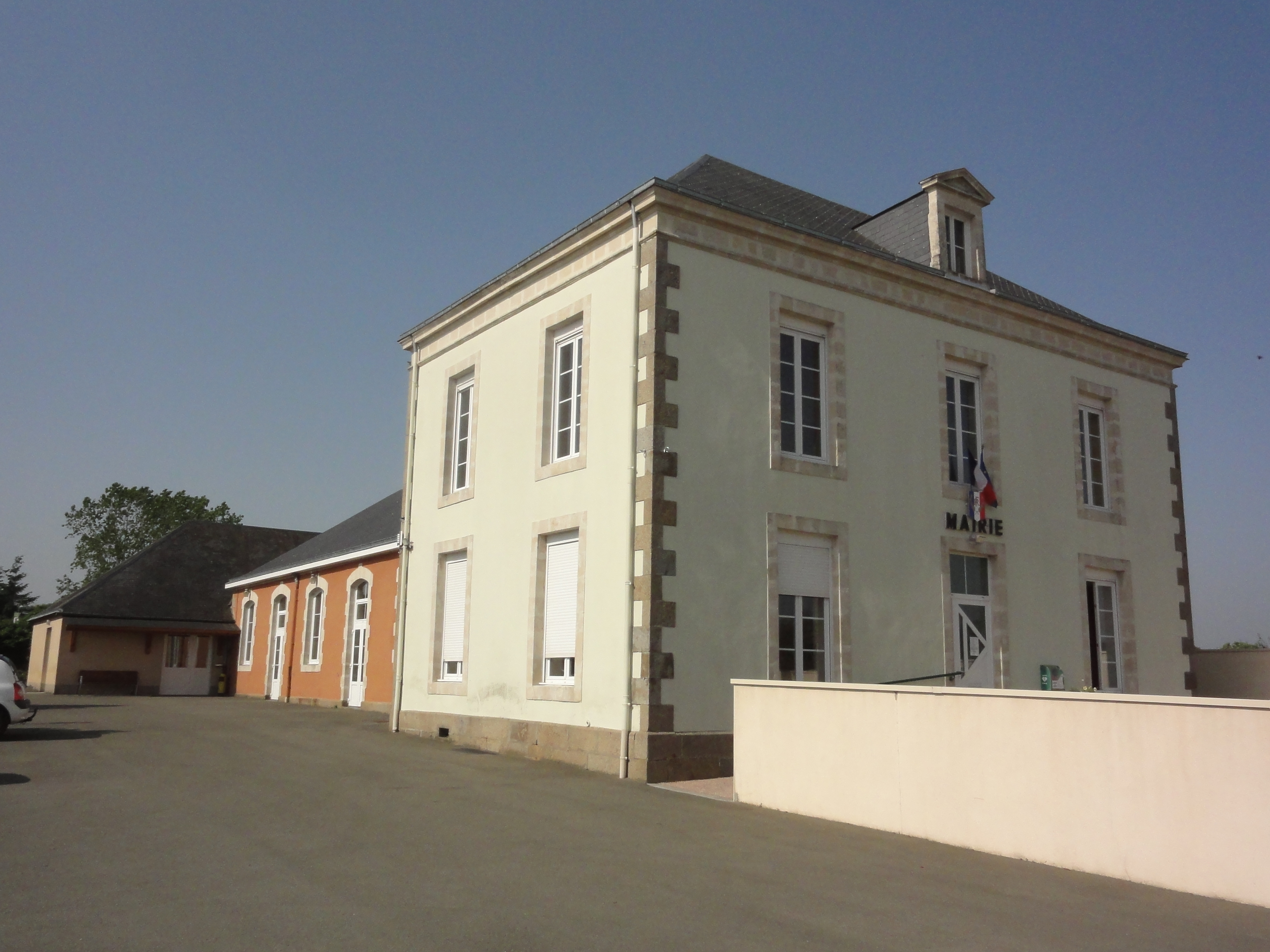
- Mont-Saint-Jean Town hall

- Coat of arms
- Location of Mont-Saint-Jean
- Location within France Location within Pays de la Loire
- Coordinates: 48°14′47″N 0°06′27″E
- Country: France
- Region: Pays de la Loire
- Department: Sarthe
- Arrondissement: Mamers
- Canton: Sillé-le-Guillaume

Government
  - Mayor (2020–2026): Daniel Lefevre
- Area^{1}: 42.31 km^{2} (16.34 sq mi)
- Highest elevation: 271 m (889 ft)
- Lowest elevation: 95 m (312 ft)
- Population (2023): 628
  - Density: 14.8/km^{2} (38.4/sq mi)
- Time zone: UTC+01:00 (CET)
  - Summer (DST): UTC+02:00 (CEST)
- INSEE/Postal code: 72211 /72140
- ^{1} French Land Register data, which excludes lakes, ponds, glaciers > 1 km^{2} (0.386 sq mi or 247 acres) and river estuaries.

Mont-Saint-Jean (French pronunciation: [mɔ̃ sɛ̃ ʒɑ̃]) is a commune in the Sarthe department in the region of Pays de la Loire in north-western France.

== See also ==
- Communes of the Sarthe department
- Parc naturel régional Normandie-Maine
