= Moitron-sur-Sarthe =

- Commune
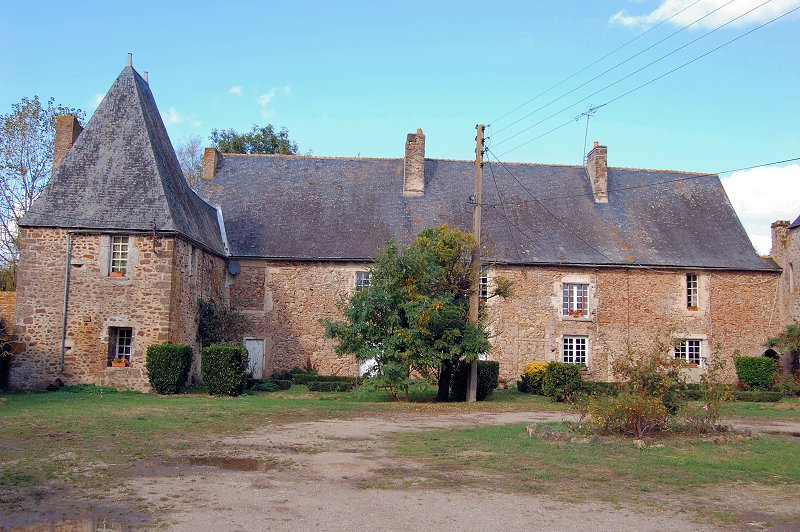
- The templar preceptory of Gué-Lian
- Location of Moitron-sur-Sarthe
- Location within France Location within Pays de la Loire
- Coordinates: 48°14′26″N 0°02′05″E
- Country: France
- Region: Pays de la Loire
- Department: Sarthe
- Arrondissement: Mamers
- Canton: Sillé-le-Guillaume
- Intercommunality: Haute Sarthe Alpes Mancelles

Government
  - Mayor (2020–2026): Guy Chaudemanche
- Area^{1}: 10.32 km^{2} (3.98 sq mi)
- Elevation: 88 m (289 ft)
- Highest elevation: 192 m (630 ft)
- Lowest elevation: 62 m (203 ft)
- Population (2023): 258
  - Density: 25.0/km^{2} (64.7/sq mi)
- Demonym: Moitronnais
- Time zone: UTC+01:00 (CET)
  - Summer (DST): UTC+02:00 (CEST)
- INSEE/Postal code: 72199 /72170
- ^{1} French Land Register data, which excludes lakes, ponds, glaciers > 1 km^{2} (0.386 sq mi or 247 acres) and river estuaries.

Moitron-sur-Sarthe (French pronunciation: [mwatʁɔ̃ syʁ saʁt], literally Moitron on Sarthe) is a commune in the Sarthe department in the region of Pays de la Loire in north-western France.

== See also ==
- Communes of the Sarthe department
