= Juillé, Sarthe =

Juillé
- Commune
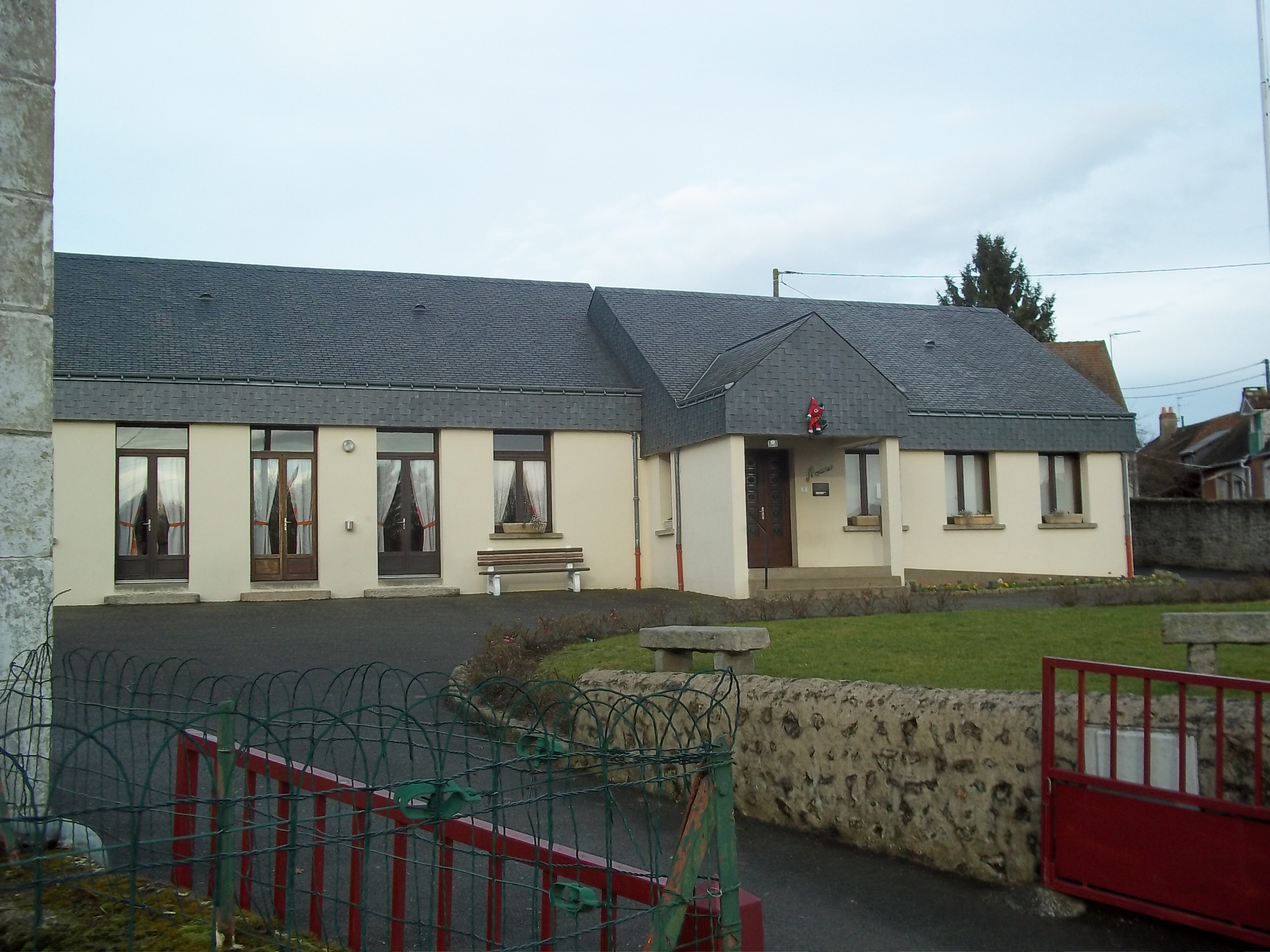
- The town hall of Juillé

- Coat of arms
- Location of Juillé
- Location within France Location within Pays de la Loire
- Coordinates: 48°14′45″N 0°07′18″E
- Country: France
- Region: Pays de la Loire
- Department: Sarthe
- Arrondissement: Mamers
- Canton: Sillé-le-Guillaume
- Intercommunality: Haute Sarthe Alpes Mancelles

Government
  - Mayor (2020–2026): Francis Cantillon
- Area^{1}: 5.72 km^{2} (2.21 sq mi)
- Highest elevation: 95 m (312 ft)
- Lowest elevation: 61 m (200 ft)
- Population (2023): 407
  - Density: 71.2/km^{2} (184/sq mi)
- Demonym(s): Juilléen, Juilléenne
- Time zone: UTC+01:00 (CET)
  - Summer (DST): UTC+02:00 (CEST)
- INSEE/Postal code: 72152 /72170
- ^{1} French Land Register data, which excludes lakes, ponds, glaciers > 1 km^{2} (0.386 sq mi or 247 acres) and river estuaries.

Juillé (French pronunciation: [ʒɥije]) is a commune in the Sarthe department in the region of Pays de la Loire in north-western France.

== See also ==
- Communes of the Sarthe department
