= Thoiré-sous-Contensor =

- Commune
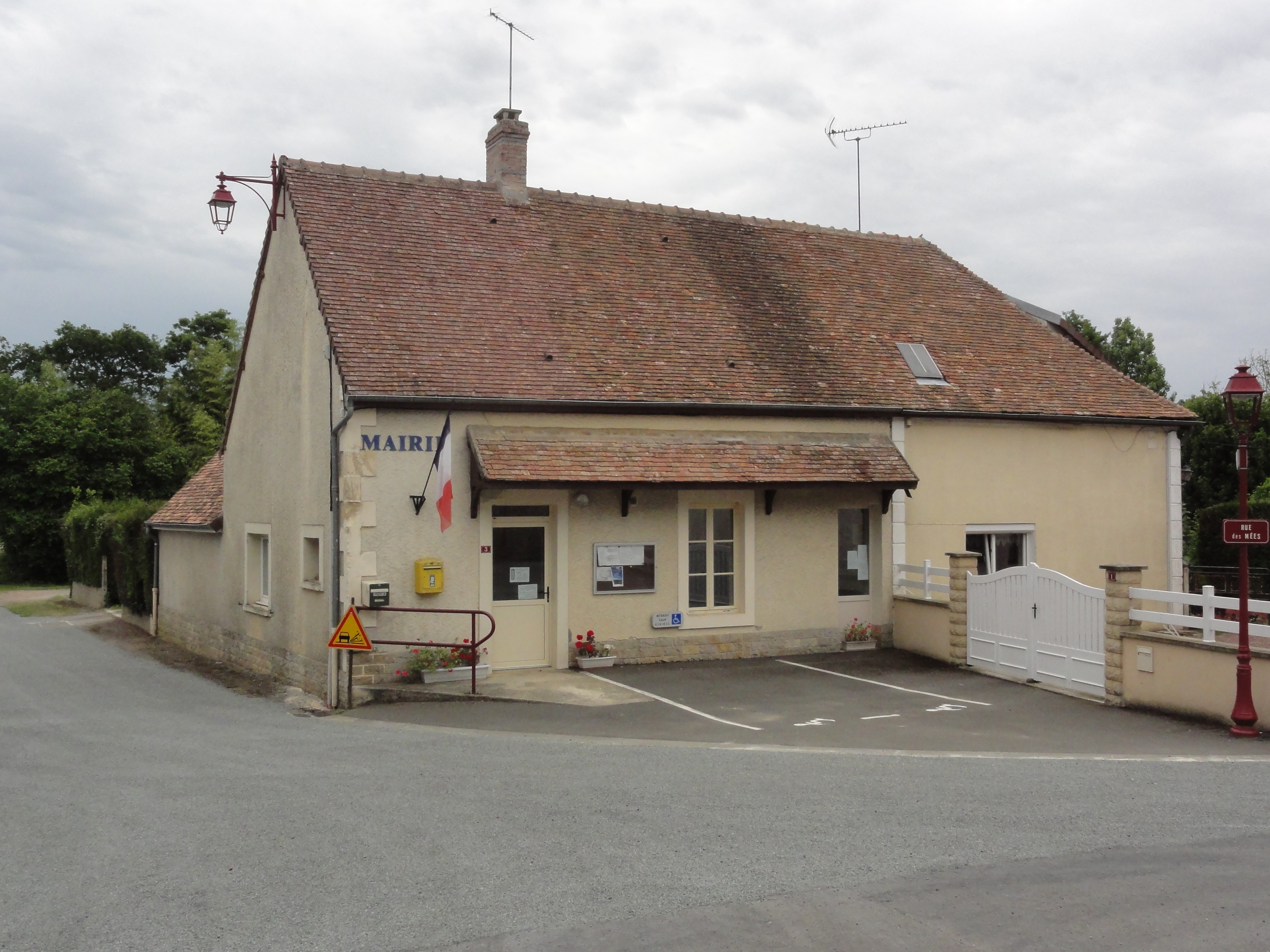
- Thoiré-sous-Contensor Town hall
- Location of Thoiré-sous-Contensor
- Location within France Location within Pays de la Loire
- Coordinates: 48°18′48″N 0°12′04″E
- Country: France
- Region: Pays de la Loire
- Department: Sarthe
- Arrondissement: Mamers
- Canton: Sillé-le-Guillaume
- Intercommunality: Haute Sarthe Alpes Mancelles

Government
  - Mayor (2020–2026): Patrick Boree
- Area^{1}: 5.99 km^{2} (2.31 sq mi)
- Highest elevation: 133 m (436 ft)
- Lowest elevation: 85 m (279 ft)
- Population (2023): 111
  - Density: 18.5/km^{2} (48.0/sq mi)
- Demonym(s): Thoréen, Thoréenne
- Time zone: UTC+01:00 (CET)
  - Summer (DST): UTC+02:00 (CEST)
- INSEE/Postal code: 72355 /72610
- ^{1} French Land Register data, which excludes lakes, ponds, glaciers > 1 km^{2} (0.386 sq mi or 247 acres) and river estuaries.

Thoiré-sous-Contensor (French pronunciation: [twaʁe su kɔ̃tɑ̃sɔʁ]) is a commune in the Sarthe department in the region of Pays de la Loire in north-western France.

== See also ==
- Communes of the Sarthe department
