= Douillet =

- Commune
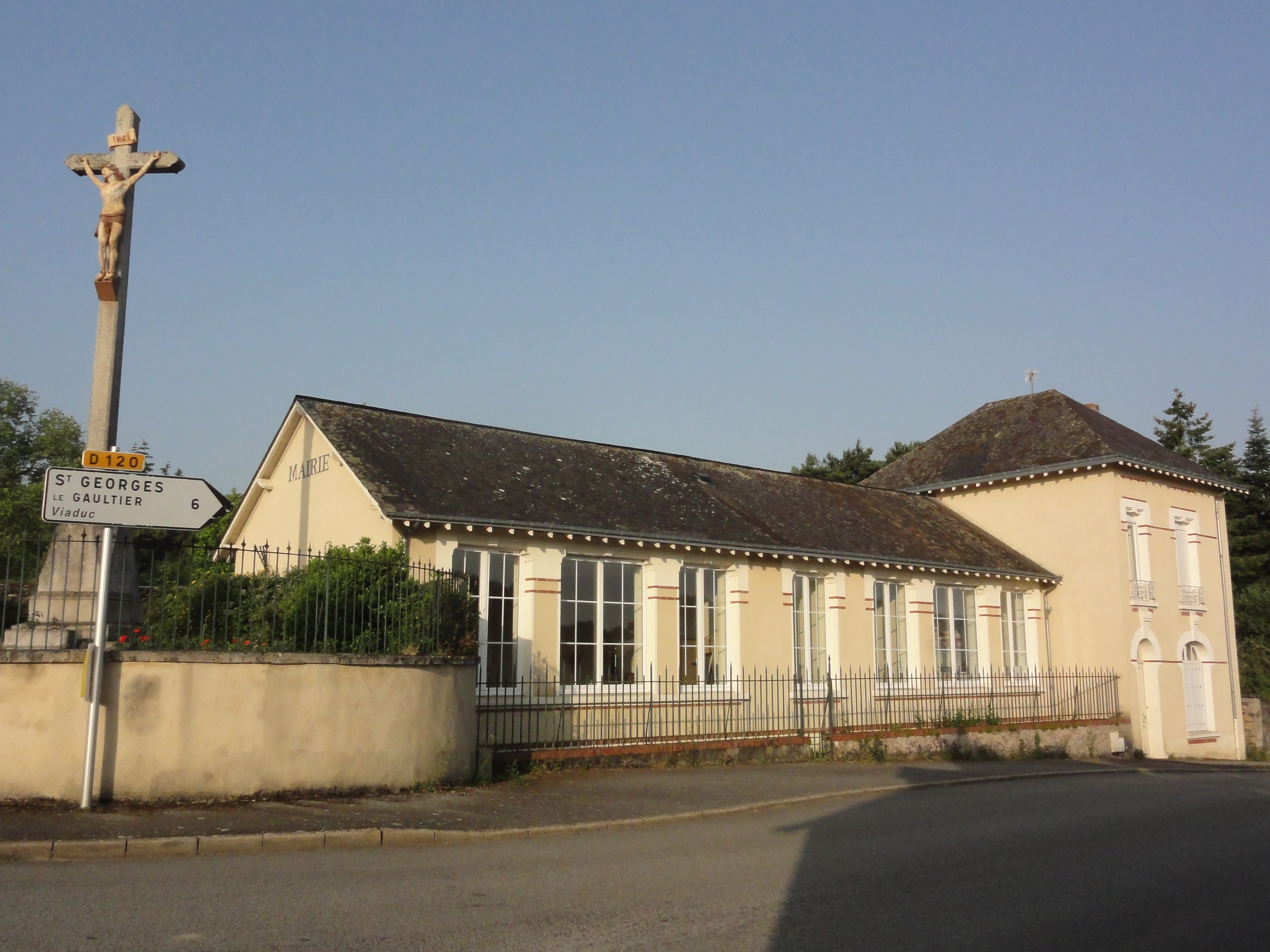
- Douillet Town hall
- Location of Douillet
- Location within France Location within Pays de la Loire
- Coordinates: 48°16′23″N 0°02′33″W
- Country: France
- Region: Pays de la Loire
- Department: Sarthe
- Arrondissement: Mamers
- Canton: Sillé-le-Guillaume
- Intercommunality: Haute Sarthe Alpes Mancelles

Government
  - Mayor (2020–2026): Nicole Calluaud
- Area^{1}: 18.99 km^{2} (7.33 sq mi)
- Elevation: 110 m (360 ft)
- Highest elevation: 164 m (538 ft)
- Lowest elevation: 72 m (236 ft)
- Population (2023): 319
  - Density: 16.8/km^{2} (43.5/sq mi)
- Time zone: UTC+01:00 (CET)
  - Summer (DST): UTC+02:00 (CEST)
- INSEE/Postal code: 72121 /72590
- ^{1} French Land Register data, which excludes lakes, ponds, glaciers > 1 km^{2} (0.386 sq mi or 247 acres) and river estuaries.

Douillet (French pronunciation: [dujɛ]) is a commune in the Sarthe department in the Pays de la Loire region in north-western France.

== See also ==
- Communes of the Sarthe department
