= Livet-en-Saosnois =

- Commune
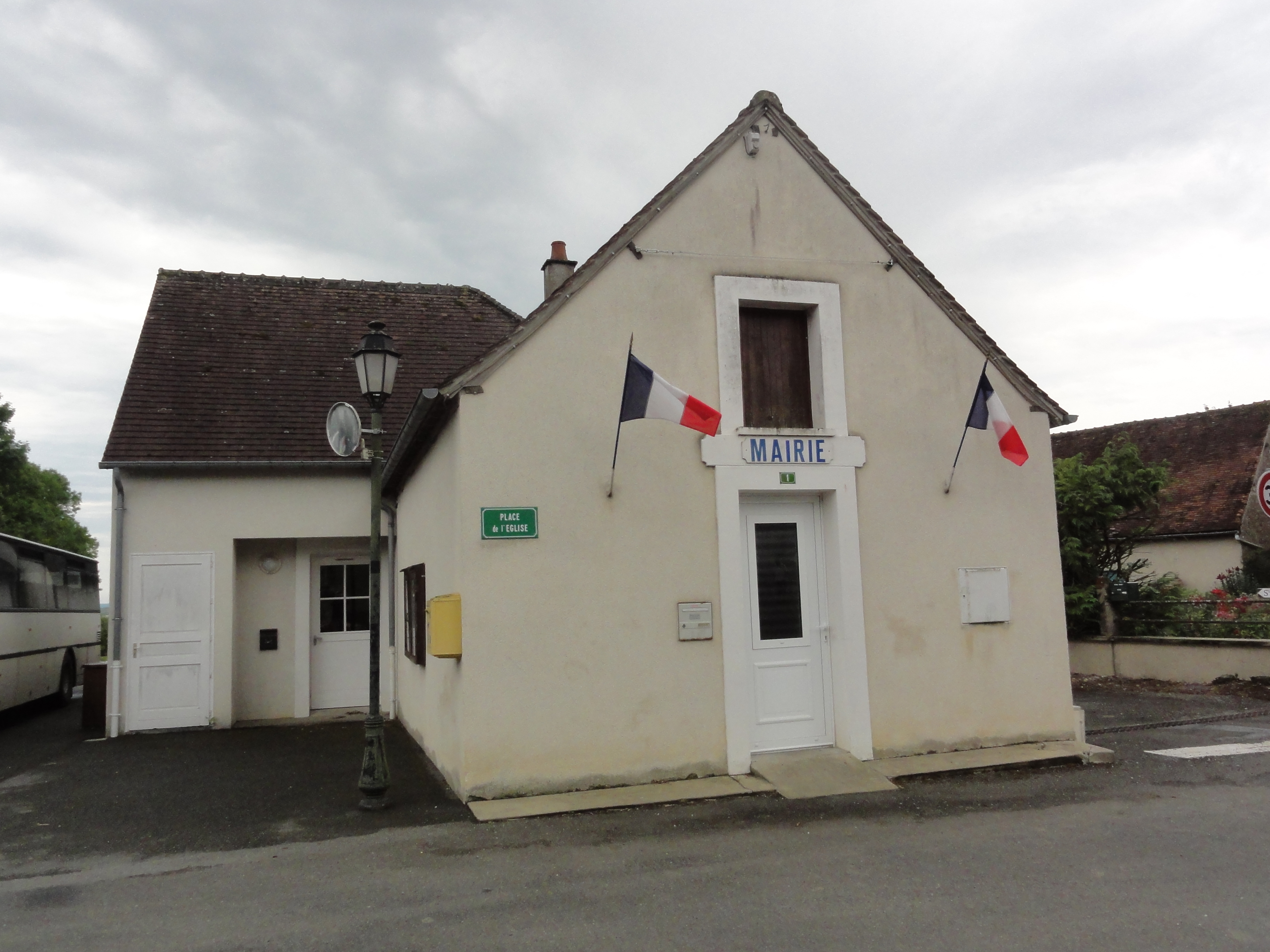
- Livet-en-Saosnois Town hall
- Location of Livet-en-Saosnois
- Location within France Location within Pays de la Loire
- Coordinates: 48°21′35″N 0°12′47″E
- Country: France
- Region: Pays de la Loire
- Department: Sarthe
- Arrondissement: Mamers
- Canton: Sillé-le-Guillaume
- Intercommunality: Haute Sarthe Alpes Mancelles

Government
  - Mayor (2020–2026): Bruno Geslin
- Area^{1}: 1.60 km^{2} (0.62 sq mi)
- Highest elevation: 203 m (666 ft)
- Lowest elevation: 117 m (384 ft)
- Population (2023): 63
  - Density: 39/km^{2} (100/sq mi)
- Demonym(s): Livetain, Livetaine
- Time zone: UTC+01:00 (CET)
  - Summer (DST): UTC+02:00 (CEST)
- INSEE/Postal code: 72164 /72610
- ^{1} French Land Register data, which excludes lakes, ponds, glaciers > 1 km^{2} (0.386 sq mi or 247 acres) and river estuaries.

Livet-en-Saosnois (French pronunciation: [livɛ ɑ̃ sonwa]) is a commune in the Sarthe department in the region of Pays de la Loire in northwestern France.

== Geography ==
The commune is in the Normandie-Maine Regional Natural Park.

== See also ==
- Communes of the Sarthe department
- Parc naturel régional Normandie-Maine
