= Montreuil-le-Chétif =

- Commune
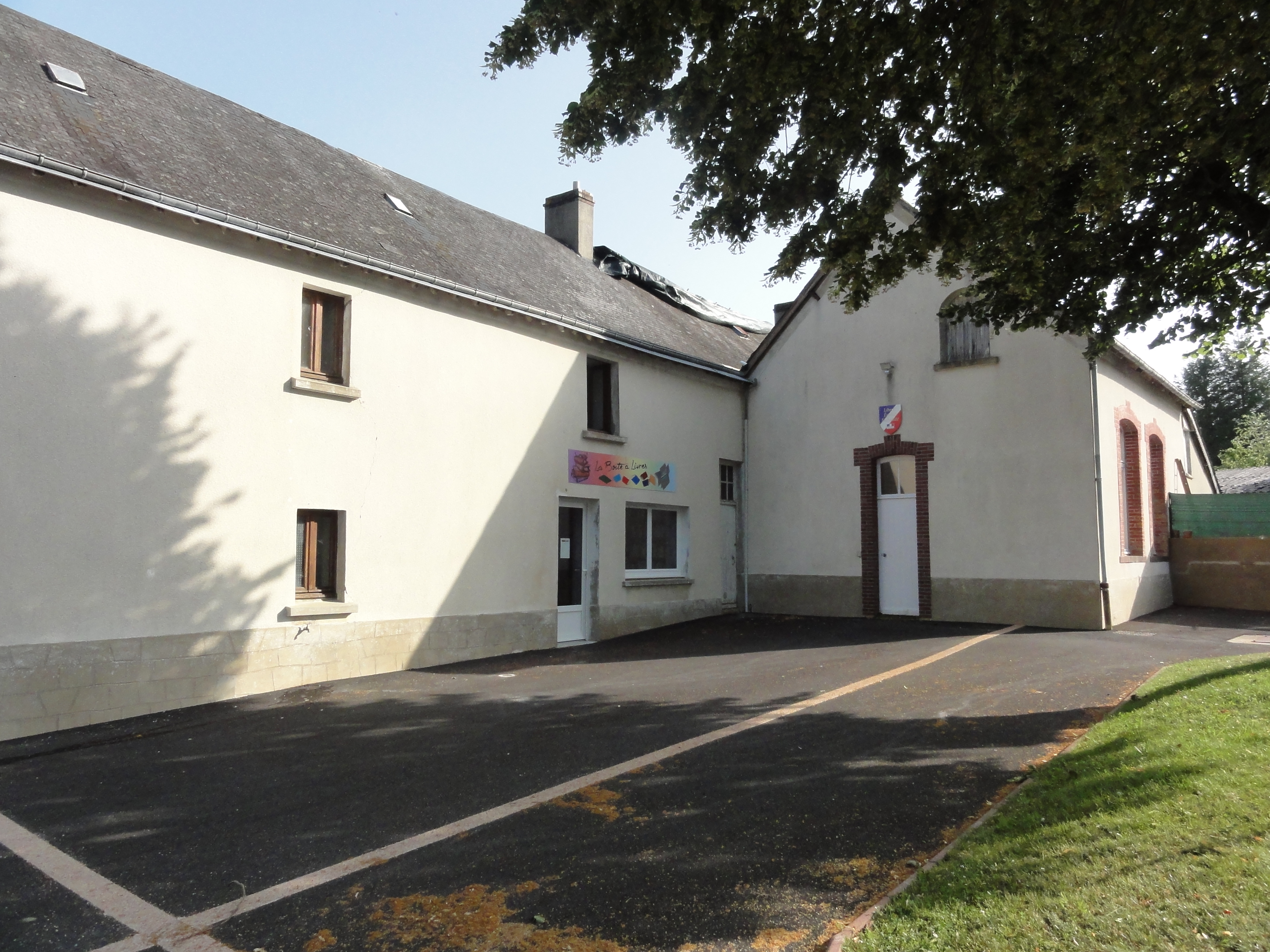
- Montreuil-le-Chétif Town hall
- Location of Montreuil-le-Chétif
- Location within France Location within Pays de la Loire
- Coordinates: 48°14′43″N 0°02′10″W
- Country: France
- Region: Pays de la Loire
- Department: Sarthe
- Arrondissement: Mamers
- Canton: Sillé-le-Guillaume

Government
  - Mayor (2020–2026): Marie-France Guyon
- Area^{1}: 14.64 km^{2} (5.65 sq mi)
- Elevation: 179 m (587 ft)
- Highest elevation: 229 m (751 ft)
- Lowest elevation: 89 m (292 ft)
- Population (2023): 318
  - Density: 21.7/km^{2} (56.3/sq mi)
- Demonym: Montreuillais
- Time zone: UTC+01:00 (CET)
  - Summer (DST): UTC+02:00 (CEST)
- INSEE/Postal code: 72209 /72130
- Website: montreuil72.free.fr
- ^{1} French Land Register data, which excludes lakes, ponds, glaciers > 1 km^{2} (0.386 sq mi or 247 acres) and river estuaries.

Montreuil-le-Chétif (French pronunciation: [mɔ̃tʁœj lə ʃetif]) is a commune in Sarthe, a department in the region of Pays de la Loire in north-western France.

== See also ==
- Communes of the Sarthe department
