= Saint-Christophe-du-Jambet =

- Commune
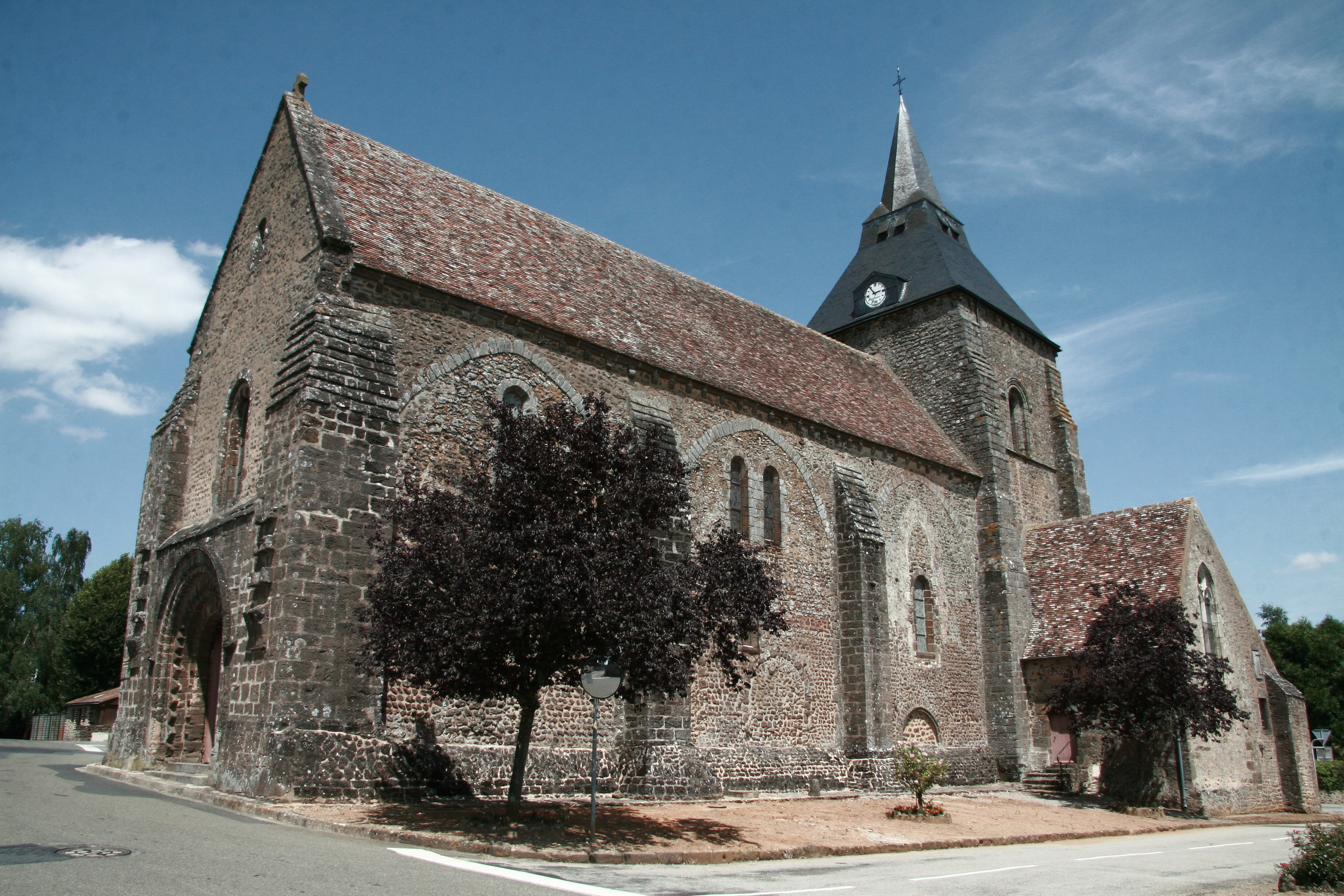
- The church of Saint Christophe, in Saint-Christophe-du-Jambet
- Location of Saint-Christophe-du-Jambet
- Location within France Location within Pays de la Loire
- Coordinates: 48°13′53″N 0°02′13″E
- Country: France
- Region: Pays de la Loire
- Department: Sarthe
- Arrondissement: Mamers
- Canton: Sillé-le-Guillaume
- Intercommunality: Haute Sarthe Alpes Mancelles

Government
  - Mayor (2020–2026): Anthony Frileux
- Area^{1}: 11.24 km^{2} (4.34 sq mi)
- Highest elevation: 192 m (630 ft)
- Lowest elevation: 62 m (203 ft)
- Population (2023): 231
  - Density: 20.6/km^{2} (53.2/sq mi)
- Time zone: UTC+01:00 (CET)
  - Summer (DST): UTC+02:00 (CEST)
- INSEE/Postal code: 72273 /72170
- ^{1} French Land Register data, which excludes lakes, ponds, glaciers > 1 km^{2} (0.386 sq mi or 247 acres) and river estuaries.

Saint-Christophe-du-Jambet is a commune in the Sarthe department in the region of Pays de la Loire in north-western France.

== See also ==
- Communes of the Sarthe department
