= Canton of Sillé-le-Guillaume =

Coordinates: 48.19°N 0.13°W

The canton of Sillé-le-Guillaume is an administrative division of the Sarthe department, northwestern France. Its borders were modified at the French canton reorganisation which came into effect in March 2015. Its seat is in Sillé-le-Guillaume.

It consists of the following communes:

1. Ancinnes
2. Assé-le-Boisne
3. Assé-le-Riboul
4. Beaumont-sur-Sarthe
5. Bérus
6. Béthon
7. Bourg-le-Roi
8. Chérancé
9. Chérisay
10. Crissé
11. Doucelles
12. Douillet
13. Fresnay-sur-Sarthe
14. Fyé
15. Gesnes-le-Gandelin
16. Grandchamp
17. Le Grez
18. Juillé
19. Livet-en-Saosnois
20. Maresché
21. Moitron-sur-Sarthe
22. Montreuil-le-Chétif
23. Mont-Saint-Jean
24. Moulins-le-Carbonnel
25. Neuvillette-en-Charnie
26. Oisseau-le-Petit
27. Parennes
28. Pezé-le-Robert
29. Piacé
30. Rouessé-Fontaine
31. Rouessé-Vassé
32. Rouez
33. Saint-Aubin-de-Locquenay
34. Saint-Christophe-du-Jambet
35. Saint-Georges-le-Gaultier
36. Saint-Léonard-des-Bois
37. Saint-Marceau
38. Saint-Ouen-de-Mimbré
39. Saint-Paul-le-Gaultier
40. Saint-Rémy-de-Sillé
41. Saint-Victeur
42. Ségrie
43. Sillé-le-Guillaume
44. Sougé-le-Ganelon
45. Thoiré-sous-Contensor
46. Le Tronchet
47. Vernie
48. Vivoin
