= Saint-Rémy-de-Sillé =

- Commune
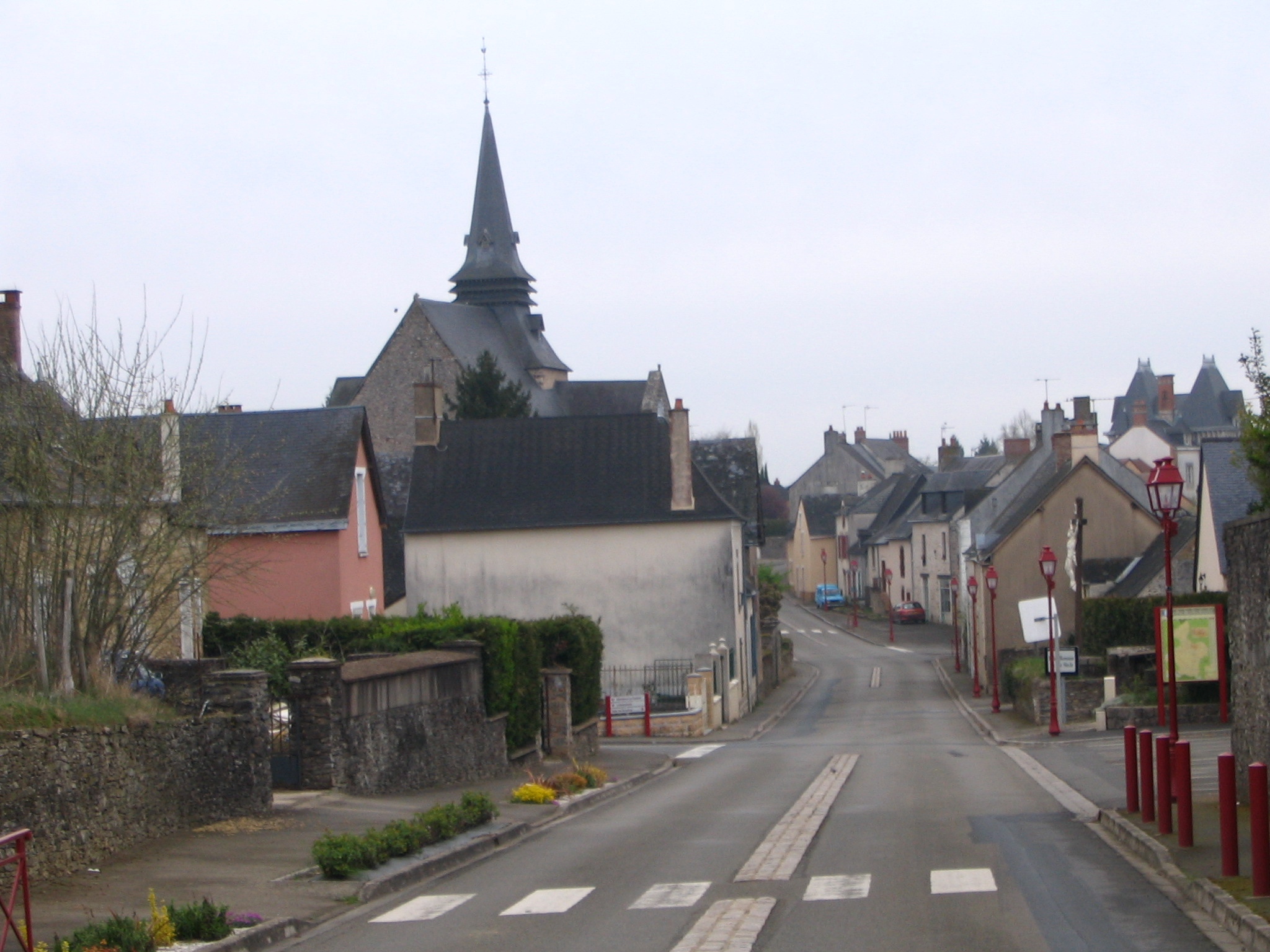
- The main road through Saint-Rémy-de-Sillé
- Location of Saint-Rémy-de-Sillé
- Location within France Location within Pays de la Loire
- Coordinates: 48°11′13″N 0°05′29″W
- Country: France
- Region: Pays de la Loire
- Department: Sarthe
- Arrondissement: Mamers
- Canton: Sillé-le-Guillaume
- Intercommunality: Champagne Conlinoise et Pays de Sillé

Government
  - Mayor (2020–2026): Alain Horpin
- Area^{1}: 11.25 km^{2} (4.34 sq mi)
- Highest elevation: 187 m (614 ft)
- Lowest elevation: 119 m (390 ft)
- Population (2023): 828
  - Density: 73.6/km^{2} (191/sq mi)
- Demonym: Saint-Rémois
- Time zone: UTC+01:00 (CET)
  - Summer (DST): UTC+02:00 (CEST)
- INSEE/Postal code: 72315 /72140
- ^{1} French Land Register data, which excludes lakes, ponds, glaciers > 1 km^{2} (0.386 sq mi or 247 acres) and river estuaries.

Saint-Rémy-de-Sillé (French pronunciation: [sɛ̃ ʁemi də sije], literally Saint-Rémy of Sillé) is a commune in the Sarthe department in the region of Pays de la Loire in north-western France.

== See also ==
- Communes of the Sarthe department
- Parc naturel régional Normandie-Maine
