= Pezé-le-Robert =

- Commune
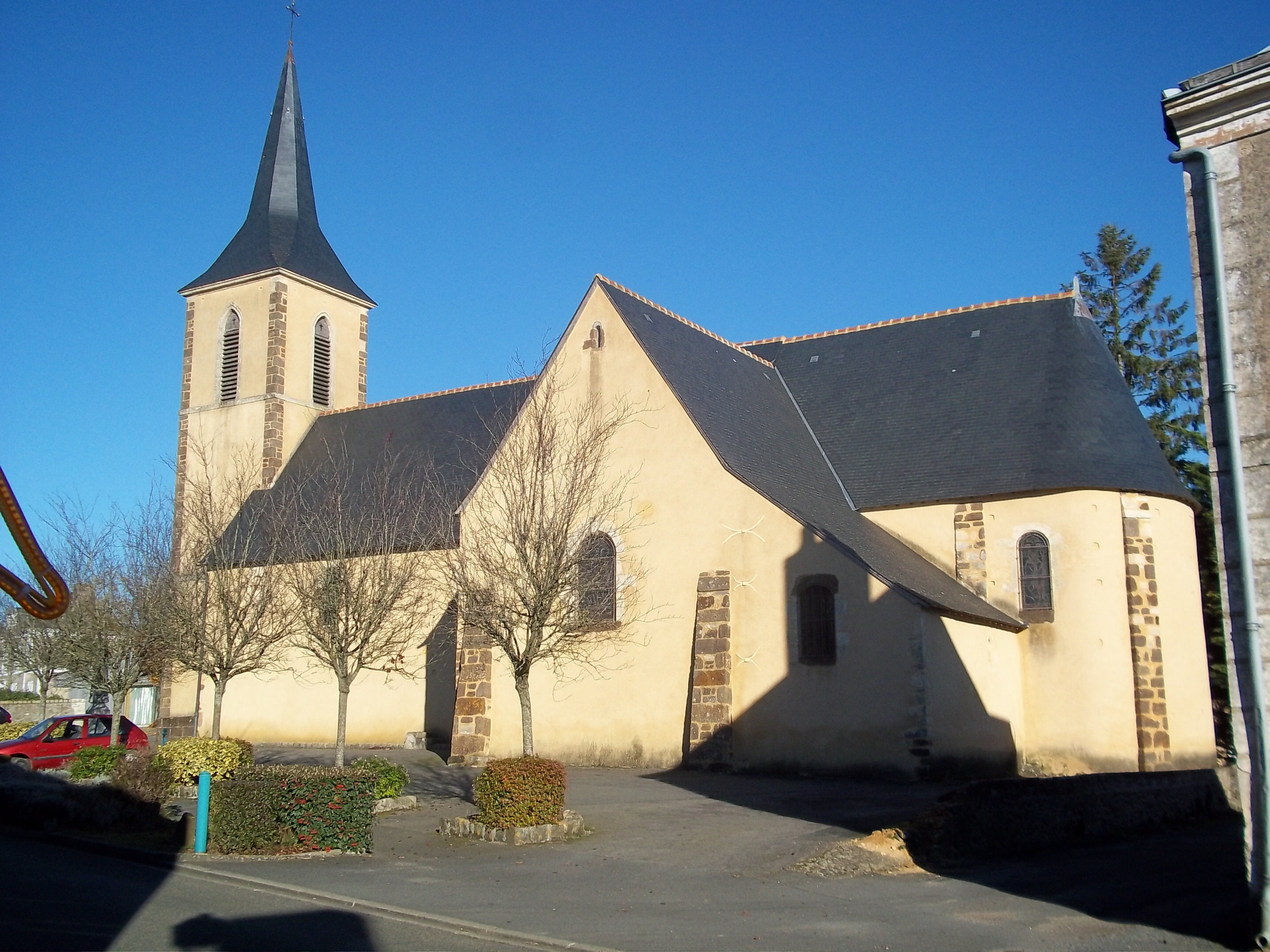
- The church of Saint-Martin, in Pezé-le-Robert
- Location of Pezé-le-Robert
- Location within France Location within Pays de la Loire
- Coordinates: 48°11′42″N 0°03′36″W
- Country: France
- Region: Pays de la Loire
- Department: Sarthe
- Arrondissement: Mamers
- Canton: Sillé-le-Guillaume
- Intercommunality: Champagne Conlinoise et Pays de Sillé

Government
  - Mayor (2020–2026): Pascal Lebreton
- Area^{1}: 16.35 km^{2} (6.31 sq mi)
- Highest elevation: 277 m (909 ft)
- Lowest elevation: 93 m (305 ft)
- Population (2023): 343
  - Density: 21.0/km^{2} (54.3/sq mi)
- Demonym(s): Pezéen, Pezéenne
- Time zone: UTC+01:00 (CET)
  - Summer (DST): UTC+02:00 (CEST)
- INSEE/Postal code: 72234 /72140
- ^{1} French Land Register data, which excludes lakes, ponds, glaciers > 1 km^{2} (0.386 sq mi or 247 acres) and river estuaries.

Pezé-le-Robert (French pronunciation: [pəze lə ʁɔbɛʁ]) is a commune in the Sarthe department in the region of Pays de la Loire in north-western France.

== See also ==
- Communes of the Sarthe department
- Parc naturel régional Normandie-Maine
