= Vernie =

- Commune
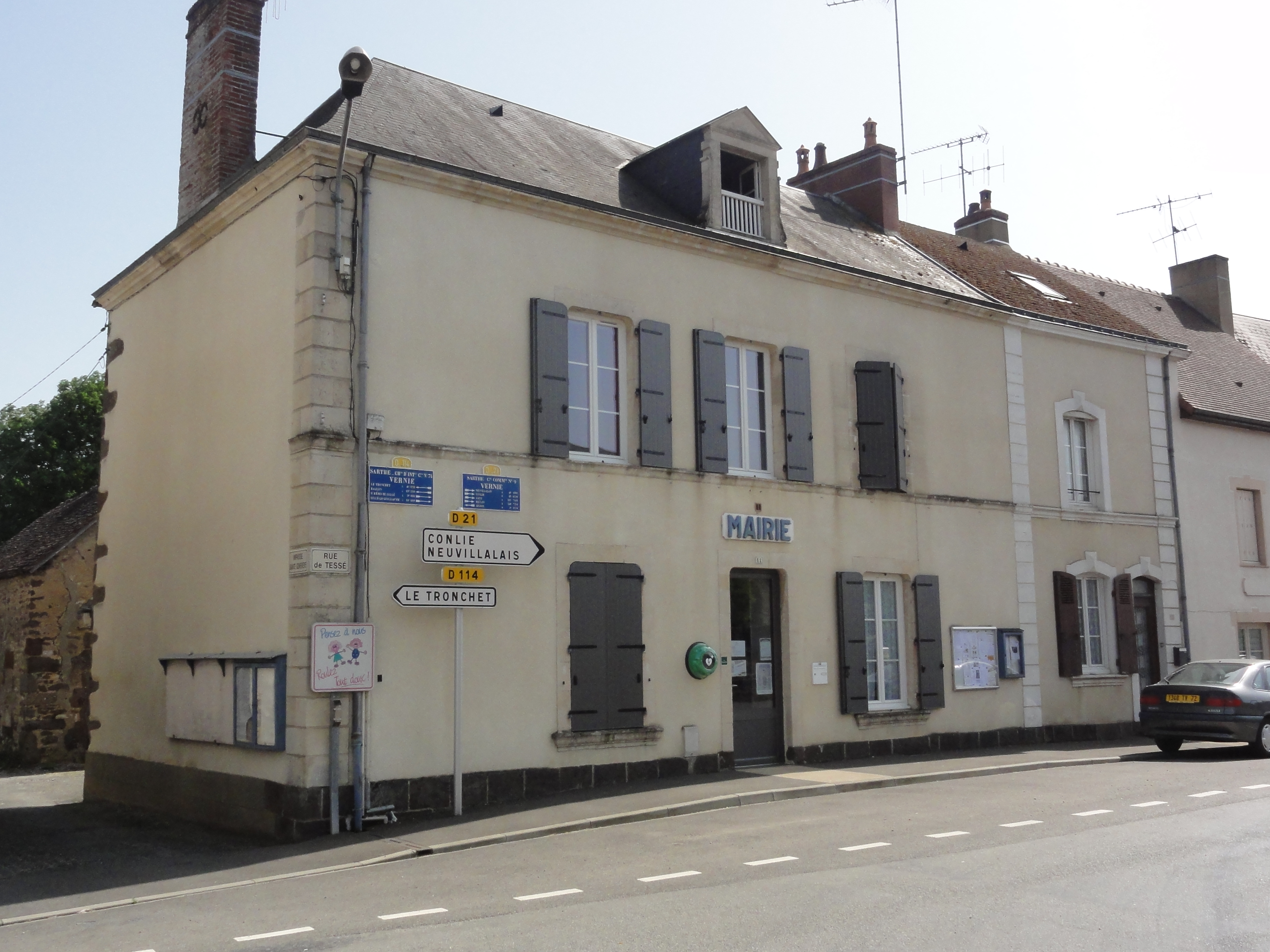
- Vernie Town hall
- Location of Vernie
- Location within France Location within Pays de la Loire
- Coordinates: 48°11′06″N 0°01′13″E
- Country: France
- Region: Pays de la Loire
- Department: Sarthe
- Arrondissement: Mamers
- Canton: Sillé-le-Guillaume
- Intercommunality: Haute Sarthe Alpes Mancelles

Government
  - Mayor (2020–2026): Jean-Marc Ragot
- Area^{1}: 10 km^{2} (3.9 sq mi)
- Population (2023): 346
  - Density: 35/km^{2} (90/sq mi)
- Time zone: UTC+01:00 (CET)
  - Summer (DST): UTC+02:00 (CEST)
- INSEE/Postal code: 72370 /72170
- ^{1} French Land Register data, which excludes lakes, ponds, glaciers > 1 km^{2} (0.386 sq mi or 247 acres) and river estuaries.

Vernie (French pronunciation: [vɛʁni]) is a commune in the Sarthe department in the region of Pays de la Loire in north-western France.

== See also ==
- Communes of the Sarthe department
