= Assé-le-Riboul =

- Commune
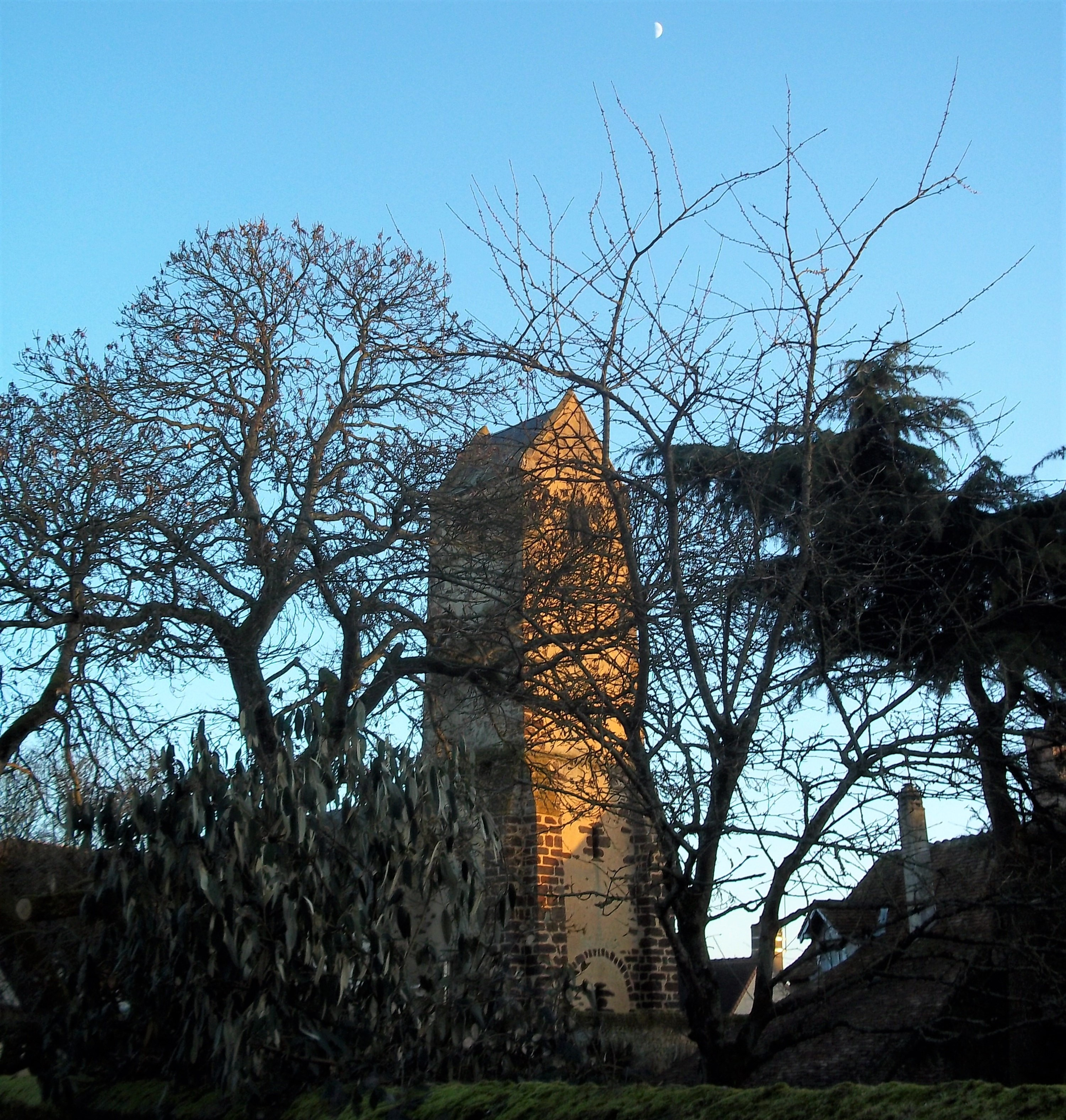
- The bell tower of the church

- Coat of arms
- Location of Assé-le-Riboul
- Location within France Location within Pays de la Loire
- Coordinates: 48°11′41″N 0°05′14″E
- Country: France
- Region: Pays de la Loire
- Department: Sarthe
- Arrondissement: Mamers
- Canton: Sillé-le-Guillaume
- Intercommunality: CC Haute Sarthe Alpes Mancelles

Government
  - Mayor (2020–2026): Martine Leballeur
- Area^{1}: 16.77 km^{2} (6.47 sq mi)
- Highest elevation: 138 m (453 ft)
- Lowest elevation: 57 m (187 ft)
- Population (2023): 479
  - Density: 28.6/km^{2} (74.0/sq mi)
- Demonym(s): Asséen, Asséenne
- Time zone: UTC+01:00 (CET)
  - Summer (DST): UTC+02:00 (CEST)
- INSEE/Postal code: 72012 /72170
- ^{1} French Land Register data, which excludes lakes, ponds, glaciers > 1 km^{2} (0.386 sq mi or 247 acres) and river estuaries.

Assé-le-Riboul (French pronunciation: [ase lə ʁibul]) is a commune in the Sarthe department in the region of Pays de la Loire in north-western France.

== See also ==
- Communes of the Sarthe department
