= Maresché =

- Commune
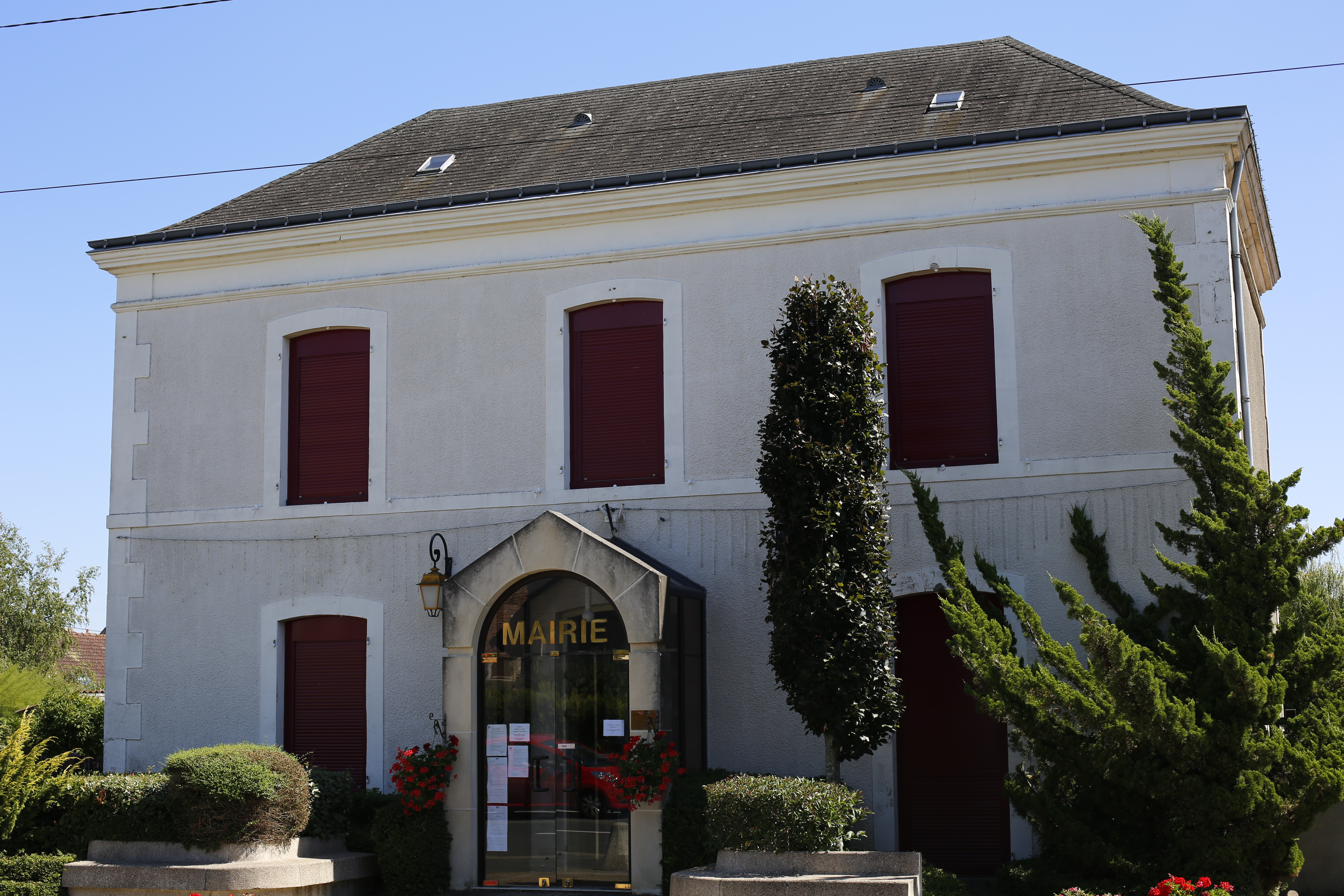
- The town hall of Maresché

- Coat of arms
- Location of Maresché
- Location within France Location within Pays de la Loire
- Coordinates: 48°12′43″N 0°09′14″E
- Country: France
- Region: Pays de la Loire
- Department: Sarthe
- Arrondissement: Mamers
- Canton: Sillé-le-Guillaume
- Intercommunality: Haute Sarthe Alpes Mancelles

Government
  - Mayor (2020–2026): Armelle Reignier
- Area^{1}: 14.9 km^{2} (5.8 sq mi)
- Population (2023): 876
  - Density: 58.8/km^{2} (152/sq mi)
- Demonym(s): Mareschéen, Mareschéenne
- Time zone: UTC+01:00 (CET)
  - Summer (DST): UTC+02:00 (CEST)
- INSEE/Postal code: 72186 /72170
- ^{1} French Land Register data, which excludes lakes, ponds, glaciers > 1 km^{2} (0.386 sq mi or 247 acres) and river estuaries.

Maresché (French pronunciation: [maʁɛʃe]) is a commune in the Sarthe department in the region of Pays de la Loire in north-western France.

== See also ==
- Communes of the Sarthe department
