= Rouessé-Fontaine =

- Commune
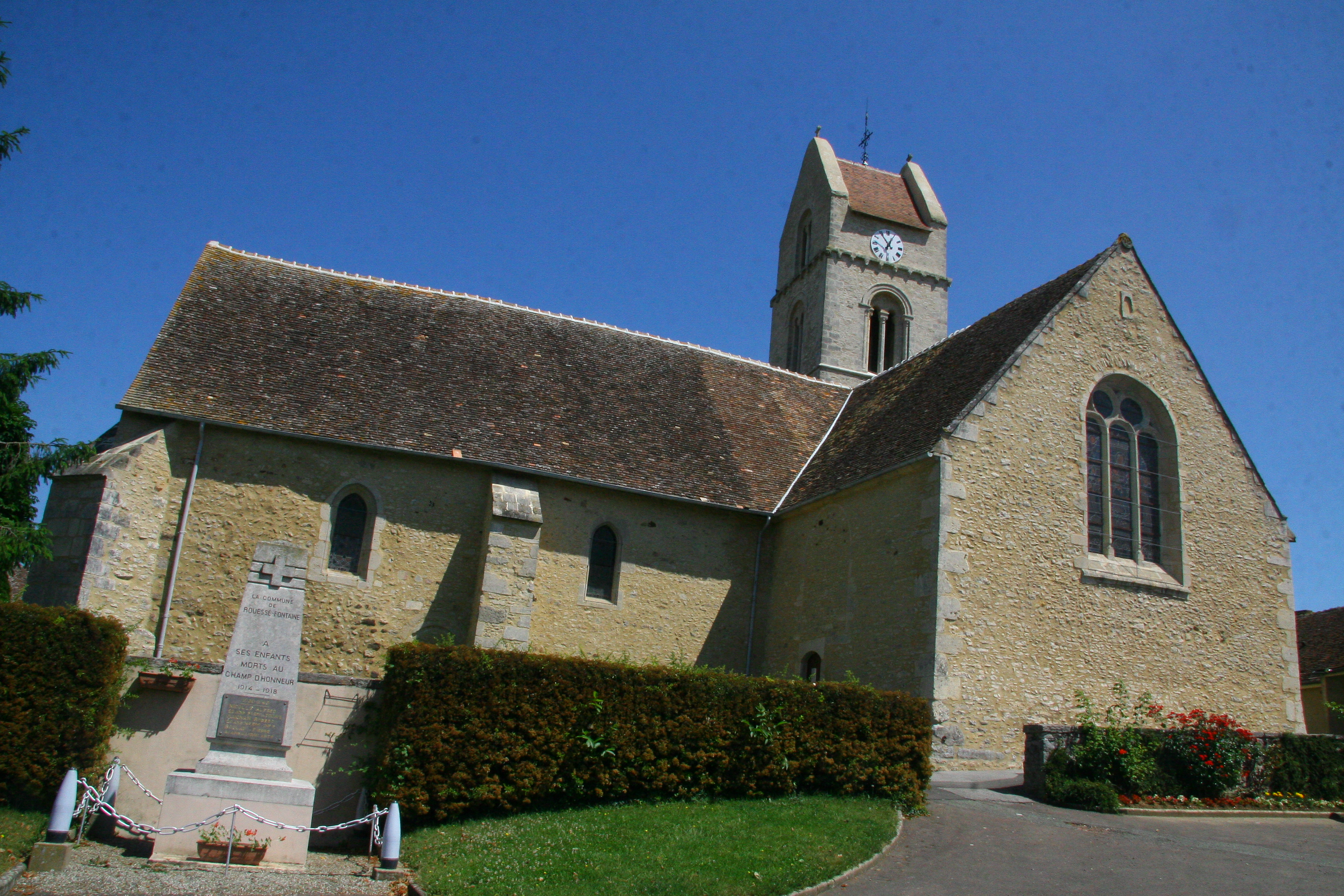
- The church of Saint Hermès, in Rouessé-Fontaine
- Location of Rouessé-Fontaine
- Location within France Location within Pays de la Loire
- Coordinates: 48°19′24″N 0°09′06″E
- Country: France
- Region: Pays de la Loire
- Department: Sarthe
- Arrondissement: Mamers
- Canton: Sillé-le-Guillaume
- Intercommunality: Haute Sarthe Alpes Mancelles

Government
  - Mayor (2020–2026): Patrick Palmas
- Area^{1}: 12.48 km^{2} (4.82 sq mi)
- Highest elevation: 147 m (482 ft)
- Lowest elevation: 82 m (269 ft)
- Population (2023): 261
  - Density: 20.9/km^{2} (54.2/sq mi)
- Demonym: Rousséens
- Time zone: UTC+01:00 (CET)
  - Summer (DST): UTC+02:00 (CEST)
- INSEE/Postal code: 72254 /72610
- ^{1} French Land Register data, which excludes lakes, ponds, glaciers > 1 km^{2} (0.386 sq mi or 247 acres) and river estuaries.

Rouessé-Fontaine (French pronunciation: [ʁwɛse fɔ̃tɛn]) is a commune in the Sarthe department in the region of Pays de la Loire in north-western France.

== Geography ==
The La Semelle river runs through the commune.

== Points of Interest ==
=== National Heritage sites ===
The Commune has a total of 2 buildings and areas listed as a Monument historique:

- Église Saint-Hermès de Rouessé-Fontaine - church that was listed as a monument historique in 1914.
- Prieuré Saint-Augustin - a fifteenth century Priory which was listed as a monument historique in 1974.

== See also ==
- Communes of the Sarthe department
