= Assé-le-Boisne =

- Commune
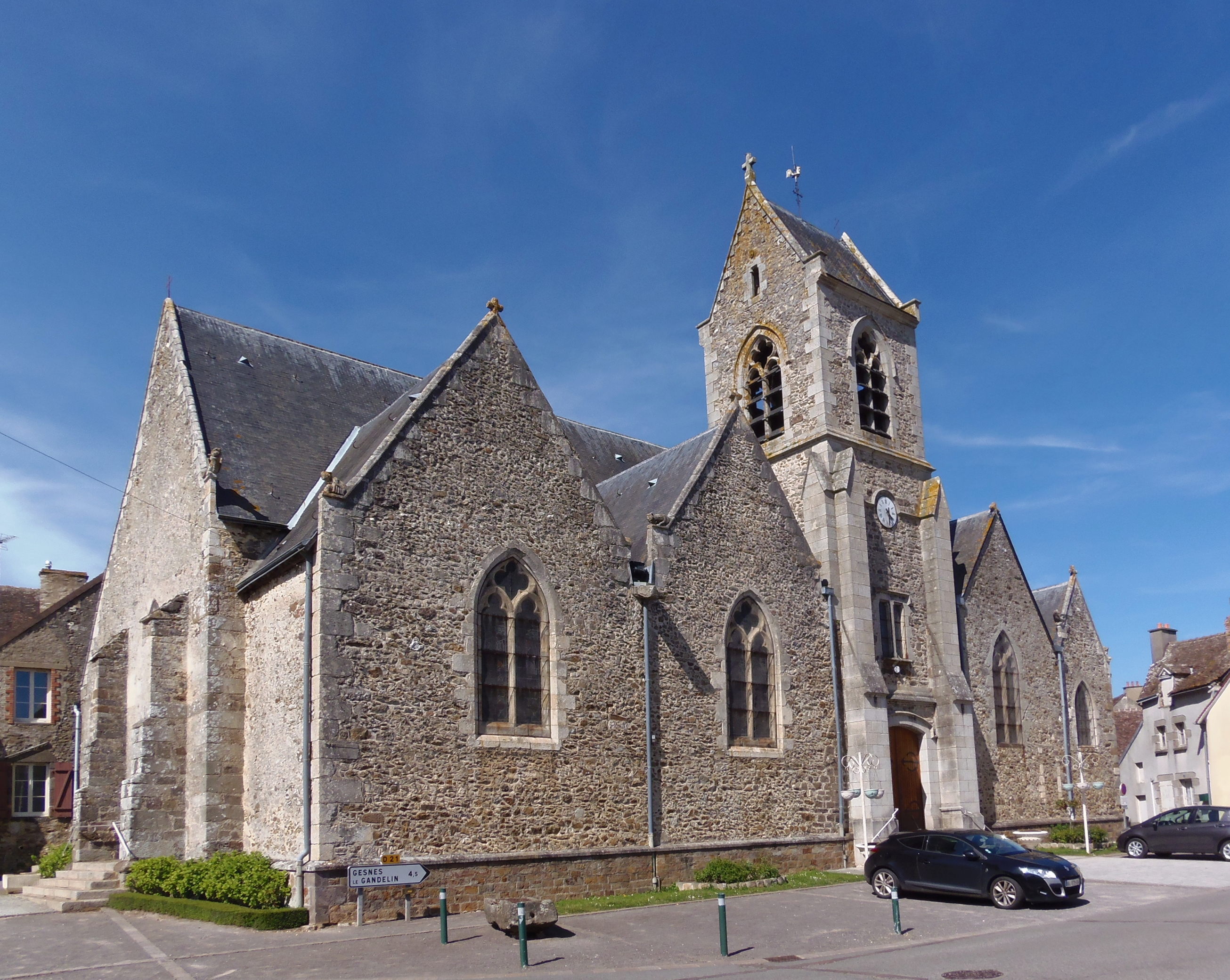
- The church of Notre-Dame
- Location of Assé-le-Boisne
- Location within France Location within Pays de la Loire
- Coordinates: 48°19′24″N 0°00′28″W
- Country: France
- Region: Pays de la Loire
- Department: Sarthe
- Arrondissement: Mamers
- Canton: Sillé-le-Guillaume
- Intercommunality: CC Haute Sarthe Alpes Mancelles

Government
  - Mayor (2020–2026): Jean-Louis Breton
- Area^{1}: 28.39 km^{2} (10.96 sq mi)
- Highest elevation: 213 m (699 ft)
- Lowest elevation: 69 m (226 ft)
- Population (2023): 881
  - Density: 31.0/km^{2} (80.4/sq mi)
- Demonym: Asséboliens ou Asséens
- Time zone: UTC+01:00 (CET)
  - Summer (DST): UTC+02:00 (CEST)
- INSEE/Postal code: 72011 /72130
- ^{1} French Land Register data, which excludes lakes, ponds, glaciers > 1 km^{2} (0.386 sq mi or 247 acres) and river estuaries.

Assé-le-Boisne (French pronunciation: [ase lə bwan]) is a commune in the Sarthe department in the region of Pays de la Loire in north-western France.

== See also ==
- Communes of the Sarthe department
- Parc naturel régional Normandie-Maine
