= Saint-Victeur =

- Commune
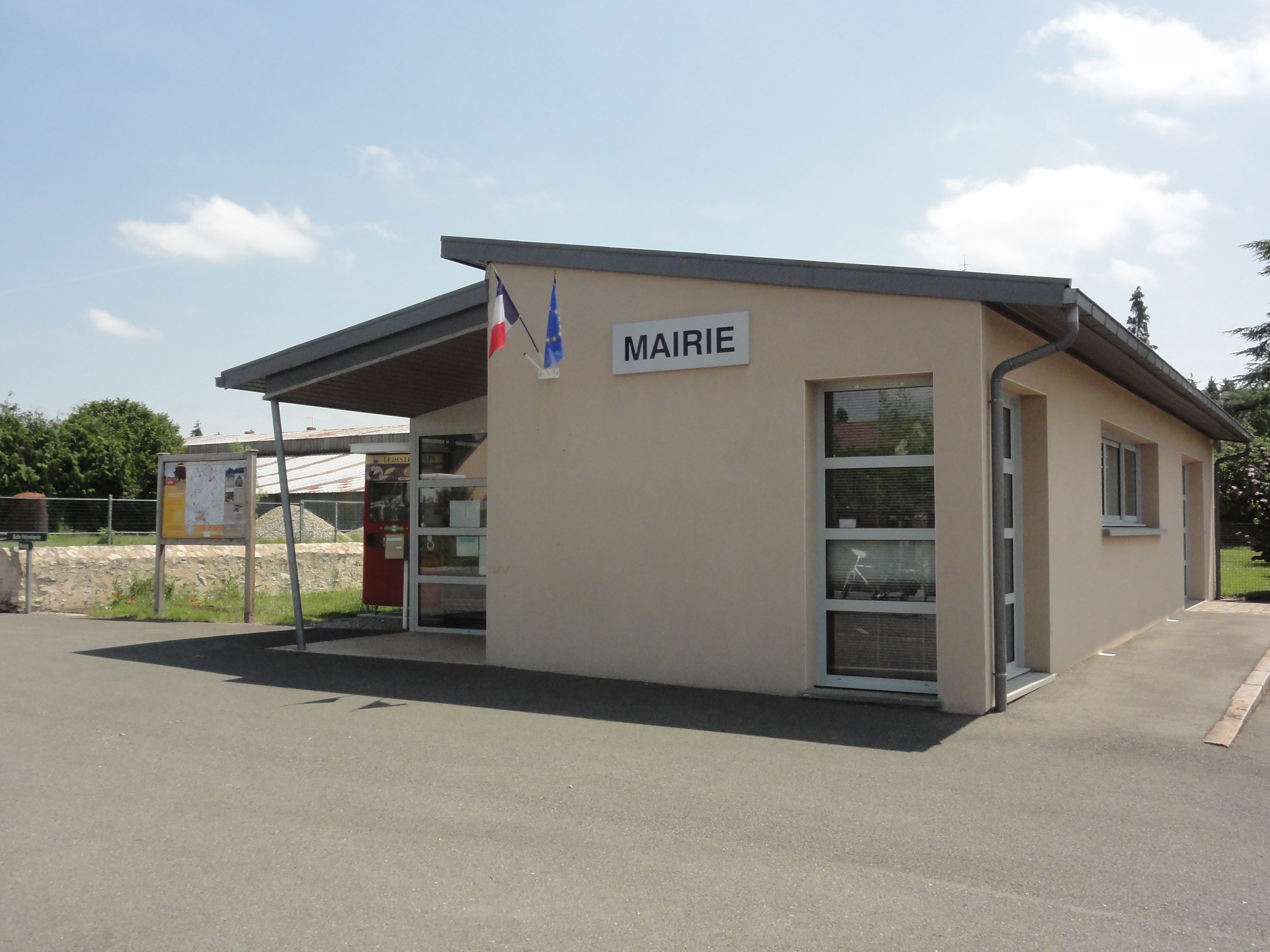
- Saint-Victeur Town hall
- Location of Saint-Victeur
- Location within France Location within Pays de la Loire
- Coordinates: 48°19′21″N 0°02′21″E
- Country: France
- Region: Pays de la Loire
- Department: Sarthe
- Arrondissement: Mamers
- Canton: Sillé-le-Guillaume
- Intercommunality: Haute Sarthe Alpes Mancelles

Government
  - Mayor (2020–2026): Jean Ledoux
- Area^{1}: 7.06 km^{2} (2.73 sq mi)
- Highest elevation: 167 m (548 ft)
- Lowest elevation: 89 m (292 ft)
- Population (2023): 432
  - Density: 61.2/km^{2} (158/sq mi)
- Time zone: UTC+01:00 (CET)
  - Summer (DST): UTC+02:00 (CEST)
- INSEE/Postal code: 72323 /72130
- ^{1} French Land Register data, which excludes lakes, ponds, glaciers > 1 km^{2} (0.386 sq mi or 247 acres) and river estuaries.

Saint-Victeur is a commune in the Sarthe department in the region of Pays de la Loire in north-western France.

== Geography ==
The commune is made up of the following collection of villages and hamlets, Le Bois Cochin and Saint-Victeur.

== See also ==
- Communes of the Sarthe department
