= Doucelles =

- Commune
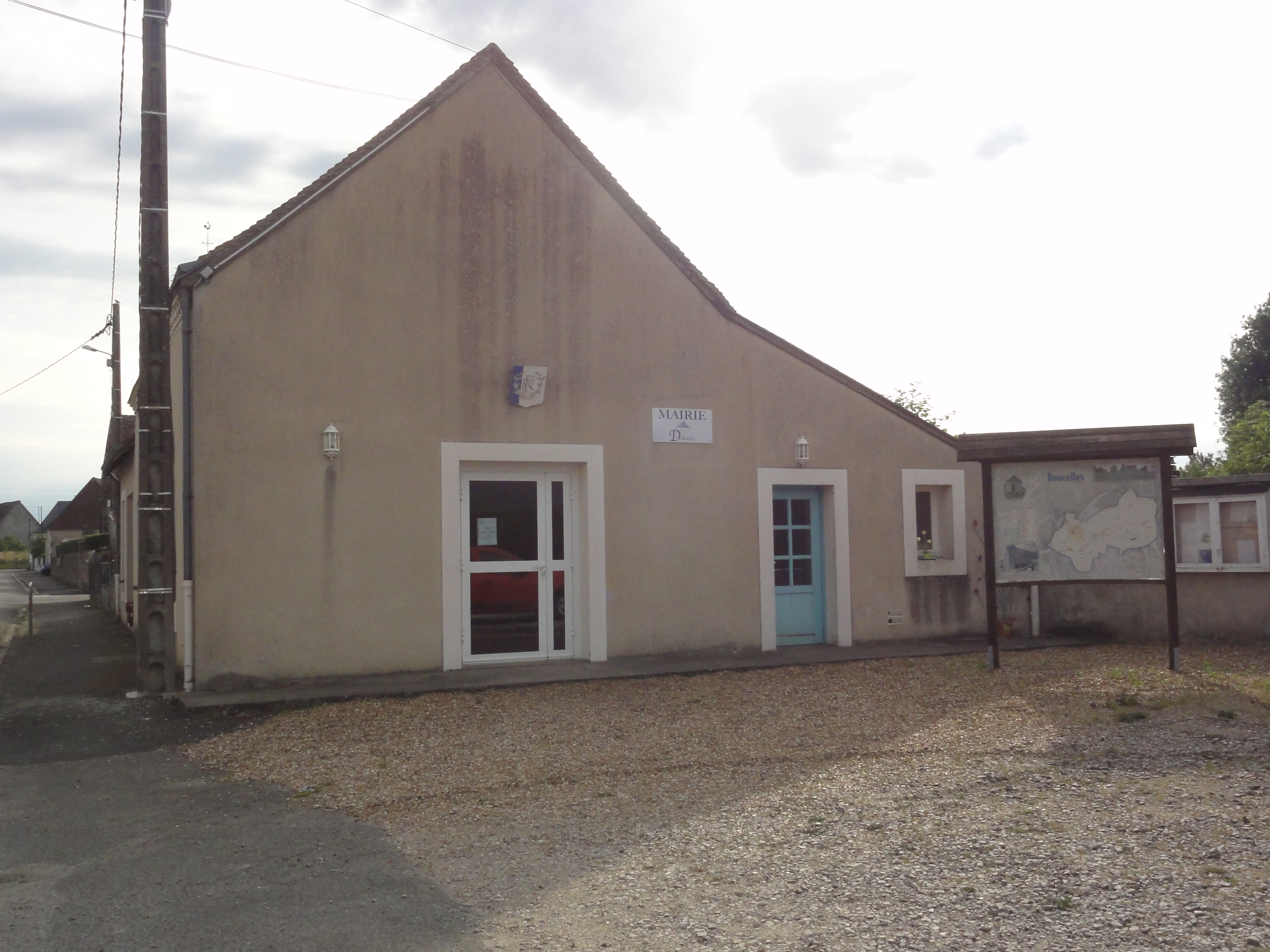
- Doucelles Town hall
- Location of Doucelles
- Location within France Location within Pays de la Loire
- Coordinates: 48°15′23″N 0°10′07″E
- Country: France
- Region: Pays de la Loire
- Department: Sarthe
- Arrondissement: Mamers
- Canton: Sillé-le-Guillaume
- Intercommunality: Haute Sarthe Alpes Mancelles

Government
  - Mayor (2020–2026): Pascal Chesneau
- Area^{1}: 4.48 km^{2} (1.73 sq mi)
- Highest elevation: 86 m (282 ft)
- Lowest elevation: 67 m (220 ft)
- Population (2023): 223
  - Density: 49.8/km^{2} (129/sq mi)
- Demonym(s): Doucellois, Doucelloise
- Time zone: UTC+01:00 (CET)
  - Summer (DST): UTC+02:00 (CEST)
- INSEE/Postal code: 72120 /72170
- ^{1} French Land Register data, which excludes lakes, ponds, glaciers > 1 km^{2} (0.386 sq mi or 247 acres) and river estuaries.

Doucelles (French pronunciation: [dusɛl]) is a commune in the Sarthe department in the Pays de la Loire region in north-western France.

== See also ==
- Communes of the Sarthe department
