= Saint-Ouen-de-Mimbré =

- Commune
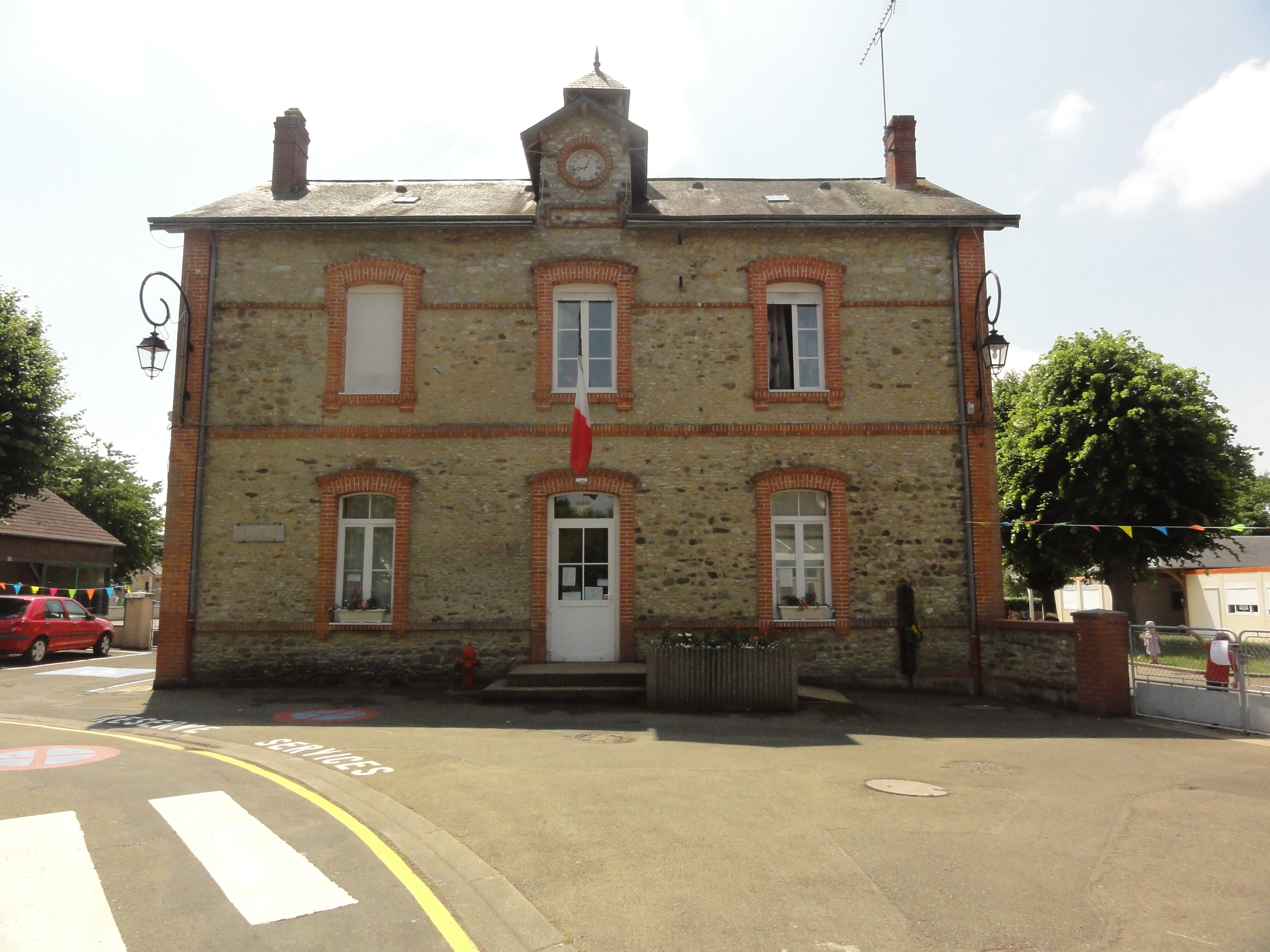
- Saint-Ouen-de-Mimbré Town hall

- Coat of arms
- Location of Saint-Ouen-de-Mimbré
- Location within France Location within Pays de la Loire
- Coordinates: 48°17′39″N 0°02′55″E
- Country: France
- Region: Pays de la Loire
- Department: Sarthe
- Arrondissement: Mamers
- Canton: Sillé-le-Guillaume
- Intercommunality: Haute Sarthe Alpes Mancelles

Government
  - Mayor (2020–2026): Jean-Louis Clément
- Area^{1}: 10.63 km^{2} (4.10 sq mi)
- Highest elevation: 106 m (348 ft)
- Lowest elevation: 73 m (240 ft)
- Population (2023): 901
  - Density: 84.8/km^{2} (220/sq mi)
- Demonym: Avoisiens
- Time zone: UTC+01:00 (CET)
  - Summer (DST): UTC+02:00 (CEST)
- INSEE/Postal code: 72305 /72130
- ^{1} French Land Register data, which excludes lakes, ponds, glaciers > 1 km^{2} (0.386 sq mi or 247 acres) and river estuaries.

Saint-Ouen-de-Mimbré (French pronunciation: [sɛ̃.t‿wɛ̃ də mɛ̃bʁe]) is a commune in the Sarthe department in the region of Pays de la Loire in north-western France.

== See also ==
- Communes of the Sarthe department
