= Gesnes-le-Gandelin =

- Commune
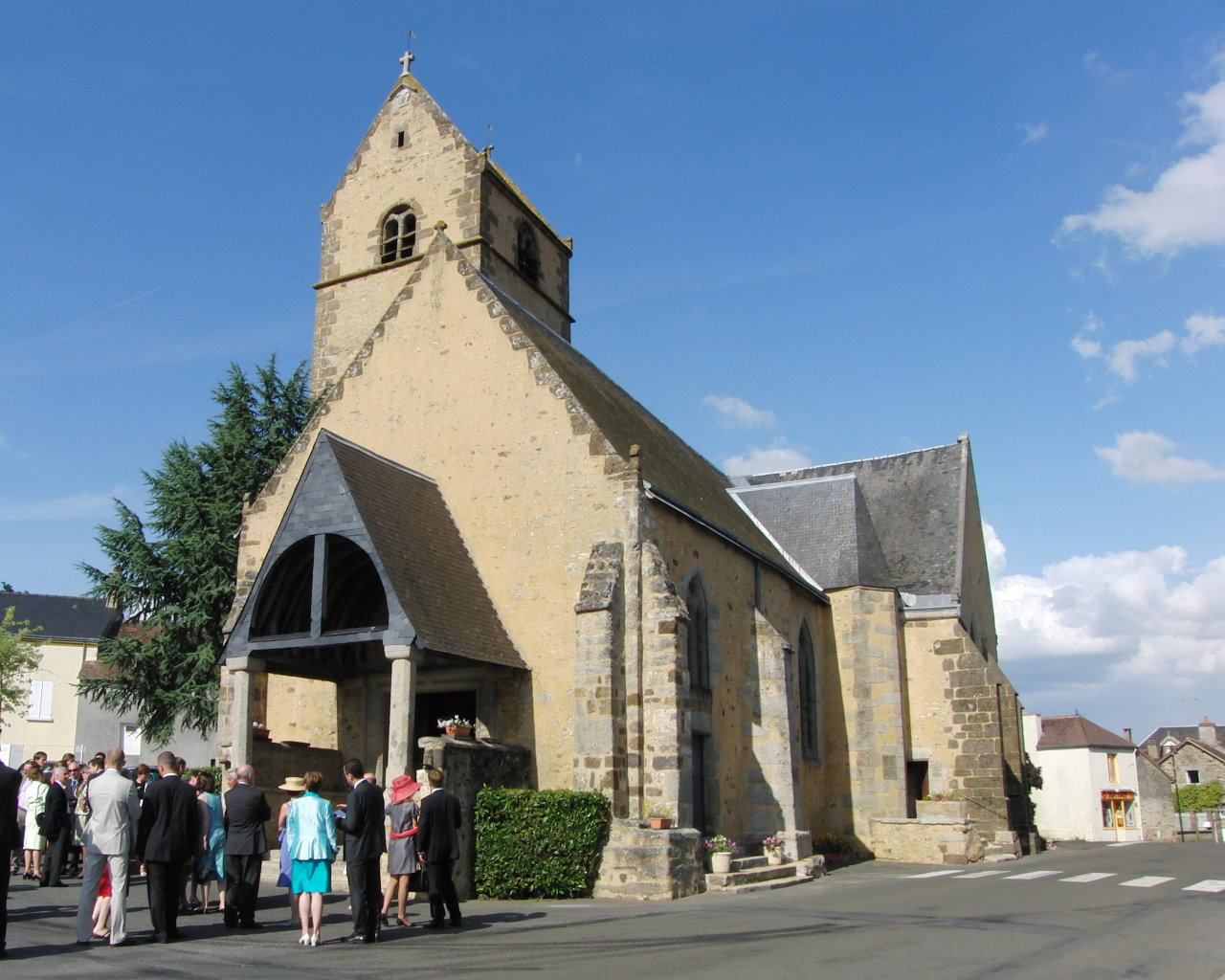
- The church of Saint-Pierre

- Coat of arms
- Location of Gesnes-le-Gandelin
- Location within France Location within Pays de la Loire
- Coordinates: 48°21′00″N 0°01′00″E
- Country: France
- Region: Pays de la Loire
- Department: Sarthe
- Arrondissement: Mamers
- Canton: Sillé-le-Guillaume
- Intercommunality: Haute Sarthe Alpes Mancelles

Government
  - Mayor (2020–2026): Georges Pavard
- Area^{1}: 12.88 km^{2} (4.97 sq mi)
- Highest elevation: 200 m (660 ft)
- Lowest elevation: 114 m (374 ft)
- Population (2023): 879
  - Density: 68.2/km^{2} (177/sq mi)
- Demonym: Gesnois
- Time zone: UTC+01:00 (CET)
  - Summer (DST): UTC+02:00 (CEST)
- INSEE/Postal code: 72141 /72130
- ^{1} French Land Register data, which excludes lakes, ponds, glaciers > 1 km^{2} (0.386 sq mi or 247 acres) and river estuaries.

Gesnes-le-Gandelin (French pronunciation: [ʒɛn lə ɡɑ̃dlɛ̃]) is a commune in the Sarthe department in the region of Pays de la Loire in north-western France.

== Geography ==
The commune is made up of the following collection of villages and hamlets, Les Rablais, Le Mortier, Le Talus, Gesnes-le-Gandelin, La Rouabière, La Tahérie and Château de Vaux.

== Points of Interest ==
=== National Heritage sites ===
The Commune has a total of 2 buildings and areas listed as a Monument historique:

- Saint-Pierre de Gesnes-le-Gandelin - church that was listed as a monument historique in 1927.
- Camp de Saint-Evroult - a Gallo-Roman Oppidum which was listed as a monument historique in 1982.

== See also ==
- Communes of the Sarthe department
