= Chérisay =

- Commune
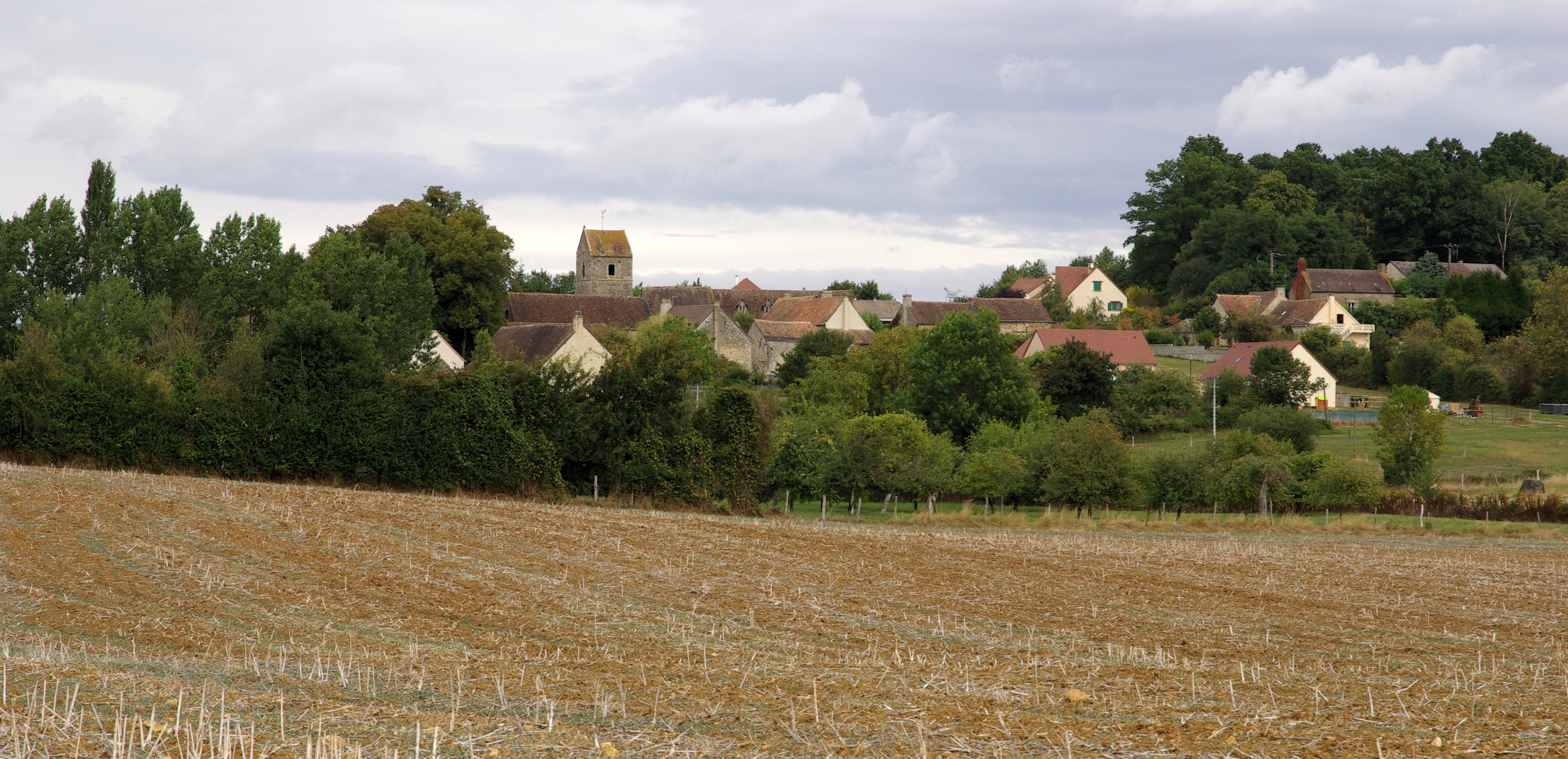
- A general view of Chérisay

- Coat of arms
- Location of Chérisay
- Location within France Location within Pays de la Loire
- Coordinates: 48°21′16″N 0°06′39″E
- Country: France
- Region: Pays de la Loire
- Department: Sarthe
- Arrondissement: Mamers
- Canton: Sillé-le-Guillaume
- Intercommunality: Haute Sarthe Alpes Mancelles

Government
  - Mayor (2020–2026): Nicolas Latacz
- Area^{1}: 7.9 km^{2} (3.1 sq mi)
- Highest elevation: 152 m (499 ft)
- Lowest elevation: 89 m (292 ft)
- Population (2023): 303
  - Density: 38/km^{2} (99/sq mi)
- Time zone: UTC+01:00 (CET)
  - Summer (DST): UTC+02:00 (CEST)
- INSEE/Postal code: 72079 /72610
- ^{1} French Land Register data, which excludes lakes, ponds, glaciers > 1 km^{2} (0.386 sq mi or 247 acres) and river estuaries.

Chérisay (French pronunciation: [ʃeʁizɛ]) is a commune in the Sarthe department in the Pays de la Loire region in north-western France.

== Geography ==
The commune is made up of the following collection of villages and hamlets, Chérisay, Rabours, Les Ragottières and Le Coudray.

== See also ==
- Communes of the Sarthe department
