= Saint-Aubin-de-Locquenay =

- Commune
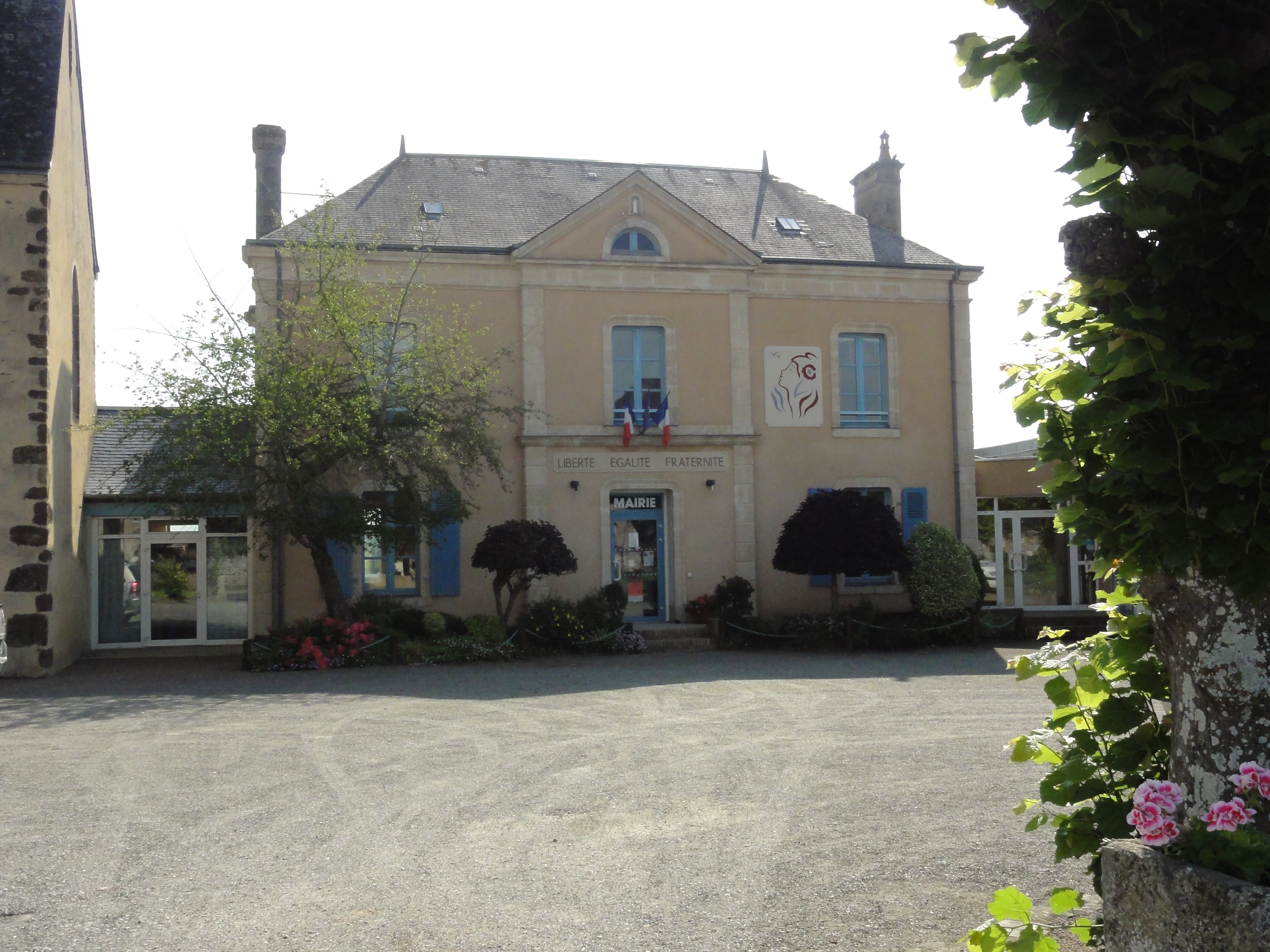
- Saint-Aubin-de-Locquenay Town hall
- Location of Saint-Aubin-de-Locquenay
- Location within France Location within Pays de la Loire
- Coordinates: 48°16′13″N 0°01′30″E
- Country: France
- Region: Pays de la Loire
- Department: Sarthe
- Arrondissement: Mamers
- Canton: Sillé-le-Guillaume
- Intercommunality: Haute Sarthe Alpes Mancelles

Government
  - Mayor (2020–2026): Frédéric Cosson
- Area^{1}: 17.50 km^{2} (6.76 sq mi)
- Highest elevation: 196 m (643 ft)
- Lowest elevation: 65 m (213 ft)
- Population (2023): 761
  - Density: 43.5/km^{2} (113/sq mi)
- Demonym: Saint-Aubinois
- Time zone: UTC+01:00 (CET)
  - Summer (DST): UTC+02:00 (CEST)
- INSEE/Postal code: 72266 /72130
- ^{1} French Land Register data, which excludes lakes, ponds, glaciers > 1 km^{2} (0.386 sq mi or 247 acres) and river estuaries.

Saint-Aubin-de-Locquenay (French pronunciation: [sɛ̃.t‿obɛ̃ də lɔknɛ]) is a commune in the Sarthe department in the region of Pays de la Loire in north-western France.

== See also ==
- Communes of the Sarthe department
