= Saint-Georges-le-Gaultier =

- Commune
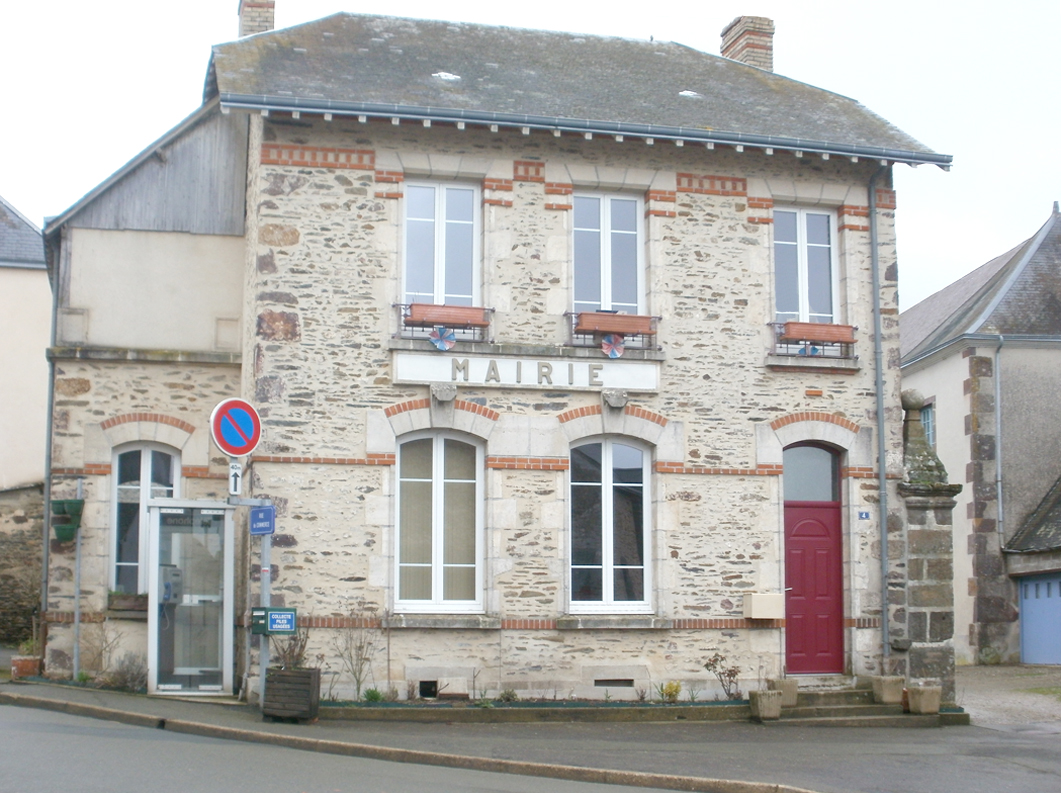
- The town hall of Saint-Georges-le-Gaultier
- Location of Saint-Georges-le-Gaultier
- Location within France Location within Pays de la Loire
- Coordinates: 48°17′52″N 0°06′25″W
- Country: France
- Region: Pays de la Loire
- Department: Sarthe
- Arrondissement: Mamers
- Canton: Sillé-le-Guillaume
- Intercommunality: Haute Sarthe Alpes Mancelles

Government
  - Mayor (2020–2026): Jean-Luc Tessier
- Area^{1}: 23.36 km^{2} (9.02 sq mi)
- Highest elevation: 174 m (571 ft)
- Lowest elevation: 84 m (276 ft)
- Population (2023): 517
  - Density: 22.1/km^{2} (57.3/sq mi)
- Demonym: Saint-Georgiens
- Time zone: UTC+01:00 (CET)
  - Summer (DST): UTC+02:00 (CEST)
- INSEE/Postal code: 72282 /72590 - 72130
- ^{1} French Land Register data, which excludes lakes, ponds, glaciers > 1 km^{2} (0.386 sq mi or 247 acres) and river estuaries.

Saint-Georges-le-Gaultier is a commune in the Sarthe department in the region of Pays de la Loire in north-western France.

== See also ==
- Communes of the Sarthe department
- Parc naturel régional Normandie-Maine
