= Le Grez =

- Commune
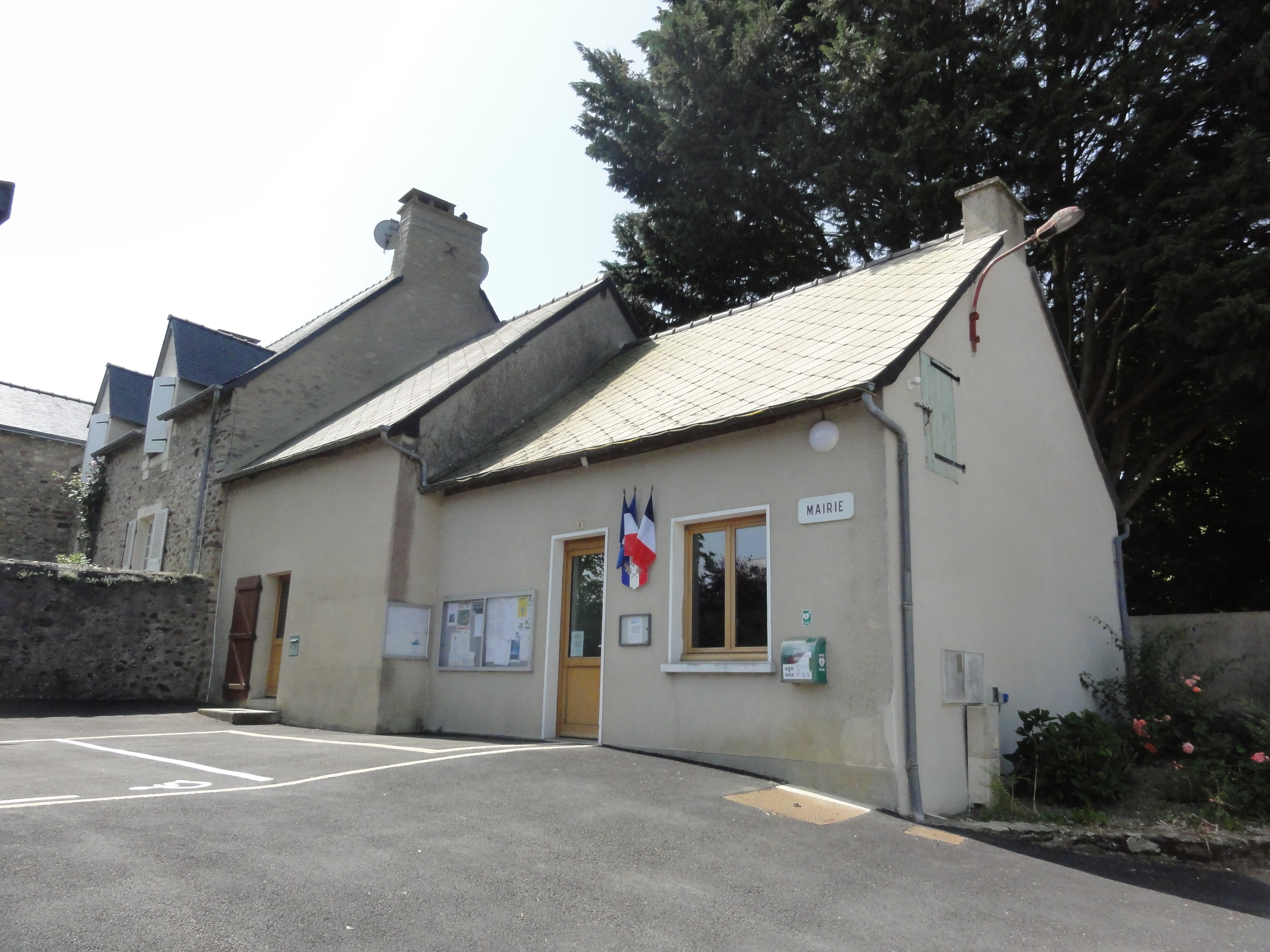
- Le Grez Town hall
- Location of Le Grez
- Location within France Location within Pays de la Loire
- Coordinates: 48°11′27″N 0°09′02″W
- Country: France
- Region: Pays de la Loire
- Department: Sarthe
- Arrondissement: Mamers
- Canton: Sillé-le-Guillaume
- Intercommunality: Champagne Conlinoise et Pays de Sillé

Government
  - Mayor (2020–2026): Martine Cottin
- Area^{1}: 7.40 km^{2} (2.86 sq mi)
- Highest elevation: 266 m (873 ft)
- Lowest elevation: 140 m (460 ft)
- Population (2023): 380
  - Density: 51/km^{2} (130/sq mi)
- Time zone: UTC+01:00 (CET)
  - Summer (DST): UTC+02:00 (CEST)
- INSEE/Postal code: 72145 /72140
- ^{1} French Land Register data, which excludes lakes, ponds, glaciers > 1 km^{2} (0.386 sq mi or 247 acres) and river estuaries.

Le Grez (French pronunciation: [lə ɡʁe]) is a commune in the Sarthe department in the region of Pays de la Loire in north-western France.

== See also ==
- Communes of the Sarthe department
- Parc naturel régional Normandie-Maine
