= Neuvillette-en-Charnie =

- Commune
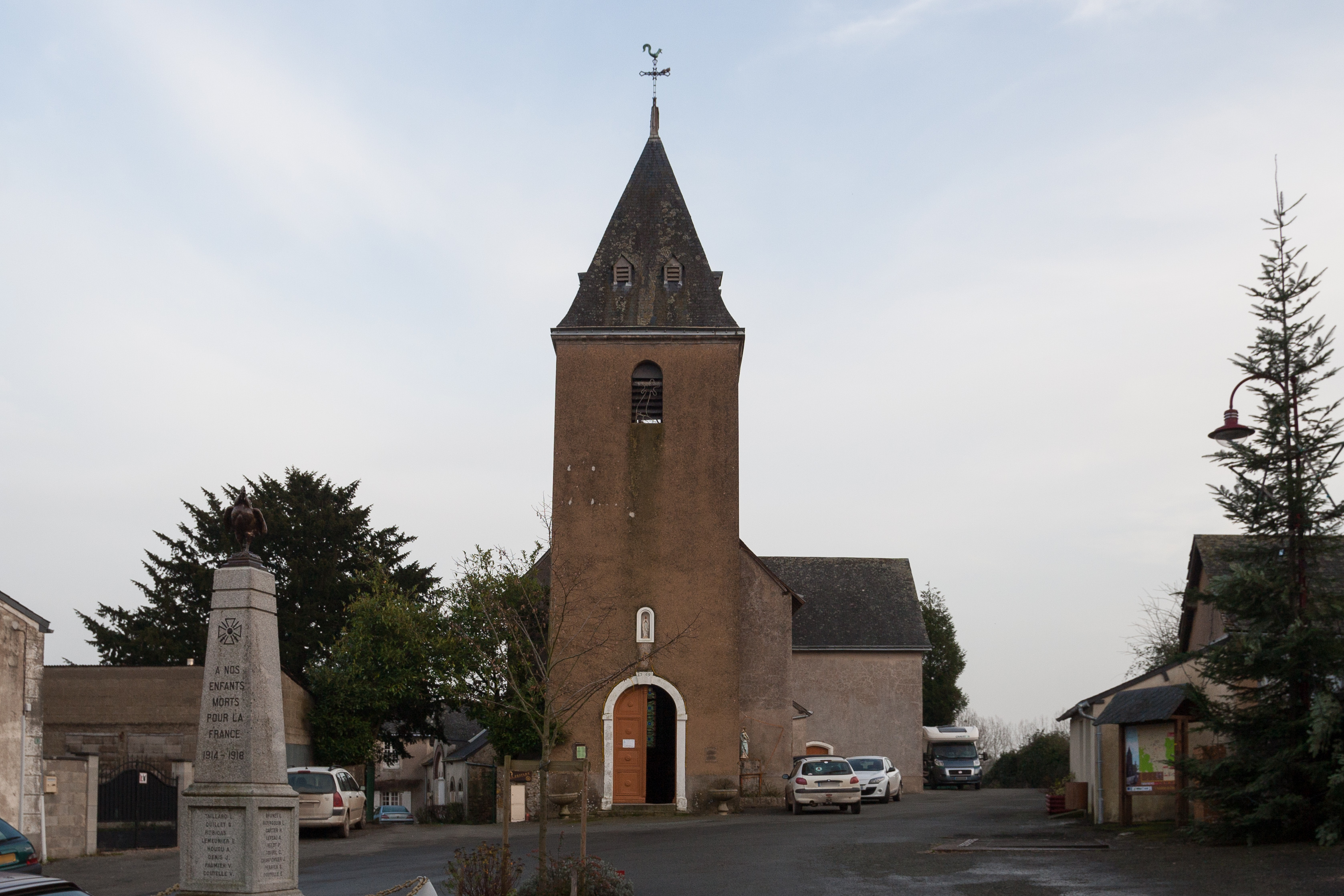
- The church of Saint-Gemme, in Neuvillette-en-Charnie
- Location of Neuvillette-en-Charnie
- Location within France Location within Pays de la Loire
- Coordinates: 48°05′36″N 0°12′39″W
- Country: France
- Region: Pays de la Loire
- Department: Sarthe
- Arrondissement: Mamers
- Canton: Sillé-le-Guillaume
- Intercommunality: Champagne Conlinoise et Pays de Sillé

Government
  - Mayor (2020–2026): Jean-Paul Brochard
- Area^{1}: 14.7 km^{2} (5.7 sq mi)
- Highest elevation: 235 m (771 ft)
- Lowest elevation: 113 m (371 ft)
- Population (2023): 305
  - Density: 20.7/km^{2} (53.7/sq mi)
- Time zone: UTC+01:00 (CET)
  - Summer (DST): UTC+02:00 (CEST)
- INSEE/Postal code: 72218 /72140
- ^{1} French Land Register data, which excludes lakes, ponds, glaciers > 1 km^{2} (0.386 sq mi or 247 acres) and river estuaries.

Neuvillette-en-Charnie (French pronunciation: [nøvilɛt ɑ̃ ʃaʁni]) is a commune in the Sarthe department in the region of Pays de la Loire in north-western France.

== See also ==
- Communes of the Sarthe department
