= José Matías Grez =

Chilean politician

José Matías Grez y Ubeda (1766–1840) was a Chilean politician, mayor of Rancagua between 1804 and 1805. Born in Santiago to Juan Antonio Grez y Díaz-Pimienta and Manuela Josefa Ubeda y Vélez, Grez was educated at the Seminary of Santiago (Seminario de Santiago). He married Mercedes Fontecilla Valenzuela in 1800, with whom he had no children.

Political offices
Preceded by Pedro Antonio Baeza y Besoaín	Mayor of Rancagua; 1804–1805	Succeeded by Pablo de Mendoza y Merino
