= Longnes =

Longnes may refer to the following places in France:

- Longnes, Sarthe, a commune in the Sarthe department
- Longnes, Yvelines, a commune in the Yvelines department
