= Auvers =

Auvers may refer to the following communes in France:

- Auvers, Haute-Loire
- Auvers, Manche
- Auvers-le-Hamon, in the Sarthe département
- Auvers-Saint-Georges, in the Essonne département
- Auvers-sous-Montfaucon, in the Sarthe département
- Auvers-sur-Oise, in the Val-d'Oise département

== Other uses ==
- Auvers is a former French name for Antwerp, Belgium; the modern name is Anvers
