= Degré (disambiguation) =

Degré is a commune in France.

Degré or degre may also refer to:

- Alajos Degré (1819–1896), Hungarian lawyer and writer
- Tippi Degré (born 1990), French writer
