= Domfront =

Domfront may refer to:

== Places ==
Domfront may refer to one of several communes in France:

- Domfront, Oise, a commune in the Oise department in northern France
- Domfront, Orne, a commune in the Orne department in north-western France until 2015
  - Château de Domfront, a ruined castle in the town of Domfront, Orne
- Domfront-en-Poiraie, a commune in the department of Orne, northwestern France from 2016
- Domfront-en-Champagne, a commune in the Sarthe department in the Pays de la Loire region in north-western France

== People ==
- Ralph of Domfront (or Radulph, Radulfus; died c. 1146), an archbishop of Mamistra and second Latin patriarch of Antioch (as Ralph I) from 1135 until 1140
