= Brains-sur-Gée =

- Commune
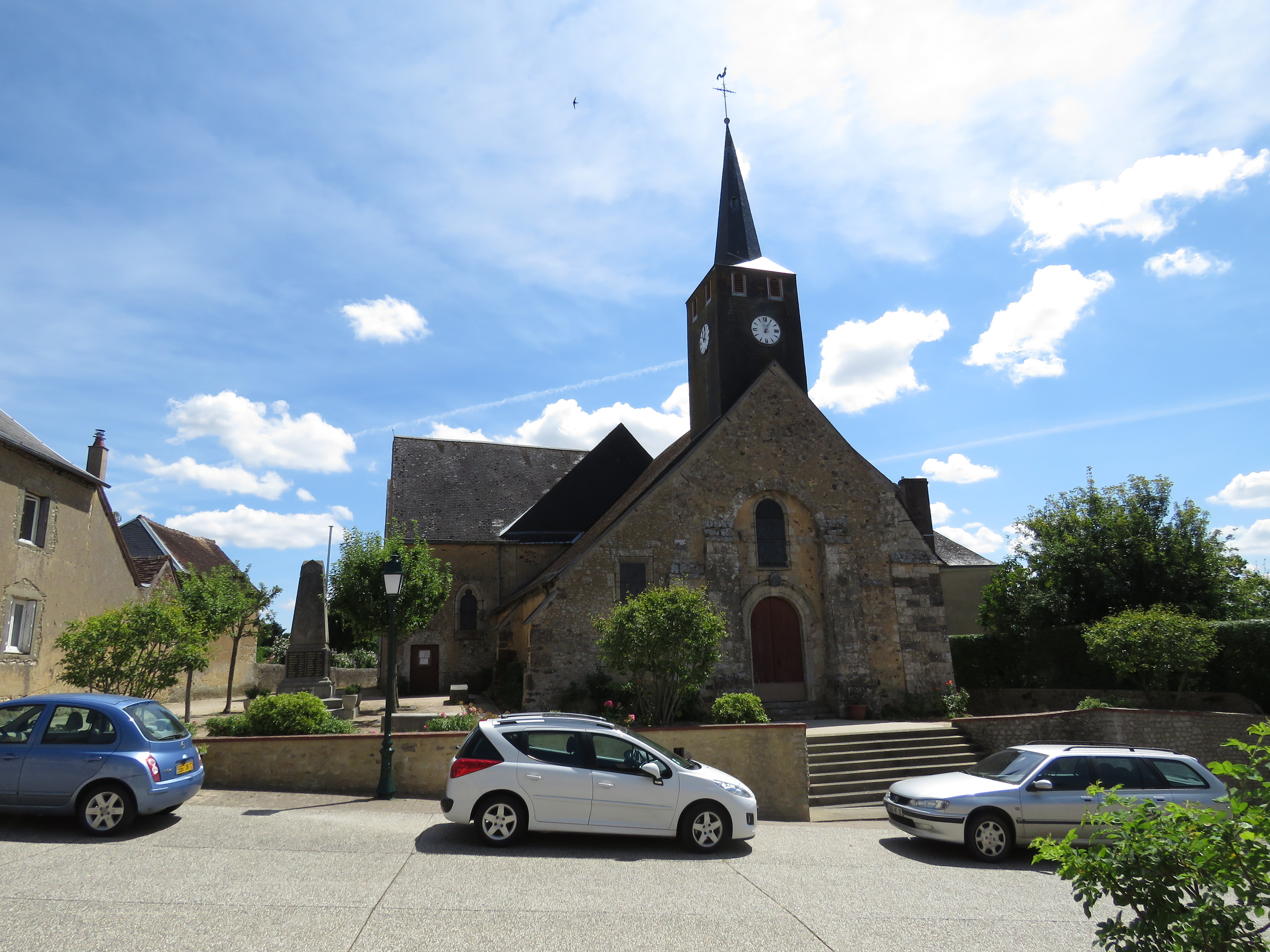
- The church
- Location of Brains-sur-Gée
- Location within France Location within Pays de la Loire
- Coordinates: 48°01′01″N 0°01′30″W
- Country: France
- Region: Pays de la Loire
- Department: Sarthe
- Arrondissement: La Flèche
- Canton: Loué
- Intercommunality: Loué - Brûlon - Noyen

Government
  - Mayor (2020–2026): Paulo Baptista
- Area^{1}: 15.9 km^{2} (6.1 sq mi)
- Highest elevation: 128 m (420 ft)
- Lowest elevation: 57 m (187 ft)
- Population (2023): 757
  - Density: 47.6/km^{2} (123/sq mi)
- Demonym(s): Brennois, Brennoise
- Time zone: UTC+01:00 (CET)
  - Summer (DST): UTC+02:00 (CEST)
- INSEE/Postal code: 72045 /72550
- ^{1} French Land Register data, which excludes lakes, ponds, glaciers > 1 km^{2} (0.386 sq mi or 247 acres) and river estuaries.

Brains-sur-Gée (French pronunciation: [bʁɛ̃ syʁ ʒe]) is a commune in the Sarthe department in the region of Pays de la Loire in north-western France.

== Population ==
Historical population

Year	Pop.	±% p.a.
1793	1,036	—
1800	1,023	−0.18%
1806	1,151	+1.98%
1821	1,189	+0.22%
1831	1,207	+0.15%
1836	1,103	−1.79%
1841	1,121	+0.32%
1846	1,066	−1.00%
1851	1,040	−0.49%
1856	1,015	−0.49%
1861	989	−0.52%
1866	939	−1.03%
1872	887	−0.95%
1876	873	−0.40%
1881	811	−1.46%
1886	798	−0.32%
1891	821	+0.57%
1896	728	−2.38%
1901	708	−0.56%

Year	Pop.	±% p.a.
1906	700	−0.23%
1911	663	−1.08%
1921	601	−0.98%
1926	602	+0.03%
1931	545	−1.97%
1936	507	−1.44%
1946	514	+0.14%
1954	477	−0.93%
1962	479	+0.05%
1968	420	−2.17%
1975	393	−0.94%
1982	380	−0.48%
1990	430	+1.56%
1999	456	+0.65%
2007	606	+3.62%
2012	740	+4.08%
2017	820	+2.07%
2023	757	−1.32%

From the year 1962 on: No double counting—residents of multiple communes (e.g. students and military personnel) are counted only once.
Source: EHESS and INSEE (1968-2023)

== See also ==
- Communes of the Sarthe department
