= Pirmil =

- Commune
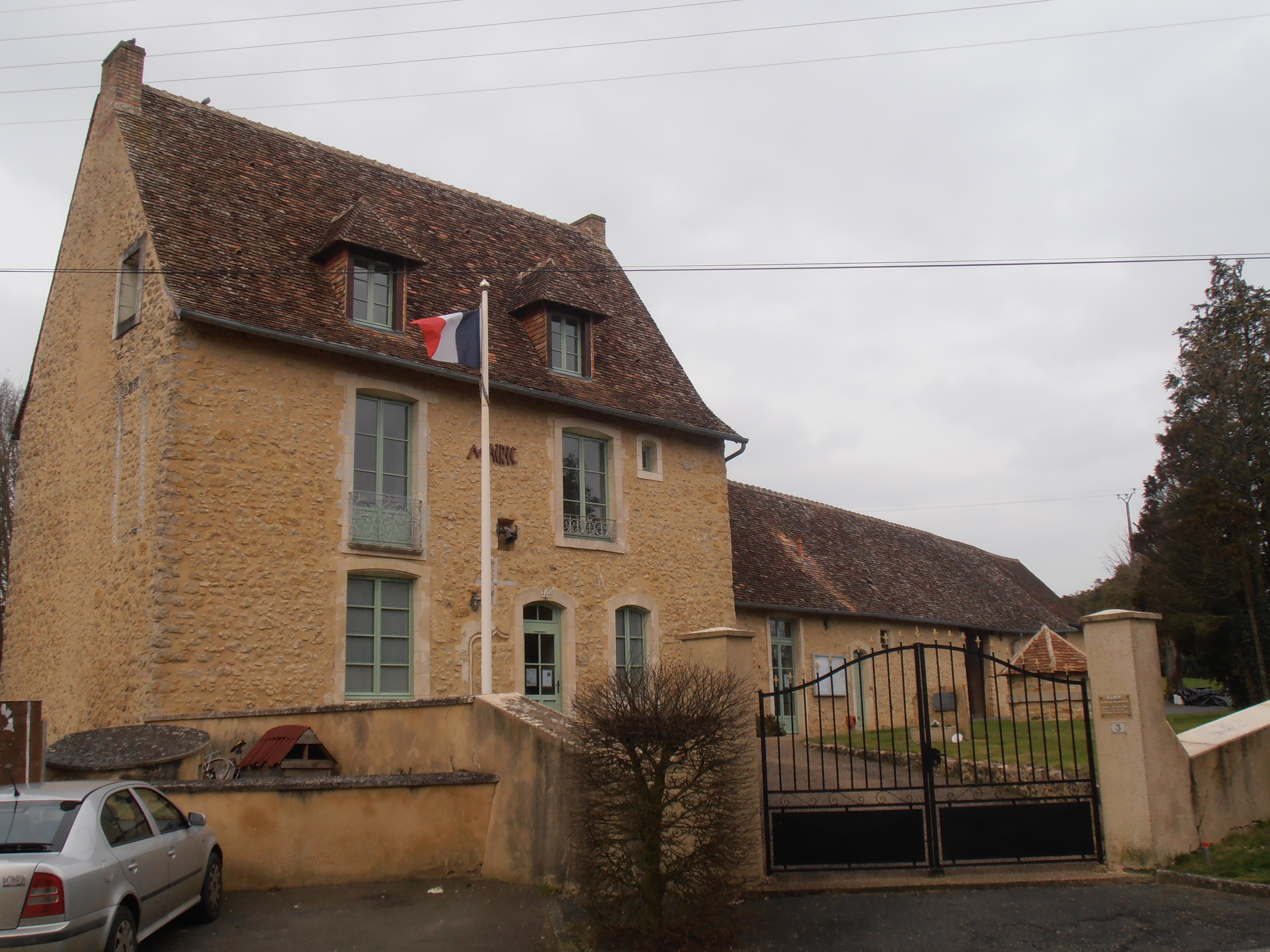
- The town hall of Pirmil
- Location of Pirmil
- Location within France Location within Pays de la Loire
- Coordinates: 47°54′45″N 0°05′52″W
- Country: France
- Region: Pays de la Loire
- Department: Sarthe
- Arrondissement: La Flèche
- Canton: Loué
- Intercommunality: Loué-Brûlon-Noyen

Government
  - Mayor (2020–2026): Christian Chotard
- Area^{1}: 17.40 km^{2} (6.72 sq mi)
- Highest elevation: 94 m (308 ft)
- Lowest elevation: 34 m (112 ft)
- Population (2023): 512
  - Density: 29.4/km^{2} (76.2/sq mi)
- Demonym(s): Pirmilien, Pirmilienne
- Time zone: UTC+01:00 (CET)
  - Summer (DST): UTC+02:00 (CEST)
- INSEE/Postal code: 72237 /72430
- ^{1} French Land Register data, which excludes lakes, ponds, glaciers > 1 km^{2} (0.386 sq mi or 247 acres) and river estuaries.

Pirmil (French pronunciation: [piʁmil]) is a commune in the Sarthe department in the region of Pays de la Loire in north-western France.

== Demography ==
Historical population
| Year | Pop. | ±% p.a. |
|---|---|---|
| 1968 | 551 | — |
| 1975 | 474 | −2.13% |
| 1982 | 401 | −2.36% |
| 1990 | 367 | −1.10% |
| 1999 | 382 | +0.45% |
| 2007 | 448 | +2.01% |
| 2012 | 496 | +2.06% |
| 2017 | 513 | +0.68% |
| 2023 | 512 | −0.03% |
Source: INSEE

== See also ==
- Communes of the Sarthe department
