= Mézières-sous-Lavardin =

- Commune
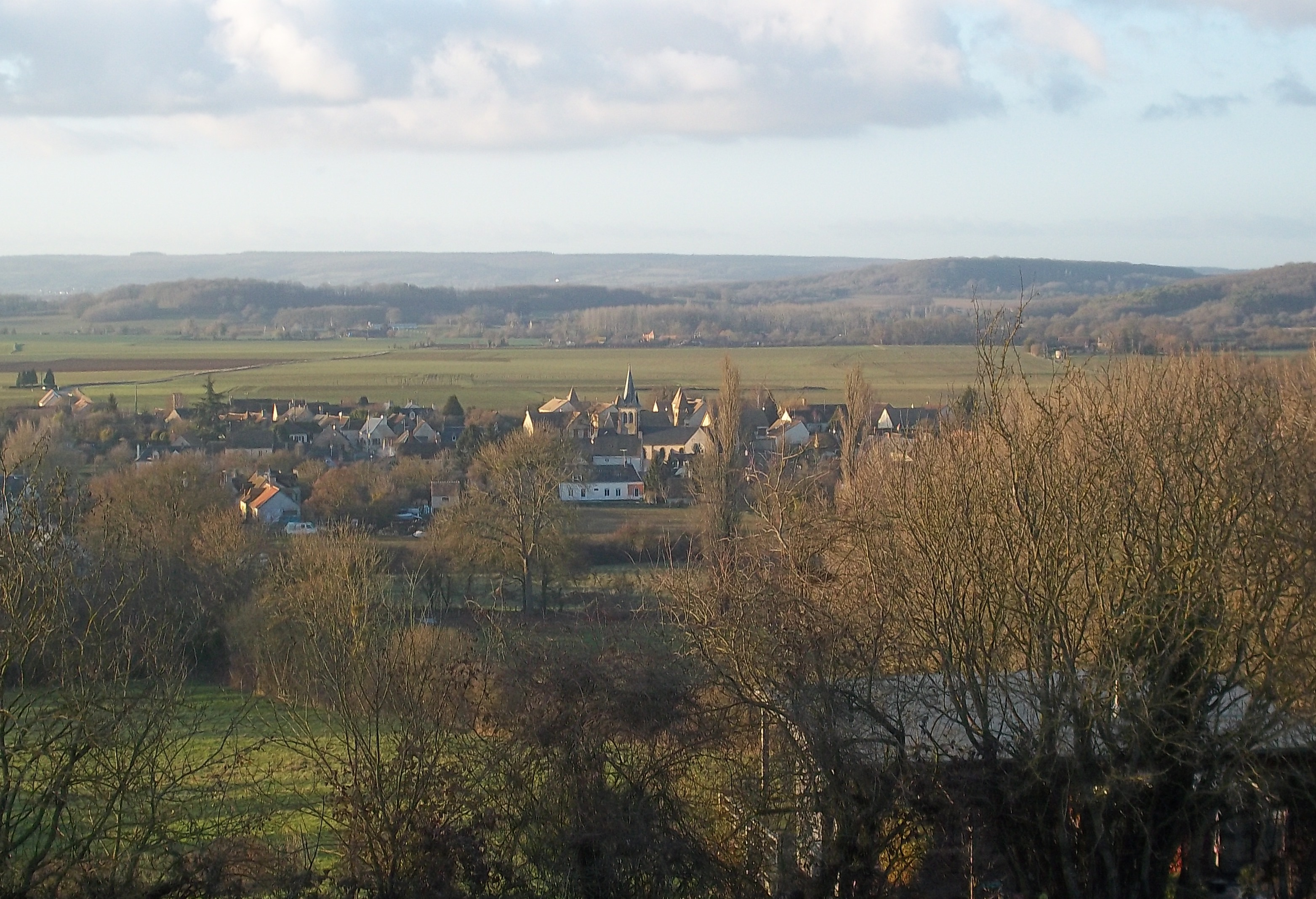
- A general view of Mézières-sous-Lavardin
- Location of Mézières-sous-Lavardin
- Location within France Location within Pays de la Loire
- Coordinates: 48°09′21″N 0°01′50″E
- Country: France
- Region: Pays de la Loire
- Department: Sarthe
- Arrondissement: Mamers
- Canton: Loué
- Intercommunality: Champagne Conlinoise et Pays de Sillé

Government
  - Mayor (2020–2026): Killian Trucas
- Area^{1}: 15.3 km^{2} (5.9 sq mi)
- Population (2023): 676
  - Density: 44.2/km^{2} (114/sq mi)
- Time zone: UTC+01:00 (CET)
  - Summer (DST): UTC+02:00 (CEST)
- INSEE/Postal code: 72197 /72240
- ^{1} French Land Register data, which excludes lakes, ponds, glaciers > 1 km^{2} (0.386 sq mi or 247 acres) and river estuaries.

Mézières-sous-Lavardin is a commune in the Sarthe department in the region of Pays de la Loire in north-western France.

== See also ==
- Communes of the Sarthe department
