= Émile de Kératry =

French politician, soldier and author (1832–1904)

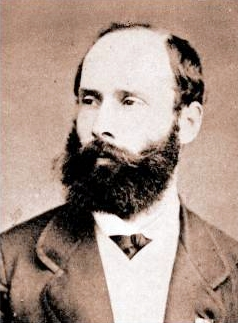
Émile de Kératry.

Comte Émile de Kératry (24 March 1832, Paris — 6 April 1904, Paris) was a French politician, soldier and author, the son of Auguste Hilarion (old French aristocraty family from Britany).

Kératry became deputy for Finistère in Brittany, in 1869, and strongly supported the Franco-Prussian War in 1870. He was in Paris during part of the siege, but escaped in a balloon, and joined Léon Gambetta. He was appointed to raise an "army of Brittany" from the west of France to strike back at the advancing Prussians, but his hastily assembled volunteers were poorly equipped and suffered poor conditions while being prepared for combat at Camp Conlie. As a result, Kératry resigned.

In 1871 Thiers appointed him to the prefecture, first of the Haute-Garonne, and subsequently of the Bouches-du-Rhône, but he resigned in the following year.

== Works ==
- La Contre-guérilla française au Mexique (1868)
- The Rise and Fall of the Emperor Maximilian (L'Élévation et la chute de l'empereur Maximilien) (1867)
- Le Quatre-septembre et le gouvernement de la défense nationale (1872)
- Mourad V, prince, sultan, prisonnier d'État 1840-78 (1878)
