= Saint-Christophe-en-Champagne =

- Commune
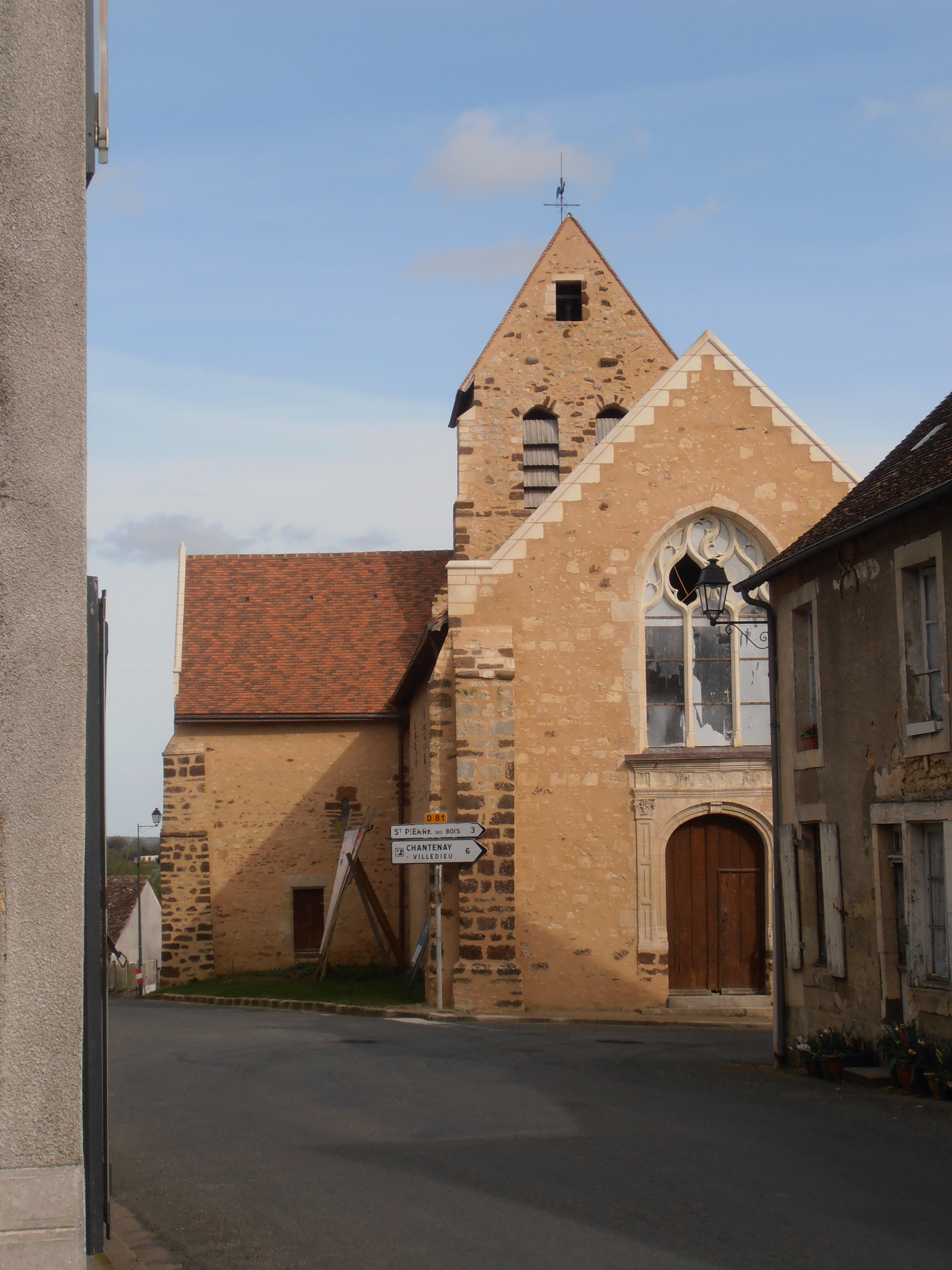
- The church of Saint-Christophe
- Location of Saint-Christophe-en-Champagne
- Location within France Location within Pays de la Loire
- Coordinates: 47°58′07″N 0°08′17″W
- Country: France
- Region: Pays de la Loire
- Department: Sarthe
- Arrondissement: La Flèche
- Canton: Loué
- Intercommunality: Loué-Brûlon-Noyen

Government
  - Mayor (2020–2026): Marcel Geslot
- Area^{1}: 7.81 km^{2} (3.02 sq mi)
- Highest elevation: 109 m (358 ft)
- Lowest elevation: 64 m (210 ft)
- Population (2023): 218
  - Density: 27.9/km^{2} (72.3/sq mi)
- Demonym(s): Saint Christophois, Saint Christophoise
- Time zone: UTC+01:00 (CET)
  - Summer (DST): UTC+02:00 (CEST)
- INSEE/Postal code: 72274 /72540
- ^{1} French Land Register data, which excludes lakes, ponds, glaciers > 1 km^{2} (0.386 sq mi or 247 acres) and river estuaries.

Saint-Christophe-en-Champagne is a commune in the Sarthe department in the region of Pays de la Loire in north-western France.

== See also ==
- Communes of the Sarthe department
