= Cures, Sarthe =

Cures
- Commune
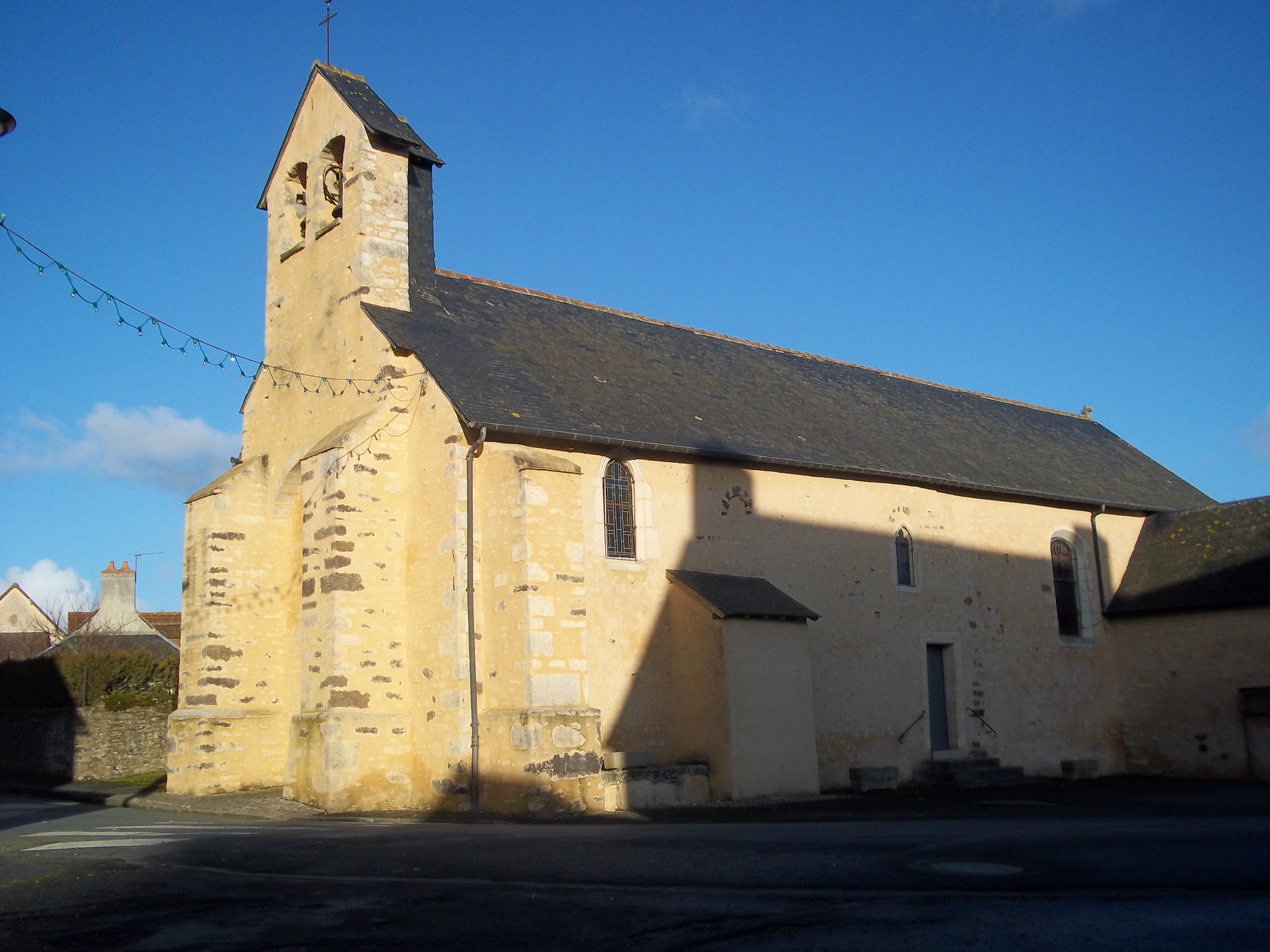
- The church in Cures
- Location of Cures
- Location within France Location within Pays de la Loire
- Coordinates: 48°06′03″N 0°00′18″E
- Country: France
- Region: Pays de la Loire
- Department: Sarthe
- Arrondissement: Mamers
- Canton: Loué
- Intercommunality: Champagne Conlinoise et Pays de Sillé

Government
  - Mayor (2020–2026): Dominique Amiard
- Area^{1}: 11.57 km^{2} (4.47 sq mi)
- Highest elevation: 176 m (577 ft)
- Lowest elevation: 77 m (253 ft)
- Population (2023): 489
  - Density: 42.3/km^{2} (109/sq mi)
- Time zone: UTC+01:00 (CET)
  - Summer (DST): UTC+02:00 (CEST)
- INSEE/Postal code: 72111 /72240
- ^{1} French Land Register data, which excludes lakes, ponds, glaciers > 1 km^{2} (0.386 sq mi or 247 acres) and river estuaries.

Cures (French pronunciation: [kyʁ]) is a commune in the Sarthe department in the Pays de la Loire region in north-western France.

== See also ==
- Communes of the Sarthe department
