= Conlie =

- Commune
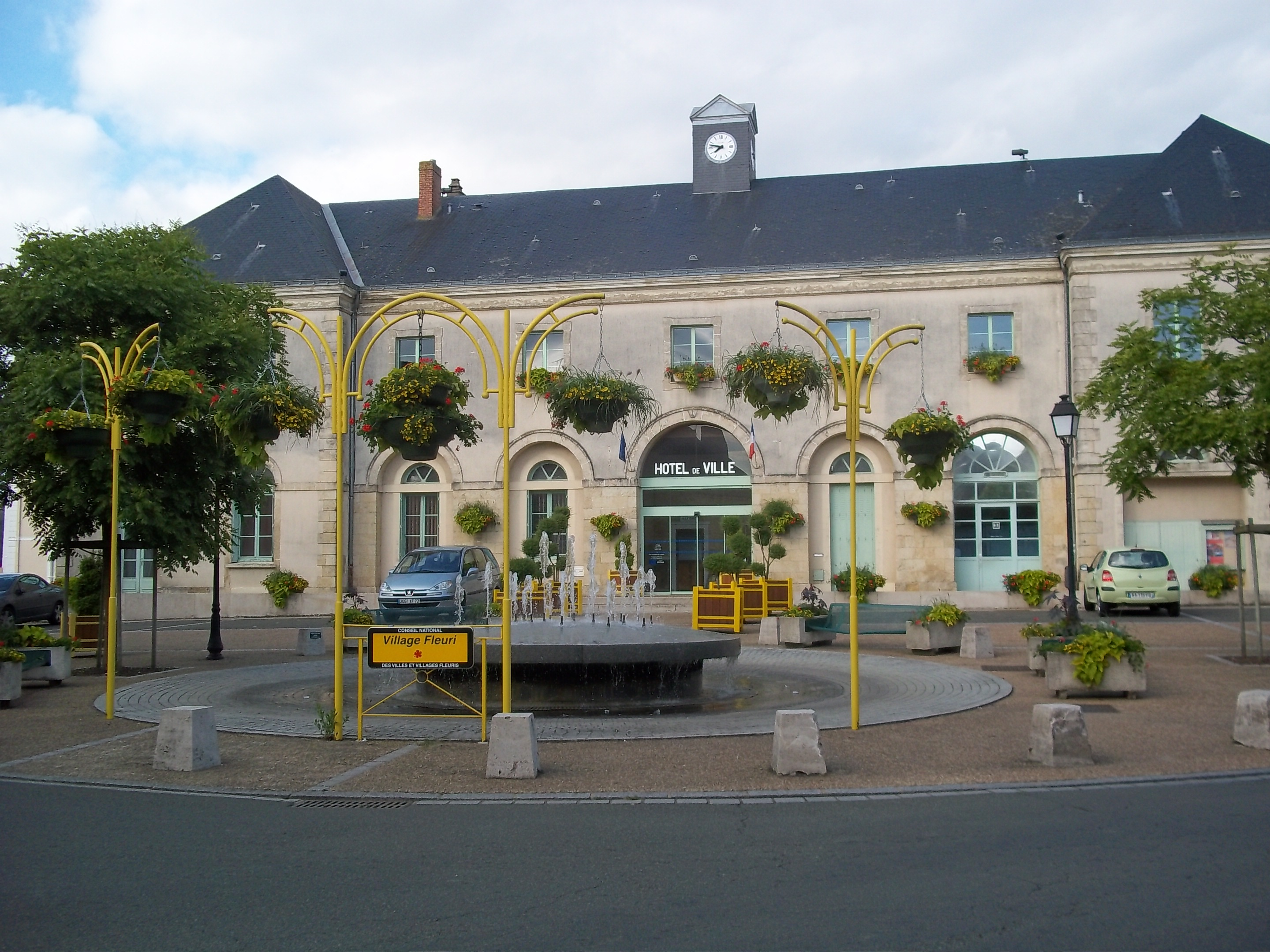
- Town hall
- Location of Conlie
- Location within France Location within Pays de la Loire
- Coordinates: 48°07′30″N 0°01′02″W
- Country: France
- Region: Pays de la Loire
- Department: Sarthe
- Arrondissement: Mamers
- Canton: Loué
- Intercommunality: Champagne Conlinoise et Pays de Sillé

Government
  - Mayor (2020–2026): Christian Lemasson
- Area^{1}: 17.16 km^{2} (6.63 sq mi)
- Highest elevation: 164 m (538 ft)
- Population (2023): 1,833
  - Density: 106.8/km^{2} (276.7/sq mi)
- Demonym(s): Conlinois, Conlinoise
- Time zone: UTC+01:00 (CET)
  - Summer (DST): UTC+02:00 (CEST)
- INSEE/Postal code: 72089 /72240
- ^{1} French Land Register data, which excludes lakes, ponds, glaciers > 1 km^{2} (0.386 sq mi or 247 acres) and river estuaries.

Conlie (French pronunciation: [kɔ̃li]) is a commune in the Sarthe department in the Pays de la Loire region in north-western France.

During the Franco-Prussian War the village was the location of Camp Conlie, where thousands of Breton volunteers were kept in allegedly degrading conditions.

== See also ==
- Communes of the Sarthe department
