= Maigné =

- Commune
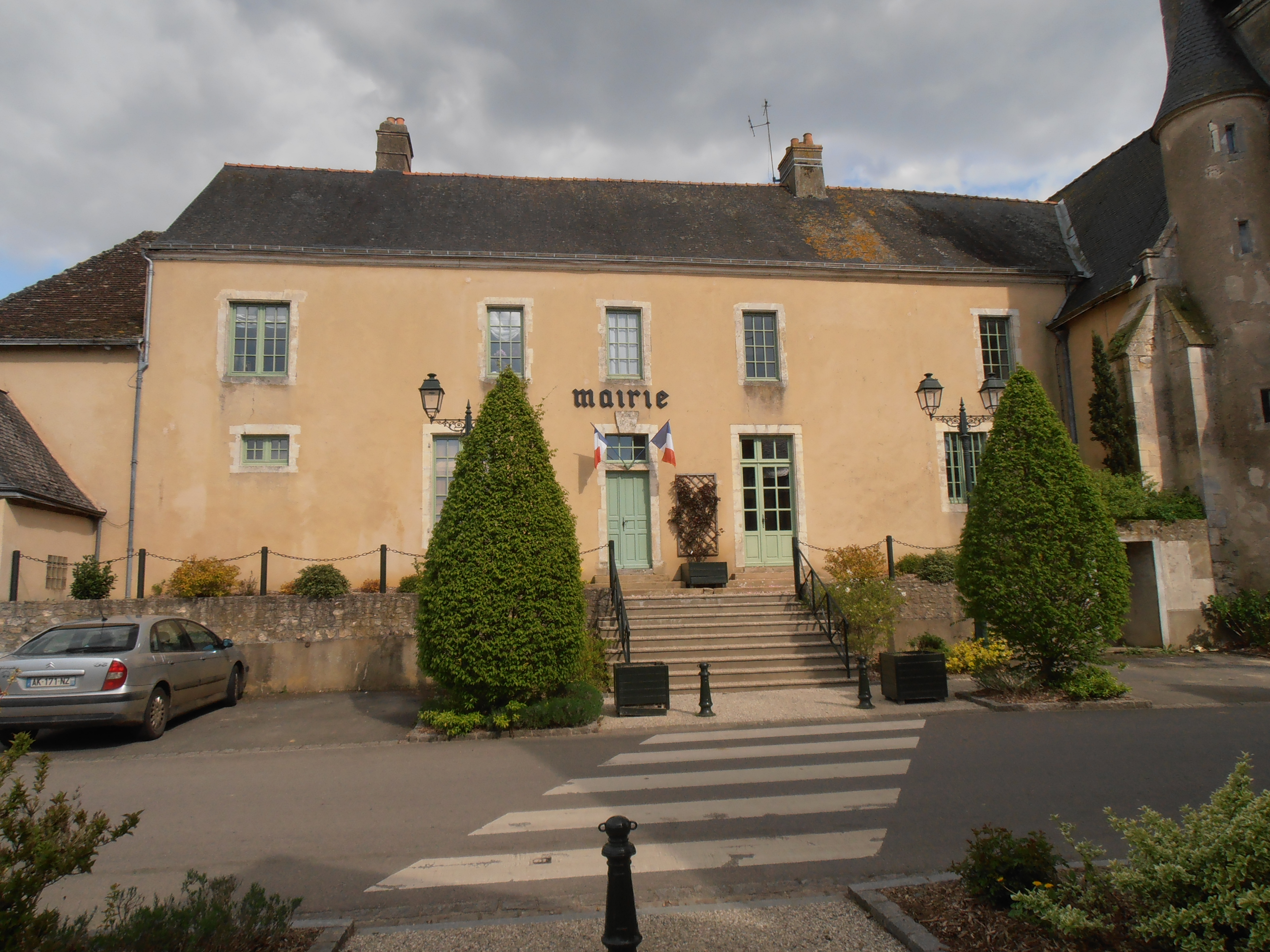
- The town hall of Maigné
- Location of Maigné
- Location within France Location within Pays de la Loire
- Coordinates: 47°56′16″N 0°03′10″E
- Country: France
- Region: Pays de la Loire
- Department: Sarthe
- Arrondissement: La Flèche
- Canton: Loué
- Intercommunality: Loué-Brûlon-Noyen

Government
  - Mayor (2020–2026): Cédric Boul
- Area^{1}: 11.5 km^{2} (4.4 sq mi)
- Population (2023): 326
  - Density: 28.3/km^{2} (73.4/sq mi)
- Demonym(s): Maignénois, Maignénoise
- Time zone: UTC+01:00 (CET)
  - Summer (DST): UTC+02:00 (CEST)
- INSEE/Postal code: 72177 /72210
- ^{1} French Land Register data, which excludes lakes, ponds, glaciers > 1 km^{2} (0.386 sq mi or 247 acres) and river estuaries.

Maigné (French pronunciation: [mɛɲe]) is a commune in the Sarthe department in the region of Pays de la Loire in north-western France.

== See also ==
- Communes of the Sarthe department
