= Amné =

- Commune
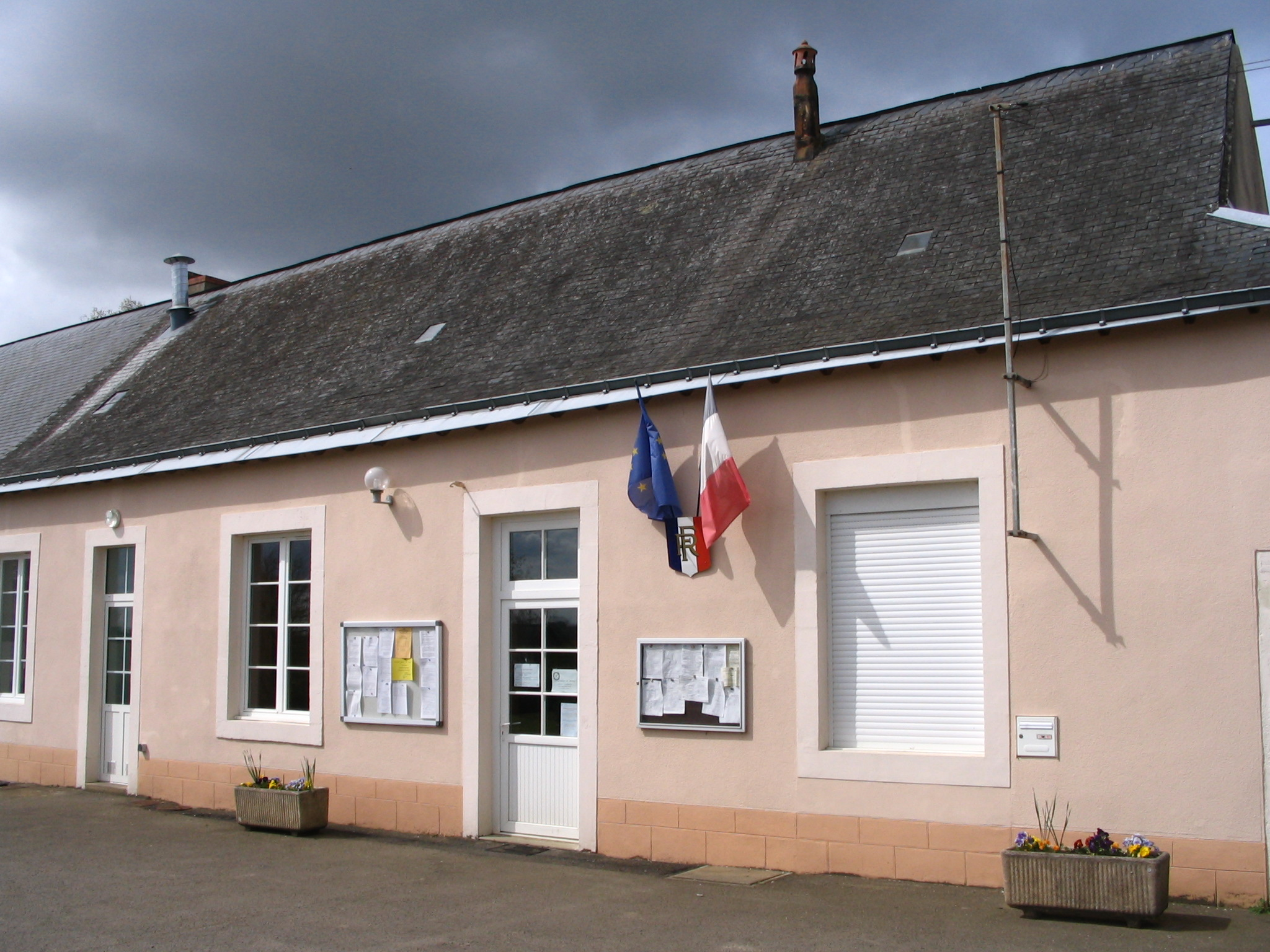
- Town hall
- Location of Amné
- Location within France Location within Pays de la Loire
- Coordinates: 48°02′27″N 0°03′29″W
- Country: France
- Region: Pays de la Loire
- Department: Sarthe
- Arrondissement: La Flèche
- Canton: Loué
- Intercommunality: Loué-Brûlon-Noyen

Government
  - Mayor (2020–2026): Gérard Joly
- Area^{1}: 15.95 km^{2} (6.16 sq mi)
- Highest elevation: 182 m (597 ft)
- Lowest elevation: 59 m (194 ft)
- Population (2023): 569
  - Density: 35.7/km^{2} (92.4/sq mi)
- Time zone: UTC+01:00 (CET)
  - Summer (DST): UTC+02:00 (CEST)
- INSEE/Postal code: 72004 /72540
- ^{1} French Land Register data, which excludes lakes, ponds, glaciers > 1 km^{2} (0.386 sq mi or 247 acres) and river estuaries.

Amné is a commune in the Sarthe department in the region of Pays de la Loire in north-western France.

== See also ==
- Communes of the Sarthe department
