= Lavardin, Sarthe =

Lavardin
- Commune
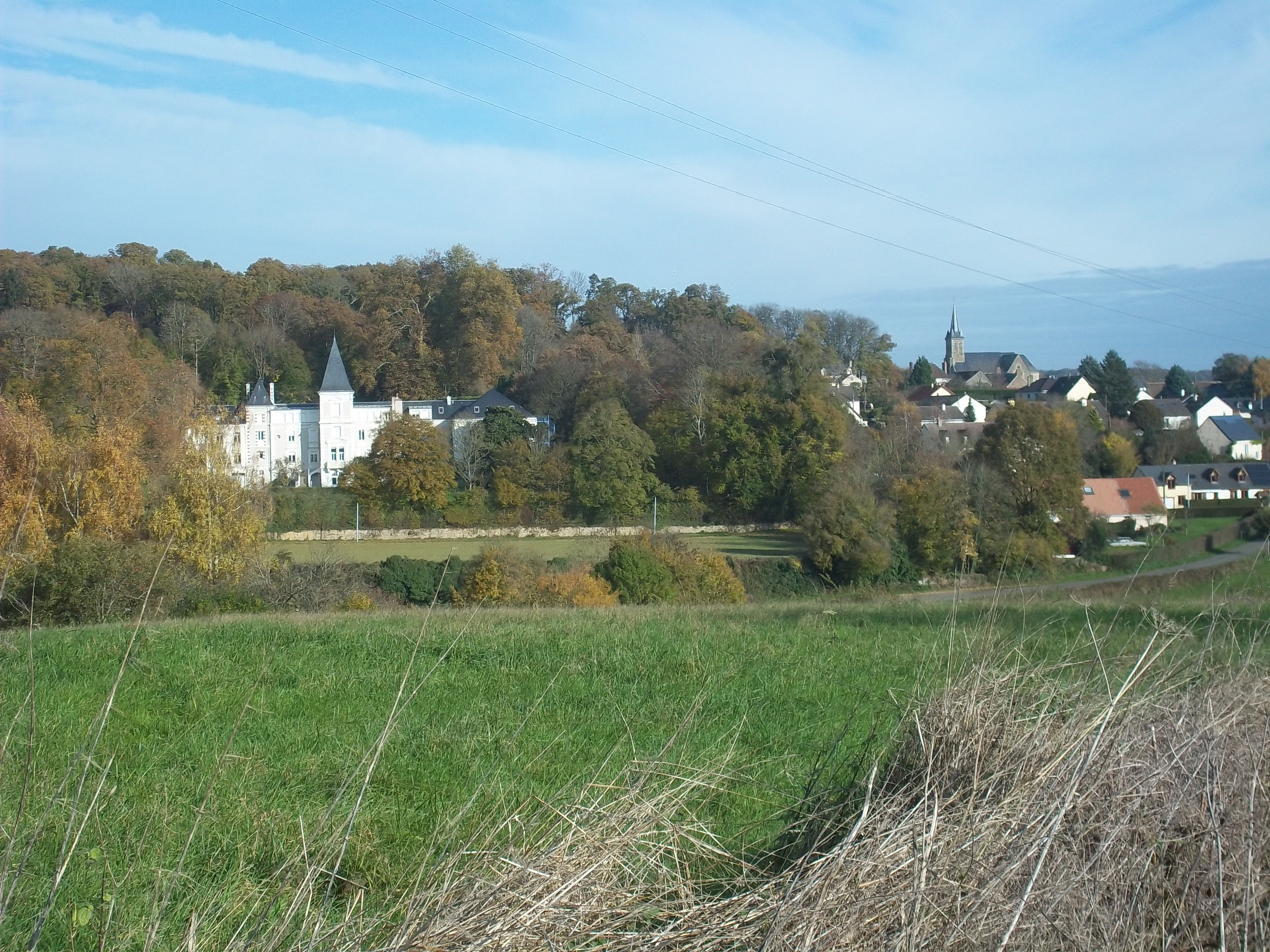
- A general view of Lavardin, with the chateau

- Coat of arms
- Location of Lavardin
- Location within France Location within Pays de la Loire
- Coordinates: 48°04′41″N 0°03′46″E
- Country: France
- Region: Pays de la Loire
- Department: Sarthe
- Arrondissement: Mamers
- Canton: Loué
- Intercommunality: Champagne Conlinoise et Pays de Sillé

Government
  - Mayor (2020–2026): Rémy Mauboussin
- Area^{1}: 8 km^{2} (3.1 sq mi)
- Highest elevation: 168 m (551 ft)
- Lowest elevation: 69 m (226 ft)
- Population (2023): 693
  - Density: 87/km^{2} (220/sq mi)
- Demonym(s): Lavardinois, Lavardinoise
- Time zone: UTC+01:00 (CET)
  - Summer (DST): UTC+02:00 (CEST)
- INSEE/Postal code: 72157 /72240
- ^{1} French Land Register data, which excludes lakes, ponds, glaciers > 1 km^{2} (0.386 sq mi or 247 acres) and river estuaries.

Lavardin (French pronunciation: [lavaʁdɛ̃]) is a commune in the Sarthe department in the region of Pays de la Loire in northwestern France.

== See also ==
- Communes of the Sarthe department
