= Viré-en-Champagne =

- Commune
- Location of Viré-en-Champagne
- Location within France Location within Pays de la Loire
- Coordinates: 47°59′08″N 0°17′16″W
- Country: France
- Region: Pays de la Loire
- Department: Sarthe
- Arrondissement: La Flèche
- Canton: Loué
- Intercommunality: Loué-Brûlon-Noyen

Government
  - Mayor (2020–2026): Catherine Paulouin
- Area^{1}: 11.48 km^{2} (4.43 sq mi)
- Population (2023): 204
  - Density: 17.8/km^{2} (46.0/sq mi)
- Time zone: UTC+01:00 (CET)
  - Summer (DST): UTC+02:00 (CEST)
- INSEE/Postal code: 72379 /72350
- ^{1} French Land Register data, which excludes lakes, ponds, glaciers > 1 km^{2} (0.386 sq mi or 247 acres) and river estuaries.

Viré-en-Champagne (French pronunciation: [viʁe ɑ̃ ʃɑ̃paɲ], before 1962: Viré) is a commune in the Sarthe department in the region of Pays de la Loire in north-western France. In 2019 it had 195 inhabitants.

== See also ==
- Communes of the Sarthe department
