= La Chapelle-Saint-Fray =

- Commune
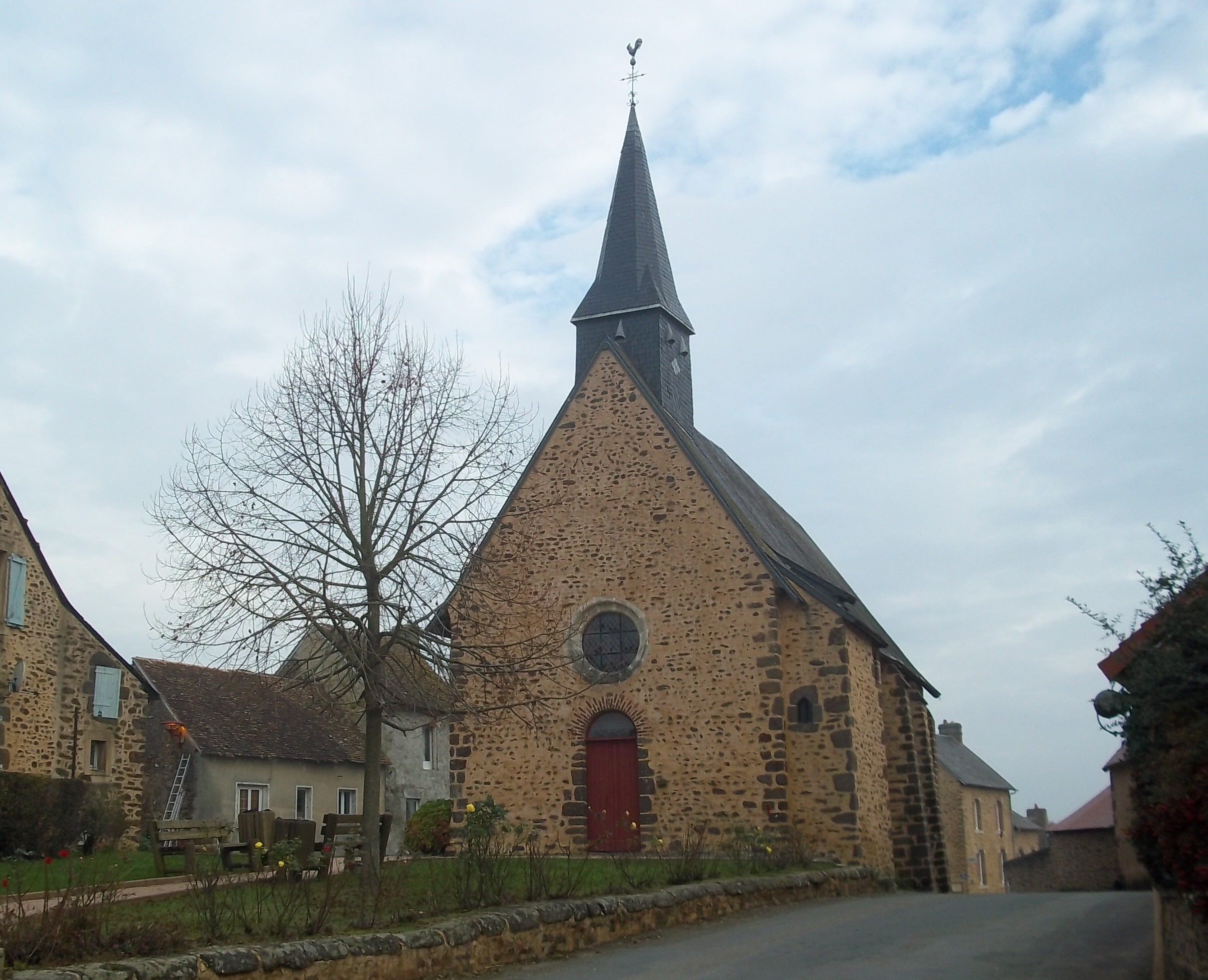
- The church
- Location of La Chapelle-Saint-Fray
- Location within France Location within Pays de la Loire
- Coordinates: 48°06′39″N 0°04′51″E
- Country: France
- Region: Pays de la Loire
- Department: Sarthe
- Arrondissement: Mamers
- Canton: Loué
- Intercommunality: Champagne Conlinoise et Pays de Sillé

Government
  - Mayor (2020–2026): Sonia Moinet
- Area^{1}: 6.38 km^{2} (2.46 sq mi)
- Population (2023): 421
  - Density: 66.0/km^{2} (171/sq mi)
- Demonym(s): Capellofrayen, Capellofrayenne
- Time zone: UTC+01:00 (CET)
  - Summer (DST): UTC+02:00 (CEST)
- INSEE/Postal code: 72066 /72240
- ^{1} French Land Register data, which excludes lakes, ponds, glaciers > 1 km^{2} (0.386 sq mi or 247 acres) and river estuaries.

La Chapelle-Saint-Fray (French pronunciation: [la ʃapɛl sɛ̃ fʁɛ]) is a commune in the Sarthe department in the Pays de la Loire region in north-western France.

== See also ==
- Communes of the Sarthe department
