= Tassillé =

- Commune
- Location of Tassillé
- Location within France Location within Pays de la Loire
- Coordinates: 47°59′33″N 0°05′33″W
- Country: France
- Region: Pays de la Loire
- Department: Sarthe
- Arrondissement: La Flèche
- Canton: Loué
- Intercommunality: Loué - Brûlon - Noyen

Government
  - Mayor (2020–2026): Gaetan Vallée
- Area^{1}: 6.6 km^{2} (2.5 sq mi)
- Highest elevation: 104 m (341 ft)
- Lowest elevation: 70 m (230 ft)
- Population (2023): 136
  - Density: 21/km^{2} (53/sq mi)
- Time zone: UTC+01:00 (CET)
  - Summer (DST): UTC+02:00 (CEST)
- INSEE/Postal code: 72348 /72540
- ^{1} French Land Register data, which excludes lakes, ponds, glaciers > 1 km^{2} (0.386 sq mi or 247 acres) and river estuaries.

Tassillé is a commune in the Sarthe department in the region of Pays de la Loire in north-western France.

== See also ==
- Communes of the Sarthe department
