= Noyen-sur-Sarthe =

- Commune
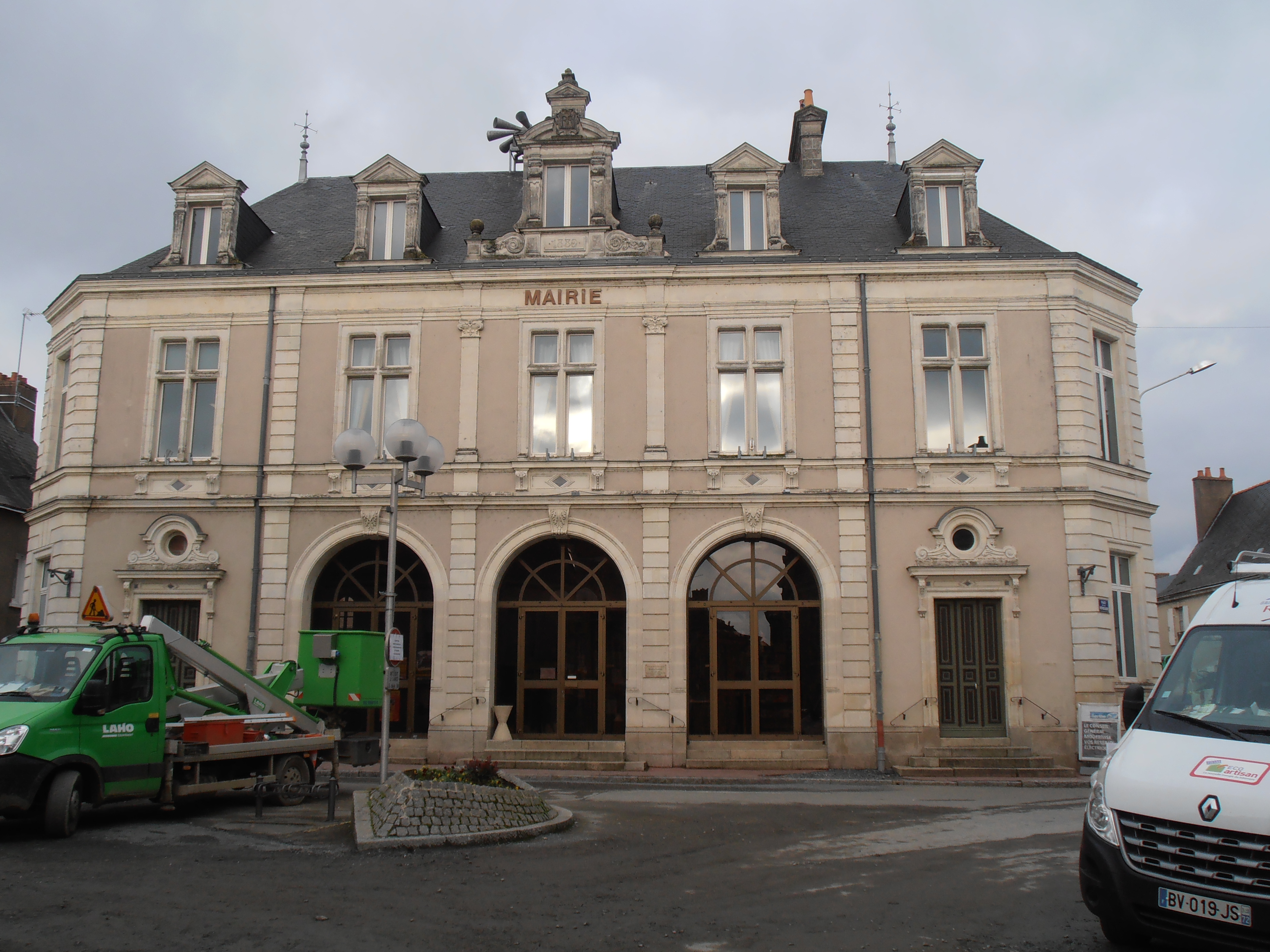
- The town hall of Noyen-sur-Sarthe
- Location of Noyen-sur-Sarthe
- Location within France Location within Pays de la Loire
- Coordinates: 47°52′00″N 0°06′00″W
- Country: France
- Region: Pays de la Loire
- Department: Sarthe
- Arrondissement: La Flèche
- Canton: Loué
- Intercommunality: CC Loué-Brûlon-Noyen

Government
  - Mayor (2020–2026): Jean-Louis Morice
- Area^{1}: 43.58 km^{2} (16.83 sq mi)
- Population (2023): 2,556
  - Density: 58.65/km^{2} (151.9/sq mi)
- Demonym(s): Noyennais, Noyennaise
- Time zone: UTC+01:00 (CET)
  - Summer (DST): UTC+02:00 (CEST)
- INSEE/Postal code: 72223 /72430
- Website: http://www.noyen-sur-sarthe.fr
- ^{1} French Land Register data, which excludes lakes, ponds, glaciers > 1 km^{2} (0.386 sq mi or 247 acres) and river estuaries.

Noyen-sur-Sarthe (French pronunciation: [nwajɛ̃ syʁ saʁt], literally Noyen on Sarthe, before 1962: Noyen) is a commune in the Sarthe department in the region of Pays de la Loire in north-western France.

== Population ==
Historical population
Year	Pop.	±% p.a.
1968	2,077	—
1975	2,010	−0.47%
1982	2,029	+0.13%
1990	2,192	+0.97%
1999	2,290	+0.49%
2007	2,533	+1.27%
2012	2,652	+0.92%
2017	2,611	−0.31%
2023	2,556	−0.35%
Source: INSEE

== See also ==
- Communes of the Sarthe department
