= Vallon-sur-Gée =

- Commune
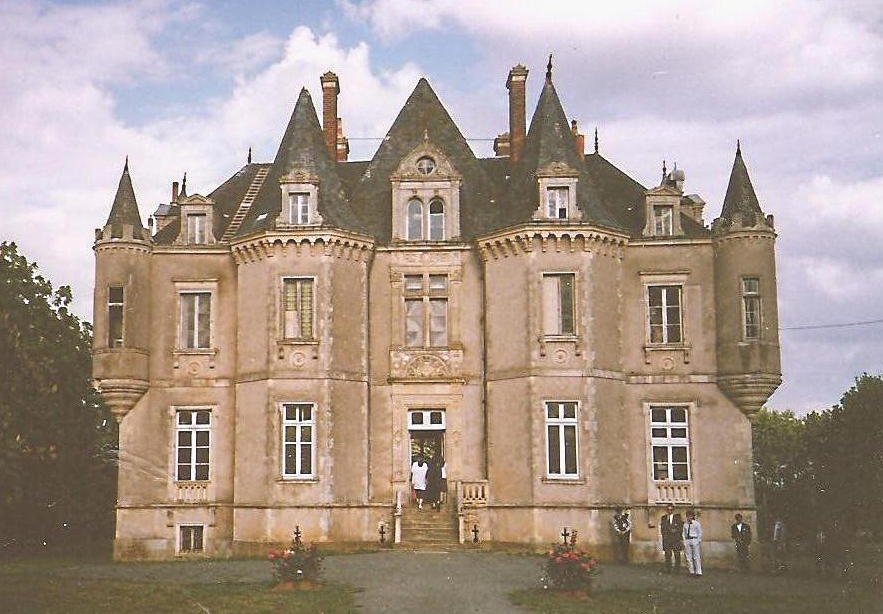
- The château of la Grange Moreau
- Location of Vallon-sur-Gée
- Location within France Location within Pays de la Loire
- Coordinates: 47°57′48″N 0°04′00″W
- Country: France
- Region: Pays de la Loire
- Department: Sarthe
- Arrondissement: La Flèche
- Canton: Loué
- Intercommunality: Loué - Brûlon - Noyen

Government
  - Mayor (2020–2026): Dany Paris
- Area^{1}: 17.3 km^{2} (6.7 sq mi)
- Highest elevation: 101 m (331 ft)
- Lowest elevation: 42 m (138 ft)
- Population (2023): 774
  - Density: 44.7/km^{2} (116/sq mi)
- Time zone: UTC+01:00 (CET)
  - Summer (DST): UTC+02:00 (CEST)
- INSEE/Postal code: 72367 /72540
- ^{1} French Land Register data, which excludes lakes, ponds, glaciers > 1 km^{2} (0.386 sq mi or 247 acres) and river estuaries.

Vallon-sur-Gée (French pronunciation: [valɔ̃ syʁ ʒe]) is a commune in the Sarthe department in the region of Pays de la Loire in north-western France.

== See also ==
- Communes of the Sarthe department
