= Sainte-Sabine-sur-Longève =

- Commune
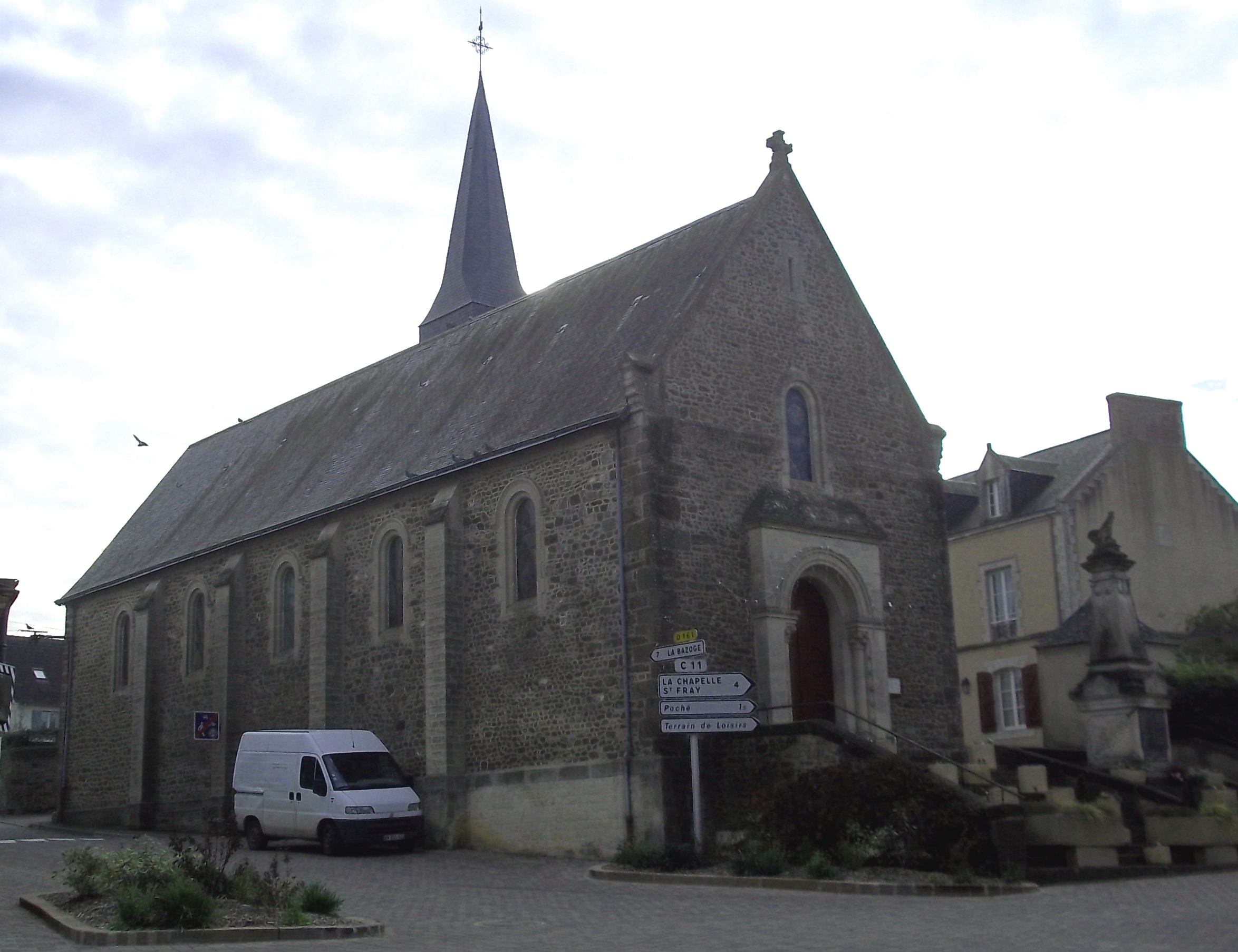
- The church of Sainte-Sabine-sur-Longève
- Location of Sainte-Sabine-sur-Longève
- Location within France Location within Pays de la Loire
- Coordinates: 48°08′28″N 0°05′42″E
- Country: France
- Region: Pays de la Loire
- Department: Sarthe
- Arrondissement: Mamers
- Canton: Loué
- Intercommunality: Champagne Conlinoise et Pays de Sillé

Government
  - Mayor (2020–2026): Mikaël Fouchard
- Area^{1}: 11.82 km^{2} (4.56 sq mi)
- Highest elevation: 167 m (548 ft)
- Lowest elevation: 67 m (220 ft)
- Population (2023): 743
  - Density: 62.9/km^{2} (163/sq mi)
- Demonym(s): Sabinois, Sabinoise
- Time zone: UTC+01:00 (CET)
  - Summer (DST): UTC+02:00 (CEST)
- INSEE/Postal code: 72319 /72380
- ^{1} French Land Register data, which excludes lakes, ponds, glaciers > 1 km^{2} (0.386 sq mi or 247 acres) and river estuaries.

Sainte-Sabine-sur-Longève (French pronunciation: [sɛ̃t sabin syʁ lɔ̃ʒɛv]) is a commune in the Sarthe department in the region of Pays de la Loire in north-western France.

== See also ==
- Communes of the Sarthe department
