= Saint-Pierre-des-Bois =

- Commune
- Coat of arms
- Location of Saint-Pierre-des-Bois
- Location within France Location within Pays de la Loire
- Coordinates: 47°56′24″N 0°08′23″W
- Country: France
- Region: Pays de la Loire
- Department: Sarthe
- Arrondissement: La Flèche
- Canton: Loué
- Intercommunality: Loué-Brûlon-Noyen

Government
  - Mayor (2020–2026): Florent Portais
- Area^{1}: 7.54 km^{2} (2.91 sq mi)
- Highest elevation: 102 m (335 ft)
- Lowest elevation: 47 m (154 ft)
- Population (2023): 220
  - Density: 29/km^{2} (76/sq mi)
- Time zone: UTC+01:00 (CET)
  - Summer (DST): UTC+02:00 (CEST)
- INSEE/Postal code: 72312 /72430
- ^{1} French Land Register data, which excludes lakes, ponds, glaciers > 1 km^{2} (0.386 sq mi or 247 acres) and river estuaries.

Saint-Pierre-des-Bois (French pronunciation: [sɛ̃ pjɛʁ de bwa]) is a commune in the Sarthe department in the region of Pays de la Loire in north-western France.

== See also ==
- Communes of the Sarthe department
