= Auguste Hilarion, comte de Kératry =

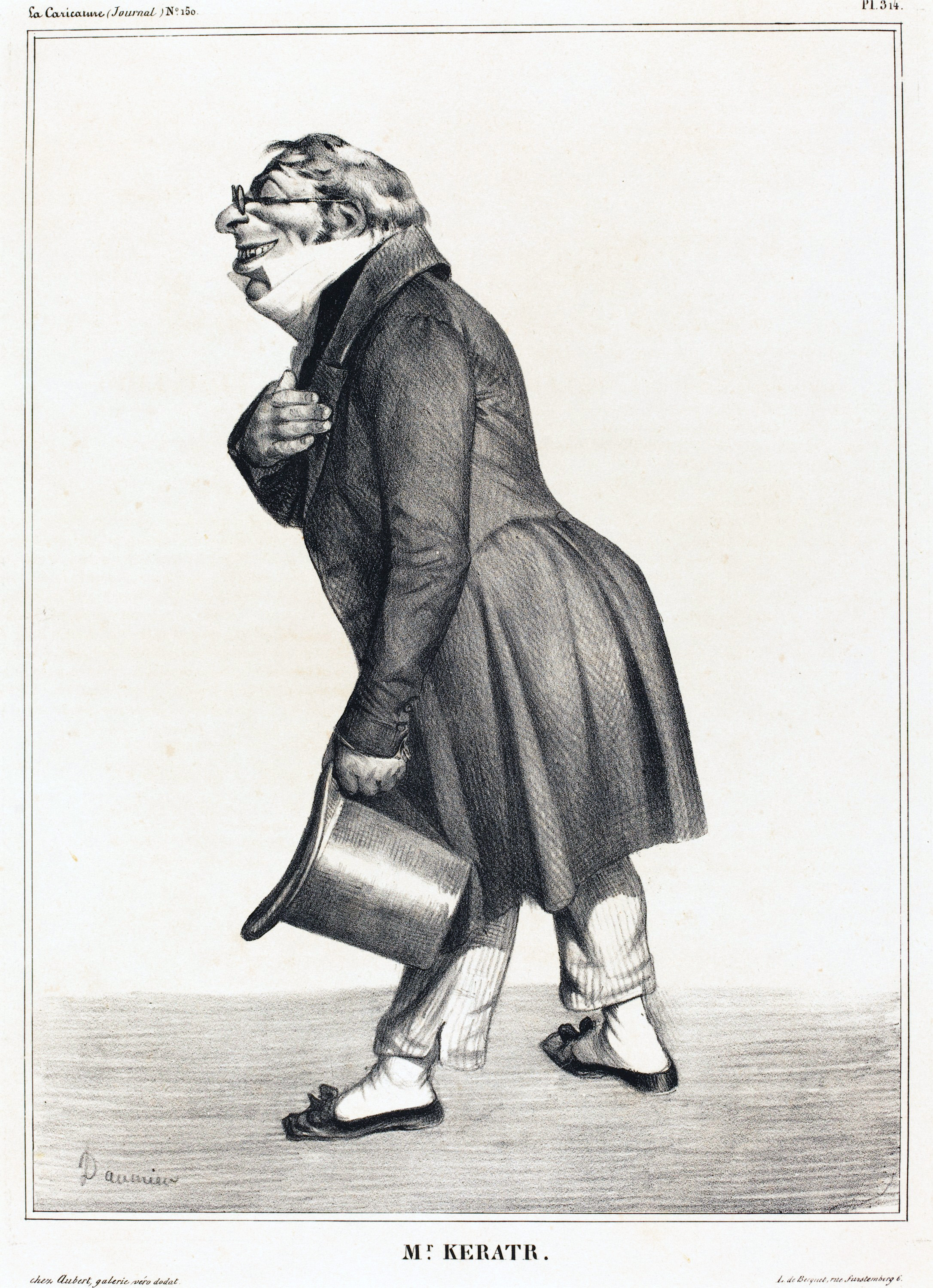
Caricature by Honoré Daumier, 1833.

Auguste Hilarion, comte de Kératry (28 December 1769 – 7 November 1859), was a French poet, novelist, short story writer, literary critic, historian, and politician. He was the father of Emile de Kératry.

== Life ==
Hilarion was born in Rennes in Brittany. Coming to Paris in 1790, he associated himself with Bernardin de Saint-Pierre. After being twice imprisoned during the Reign of Terror he retired to his native region, where he devoted himself to literature until 1814.

In 1818, after the Bourbon Restoration, he returned to Paris as deputy for Finistère, and sat in the Chamber of Deputies until 1824, becoming one of the recognized liberal leaders. He was re-elected in 1827, took an active part in the establishment of the July Monarchy, was appointed a councillor of state (1830), and in 1837 was made a Peer of France.

A member of the French National Assembly during the Second French Republic, he retired from public life after Louis-Napoléon Bonaparte coup d'etat of 1851. He died in Port-Marly.

== Works ==
- Contes et Idylles (1791)
- Lysus et Cydippe (a poem; 1801)
- Inductions morales et physiologiques (1817)
- Documents pour servir à l'histoire de France (1820)
- Du Beau dans les arts d'imitation (1822)
- Le Dernier des Beaumanoir (1824)
- Clarisse (a novel; 1854)
