= Loué =

- Commune
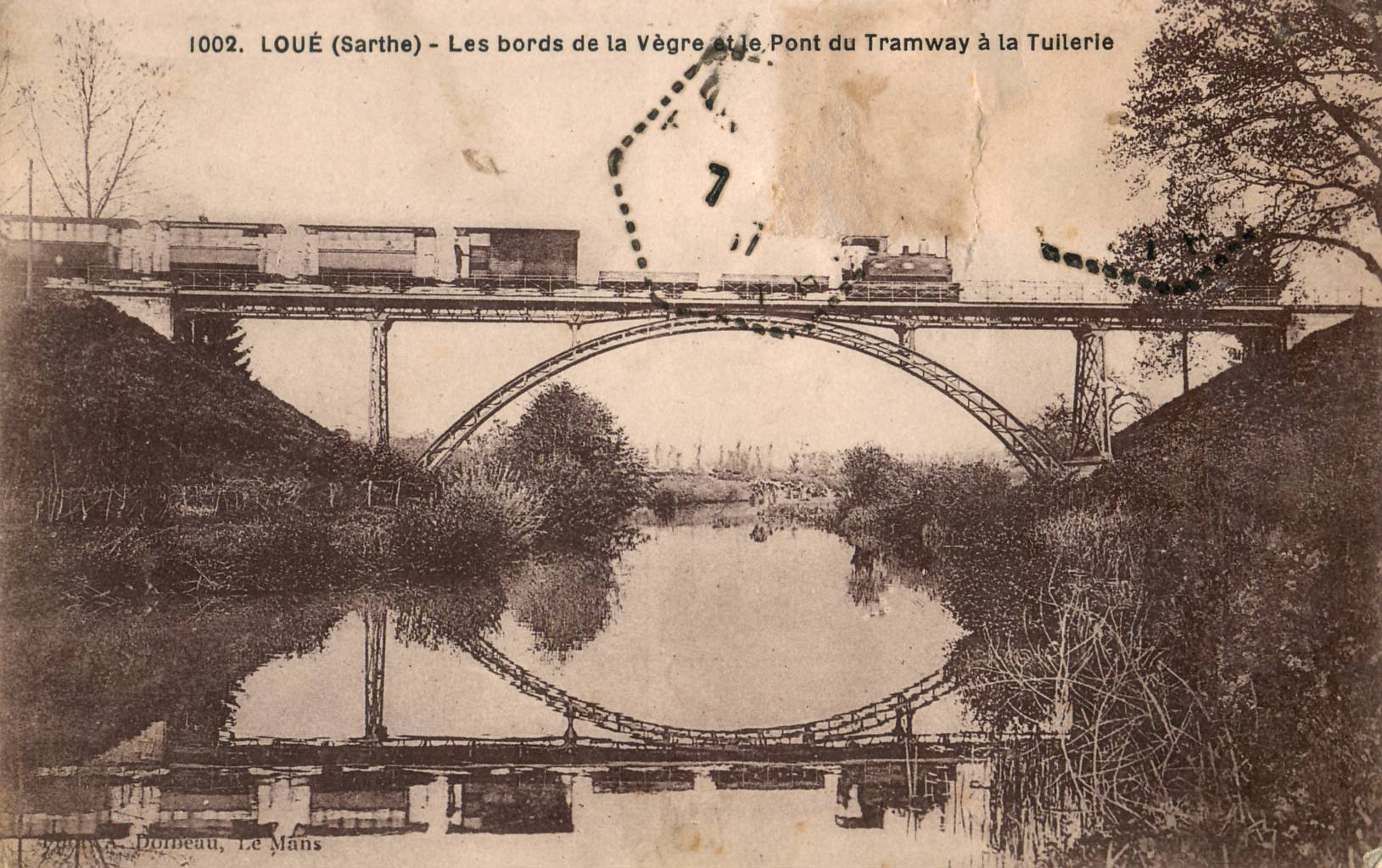
- The vicinity of the Vègre and the Tramway Bridge at La Tuilerie

- Coat of arms
- Location of Loué
- Location within France Location within Pays de la Loire
- Coordinates: 47°59′47″N 0°09′07″W
- Country: France
- Region: Pays de la Loire
- Department: Sarthe
- Arrondissement: La Flèche
- Canton: Loué
- Intercommunality: Loué - Brûlon - Noyen

Government
  - Mayor (2020–2026): Anthony Mussard
- Area^{1}: 15.84 km^{2} (6.12 sq mi)
- Highest elevation: 118 m (387 ft)
- Lowest elevation: 58 m (190 ft)
- Population (2023): 2,156
  - Density: 136.1/km^{2} (352.5/sq mi)
- Demonym(s): Louésien, Louésienne
- Time zone: UTC+01:00 (CET)
  - Summer (DST): UTC+02:00 (CEST)
- INSEE/Postal code: 72168 /72540
- ^{1} French Land Register data, which excludes lakes, ponds, glaciers > 1 km^{2} (0.386 sq mi or 247 acres) and river estuaries.

Loué (French pronunciation: [lwe]) is a commune in the Sarthe department in the region of Pays de la Loire in north-western France.

== Geography ==
The river Vègre flows southwestward through the commune and crosses the town.

== Population ==
Historical population
Year	Pop.	±% p.a.
1968	1,648	—
1975	1,791	+1.20%
1982	1,868	+0.60%
1990	1,929	+0.40%
1999	2,042	+0.63%
2007	2,105	+0.38%
2012	2,184	+0.74%
2017	2,135	−0.45%
2023	2,156	+0.16%
Source: INSEE

== See also ==
- Communes of the Sarthe department
