= Saint-Denis-d'Orques =

- Commune
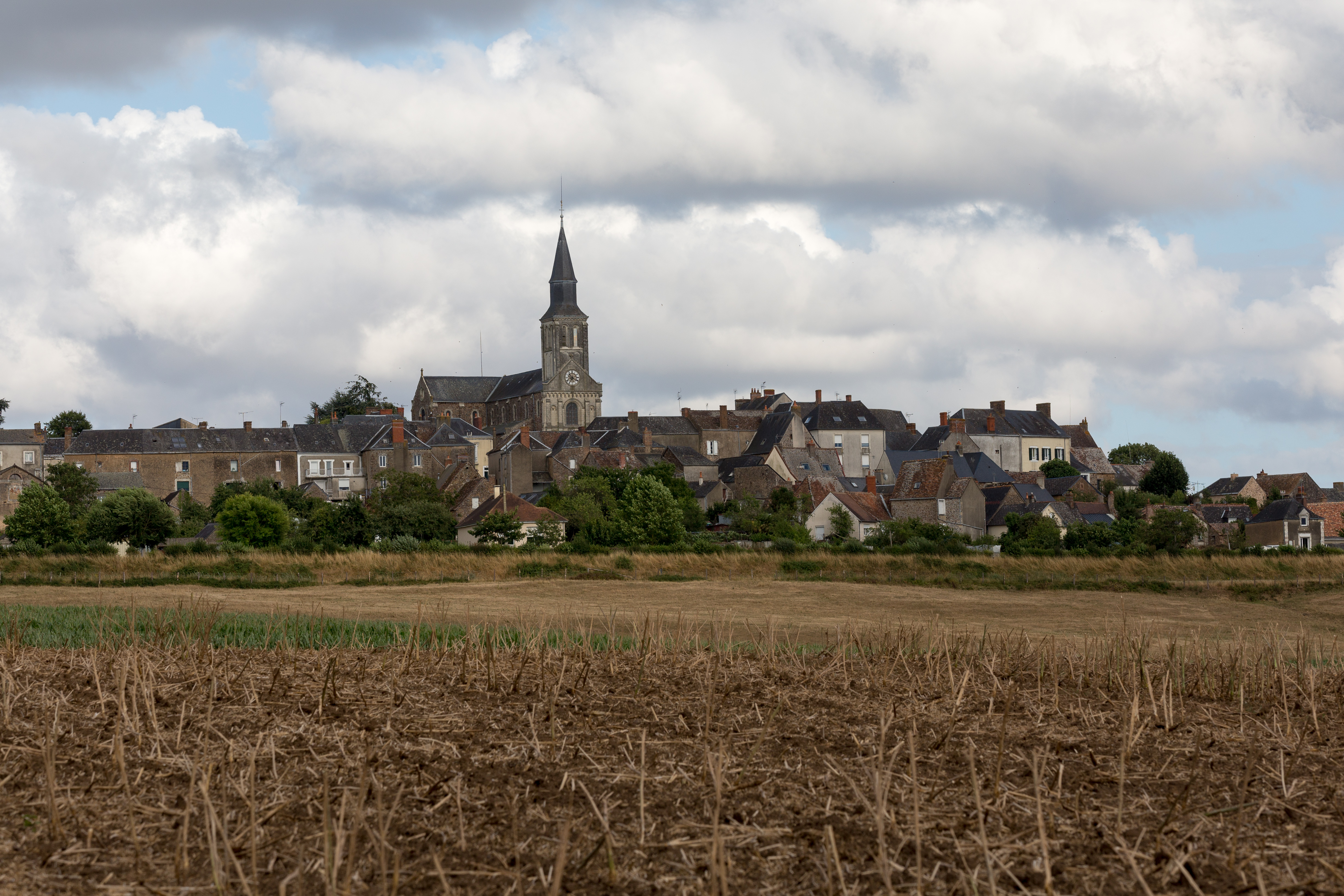
- A general view of Saint-Denis-d'Orques

- Coat of arms
- Location of Saint-Denis-d'Orques
- Location within France Location within Pays de la Loire
- Coordinates: 48°01′41″N 0°16′19″W
- Country: France
- Region: Pays de la Loire
- Department: Sarthe
- Arrondissement: La Flèche
- Canton: Loué
- Intercommunality: Loué - Brûlon - Noyen

Government
  - Mayor (2020–2026): Christian Berger
- Area^{1}: 47.17 km^{2} (18.21 sq mi)
- Highest elevation: 228 m (748 ft)
- Lowest elevation: 59 m (194 ft)
- Population (2023): 760
  - Density: 16/km^{2} (42/sq mi)
- Demonym(s): Dionysien, Dionysienne
- Time zone: UTC+01:00 (CET)
  - Summer (DST): UTC+02:00 (CEST)
- INSEE/Postal code: 72278 /72350
- ^{1} French Land Register data, which excludes lakes, ponds, glaciers > 1 km^{2} (0.386 sq mi or 247 acres) and river estuaries.

Saint-Denis-d'Orques (French pronunciation: [sɛ̃ dəni dɔʁk]) is a commune in the Sarthe department in the region of Pays de la Loire in north-western France.

== See also ==
- Communes of the Sarthe department
