= Neuvillalais =

- Commune
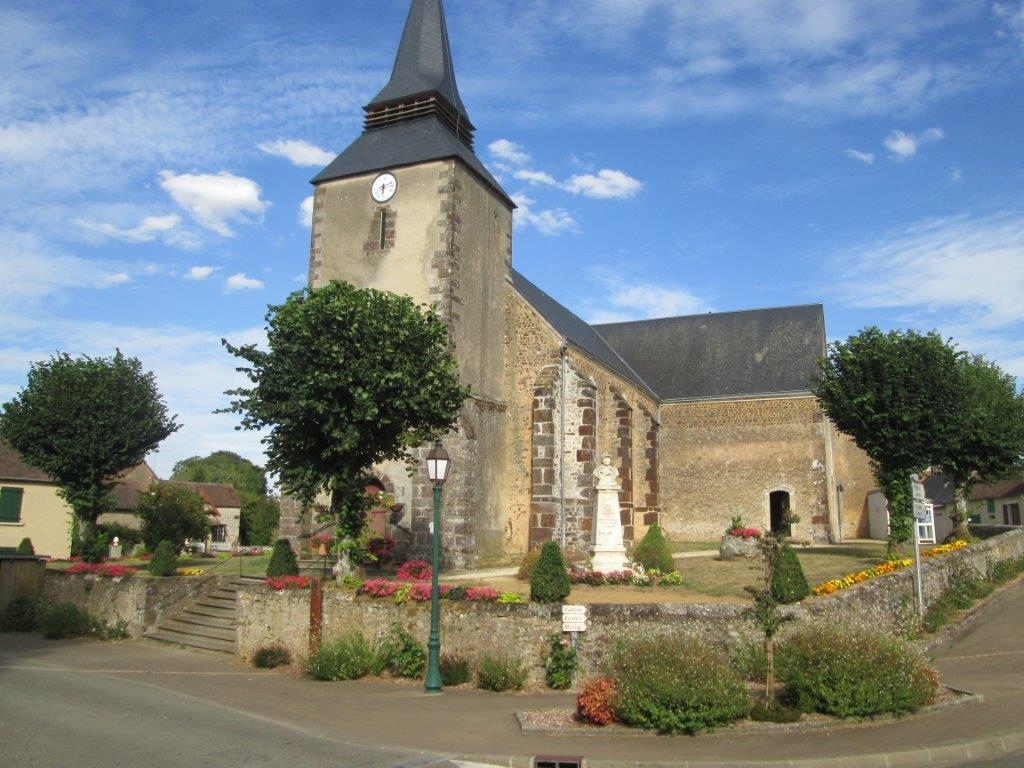
- The church of Neuvillalais
- Location of Neuvillalais
- Location within France Location within Pays de la Loire
- Coordinates: 48°09′26″N 0°00′02″E
- Country: France
- Region: Pays de la Loire
- Department: Sarthe
- Arrondissement: Mamers
- Canton: Loué
- Intercommunality: Champagne Conlinoise et Pays de Sillé

Government
  - Mayor (2020–2026): Jean-Claude Level
- Area^{1}: 19 km^{2} (7.3 sq mi)
- Population (2023): 585
  - Density: 31/km^{2} (80/sq mi)
- Time zone: UTC+01:00 (CET)
  - Summer (DST): UTC+02:00 (CEST)
- INSEE/Postal code: 72216 /72240
- ^{1} French Land Register data, which excludes lakes, ponds, glaciers > 1 km^{2} (0.386 sq mi or 247 acres) and river estuaries.

Neuvillalais (French pronunciation: [nøvilalɛ]) is a commune in the Sarthe department in the region of Pays de la Loire in north-western France.

== See also ==
- Communes of the Sarthe department
