= Canton of Loué =

Coordinates: 47.99°N 0.15°W

The canton of Loué is an administrative division of the Sarthe department, northwestern France. Its borders were modified at the French canton reorganisation which came into effect in March 2015. Its seat is in Loué.

It consists of the following communes:

1. Amné
2. Auvers-sous-Montfaucon
3. Avessé
4. Bernay-Neuvy-en-Champagne
5. Brains-sur-Gée
6. Brûlon
7. Chantenay-Villedieu
8. La Chapelle-Saint-Fray
9. Chassillé
10. Chemiré-en-Charnie
11. Chevillé
12. Conlie
13. Coulans-sur-Gée
14. Crannes-en-Champagne
15. Cures
16. Degré
17. Domfront-en-Champagne
18. Épineu-le-Chevreuil
19. Fontenay-sur-Vègre
20. Joué-en-Charnie
21. Lavardin
22. Longnes
23. Loué
24. Maigné
25. Mareil-en-Champagne
26. Mézières-sous-Lavardin
27. Neuvillalais
28. Noyen-sur-Sarthe
29. Pirmil
30. Poillé-sur-Vègre
31. La Quinte
32. Ruillé-en-Champagne
33. Saint-Christophe-en-Champagne
34. Saint-Denis-d'Orques
35. Sainte-Sabine-sur-Longève
36. Saint-Ouen-en-Champagne
37. Saint-Pierre-des-Bois
38. Saint-Symphorien
39. Tassé
40. Tassillé
41. Tennie
42. Vallon-sur-Gée
43. Viré-en-Champagne
