= Chemiré-en-Charnie =

- Commune
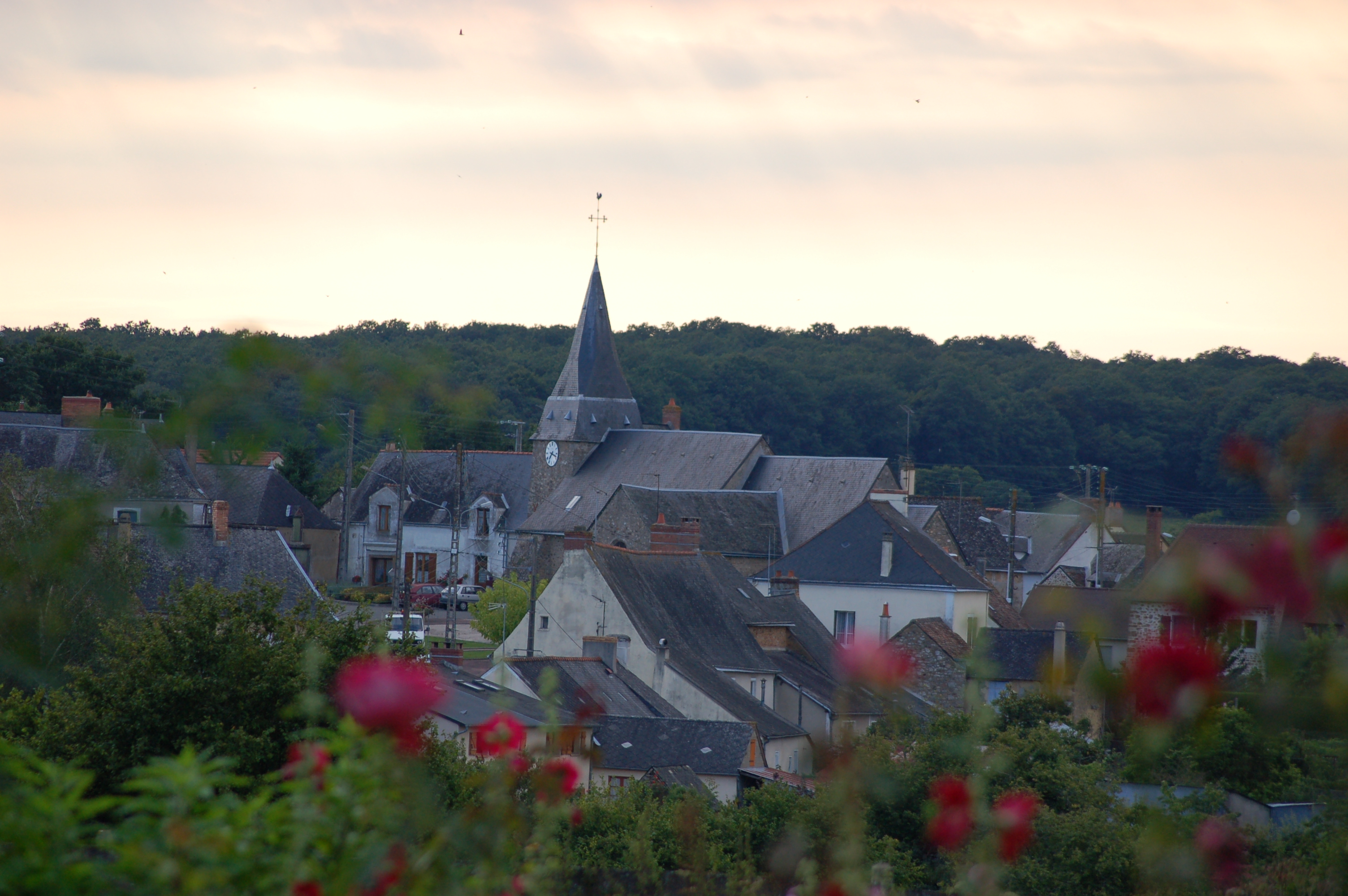
- A general view of Chemiré-en-Charnie
- Location of Chemiré-en-Charnie
- Location within France Location within Pays de la Loire
- Coordinates: 48°03′16″N 0°12′05″W
- Country: France
- Region: Pays de la Loire
- Department: Sarthe
- Arrondissement: La Flèche
- Canton: Loué
- Intercommunality: Loué - Brûlon - Noyen

Government
  - Mayor (2020–2026): Jean-Paul Coquille
- Area^{1}: 11.47 km^{2} (4.43 sq mi)
- Elevation: 135 m (443 ft)
- Population (2023): 212
  - Density: 18.5/km^{2} (47.9/sq mi)
- Demonym(s): Chemiréens, Chemiréenne
- Time zone: UTC+01:00 (CET)
  - Summer (DST): UTC+02:00 (CEST)
- INSEE/Postal code: 72074 /72540
- ^{1} French Land Register data, which excludes lakes, ponds, glaciers > 1 km^{2} (0.386 sq mi or 247 acres) and river estuaries.

Chemiré-en-Charnie (French pronunciation: [ʃəmiʁe ɑ̃ ʃaʁni]) is a commune in the Sarthe department in the Pays de la Loire region in north-western France.

== See also ==
- Communes of the Sarthe department
