= Joué-en-Charnie =

- Commune
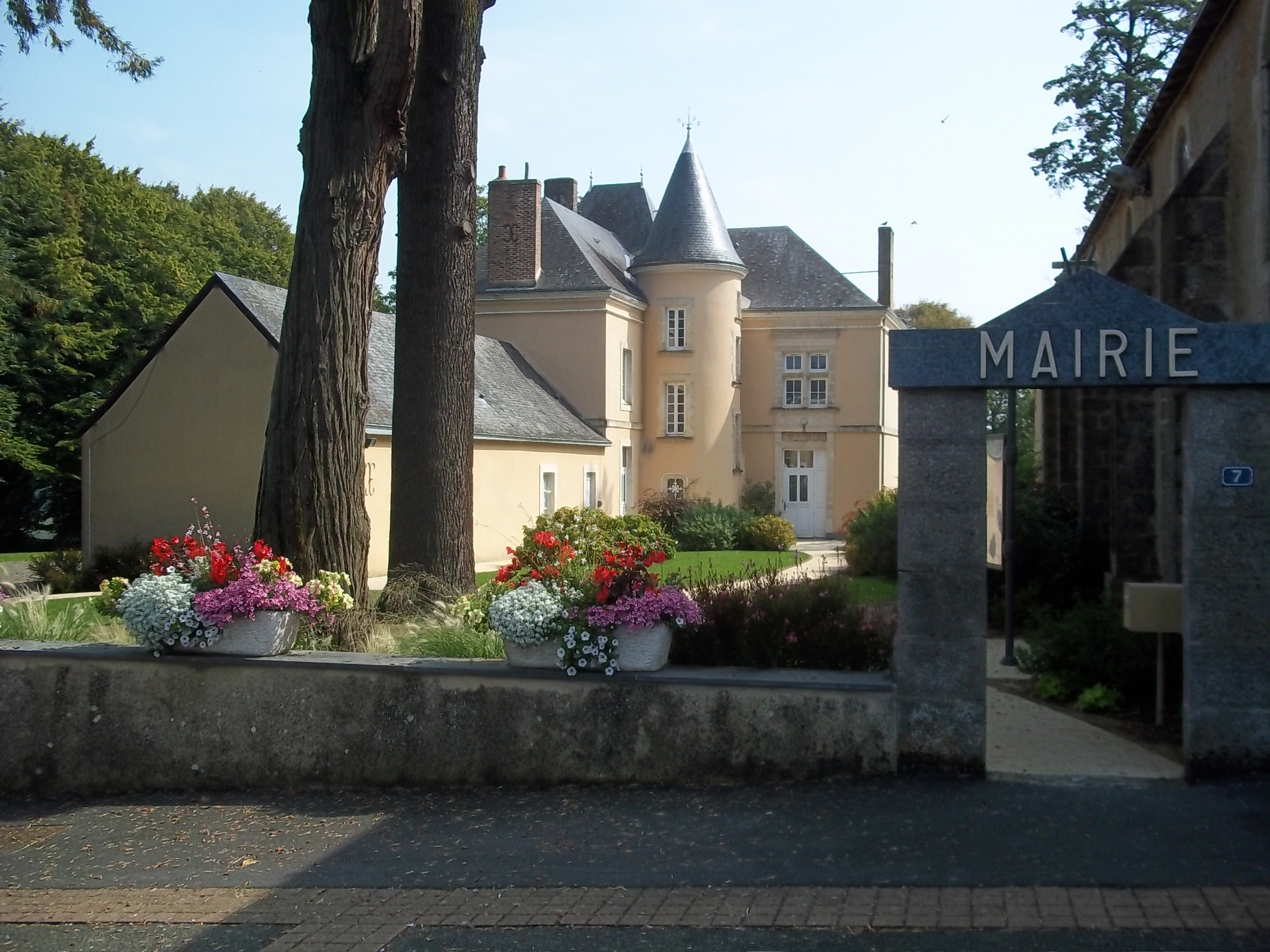
- The town hall of Joué-en-Charnie
- Location of Joué-en-Charnie
- Location within France Location within Pays de la Loire
- Coordinates: 48°01′03″N 0°11′24″W
- Country: France
- Region: Pays de la Loire
- Department: Sarthe
- Arrondissement: La Flèche
- Canton: Loué
- Intercommunality: Loué - Brûlon - Noyen

Government
  - Mayor (2020–2026): Régis Noir
- Area^{1}: 23.6 km^{2} (9.1 sq mi)
- Highest elevation: 165 m (541 ft)
- Lowest elevation: 62 m (203 ft)
- Population (2023): 589
  - Density: 25.0/km^{2} (64.6/sq mi)
- Demonym(s): Jouesien, Jouesienne
- Time zone: UTC+01:00 (CET)
  - Summer (DST): UTC+02:00 (CEST)
- INSEE/Postal code: 72149 /72540
- ^{1} French Land Register data, which excludes lakes, ponds, glaciers > 1 km^{2} (0.386 sq mi or 247 acres) and river estuaries.

Joué-en-Charnie (French pronunciation: [ʒwe ɑ̃ ʃaʁni]) is a commune in the Sarthe department in the region of Pays de la Loire in north-western France.

== See also ==
- Communes of the Sarthe department
