= Tassé =

- Commune
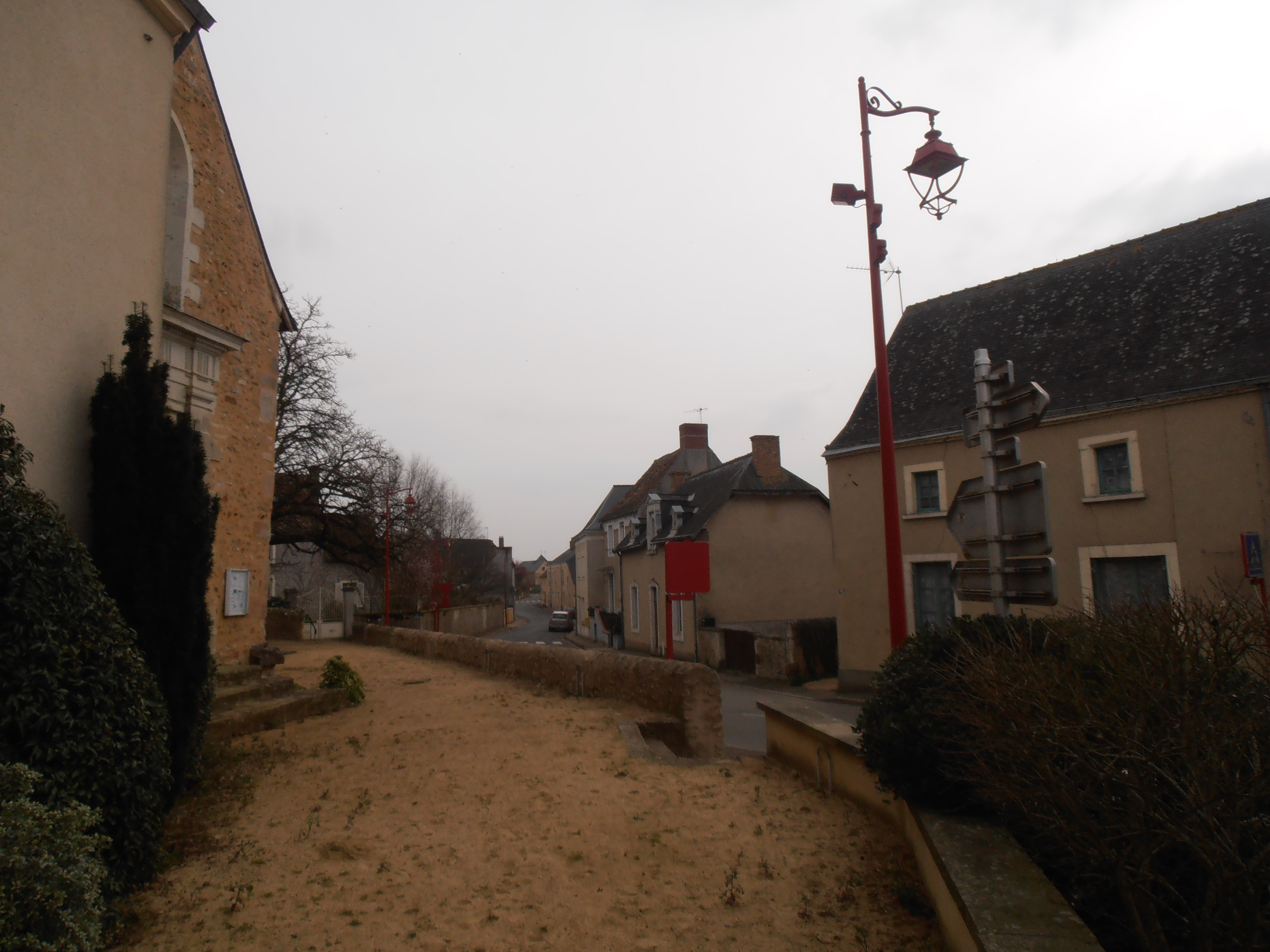
- The centre of Tassé
- Location of Tassé
- Location within France Location within Pays de la Loire
- Coordinates: 47°53′23″N 0°08′09″W
- Country: France
- Region: Pays de la Loire
- Department: Sarthe
- Arrondissement: La Flèche
- Canton: Loué
- Intercommunality: CC Loué-Brûlon-Noyen

Government
  - Mayor (2020–2026): Catherine Lemercier
- Area^{1}: 10.8 km^{2} (4.2 sq mi)
- Population (2023): 287
  - Density: 26.6/km^{2} (68.8/sq mi)
- Time zone: UTC+01:00 (CET)
  - Summer (DST): UTC+02:00 (CEST)
- INSEE/Postal code: 72347 /72430
- ^{1} French Land Register data, which excludes lakes, ponds, glaciers > 1 km^{2} (0.386 sq mi or 247 acres) and river estuaries.

Tassé (French pronunciation: [tase]) is a commune in the Sarthe department in the region of Pays de la Loire in north-western France.

== See also ==
- Communes of the Sarthe department
