= La Quinte =

- Commune
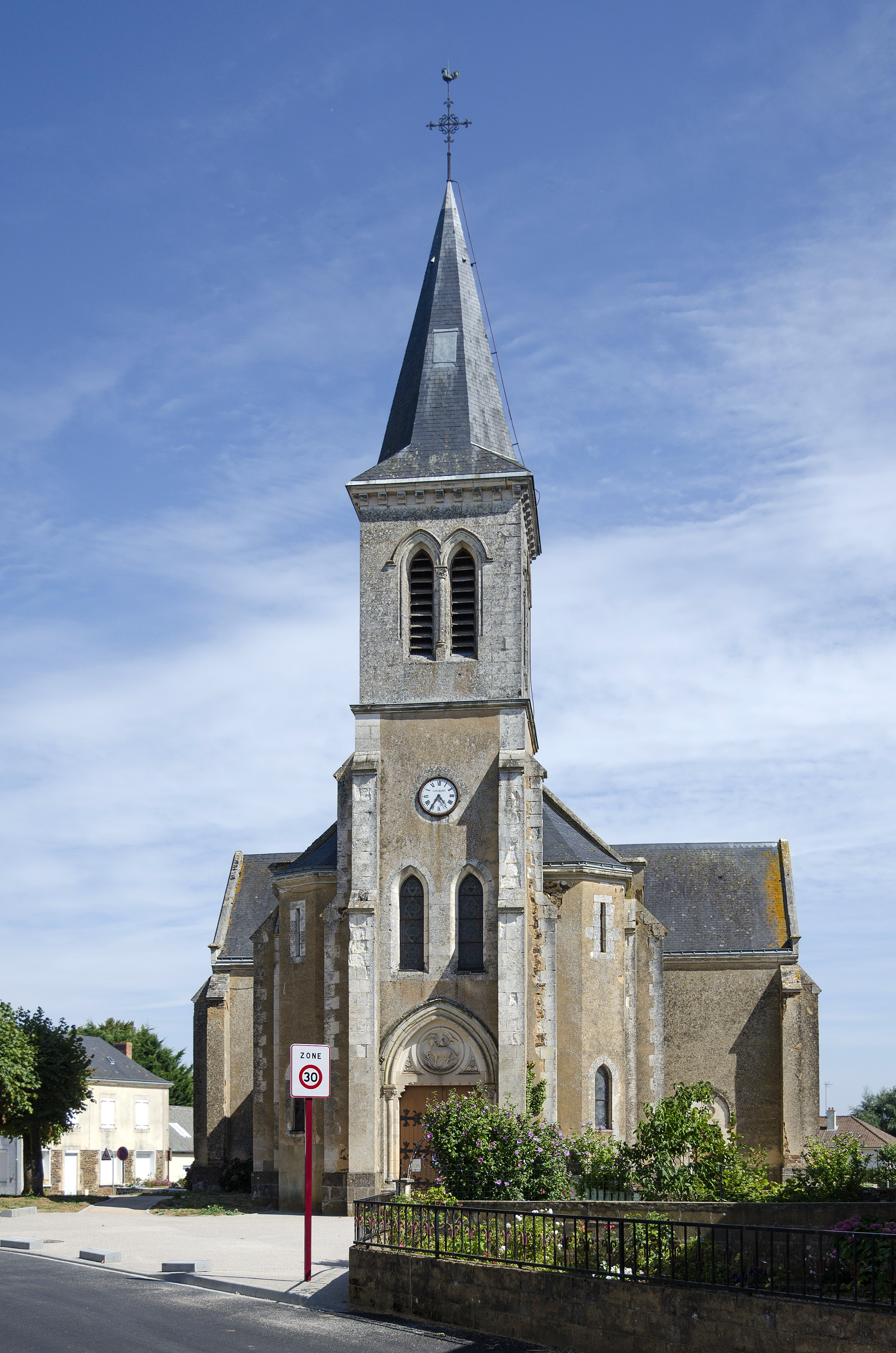
- The church of Notre-Dame-de-la-Visitation

- Coat of arms
- Location of La Quinte
- Location within France Location within Pays de la Loire
- Coordinates: 48°03′34″N 0°02′19″E
- Country: France
- Region: Pays de la Loire
- Department: Sarthe
- Arrondissement: Mamers
- Canton: Loué
- Intercommunality: Champagne Conlinoise et Pays de Sillé

Government
  - Mayor (2020–2026): Jean-Jacques Oreiller
- Area^{1}: 8.81 km^{2} (3.40 sq mi)
- Highest elevation: 145 m (476 ft)
- Lowest elevation: 82 m (269 ft)
- Population (2023): 823
  - Density: 93.4/km^{2} (242/sq mi)
- Demonym(s): Quintois, Quintoise
- Time zone: UTC+01:00 (CET)
  - Summer (DST): UTC+02:00 (CEST)
- INSEE/Postal code: 72249 /72550
- ^{1} French Land Register data, which excludes lakes, ponds, glaciers > 1 km^{2} (0.386 sq mi or 247 acres) and river estuaries.

La Quinte (French pronunciation: [la kɛ̃t]) is a commune in the Sarthe department in the region of Pays de la Loire in north-western France.

== See also ==
- Communes of the Sarthe department
