= Domfront-en-Champagne =

- Commune
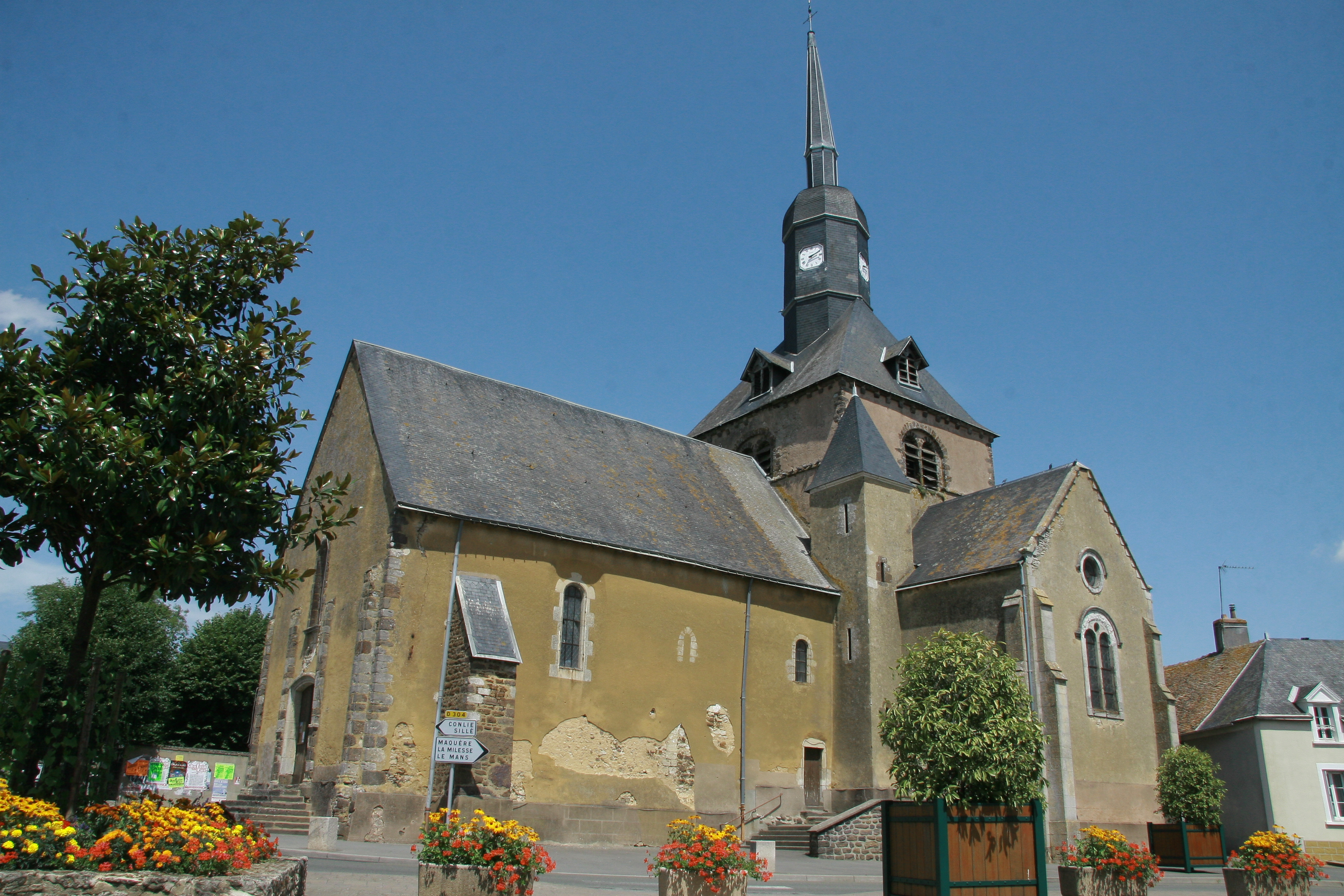
- The church of Saint Front
- Location of Domfront-en-Champagne
- Location within France Location within Pays de la Loire
- Coordinates: 48°06′20″N 0°01′35″E
- Country: France
- Region: Pays de la Loire
- Department: Sarthe
- Arrondissement: Mamers
- Canton: Loué
- Intercommunality: Champagne Conlinoise et Pays de Sillé

Government
  - Mayor (2020–2026): Patrice Guyomard
- Area^{1}: 20.97 km^{2} (8.10 sq mi)
- Population (2023): 1,069
  - Density: 50.98/km^{2} (132.0/sq mi)
- Demonym(s): Domfrontais, Domfrontaise
- Time zone: UTC+01:00 (CET)
  - Summer (DST): UTC+02:00 (CEST)
- INSEE/Postal code: 72119 /72240
- ^{1} French Land Register data, which excludes lakes, ponds, glaciers > 1 km^{2} (0.386 sq mi or 247 acres) and river estuaries.

Domfront-en-Champagne (French pronunciation: [dɔ̃fʁɔ̃ ɑ̃ ʃɑ̃paɲ], before 1962: Domfront) is a commune in the Sarthe department in the Pays de la Loire region in north-western France.

== See also ==
- Communes of the Sarthe department
