= Longnes, Sarthe =

Longnes
- Commune
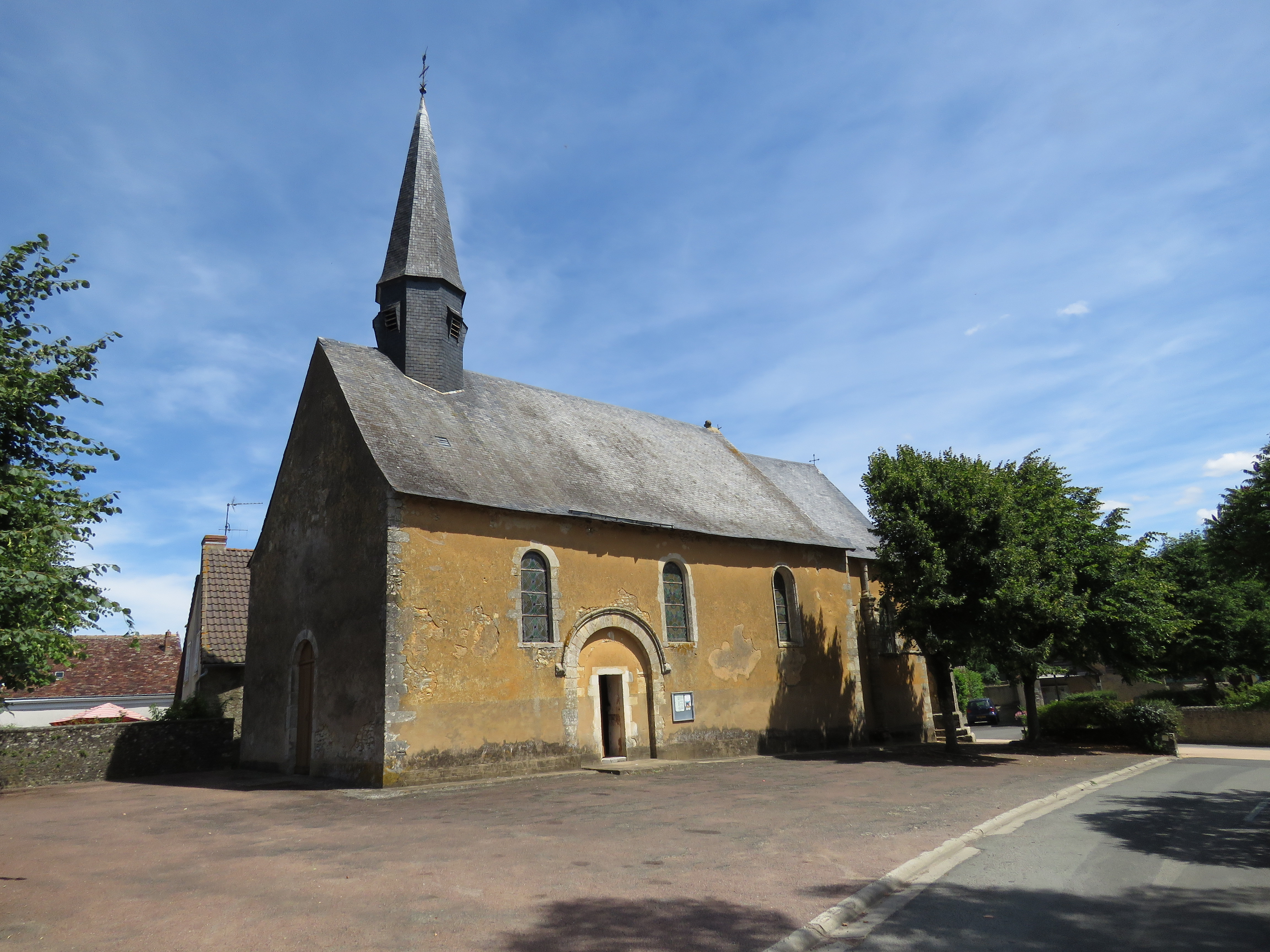
- The church in Longnes
- Location of Longnes
- Location within France Location within Pays de la Loire
- Coordinates: 48°01′09″N 0°04′40″W
- Country: France
- Region: Pays de la Loire
- Department: Sarthe
- Arrondissement: La Flèche
- Canton: Loué
- Intercommunality: Loué - Brûlon - Noyen

Government
  - Mayor (2020–2026): Stéphane Cribier
- Area^{1}: 6.5 km^{2} (2.5 sq mi)
- Population (2023): 286
  - Density: 44/km^{2} (110/sq mi)
- Time zone: UTC+01:00 (CET)
  - Summer (DST): UTC+02:00 (CEST)
- INSEE/Postal code: 72166 /72540
- ^{1} French Land Register data, which excludes lakes, ponds, glaciers > 1 km^{2} (0.386 sq mi or 247 acres) and river estuaries.

Longnes is a commune in the Sarthe department in the region of Pays de la Loire in north-western France.

The closest airport to Longnes is Angers Airport (53 km).

== See also ==
- Communes of the Sarthe department
