= Degré =

- Commune
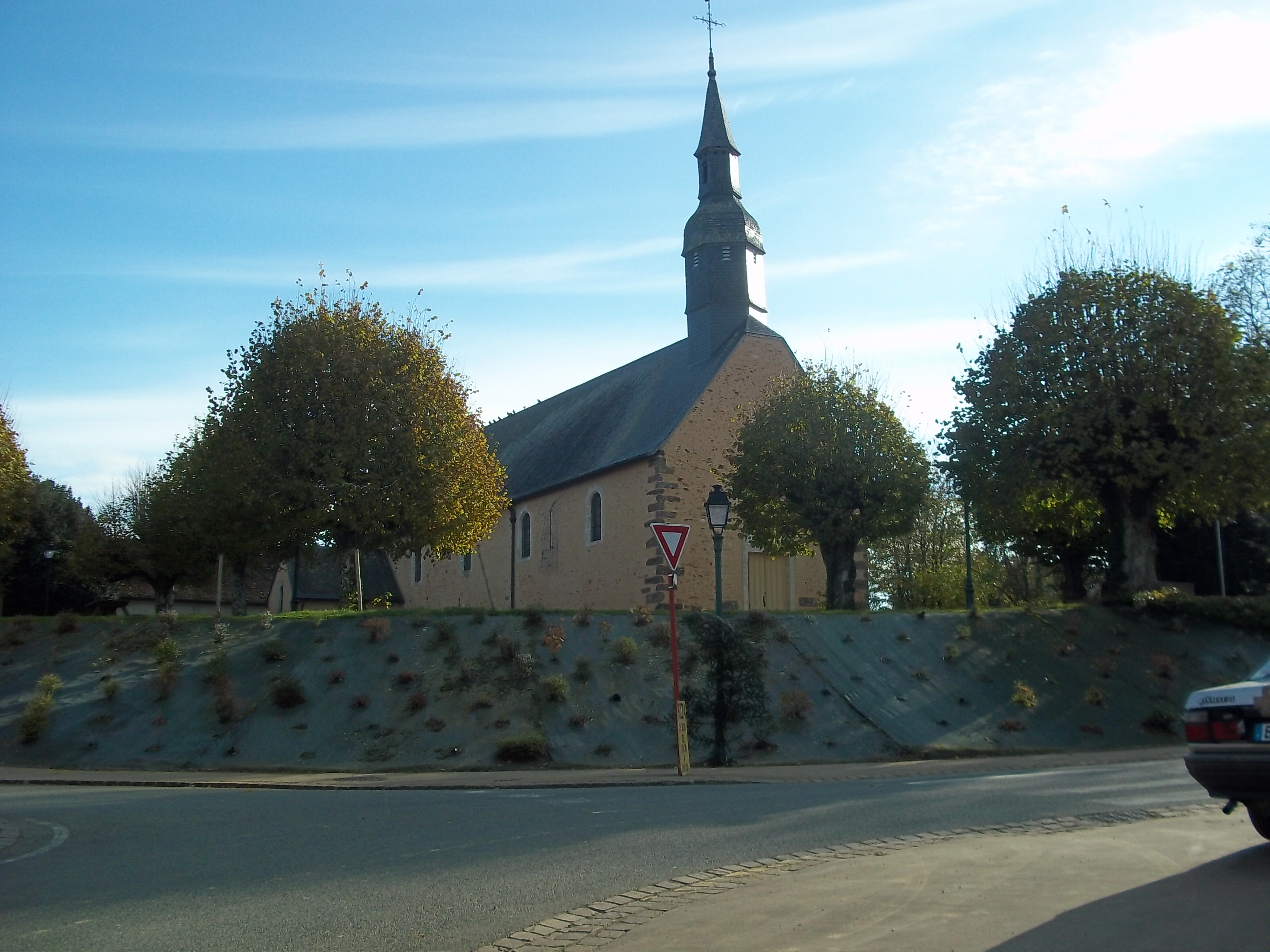
- The church of Saint Martin
- Location of Degré
- Location within France Location within Pays de la Loire
- Coordinates: 48°03′00″N 0°04′11″E
- Country: France
- Region: Pays de la Loire
- Department: Sarthe
- Arrondissement: Mamers
- Canton: Loué
- Intercommunality: Champagne Conlinoise et Pays de Sillé

Government
  - Mayor (2020–2026): Jean-Paul Blot
- Area^{1}: 9.9 km^{2} (3.8 sq mi)
- Population (2023): 751
  - Density: 76/km^{2} (200/sq mi)
- Demonym(s): Degréens, Degréenne
- Time zone: UTC+01:00 (CET)
  - Summer (DST): UTC+02:00 (CEST)
- INSEE/Postal code: 72113 /72550
- ^{1} French Land Register data, which excludes lakes, ponds, glaciers > 1 km^{2} (0.386 sq mi or 247 acres) and river estuaries.

Degré (French pronunciation: [dəɡʁe]) is a commune in the Sarthe department in the Pays de la Loire region in north-western France.

== See also ==
- Communes of the Sarthe department
