= Auvers-sous-Montfaucon =

- Commune
- Location of Auvers-sous-Montfaucon
- Location within France Location within Pays de la Loire
- Coordinates: 48°00′22″N 0°04′10″W
- Country: France
- Region: Pays de la Loire
- Department: Sarthe
- Arrondissement: La Flèche
- Canton: Loué
- Intercommunality: CC Loué-Brûlon-Noyen

Government
  - Mayor (2020–2026): Stephane Bru
- Area^{1}: 8 km^{2} (3.1 sq mi)
- Population (2023): 231
  - Density: 29/km^{2} (75/sq mi)
- Demonym(s): Auversois, Auversoise
- Time zone: UTC+01:00 (CET)
  - Summer (DST): UTC+02:00 (CEST)
- INSEE/Postal code: 72017 /72540
- ^{1} French Land Register data, which excludes lakes, ponds, glaciers > 1 km^{2} (0.386 sq mi or 247 acres) and river estuaries.

Auvers-sous-Montfaucon is a commune in the Sarthe department in the region of Pays de la Loire in north-western France.

== See also ==
- Communes of the Sarthe department
