= Volnay =

Volnay is the name of two communes in France:

- Volnay, Côte-d'Or
- Volnay, Sarthe

It may also refer to:

- Volnay AOC, a wine classification based on the town of the same name in Côte-d'Or
