= Saint-Mars-de-Locquenay =

- Part of Val-de-la-Hune
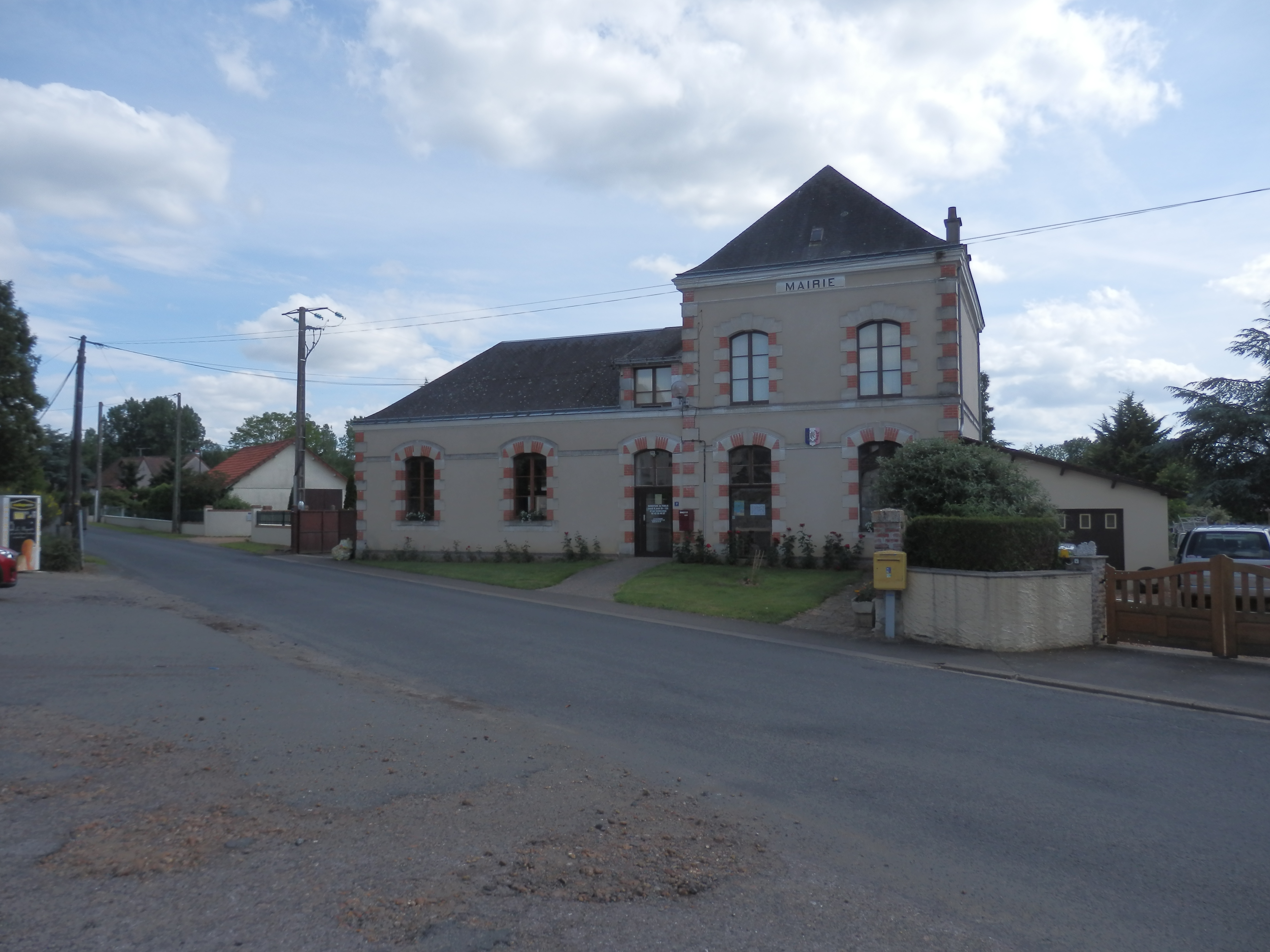
- The town hall of Saint-Mars-de-Locquenay
- Location of Saint-Mars-de-Locquenay
- Location within France Location within Pays de la Loire
- Coordinates: 47°55′46″N 0°29′06″E
- Country: France
- Region: Pays de la Loire
- Department: Sarthe
- Arrondissement: Mamers
- Canton: Saint-Calais
- Commune: Val-de-la-Hune
- Area^{1}: 21.74 km^{2} (8.39 sq mi)
- Highest elevation: 167 m (548 ft)
- Lowest elevation: 102 m (335 ft)
- Population (2022): 555
  - Density: 25.5/km^{2} (66.1/sq mi)
- Demonym(s): Loquenaysien, Loquenaysienne
- Time zone: UTC+01:00 (CET)
  - Summer (DST): UTC+02:00 (CEST)
- Postal code: 72440
- ^{1} French Land Register data, which excludes lakes, ponds, glaciers > 1 km^{2} (0.386 sq mi or 247 acres) and river estuaries.

Saint-Mars-de-Locquenay (French pronunciation: [sɛ̃ maʁ də lɔknɛ]) is a former commune in the Sarthe department in the region of Pays de la Loire in north-western France. On 1 January 2025, it was merged into the new commune of Val-de-la-Hune.

== See also ==
- Communes of the Sarthe department
