= Val-de-la-Hune =

- Commune
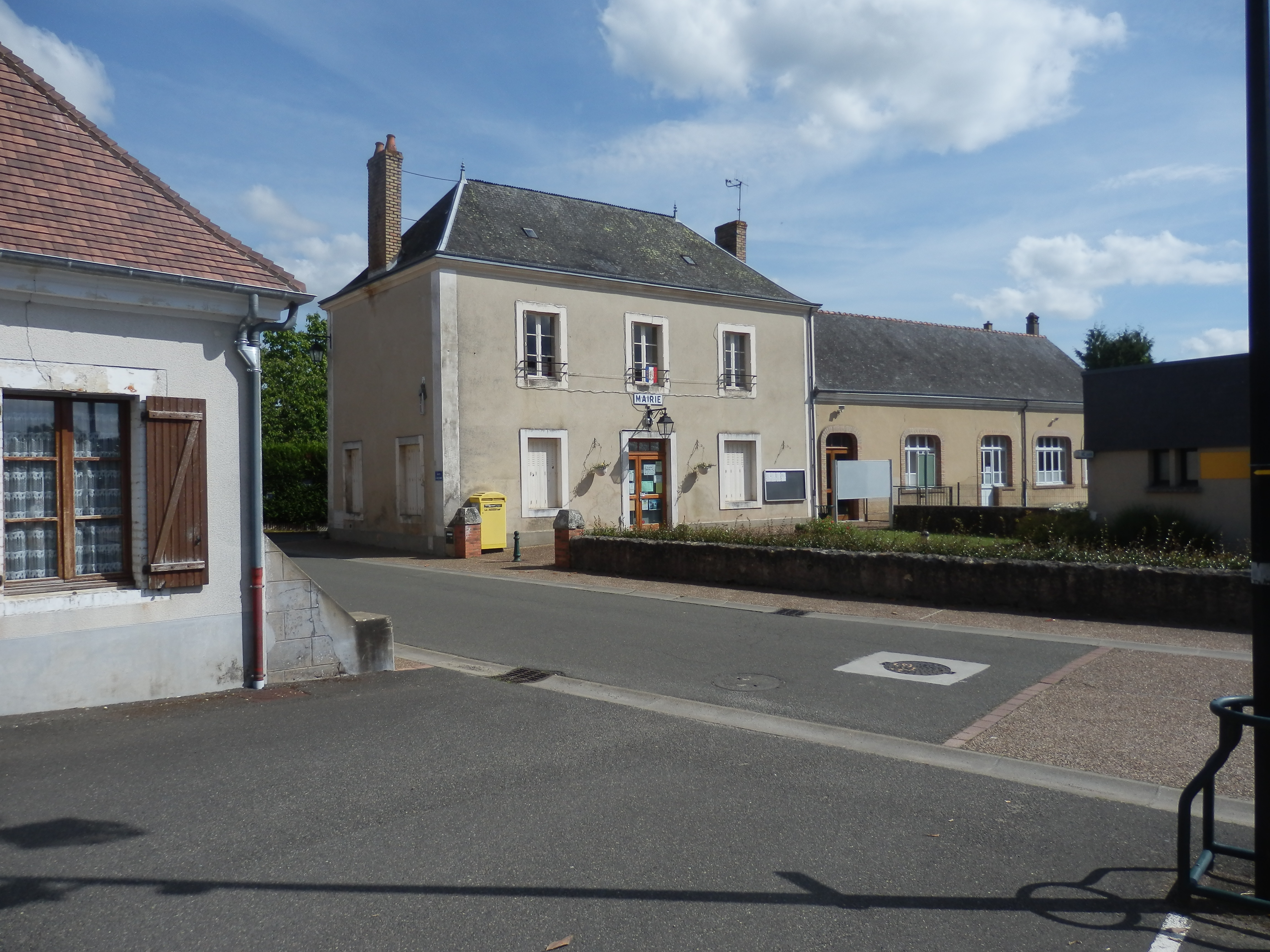
- The town hall of Volnay
- Location of Val-de-la-Hune
- Location within France Location within Pays de la Loire
- Coordinates: 47°55′59″N 0°28′06″E
- Country: France
- Region: Pays de la Loire
- Department: Sarthe
- Arrondissement: Mamers
- Canton: Saint-Calais
- Intercommunality: CC Le Gesnois Bilurien
- Area^{1}: 41.62 km^{2} (16.07 sq mi)
- Highest elevation: 167 m (548 ft)
- Lowest elevation: 80 m (260 ft)
- Population (2023): 1,521
  - Density: 36.54/km^{2} (94.65/sq mi)
- Time zone: UTC+01:00 (CET)
  - Summer (DST): UTC+02:00 (CEST)
- INSEE/Postal code: 72382 /72440
- ^{1} French Land Register data, which excludes lakes, ponds, glaciers > 1 km^{2} (0.386 sq mi or 247 acres) and river estuaries.

Val-de-la-Hune (French pronunciation: [val də la yn]) is a commune in the Sarthe department in the region of Pays de la Loire in north-western France. It was formed on 1 January 2025, with the merger of Volnay and Saint-Mars-de-Locquenay.

== See also ==
- Communes of the Sarthe department
