= Volnay, Sarthe =

Volnay
- Part of Val-de-la-Hune
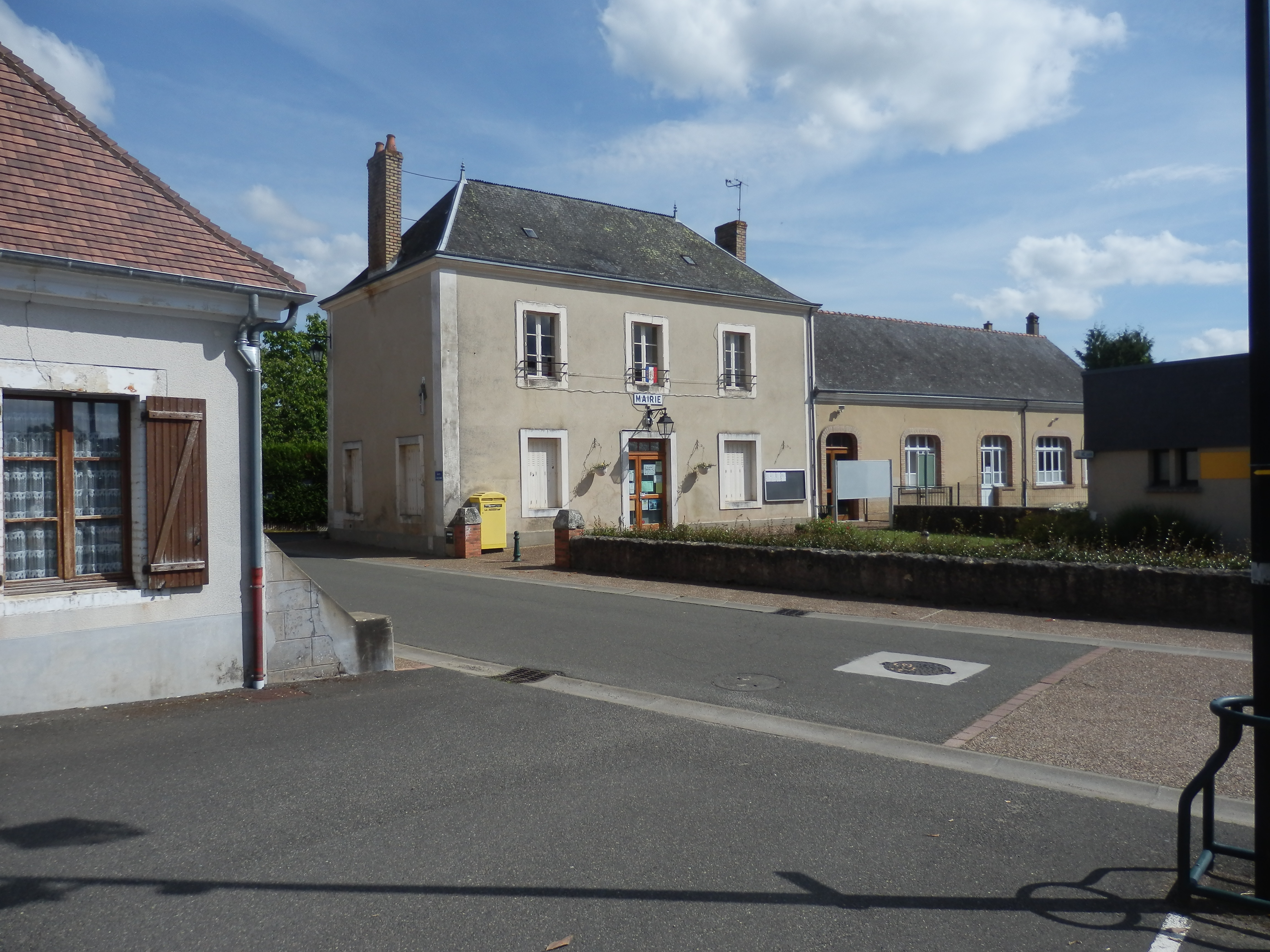
- The town hall of Volnay
- Location of Volnay
- Location within France Location within Pays de la Loire
- Coordinates: 47°55′59″N 0°28′06″E
- Country: France
- Region: Pays de la Loire
- Department: Sarthe
- Arrondissement: Mamers
- Canton: Saint-Calais
- Commune: Val-de-la-Hune
- Area^{1}: 19.84 km^{2} (7.66 sq mi)
- Highest elevation: 154 m (505 ft)
- Lowest elevation: 80 m (260 ft)
- Population (2022): 971
  - Density: 48.9/km^{2} (127/sq mi)
- Demonym(s): Volnaysien, Volnaysienne
- Time zone: UTC+01:00 (CET)
  - Summer (DST): UTC+02:00 (CEST)
- Postal code: 72440
- ^{1} French Land Register data, which excludes lakes, ponds, glaciers > 1 km^{2} (0.386 sq mi or 247 acres) and river estuaries.

Volnay (French pronunciation: [vɔlnɛ]) is a former commune in the Sarthe department in the region of Pays de la Loire in north-western France. On 1 January 2025, it was merged into the new commune of Val-de-la-Hune.

== See also ==
- Communes of the Sarthe department
