= 2020–21 Coupe de France preliminary rounds, Auvergne-Rhône-Alpes =

The 2020–21 Coupe de France preliminary rounds, Auvergne-Rhône-Alpes was the qualifying competition to decide which teams from the leagues of the Auvergne-Rhône-Alpes region of France took part in the main competition from the seventh round.

A total of sixteen teams qualified from the Auvergne-Rhône-Alpes Preliminary rounds. In 2019–20, FC Limonest Saint-Didier progressed the furthest in the main competition, reaching the round of 16, before losing to Dijon 2–1 after extra time.

== Schedule ==
A total of 945 teams from the region entered the competition. The draw, made on 27 July 2020, required a Preliminary round, which took place on 30 August 2020, and which saw 370 teams enter the competition, from the District leagues, division 2 and below. The ties for the first round on 6 September 2020 were also preassigned, which saw a further 475 teams enter, from the higher District leagues and Regional 3. The draw for the second round was made on 3 September 2020, and saw the entry of 48 Regional 2 teams.

The third round draw, which saw the 27 Regional 1 teams and 10 Championnat National 3 teams enter, (Note: FC Vaulx-en-Velin were given a ban for the competition in January 2020.) was made on 15 September 2020. The fourth round draw, which saw the Championnat National 2 teams enter, was made on 24 September 2020. The fifth round draw, featuring the teams from Championnat National, was made on 8 October 2020. The sixth round draw was made on 22 October 2020.

=== Preliminary round ===
These matches were played on 29 and 30 August 2020.

Preliminary round results: Auvergne-Rhône-Alpes
Tie no	Home team (tier)	Score	Away team (tier)
1.	CS Targetois (13)	0–2	US Bien-Assis (11)
2.	OC Monetay-sur-Allier (11)	0–0 (3–4 p)	AS Chassenard Luneau (11)
3.	CS Thielois (12)	0–5	AS Neuilly-le-Réal (11)
4.	CS Chantelle (12)	1–0	AS Rongères (11)
5.	AS Sanssat (12)	3–1	US Saulcet-Le Theil (11)
6.	US Bussetoise (12)	1–2	US Abrest (11)
7.	AF Archignat-Treignat (12)	2–3	US Toque Huriel (11)
8.	US Agongeoise (12)	1–6	FR Pouzy-Mésangy (11)
9.	Bellerive-Brugheas Football (11)	2–5	FC Hauterive (11)
10.	AS Montluçon Châtelard (11)	0–2	CS Vaux-Estivareilles (11)
11.	SC Ygrandais (11)	1–1 (4–5 p)	AS Cérilly (11)
12.	FC Est Allier (11)	0–1	Espoir Molinetois (11)
13.	AS Salignoise (11)	5–1	AS Mercy-Chapeau (11)
14.	US Coeur Allier (12)	0–1	Montluçon FC (11)
15.	ES Saint-Étienne-de-Vicq/Bost (12)	1–3	Montagne Bourbonnaise FC (11)
16.	US Giou de Mamou (13)	2–4	ES Roannaise (12)
17.	FC Hauts de Cère (12)	1–3	ES Vebret-Ydes (11)
18.	FC Albepierre-Bredons (12)	2–3	Saint-Georges SL (11)
19.	Entente Anglards-Salers (12)	1–4	US Haut Célé (11)
20.	AS Naucelles (12)	1–1 (1–4 p)	US Chaussenac (11)
21.	US Loupiac Saint-Christophe (12)	0–4	US Besse (11)
22.	AS Saint-Poncy (12)	0–4	ES Margeride (11)
23.	AA Saint-Front (13)	2–2 (4–3 p)	US Saint-Victor-Malescours (11)
24.	FC Venteuges (12)	1–3	AC Auzon-Azérat (10)
25.	AS Saint-Pal-de-Chalencon (12)	1–2	AS Beauzac (11)
26.	AS Saugues (11)	4–0	FC Vézézoux (10)
27.	US Lantriac (11)	3–5	Vigilante Saint-Pal-de-Mons (10)
28.	AS Ally-Mercoeur (11)	1–1 (11–10 p)	AS Chadron-Saint-Martin (11)
29.	AS Mazet-Chambon (11)	3–1	Aiguilhe FC (11)
30.	AS Pertuis (11)	1–0	FC Aurec (10)
31.	US Ménétrol (12)	3–1	ES Champeyroux-Surat-Les Martres (11)
32.	Sancy Artense Foot (11)	1–2	ES Couze Pavin (11)
33.	Pérignat FC (11)	3–4	AS Moissat (10) (Note: AS Moissat replaced FC Mezel who were in the original draw.)
34.	FC Charbonnier-les-Mines (12)	2–2 (1–3 p)	AS Saint-Germain-Le Vernet (11)
35.	CS Saint-Anthème (12)	5–2	AS Cunlhat (11)
36.	Entente CAS Durollien GF Portugais (11)	0–4	CS Pont-de-Dore (10)
37.	US Loubeyrat (11)	1–3	ACS Cappadoce (11)
38.	AS Saint-Ours (10)	1–3	AS Royat (10) (Note: AS Royat replaced US Vernines who were in the original draw.)
39.	US Beauregard-Vendon (12)	1–1 (3–2 p)	FF Chappes (11)
40.	Haute Combraille Foot (11)	1–3	US Menat-Neuf-Eglise (11)
41.	US Saint-Sylvestre-Pragoulin (13)	1–5	US Saint-Gervaisienne (10)
42.	AS Roche-Blanche FC (11)	5–0	ASPTT Clermont-Ferrand (11)
43.	US Messeix Bourg-Lastic (11)	1–0	ES Saint-Sauves Tauves (11)
44.	Entente Charblot (11)	5–1	AS Portugais Riom (11)
45.	FC Thiers Auvergne (11)	2–0	ES Saint-Maurice-ès-Allier (11)
46.	Saint-Amant et Tallende SC (12)	3–2	FC Saint-Julien-de-Coppel (10)
47.	FC Bromont-Lamothe/Montfermy (11)	4–3	US Chapdes-Beaufort (10)
48.	US Combronde (12)	3–0	RC Saint-Clément-de-Régnat (10)
49.	ES Thuret (11)	1–2	RS Luzillat-Charnat-Vinzelles (10)
50.	ES Volcans Malauzat (11)	2–0	RC Laqueuille (11)
51.	FC Mas-Rillier (12)	4–1	FC Balan (12)
52.	FC Priay (12)	0–2	JS Bresse Dombes (12)
53.	Côtière Meximieux Villieu (12)	3–1 (Note: Tie reversed from original draw.)	FC Montluel (13)
54.	FC Serrières-Villebois (11)	5–3	Olympique Saint-Denis-lès-Bourg (11)
55.	CO Plateau (12)	6–3	AS Colomieu (12)
56.	US Dombes-Chalamont (11)	2–0	CSJ Châtillonnaise (11)
57.	US Saint-Cyr	0–3 (Note: Tie won by means of forfeit.)	AS Chaveyriat-Chanoz (11)
58.	AS Guéreins-Genouilleux (11)	1–1 (2–0 p)	Foot Trois Rivières (11)
59.	US Veyziat (11)	4–2	Entente Saint-Martin-du-Frêne/Maillat/Combe du Val (11)
60.	FC Nurieux-Volognat (12)	2–2 (4–2 p)	AS Hautecourt-Romanèche (11)
61.	CS Chevroux (11)	1–1 (6–5 p)	ES Cormoranche (11)
62.	AS Vertrieu (12)	1–4	Entente Bas Bugey Rhône (11)
63.	FC Veyle-Vieux-Jonc (12)	1–3	FC Bord de Veyle (11)
64.	CS Valromey (13)	0–4	Valserine FC (11)
65.	AS Saint-Étienne-sur-Chalaronne (13)	0–5	SC Mille Étangs (12)
66.	AS Anglefort (12)	2–3	AS Travailleurs Turcs Oyonnax (11)
67.	ES Trèfle (12)	1–3	FC Félines-Saint-Cyr-Peaugres (11)
68.	FC Saint-Restitut (13)	1–1 (4–2 p)	FC Sauzet (12)
69.	US Drôme Provence (12)	7–2	FC La Coucourde (12)
70.	US Veyras (13)	2–2 (2–4 p)	AS Homenetmen Bourg-lès Valence (11)
71.	FC Rambertois (11)	3–2	FC Alboussière (12)
72.	Glun FC (13)	0–2	FC Bren (12)
73.	CS Malataverne (13)	0–4	US Lussas (12)
74.	AS Vanséenne (13)	2–1	FC Saint-Didier-sous-Aubenas (12)
75.	FC Clérieux-Saint-Bardoux-Granges-les-Beaumont (12)	1–4	AAJ Saint-Alban-d'Ay (11)
76.	FC Colombier Saint Barthélemy (12)	7–1	FC Rochepaule (13)
77.	US Meysse (13)	2–3	SC Bourguesan (11)
78.	Allex-Chabrillan-Eurre FC (11)	2–2 (4–2 p)	SC Romans (12)
79.	Diois FC (11)	1–5	CO Donzère (11)
80.	Olympique Saint-Montanais (12)	1–2	FC Rochegudien (12)
81.	RC Savasson (12)	2–2 (7–8 p)	US Baixoise (12)
82.	ES Saint-Jeure-d'Ay-Marsan (12)	0–2	IF Barbières-Bésayes-Rochefort-Samson-Marches (11)
83.	AS Génissieux (12)	0–0 (3–2 p)	US Montélier (11)
84.	US 2 Vallons (12)	3–5	CS Châteauneuf-de-Galaure (12)
85.	US Croix du Fraysse (11)	3–0	AS Désaignes (12)
86.	Co Châteauneuf-du-Rhône (12)	2–3	AS Roussas-Granges-Gontardes (11)
87.	ES Malissardoise (12)	6–1	JS Saint-Paul-lès-Romans (12)
88.	FC Montmiral-Parnans (12)	2–1	AS Vallée du Doux (11)
89.	SA Saint-Agrève (12)	2–4	AS Roiffieux (12)
90.	CS Lapeyrousien (12)	1–12	AS Cancoise (12)
91.	AS Saint-Marcelloise (12)	1–1 (5–3 p)	AS Saint-Priest 07 (12)
92.	JS Livron (12)	1–2	US Vallée du Jabron (11)
93.	US Saint Martin-de-Valamas (12)	2–1	FC Turquoise (12)
94.	ES Le Laris-Montchenu (12)	2–2 (3–1 p)	AS Saint-Barthélemy-Grozon (12)
95.	Vourey Sports (13)	2–2 (7–8 p)	MJC Saint-Hilaire-de-la-Côte (11)
96.	US Abbaye (13)	1–3	Beaucroissant FC (11)
97.	FC Quatre Montagnes (13)	2–1	US Village Olympique Grenoble (11)
98.	US Chatte (12)	1–7	US Beaurepairoise (11)
99.	FC Vallée de l'Hien (11)	0–0 (8–7 p)	US Saint-Geoire-en-Valdaine (12)
100.	US Cassolards Passageois (12)	1–2	CS Miribel (11)
101.	FC Virieu-Valondras (11)	3–0	AS Crossey (12)
102.	Claix Football (12)	1–2	Deux Rochers FC (11)
103.	ASF Portugais (11)	3–1	FC Vallée Bleue (12)
104.	Eyzin Saint-Sorlin FC (12)	2–3	Eclose Châteauvilain Badinières Football (11)
105.	US Saint-Paul-de-Varces (11)	2–2 (5–4 p)	FC Saint-Martin-d'Uriage (12)
106.	FC Chirens (12)	0–0 (4–2 p)	AS Saint-Joseph-de-Rivière (11)
107.	Balbins-Ornacieux-Semons Sports (11)	0–3	Moirans FC (12)
108.	AS Cessieu (12)	2–2 (4–2 p)	FC Tignieu-Jameyzieu (11)
109.	US Montgasconnaise (11)	5–3	FC Velanne (12)
110.	Le Grand-Lemps/Colombe/Apprieu Foot 38 (12)	0–6	AS Fontaine (12)
111.	JS Saint-Georgeoise (11)	3–3 (4–3 p)	FC Pont-de-Claix (12)
112.	ES Bizonnes-Belmont (12)	1–4	US Beauvoir-Royas (11)
113.	FOC Froges (12)	4–1	AC Poisat (11)
114.	FC Saint-Quentinois (11)	3–2	ASF Bourbre (12)
115.	US La Bâtie-Divisin (12)	5–1	ASCOL Foot 38 (11)
116.	AS Saint-Lattier (11)	8–1	FC Agnin (12)
117.	AS La Bridoire (12)	3–3 (6–5 p)	ES Bourget du Lac (11)
118.	Saint-Romain-les-Atheux Sports (13)	0–5	Saint-Étienne UC Terrenoire (11)
119.	AS Saint-Symphorien-de-Lay (11)	0–2	Nord Roannais (11)
120.	Le Rhins Sportif (13)	1–10	US Briennon (11)
121.	ABH FC (12)	5–1	Olympique Saint-Étienne (11)
122.	FC Régny (13)	0–4	US Bussières (11)
123.	FC Luriecq (12)	2–5	FC Bonson-Saint-Cyprien (12)
124.	Roanne Matel SFC (13)	1–1 (3–5 p)	US Filerin (11)
125.	AS Changy (12)	0–3	US Parigny Saint-Cyr (11)
126.	SS Ussonaise (11)	1–2	Haut Pilat Interfoot (11)
127.	Toranche FC (11)	1–3	Lignon FC (11)
128.	OC Grand Quartier (13)	0–0 (5–6 p)	AS Saint-Étienne Sud (13)
129.	CO Coutouvre (11)	2–1	AS Finerbal (11)
130.	OS Tarentaize-Beaubrun (13)	0–6	Feu Vert Saint-Chamond (11)
131.	Gand Olympique Avenir Loire Football	2–2 (5–6 p)	AS Noirétable (11)
132.	AS Cours (13)	4–1	ACL Mably (12)
133.	ES Dyonisienne (11)	2–1	FC Bords de Loire (11)
134.	FC Marcellinois (12)	3–1	AS Couzan (11)
135.	SC Piraillon (12)	1–2	OC Ondaine (11)
136.	FC Genilac (12)	1–2	CO La Rivière (11)
137.	AS Chausseterre-Les Salles (12)	2–1	FC Perreux (11)
138.	US Formans (12)	0–2	Sud Azergues Foot (10)
139.	AS Les Sauvages (12)	0–8	Beaujolais Football (10)
140.	FC Denicé Arnas (11)	1–2	ES Gleizé (11)
141.	AS Quatre Vents Trèves (13)	1–2	FC Ternay (12)
142.	Latino AFC Lyon (12)	1–0	FC Antillais Villeurbanne (13)
143.	AS Brignais (12)	1–6	FC Meys-Grézieu (9)
144.	US Villette-d'Anthon-Janneyrais (13)	0–5	AS Université Lyon (13)
145.	US Des Monts (11)	2–2 (5–4 p)	AS Grézieu-la-Varenne (12)
146.	AS Sornins Réunis (12)	2–4	Saint-Jean Sport (11)
147.	CS Vaulxois (11)	1–1 (2–4 p)	CS Ozon (11)
148.	Rhône Sud FC (11)	3–0	FC Franchevillois (11)
149.	AS Pusignan (11)	2–1	FC Saint-Fons (11)
150.	US Côteaux Lyonnais (11)	2–2 (5–6 p)	Lyon Croix Rousse Football (11)
151.	FC Bully (12)	5–2	AS Limas (11)
152.	ASC Générale Routière Maïa Sonnier (11)	3–3 (2–3 p)	US Vaulx-en-Velin (11)
153.	Chambost-Allières-Saint-Just-d'Avray (12)	0–4	FC Sourcieux-les-Mines (11)
154.	ES Frontonas-Chamagnieu (11)	1–3	ACS Mayotte du Rhône (11)
155.	Muroise Foot (11)	0–1	AS Buers Villeurbanne (11)
156.	US Montanay (11)	1–2	SC Maccabi Lyon (11)
157.	FC Franc Lyonnais (11)	1–7	RC Béligny (11)
158.	USF Tarare (11)	3–2	FC La Giraudière (11)
159.	AS Dardilly (11)	2–2 (3–5 p)	FC Reneins Vauxonne (11)
160.	Challes SF (12)	1–4	Cœur de Savoie (11)
161.	AS Brison-Saint-Innocent (11)	3–0	AJ Mayotte 73 (12)
162.	Entente Sonnaz-Viviers-Voglans (11)	1–3	US Domessin (11)
163.	AS Haute Combe de Savoie (12)	4–1	AS Mont Jovet Bozel (11)
164.	FC Saint-Baldoph (11)	0–0 (4–5 p)	FC La Rochette (11)
165.	FC Villargondran (11)	2–0	Marthod Sport (11)
166.	FC Aravis (13)	1–2	AS Parmelan Villaz (11)
167.	FC Villy-le-Pelloux (13)	1–7	AS Cornier (12)
168.	FC Les Houches-Servoz (13)	1–2	CS Megève (12)
169.	Arthaz Sports (13)	0–7	FC Evian (11)
170.	US Saint-Julien (12)	– (Note: Match abandoned with the scoreline 3–1. CA Bonnevillois 1921 penalised. US Saint-Julien qualify.)	CA Bonnevillois 1921 (11)
171.	US Challex (12)	2–4	AS Prévessin-Moëns (11)
172.	US Vétraz-Monthoux (12)	1–2	ES Douvaine-Loisin (11)
173.	US Pers-Jussy (12)	2–8	AS Thonon (11)
174.	ES Lanfonnet (12)	3–2	AS Portugais Annecy (12)
175.	CS Veigy-Foncenex (11)	1–1 (5–4 p)	FC Anthy Sport (12)
176.	AS Marin (12)	3–1	FC Arenthon-Scientrier (12)
177.	CSL Perrignier (12)	3–5	CS Saint-Pierre (11)
178.	AS Neydens (12)	4–1	US Margencel (11)
179.	FC Marigny-Saint-Marcel (12)	2–2 (7–6 p)	AS Lac Bleu (11)
180.	AS Épagny-Metz-Tessy (12)	0–4	Football Sud Gessien (11)
181.	CS Vacheresse Vallée d'Abondance (12)	0–4	FC Cluses (11)
182.	FC Gavot (12)	1–3	FC Cranves-Sales (11)
183.	ES Meythet (11)	4–2	ES Sciez (11)
184.	ES Viry (11)	5–0	FC Dingy-Saint-Clair (11)
185.	AS Le Lyaud-Armoy (11)	1–0	FC Frangy (11)

=== First round ===
These matches were played on 5 and 6 September 2020, with one postponed to 13 September.

First round results: Auvergne-Rhône-Alpes
Tie no	Home team (tier)	Score	Away team (tier)
1.	Ballon Beaulonnais (10)	0–6	US Vendat (8)
2.	FR Pouzy-Mésangy (11)	1–3	Bourbon Sportif (9)
3.	FC Souvigny (10)	4–0	AS Louchy (8)
4.	CS Vaux-Estivareilles (11)	0–1	Stade Saint-Yorre (9)
5.	AS Chassenard Luneau (11)	2–4	SC Avermes (8)
6.	ES Montagne Bourbonnaise (11)	0–1	AS Nord Vignoble (8)
7.	Espoir Molinetois (11)	2–3	AS Boucetoise (10)
8.	AS Lurcyquoise (10)	2–5	CS Bessay (9)
9.	Montluçon FC (11)	5–1	FC Hauterive (11)
10.	US Trezelles (10)	1–3	AS Gennetinoise (10)
11.	AS Sanssat (12)	0–8	AS Varennes-sur-Allier (8)
12.	AL Quinssaines (10)	4–0	Vigilante Garnat Saint-Martin (9)
13.	US Vallon (10)	1–1 (5–3 p)	SC Gannat (9)
14.	AS Val de Sioule (10)	1–1 (5–4 p)	Commentry FC (9)
15.	US Bien-Assis (11)	1–7	Bézenet-Doyet Foot (8)
16.	US Malicorne (11)	0–2	AS Dompierroise (9)
17.	ES Vernetoise (9)	0–0 (4–2 p)	AC Creuzier-le-Vieux (8)
18.	CS Chantelle (12)	0–1	FC Billy-Crechy (10)
19.	US Varennes-sur-Tèche (10)	3–1	Étoile Moulins Yzeure (9)
20.	Montagne Bourbonnaise FC (11)	0–2	US Lignerolles-Lavault Sainte-Anne (8)
21.	AS Tronget (10)	0–3	CS Cosne d'Allier (9)
22.	AS Neuilly-le-Réal (11)	0–0 (2–4 p)	US Chevagnes (11)
23.	AS Cérilly (11)	0–4	US Marcillat-Pionsat (10)
24.	US Abrest (11)	2–1	JS Neuvy (9)
25.	US Toque Huriel (11)	3–3 (5–6 p)	Médiéval Club Montluçonnais (9)
26.	AS Salignoise (11)	0–3	US Biachette Désertines (10)
27.	US Chaussenac (11)	1–7	AS Espinat (9)
28.	US Crandelles (9)	2–1	Sud Cantal Foot (8)
29.	US Cère et Landes (11)	1–1 (4–5 p)	AS Yolet (9)
30.	ES Roannaise (12)	0–3	CS Vézac (9)
31.	AS Pleaux-Rilhac-Barriac (10)	0–4	AS Sansacoise (8)
32.	US Haut Célé (11)	1–1 (3–4 p)	Carladez-Goul Sportif (9)
33.	FC Minier (10)	0–4	ES Pierrefortaise (8)
34.	ES Margeride (11)	3–2	ES Riomois-Condat (9)
35.	US La Chapelle-Laurent (10)	2–1	FC Artense (9)
36.	ES Vebret-Ydes (11)	2–2 (5–6 p)	Parlan-Le Rouget FC (8)
37.	Saignes FC (10)	0–5	FC des Quatre Vallées (9)
38.	FC Junhac-Montsalvy (10)	2–5	AS Belbexoise (9)
39.	US Besse (11)	0–1	ES Saint-Mamet (9)
40.	Saint-Georges SL (11)	0–2	US Murat (8)
41.	FC Massiac-Molompize-Blesle (10)	0–2	CS Arpajonnais (8)
42.	FC Saint-Germain-Laprade (10)	1–1 (2–3 p)	US Vals Le Puy (9)
43.	AA Saint-Front (13)	1–6	FC Tence (10)
44.	AS Beauzac (11)	1–2	AS Grazac-Lapte (9)
45.	US Arsac-en-Velay (9)	1–3	FC Dunières (8)
46.	US Montfaucon Montregard Raucoules (10)	0–1	AS Saint-Didier-Saint-Just (8)
47.	US Landos (9)	2–2 (5–6 p)	Sauveteurs Brivois (8)
48.	Vigilante Saint-Pal-de-Mons (10)	8–0	AS Saint-Pierre-Eynac (10)
49.	FC Arzon (10)	0–2	AS Loudes (8)
50.	AS Laussonne (9)	0–2	AS Chadrac (8)
51.	AS Saugues (11)	1–0	AS Cheminots Langeac (9)
52.	AS Pertuis (11)	4–3	AS Saint-Vidal (10)
53.	AS Villettoise (9)	1–3	Olympic Saint-Julien-Chapteuil (8)
54.	AS Mazet-Chambon (11)	1–3	US Bassoise (10)
55.	GS Dervaux Chambon-Feugerolles (9)	0–1	Seauve Sports (8)
56.	AS Ally-Mercoeur (11)	1–2	CO Coubon (10)
57.	AC Auzon-Azérat (10)	2–6	Solignac-Cussac FC (9)
58.	US Bains-Saint-Christophe (9)	3–1	US Fontannoise (8)
59.	AS Orcines (9)	5–1	Ecureuils Franc Rosier (9)
60.	Clermont Métropole FC (9)	4–2	FC Martres-Lussat (9)
61.	AL Glaine-Montaigut (10)	1–5	SC Billom (9)
62.	US Courpière (9)	2–2 (4–5 p)	AS Cellule (9) (Note: AS Cellule replaced ES Saint-Rémy-sur-Durolle in the original draw.)
63.	US Limons (10)	0–3	US Saint-Beauzire (8)
64.	AS Saint-Germain-Le Vernet (11)	0–4	US Bassin Minier (9)
65.	CS Saint-Anthème (12)	2–2 (4–5 p)	AI Saint-Babel (9)
66.	ES Couze Pavin (11)	1–1 (3–2 p)	ALS Besse Egliseneuve (9)
67.	CS Pont-de-Dore (10)	5–2	Durolle Foot (10)
68.	AS Royat (10)	2–4	Dômes-Sancy Foot (8)
69.	US Menat-Neuf-Eglise (11)	1–0	US Saint-Georges / Les Ancizes (8)
70.	US Saint-Gervaisienne (10)	2–2 (4–3 p)	FC Nord Combraille (10)
71.	US Messeix Bourg-Lastic (11)	0–2	AS Haute-Dordogne (10)
72.	FC Thiers Auvergne (11)	1–1 (4–3 p)	AS Livradois Sud (9)
73.	US Combronde (12)	0–6	JS Saint-Priest-des-Champs (9)
74.	Saint-Amant et Tallende SC (12)	1–0	ES Saint-Germinoise (8)
75.	RS Luzillat-Charnat-Vinzelles (10)	1–4	FC Nord Limagne (9)
76.	US Ménétrol (12)	1–3	US Maringues (8)
77.	FC Mirefleurs (10)	1–1 (3–4 p)	AS Job (9)
78.	RAS Beauregard l'Évêque (10)	1–3	FC Lezoux (9)
79.	ACS Cappadoce (11)	1–1 (2–4 p)	RC Charbonnières-Paugnat (10)
80.	FC Plauzat-Champeix (10)	0–1	EFC Saint-Amant-Tallende (8)
81.	AS Moissat (10)	1–0	CO Veyre-Monton (10)
82.	US Beauregard-Vendon (12)	2–2 (5–6 p)	CS Saint-Bonnet-près-Riom (10)
83.	AS Roche-Blanche FC (11)	2–3	FC Blanzat (9)
84.	Entente Charblot (11)	1–3	US Ennezat (9)
85.	FC Bromont-Lamothe/Montfermy (11)	0–1	FC Vertaizon (8)
86.	ES Volcans Malauzat (11)	1–5	AS Saint-Genès-Champanelle (8)
87.	Clermont Ouvoimoja (10)	1–2	Espérance Ceyratois Football (8)
88.	US Val de Couze Chambon (10)	1–3	Portugal FC Clermont Aubière (10)
89.	FC Aubierois (9)	1–3	AS Enval-Marsat (8)
90.	AS Romagnat (9)	3–1	UJ Clermontoise (8)
91.	AS Bibliothèque Portugaise (10)	0–5	US Les Martres-de-Veyre (8)
92.	AC Franco-Algérienne (10)	0–2	US Mozac (8)
93.	Clermont Outre-Mer (10)	3–4	US Vic-le-Comte (8)
94.	FC Mas-Rillier (12)	1–2	FC Saint-Maurice-de-Gourdans (11)
95.	JS Bresse Dombes (12)	3–1	Saint-Denis-Ambutrix FC (10)
96.	Côtière Meximieux Villieu (12)	1–1 (4–2 p)	FC Côtière-Luenaz (10)
97.	FC Serrières-Villebois (11)	1–6	Olympique Sud Revermont 01 (10)
98.	CO Plateau (12)	2–4	US Culoz Grand Colombier (10)
99.	US Dombes-Chalamont (11)	6–3	FC Saint-Vulbas Plaine de l'Ain (10)
100.	AS Chaveyriat-Chanoz (11)	0–4	US Replonges (10)
101.	AS Guéreins-Genouilleux (11)	0–3	FC Dombes-Bresse (9)
102.	US Veyziat (11)	0–8	AS Montréal-la-Cluse (9)
103.	FC Nurieux-Volognat (12)	4–2	ES Ambronay-Saint-Jean-le-Vieux (10)
104.	CS Chevroux (11)	1–4	FC Plaine Tonique (9)
105.	Entente Bas Bugey Rhône (11)	1–1 (4–5 p)	CS Belley (9)
106.	FC Bord de Veyle (11)	1–5	AS Saint-Laurentin (10)
107.	Valserine FC (11)	2–2 (2–4 p)	Concordia FC Bellegarde (10)
108.	SC Mille Étangs (12)	1–3	SC Portes de l'Ain (9)
109.	AS Travailleurs Turcs Oyonnax (11)	1–2	AS Attignat (10)
110.	ES Revermontoise (10)	0–1	Bourg Sud (9)
111.	Jassans-Frans Foot (9)	2–0	Fareins Saône Vallée Foot (10)
112.	ES Val de Saône (10)	1–2	Bresse Foot 01 (10)
113.	US Izernore (10)	0–12	Oyonnax Plastics Vallée FC (8)
114.	Ambérieu FC (9)	0–3	FC Bressans (8)
115.	FO Bourg-en-Bresse (9)	1–3	FC Veyle Sâone (8)
116.	FC Bords de l'Ain (9)	0–2	US Arbent Marchon (8)
117.	FC Curtafond-Confrançon-Saint-Martin-Saint-Didier (10)	1–5	CS Lagnieu (8)
118.	FC Bresse Nord (10)	1–4	ES Foissiat-Étrez (8)
119.	FC Sermoyer (13)	0–3	AS Bâgé-le-Châtel (10)
120.	FC Dombes (10)	1–2	CS Viriat (8)
121.	FC Cormoz Saint-Nizier (13)	0–8	FC Manziat (10)
122.	FC Félines-Saint-Cyr-Peaugres (11)	0–5	US Davézieux-Vidalon (10)
123.	FC Saint-Restitut (13)	2–5	US Bas-Vivarais (11)
124.	US Drôme Provence (12)	1–0	FC 540 (11)
125.	AS Homenetmen Bourg-lès Valence (11)	4–1	AS Véore Montoison (10)
126.	FC Rambertois (11)	3–3 (2–4 p)	US Pont-La Roche (11)
127.	FC Bren (12)	5–1	FC Goubetois (12)
128.	US Lussas (12)	2–1	US Rochemaure (11)
129.	AS Vanséenne (13)	1–0	AS Coucouron (11)
130.	AAJ Saint-Alban-d'Ay (11)	2–6	FR Allan (10)
131.	FC Colombier Saint Barthélemy (12)	4–1	US Peyrins (12)
132.	SC Bourguesan (11)	4–0	US Saint-Gervais-sur-Roubion (11)
133.	FC Cheylarois (11)	1–0	Allex-Chabrillan-Eurre FC (11)
134.	CO Donzère (11)	3–1	US Saint-Just-Saint-Marcel (11)
135.	FC Rochegudien (12)	1–1 (4–2 p)	FC Vallon-Pont d'Arc (12)
136.	US Baixoise (12)	2–1	AS Berg-Helvie (10)
137.	IF Barbières-Bésayes-Rochefort-Samson-Marches (11)	0–0 (9–8 p)	FC Muzolais (10)
138.	AS Génissieux (12)	0–1	RC Tournon-Tain (11)
139.	CS Châteauneuf-de-Galaure (12)	2–6	CO Châteauneuvois (9)
140.	US Croix du Fraysse (11)	0–1	FC Larnage-Serves (11)
141.	AS Roussas-Granges-Gontardes (11)	0–3	US Vals-les-Bains (11)
142.	ES Malissardoise (12)	3–3 (5–4 p)	FC Hermitage (11)
143.	FC Montmiral-Parnans (12)	0–0 (4–1 p)	AS Portugaise Valence (10)
144.	AS Roiffieux (12)	1–3	PS Romanaise (9)
145.	AS Cancoise (12)	1–4	Entente Sarras Sports Saint-Vallier (10)
146.	AS Saint-Marcelloise (12)	0–7	FC Péageois (9)
147.	US Vallée du Jabron (11)	2–3	FC Portois (9)
148.	US Saint Martin-de-Valamas (12)	2–7	RC Mauves (10)
149.	ES Le Laris-Montchenu (12)	2–3	Vallis Auréa Foot (11)
150.	AS Cornas (10)	0–2	AS Donatienne (8)
151.	US Chanas Sablons Serrières (9)	1–1 (4–5 p)	AS Valensolles (10)
152.	FC Hauterives/US Grand-Serre (11)	1–2	FC Bourg-lès-Valence (9)
153.	Espérance Hostunoise (10)	2–6	Valence FC (9)
154.	FC Châtelet (10)	0–5	US Mours (9)
155.	US Val d'Ay (10)	0–0 (4–2 p)	FC Annonay (8)
156.	US Ancône (11)	0–2	US Portes Hautes Cévennes (9)
157.	ES Boulieu-lès-Annonay (10)	2–3	Rhône Crussol Foot 07 (8)
158.	US Montmeyran (10)	0–0 (4–3 p)	ASF Pierrelatte (8)
159.	Olympique Centre Ardèche (9)	1–1 (5–6 p)	FC Montélimar (10)
160.	FC Tricastin (10)	0–4	SC Cruas (8)
161.	AS Saint-Barthélemy-de-Vals (10)	0–4	FC Eyrieux Embroye (8)
162.	FC Aubenas (11)	0–3	Olympique Ruomsois (8)
163.	Inter Haute Herbasse (12)	2–6	US Beaurepairoise (11)
164.	OS Vallée de l'Ouvèze (12)	1–3	ES Beaumonteleger (11)
165.	ES Nord Drôme (11)	1–1 (3–1 p)	ES Chomérac (10)
166.	AS La Sanne (11)	0–2	Football Mont-Pilat (9)
167.	AS Dolon (11)	2–0	EA Montvendre (11)
168.	AS Cheyssieu (12)	1–14	AL Saint-Maurice-l'Exil (9)
169.	MJC Saint-Hilaire-de-la-Côte (11)	2–2 (4–2 p)	EF des Étangs (11)
170.	Beaucroissant FC (11)	1–2	US La Murette (9)
171.	FC Quatre Montagnes (13)	0–5	Saint-Martin-d'Hères FC (9)
172.	FC Vallée de l'Hien (11)	1–1 (8–7 p)	Isle d'Abeau FC (10)
173.	CS Miribel (11)	2–2 (4–3 p)	FC Bilieu (10)
174.	FC Virieu-Valondras (11)	0–1	AS Tullins-Fures (10)
175.	Deux Rochers FC (11)	3–1	UO Portugal Saint-Martin-d'Hères (10)
176.	ASF Portugais (11)	0–1	CVL38 FC (10)
177.	Eclose Châteauvilain Badinières Football (11)	1–5	US Reventin (9)
178.	US Saint-Paul-de-Varces (11)	1–1 (2–5 p)	AS Italienne Européenne Grenoble (9)
179.	FC Chirens (12)	0–5	FC Allobroges Asafia (9)
180.	Moirans FC (12)	1–1 (3–4 p)	Olympique Les Avenières (10)
181.	AS Cessieu (12)	2–6	US Corbelin (10)
182.	US Montgasconnaise (11)	2–1	Olympique Villefontaine (10)
183.	AS Fontaine (12)	1–0	US Sassenage (9)
184.	JS Saint-Georgeoise (11)	1–1 (3–4 p)	Amicale Tunisienne Saint-Martin-d'Hères (10)
185.	US Beauvoir-Royas (11)	1–3	Formafoot Bièvre Valloire (9)
186.	FOC Froges (12)	2–2 (5–4 p)	Noyarey FC (10)
187.	FC Saint-Quentinois (11)	1–1 (4–3 p)	ASJF Domène (10)
188.	US La Bâtie-Divisin (12)	0–2	AS Saint-André-le-Gaz (9)
189.	AS Saint-Lattier (11)	1–1 (2–4 p)	US Ro-Claix (10)
190.	CS Faramans (10)	3–0 (Note: Tie won by means of forfeit.)	FC des Collines (10)
191.	AS Pontcharra (10)	2–3	FC Seyssins (8)
192.	FC Liers (11)	1–1 (2–4 p)	US Dolomoise (10)
193.	FC Versoud (9)	1–2	FC Vallée de la Gresse (8)
194.	AS Vézeronce-Huert (9)	2–2 (4–3 p)	ASL Saint-Cassien (9)
195.	FC Sud Isère (10)	3–5	OC Eybens (8)
196.	US Creys-Morestel (10)	0–0 (2–4 p)	CS Verpillière (8)
197.	Stade Chabonnais (10)	1–5	FC Charvieu-Chavagneux (8)
198.	Rives SF (10)	1–2	ES Rachais (8)
199.	FC Lauzes (10)	2–5	Olympique Nord Dauphiné (8)
200.	CF Estrablin (9)	0–5	FC Varèze (8)
201.	CS Nivolas-Vermelle (9)	1–1 (4–3 p)	FC Voiron-Moirans (8)
202.	FC Balmes Nord-Isère (9)	1–1 (4–5 p)	AS Ver Sau (8)
203.	CS Voreppe (10)	1–2	US Jarrie-Champ (9)
204.	FC La Sure (10)	1–2	FC Crolles-Bernin (9)
205.	Union Nord Iséroise (10)	0–3	AS Domarin (8)
206.	Saint-Étienne UC Terrenoire (11)	2–2 (4–2 p)	FC Bourguisan (10)
207.	Nord Roannais (11)	5–0	Rhins Trambouze Foot (11)
208.	US Briennon (11)	2–1	AS Saint-Hanoise (11)
209.	ABH FC (12)	0–2	ES Doizieux-La Terrasse-sur-Dorlay (11)
210.	US Bussières (11)	2–2 (11–12 p)	Olympique Est Roannais (11)
211.	FC Bonson-Saint-Cyprien (12)	4–0	FC Saint-Martin-La-Sauveté (12)
212.	US Filerin (11)	2–1	ASL Portugais Roanne (10)
213.	US Parigny Saint-Cyr (11)	1–0	AS Pouilly-les-Nonains (10)
214.	Haut Pilat Interfoot (11)	1–4	AS Saint-Just-Saint-Rambert (10)
215.	Lignon FC (11)	2–4	US Ecotay-Moingt (10)
216.	AS Saint-Étienne Sud (13)	0–0 (3–4 p)	FC Montrambert Ricamar (10)
217.	CO Coutouvre (11)	1–3	US Villerest (10)
218.	Feu Vert Saint-Chamond (11)	2–2 (5–6 p)	AF Pays de Coise (9)
219.	AS Noirétable (11)	0–1	US Renaisonnaise Apchonnaise (10)
220.	AS Cours (13)	0–11	Riorges FC (10)
221.	ES Dyonisienne (11)	1–1 (13–12 p)	FC Loire Sornin (10)
222.	FC Marcellinois (12)	1–7	FCI Saint-Romain-le-Puy (10)
223.	OC Ondaine (11)	0–4	US L'Horme (10)
224.	CO La Rivière (11)	3–6	JS Cellieu (10)
225.	AS Chausseterre-Les Salles (12)	0–2	Olympique Le Coteau (10)
226.	Sury SC (10)	0–2	AS Savigneux-Montbrison (8)
227.	CS Crémeaux (10)	1–5	SEL Saint-Priest-en-Jarez (8)
228.	AS Aveizieux (10)	0–6	FC Saint-Étienne (8)
229.	FC Saint-Joseph-Saint-Martin (10)	3–3 (2–4 p)	Anzieux Foot (13) (Note: Anzieux Foot replaced FC Chazelles in the original draw.)
230.	FC Boisset-Chalain (10)	1–1 (4–5 p)	Sorbiers-La Talaudière (8)
231.	FC Montagnes du Matin (13)	1–1 (4–3 p)	AS Chambéon-Magneux (9)
232.	US Sud Forézienne (10)	2–0	USG La Fouillouse (8)
233.	ES Champdieu-Marcilly (10)	2–2 (3–4 p)	ES Saint-Christo-Marcenod (10)
234.	Forez Donzy FC (9)	1–2	Roanne AS Parc du Sport (8)
235.	AS Châteauneuf (9)	1–3	L'Étrat-La Tour Sportif (8)
236.	Olympique du Montcel (9)	0–3	US Villars (8)
237.	AS Algérienne Chambon-Feugerolles (9)	1–2	AC Rive-de-Gier (8)
238.	FC Saint-Paul-en-Jarez (9)	3–0	US Saint-Galmier-Chambœuf (8)
239.	Sud Azergues Foot (10)	1–1 (4–2 p)	AS Saint-Forgeux (10)
240.	Beaujolais Football (10)	1–1 (5–4 p)	FC Mont Brouilly (9)
241.	ES Gleizé (11)	3–3 (5–4 p)	Chazay FC (10)
242.	FC Ternay (12)	2–3	Artas Charantonnay FC (10)
243.	Latino AFC Lyon (12)	0–2	FC Fontaines-sur-Saône (10)
244.	FC Meys-Grézieu (9)	6–1	ES Charly Foot (10)
245.	AS Université Lyon (13)	2–2 (4–2 p)	AS Diémoz (10)
246.	US Des Monts (11)	0–8	ES Chaponost (9)
247.	Saint-Jean Sport (11)	0–7	FC Lamure Poule (10)
248.	CS Ozon (11)	3–4	AS Rhodanienne (10)
249.	Rhône Sud FC (11)	1–1 (4–3 p)	CAS Cheminots Oullins Lyon (10)
250.	AS Pusignan (11)	1–7	UGA Lyon-Décines (9)
251.	Lyon Croix Rousse Football (11)	1–1 (3–5 p)	Olympique Vaulx-en-Venlin (10)
252.	FC Bully (12)	0–3	FC Saint-Romain-de-Popey (10)
253.	US Vaulx-en-Velin (11)	2–0	FC Sainte-Foy-lès-Lyon (10)
254.	FC Sourcieux-les-Mines (11)	0–2	Savigny FC (10)
255.	ACS Mayotte du Rhône (11)	1–3	AS Manissieux (10)
256.	AS Buers Villeurbanne (11)	2–0	ES Saint-Priest (10)
257.	SC Maccabi Lyon (11)	0–1	FC Croix Roussien (10)
258.	RC Béligny (11)	1–1 (4–5 p)	FC Pays de l'Arbresle (9)
259.	USF Tarare (11)	2–1	Éveil de Lyon (10)
260.	FC Reneins Vauxonne (11)	1–1 (4–3 p)	FC Point du Jour (10)
261.	USC Lyon Vaise (10)	2–5	AS Algerienne Villeurbanne (8)
262.	US Loire-Saint-Romain (10)	2–2 (4–3 p)	AS Villefontaine (8)
263.	AS Bron Grand Lyon (8)	8–1 (Note: Tie reversed from original draw.)	USM Pierre-Bénite (10)
264.	JSO Givors (10)	2–1	Feyzin Club Belle Étoile (8)
265.	Ménival FC (9)	2–1	US Millery-Vourles (8)
266.	CO Saint-Fons (9)	1–2	FC Val Lyonnais (8)
267.	CS Meginand (9)	2–0	FC Chaponnay-Marennes (8)
268.	ASM Saint-Pierre-la-Palud (10)	2–4	UF Belleville Saint-Jean-d'Ardières (8)
269.	FC Sud Ouest 69 (10)	4–3	AL Mions (8)
270.	Saint-Alban Sportif (10)	1–3	SO Pont-de-Chéruy-Chavanoz (8)
271.	US Est Lyonnais (9)	4–1	FC Pontcharra-Saint-Loup (8)
272.	Lyon Ouest SC (9)	1–5	Stade Amplepuisien (8)
273.	FC Corbas (9)	2–2 (1–3 p)	Olympique Belleroche Villefranche (8)
274.	FC Grigny (9)	0–4	AS Craponne (8)
275.	AS Portugaise Vaulx-en-Velin (10)	0–6	AS Bellecour-Perrache (8)
276.	FC Gerland Lyon (10)	0–2	US Meyzieu (8)
277.	FC Colombier-Satolas (9)	4–2	Caluire SC (8)
278.	Association Chandieu-Heyrieux (9)	2–1	AS Villeurbanne Éveil Lyonnais (9)
279.	FC Rive Droite (10)	0–0 (2–3 p)	FC Saint-Cyr Collonges au Mont d'Or (8)
280.	AS Saint-Martin-en-Haut (9)	0–1	Olympique Rillieux (9)
281.	AS La Bridoire (12)	2–2 (4–1 p)	AS Novalaise (10)
282.	Cœur de Savoie (11)	0–2	Chambéry Sport 73 (10)
283.	AS Brison-Saint-Innocent (11)	0–3	US Chartreuse Guiers (9)
284.	US Domessin (11)	1–3	USC Aiguebelle (10)
285.	AS Haute Combe de Savoie (12)	2–2 (4–5 p)	FC Saint-Michel Sports (11)
286.	FC La Rochette (11)	0–7	FC Haute Tarentaise (8)
287.	FC Villargondran (11)	0–3	CA Maurienne (8)
288.	UO Albertville (9)	1–0	FC Chambotte (8)
289.	US Pontoise (9)	0–4	FC Belle Étoile Mercury (9)
290.	US Motteraine (9)	0–1	ES Drumettaz-Mouxy (8)
291.	US Grand Mont La Bâthie (10)	0–9	JS Chambéry (8)
292.	Montmélian AF (9)	0–0 (3–4 p)	Entente Val d'Hyères (8)
293.	AS Cuines-La Chambre Val d'Arc (10)	0–2	Nivolet FC (8)
294.	FC Laissaud (10)	3–0	Cognin Sports (8)
295.	US Modane (10)	1–6	AS Ugine (9)
296.	Saint-Pierre SF (10)	3–5	US Grignon (9)
297.	AS Parmelan Villaz (11)	0–5	FC Thônes (9)
298.	AS Cornier (12)	2–3	ES Saint-Jeoire-La Tour (10)
299.	CS Megève (12)	3–0	CS Chamonix (12)
300.	FC Evian (11)	2–3	AG Bons-en-Chablais (10)
301.	US Saint-Julien (12)	2–2 (3–4 p)	SC Morzine Vallée d'Aulps (10)
302.	AS Prévessin-Moëns (11)	1–2	FC Marcellaz-Albanais (11)
303.	ES Douvaine-Loisin (11)	3–0	ES Valleiry (10)
304.	AS Thonon (11)	4–0	AS Évires (11)
305.	ES Lanfonnet (12)	1–4	CSA Poisy (10)
306.	CS Veigy-Foncenex (11)	0–4	JS Reignier (9)
307.	AS Marin (12)	3–5	FC Ballaison (9)
308.	CS Saint-Pierre (11)	2–4	ASC Sallanches (10)
309.	AS Neydens (12)	1–12	SS Allinges (9)
310.	FC Marigny-Saint-Marcel (12)	0–4	AJ Ville-la-Grand (10)
311.	Football Sud Gessien (11)	1–3	CS La Balme-de-Sillingy (10)
312.	FC Cluses (11)	2–2 (4–5 p)	Haut Giffre FC (9)
313.	FC Cranves-Sales (11)	3–5	FRS Champanges (11)
314.	ES Meythet (11)	0–0 (8–9 p)	FC Chéran (9)
315.	ES Viry (11)	1–3	FC La Filière (10)
316.	AS Le Lyaud-Armoy (11)	4–0	Olympique Cran (10)
317.	FC Cessy-Gex (11)	1–3	Marignier Sports (9)
318.	Beaumont Collonges FC (10)	1–3	ES Amancy (8)
319.	ES Fillinges (10)	2–1	AS Sillingy (9)
320.	Échenevex-Ségny-Chevry Olympique (10)	2–3	AS Saint-Genis-Ferney-Crozet (8)
321.	CS Ayze (10)	0–2	US Mont Blanc (8)
322.	ES Seynod (9)	3–0	FC Cruseilles (8)
323.	FJ Ambilly (10)	0–2	US Semnoz-Vieugy (8)
324.	FC Semine (11)	2–1	US Argonay (10)
325.	FC Combloux (10)	1–6	US Annemasse-Gaillard (8)
326.	US La Ravoire (9)	1–2	Vallée du Giers FC (8)
327.	ES Thyez (10)	0–1	US Pringy (8)
328.	FC Vuache (10)	1–6	US Divonne (8)
329.	ES Cernex (10)	1–5	FC Foron (8)
330.	CO Chavanod (10)	0–0 (3–5 p)	CS Amphion Publier (8)

=== Second round ===
These matches were played on 12 and 13 September 2020, with two postponed to 16 and 20 September 2020.

Second round results: Auvergne-Rhône-Alpes
Tie no	Home team (tier)	Score	Away team (tier)
1.	AS Gennetinoise (10)	2–1	SC Avermes (8)
2.	FC Billy-Crechy (10)	1–2	SC Saint-Pourcain (7)
3.	FC Souvigny (10)	3–1	SCA Cussét (7)
4.	CS Cosne d'Allier (9)	1–3	Bourbon Sportif (9)
5.	Montluçon FC (11)	2–0	US Abrest (11)
6.	US Biachette Désertines (10)	1–2	AS Varennes-sur-Allier (8)
7.	AS Val de Sioule (10)	2–5	Bézenet-Doyet Foot (8)
8.	US Vallon (10)	3–1	US Vendat (8)
9.	US Varennes-sur-Tèche (10)	0–6	AA Lapalisse (7)
10.	AL Quinssaines (10)	1–4	AS Cheminots Saint-Germain (7)
11.	US Lignerolles-Lavault Sainte-Anne (8)	1–0	Stade Saint-Yorre (9)
12.	AS Dompierroise (9)	1–0	ES Vernetoise (9)
13.	US Marcillat-Pionsat (10)	1–2	AS Boucetoise (10)
14.	US Chevagnes (11)	0–2	AS Nord Vignoble (8)
15.	CS Bessay (9)	0–0 (5–3 p)	Médiéval Club Montluçonnais (9)
16.	CS Arpajonnais (8)	0–1	ES Pierrefortaise (8)
17.	ES Saint-Mamet (9)	2–3	FC Ally Mauriac (7)
18.	Carladez-Goul Sportif (9)	2–3	AS Belbexoise (9)
19.	CS Vézac (9)	1–1 (6–5 p)	Entente Nord Lozère (7)
20.	US Crandelles (9)	5–0	US La Chapelle-Laurent (10)
21.	FC des Quatre Vallées (9)	0–4	AS Sansacoise (8)
22.	Parlan-Le Rouget FC (8)	3–1	AS Espinat (9)
23.	US Murat (8)	3–1	US Vallée de l'Authre (7)
24.	ES Margeride (11)	0–2	AS Yolet (9)
25.	US Bains-Saint-Christophe (9)	2–2 (3–2 p)	AS Emblavez-Vorey (7)
26.	CO Coubon (10)	1–2	FC Dunières (8)
27.	AS Pertuis (11)	2–4	Association Vergongheon-Arvant (7)
28.	AS Saugues (11)	0–3	AS Grazac-Lapte (9)
29.	AS Loudes (8)	1–5	US Monistrol (8)
30.	AS Saint-Didier-Saint-Just (8)	1–2	Sauveteurs Brivois (8)
31.	US Vals Le Puy (9)	4–1	SC Langogne (7)
32.	US Bassoise (10)	0–4	Retournac Sportif (7)
33.	Solignac-Cussac FC (9)	6–0	FC Tence (10)
34.	Vigilante Saint-Pal-de-Mons (10)	0–1	US Sucs et Lignon (7)
35.	Seauve Sports (8)	1–2	US Brioude (7)
36.	AS Chadrac (8)	0–3 (Note: Tie won by means of forfeit.)	Olympic Saint-Julien-Chapteuil (8)
37.	AI Saint-Babel (9)	2–2 (1–4 p)	FCUS Ambert (7)
38.	CS Pont-de-Dore (10)	1–0	CS Pont-du-Château (7)
39.	US Parigny Saint-Cyr (11)	2–5	AS Cellule (9)
40.	ES Couze Pavin (11)	1–7	US Issoire (7)
41.	AS Saint-Genès-Champanelle (8)	1–3	US Beaumontoise (7)
42.	US Saint-Gervaisienne (10)	5–1	US Menat-Neuf-Eglise (11)
43.	JS Saint-Priest-des-Champs (9)	0–2	US Maringues (8)
44.	US Bassin Minier (9)	2–1	EFC Saint-Amant-Tallende (8)
45.	FC Thiers Auvergne (11)	0–2	US Vic-le-Comte (8)
46.	CS Saint-Bonnet-près-Riom (10)	0–2	US Saint-Beauzire (8)
47.	AS Haute-Dordogne (10)	1–2	Dômes-Sancy Foot (8)
48.	Clermont Métropole FC (9)	5–1	FC Vertaizon (8)
49.	AS Orcines (9)	1–3	US Mozac (8)
50.	SC Billom (9)	1–2	AS Romagnat (9)
51.	Saint-Amant et Tallende SC (12)	1–1 (2–4 p)	AS Job (9)
52.	FC Lezoux (9)	1–4	FC Cournon-d'Auvergne (7)
53.	RC Charbonnières-Paugnat (10)	0–3	FC Châtel-Guyon (7)
54.	FC Nord Limagne (9)	3–1	AS Enval-Marsat (8)
55.	AS Moissat (10)	1–0	Espérance Ceyratois Football (8)
56.	US Ennezat (9)	1–4	US Les Martres-de-Veyre (8)
57.	FC Blanzat (9)	1–2	Portugal FC Clermont Aubière (10)
58.	FC Saint-Maurice-de-Gourdans (11)	3–3 (2–3 p)	Côtière Meximieux Villieu (12)
59.	JS Bresse Dombes (12)	2–4	US Culoz Grand Colombier (10)
60.	Olympique Sud Revermont 01 (10)	2–2 (1–4 p)	US Replonges (10)
61.	US Dombes-Chalamont (11)	0–2	FC Dombes-Bresse (9)
62.	AS Montréal-la-Cluse (9)	1–3	FC Bords de Saône (7)
63.	FC Nurieux-Volognat (12)	1–6	ES Foissiat-Étrez (8)
64.	FC Plaine Tonique (9)	2–4	ES Bressane Marboz (7)
65.	CS Belley (9)	0–3	FC La Tour-Saint-Clair (7)
66.	AS Saint-Laurentin (10)	2–1	Bourg Sud (9)
67.	Concordia FC Bellegarde (10)	0–6	Oyonnax Plastics Vallée FC (8)
68.	AS Attignat (10)	1–3	FC Bressans (8)
69.	Jassans-Frans Foot (9)	0–3	US Feillens (7)
70.	Bresse Foot 01 (10)	1–2	FC Veyle Sâone (8)
71.	AS Bâgé-le-Châtel (10)	0–5	US Arbent Marchon (8)
72.	FC Manziat (10)	2–4	CS Lagnieu (8)
73.	SC Portes de l'Ain (9)	0–5	CS Viriat (8)
74.	US Davézieux-Vidalon (10)	1–2	MOS Trois Rivières (7)
75.	US Drôme Provence (12)	2–1	US Montmeyran (10)
76.	US Bas-Vivarais (11)	4–1	SC Bourguesan (11)
77.	AS Homenetmen Bourg-lès Valence (11)	1–7	AS Chavanay (7)
78.	US Pont-La Roche (11)	2–5	FR Allan (10)
79.	FC Bren (12)	1–1 (7–6 p)	FC Cheylarois (11)
80.	US Lussas (12)	1–5	CO Donzère (11)
81.	AS Vanséenne (13)	0–11	CO Châteauneuvois (9)
82.	FC Colombier Saint Barthélemy (12)	3–2	IF Barbières-Bésayes-Rochefort-Samson-Marches (11)
83.	FC Rochegudien (12)	2–1	US Vals-les-Bains (11)
84.	US Baixoise (12)	1–5	SC Cruas (8)
85.	RC Tournon-Tain (11)	5–2	FC Montmiral-Parnans (12)
86.	FC Larnage-Serves (11)	1–1 (5–4 p)	FC Portois (9)
87.	ES Malissardoise (12)	1–8	AS Donatienne (8)
88.	PS Romanaise (9)	1–1 (3–5 p)	Rhône Crussol Foot 07 (8)
89.	Entente Sarras Sports Saint-Vallier (10)	1–2	FC Péageois (9)
90.	RC Mauves (10)	2–2 (3–1 p)	US Val d'Ay (10)
91.	Vallis Auréa Foot (11)	1–3	FC Bourg-lès-Valence (9)
92.	US Portes Hautes Cévennes (9)	2–2 (3–4 p)	AS Sud Ardèche (7)
93.	AS Valensolles (10)	1–2	Olympique Ruomsois (8)
94.	Valence FC (9)	3–1	FC Valdaine (7)
95.	US Mours (9)	0–0 (2–4 p)	FC Eyrieux Embroye (8)
96.	FC Montélimar (10)	1–1 (4–2 p)	FC Chabeuil (7)
97.	AL Saint-Maurice-l'Exil (9)	4–6	Olympique Saint-Genis-Laval (7)
98.	ES Beaumonteleger (11)	2–1	Football Mont-Pilat (9)
99.	ES Nord Drôme (11)	0–3	UMS Montélimar (7)
100.	AS Dolon (11)	1–2	Entente Crest-Aouste (7)
101.	MJC Saint-Hilaire-de-la-Côte (11)	0–2	Saint-Martin-d'Hères FC (9)
102.	US La Murette (9)	1–1 (3–4 p)	Football Côte Saint-André (7)
103.	CS Miribel (11)	2–2 (5–4 p)	FC Vallée de l'Hien (11)
104.	AS Tullins-Fures (10)	0–3	FC Seyssins (8)
105.	Deux Rochers FC (11)	1–1 (3–0 p)	AS Fontaine (12)
106.	CVL38 FC (10)	1–3	FC Charvieu-Chavagneux (8)
107.	US Reventin (9)	2–3	ES Manival (7)
108.	AS Italienne Européenne Grenoble (9)	0–1	FC Vallée de la Gresse (8)
109.	FC Allobroges Asafia (9)	1–0	AS Ver Sau (8)
110.	Olympique Les Avenières (10)	0–0 (2–4 p)	AS Saint-André-le-Gaz (9)
111.	US Corbelin (10)	1–0	Olympique Nord Dauphiné (8)
112.	US Montgasconnaise (11)	1–1 (4–3 p)	AS Vézeronce-Huert (9)
113.	Amicale Tunisienne Saint-Martin-d'Hères (10)	1–6	ES Rachais (8)
114.	Formafoot Bièvre Valloire (9)	2–3	OC Eybens (8)
115.	FOC Froges (12)	1–3	CS Nivolas-Vermelle (9)
116.	FC Saint-Quentinois (11)	0–5	AS Domarin (8)
117.	US Ro-Claix (10)	0–10	FC Varèze (8)
118.	CS Faramans (10)	0–2	CS Verpillière (8)
119.	US Dolomoise (10)	0–0 (1–3 p)	FC Crolles-Bernin (9)
120.	US Jarrie-Champ (9)	0–3	US Gières (7)
121.	Saint-Étienne UC Terrenoire (11)	2–6	Saint-Chamond Foot (7)
122.	Nord Roannais (11)	1–0	US Est Lyonnais (9)
123.	US Briennon (11)	4–3	US Villerest (10)
124.	ES Doizieux-La Terrasse-sur-Dorlay (11)	2–2 (8–7 p)	FC Montrambert Ricamar (10)
125.	Olympique Est Roannais (11)	1–1 (4–5 p)	Olympique Le Coteau (10)
126.	FC Bonson-Saint-Cyprien (12)	1–3	AS Saint-Just-Saint-Rambert (10)
127.	US Filerin (11)	0–4	FC Saint-Paul-en-Jarez (9)
128.	US Ecotay-Moingt (10)	2–0	US Sud Forézienne (10)
129.	US Renaisonnaise Apchonnaise (10)	1–1 (5–4 p)	AS Savigneux-Montbrison (8)
130.	ES Dyonisienne (11)	0–2	Sorbiers-La Talaudière (8)
131.	FCI Saint-Romain-le-Puy (10)	4–6	FC Saint-Étienne (8)
132.	US L'Horme (10)	3–2 (Note: Tie reversed from original draw.)	Anzieux Foot (13)
133.	JS Cellieu (10)	6–4	FC Montagnes du Matin (13)
134.	ES Saint-Christo-Marcenod (10)	2–2 (3–4 p)	SEL Saint-Priest-en-Jarez (8)
135.	AF Pays de Coise (9)	2–3	L'Étrat-La Tour Sportif (8)
136.	Sud Azergues Foot (10)	2–3	Roanne AS Parc du Sport (8)
137.	US Villars (8)	3–0	FC Meys-Grézieu (9)
138.	ES Chaponost (9)	3–5	AC Rive-de-Gier (8)
139.	Beaujolais Football (10)	1–7	CS Neuville (7)
140.	ES Gleizé (11)	0–4	Roannais Foot 42 (7)
141.	Artas Charantonnay FC (10)	1–5	Olympique Saint-Marcellin (7)
142.	FC Fontaines-sur-Saône (10)	1–1 (5–4 p)	AS Algerienne Villeurbanne (8)
143.	AS Université Lyon (13)	3–9	Ménival FC (9)
144.	FC Lamure Poule (10)	2–4	AS Bron Grand Lyon (8)
145.	AS Rhodanienne (10)	1–9	Côte Chaude Sportif (7)
146.	Rhône Sud FC (11)	0–6	FC Roche-Saint-Genest (7)
147.	UGA Lyon-Décines (9)	0–1	ES Veauche (7)
148.	Olympique Vaulx-en-Venlin (10)	6–2	US Loire-Saint-Romain (10)
149.	FC Saint-Romain-de-Popey (10)	4–1	JSO Givors (10)
150.	US Vaulx-en-Velin (11)	1–7	Sud Lyonnais Foot (7)
151.	Savigny FC (10)	2–5	FC Colombier-Satolas (9)
152.	AS Manissieux (10)	1–2	CS Meginand (9)
153.	AS Buers Villeurbanne (11)	1–0	SO Pont-de-Chéruy-Chavanoz (8)
154.	FC Croix Roussien (10)	0–8	Stade Amplepuisien (8)
155.	FC Pays de l'Arbresle (9)	0–1	Domtac FC (7)
156.	USF Tarare (11)	1–1 (4–5 p)	FC Sud Ouest 69 (10)
157.	FC Reneins Vauxonne (11)	3–0	UF Belleville Saint-Jean-d'Ardières (8)
158.	Olympique Rillieux (9)	1–1 (10–9 p)	Olympique Belleroche Villefranche (8)
159.	Association Chandieu-Heyrieux (9)	2–5	FC Val Lyonnais (8)
160.	US Chartreuse Guiers (9)	2–2 (5–6 p)	AS Montchat Lyon (7)
161.	Riorges FC (10)	1–3	AS Craponne (8)
162.	AS La Bridoire (12)	0–4	FC Saint-Cyr Collonges au Mont d'Or (8)
163.	US Beaurepairoise (11)	1–0	AS Bellecour-Perrache (8)
164.	Chambéry Sport 73 (10)	2–7	US Meyzieu (8)
165.	USC Aiguebelle (10)	1–1 (4–3 p)	CA Maurienne (8)
166.	FC Saint-Michel Sports (11)	1–0	Entente Val d'Hyères (8)
167.	FC Belle Étoile Mercury (9)	1–0	FC Haute Tarentaise (8)
168.	UO Albertville (9)	1–1 (2–3 p)	US Grignon (9)
169.	FC Chéran (9)	1–2	ES Drumettaz-Mouxy (8)
170.	ES Saint-Jeoire-La Tour (10)	1–4	JS Chambéry (8)
171.	FC Thônes (9)	0–0 (2–4 p)	ES Chilly (7)
172.	FC Marcellaz-Albanais (11)	0–4	Nivolet FC (8)
173.	CSA Poisy (10)	3–3 (4–3 p)	FC Laissaud (10)
174.	AS Ugine (9)	0–1	US Annecy-le-Vieux (7)
175.	CS Megève (12)	2–5	ASC Sallanches (10)
176.	AG Bons-en-Chablais (10)	1–6	US Annemasse-Gaillard (8)
177.	SC Morzine Vallée d'Aulps (10)	1–3	ES Fillinges (10)
178.	ES Douvaine-Loisin (11)	2–3	AS Saint-Genis-Ferney-Crozet (8)
179.	AS Thonon (11)	2–4	ES Amancy (8)
180.	JS Reignier (9)	0–2	US Semnoz-Vieugy (8)
181.	FC Ballaison (9)	2–2 (5–6 p)	ES Seynod (9)
182.	SS Allinges (9)	1–5	FC Foron (8)
183.	AJ Ville-la-Grand (10)	2–4	US Divonne (8)
184.	CS La Balme-de-Sillingy (10)	1–4	US Pringy (8)
185.	Haut Giffre FC (9)	– (Note: Match abandoned after 55 minutes, with the scoreline 3–0, after a fight involving players from both teams and spectators. Both sides removed from the competition.)	CS Amphion Publier (8)
186.	FRS Champanges (11)	1–2	FC La Filière (10)
187.	AS Le Lyaud-Armoy (11)	0–2	US Mont Blanc (8)
188.	Marignier Sports (9)	1–1 (4–1 p)	Vallée du Giers FC (8)
189.	FC Semine (11)	0–7	ES Tarentaise (7)

=== Third round ===
These matches were played on 19 and 20 September 2020, with one postponed until 27 September 2020.

Third round results: Auvergne-Rhône-Alpes
Tie no	Home team (tier)	Score	Away team (tier)
1.	US Lignerolles-Lavault Sainte-Anne (8)	1–2	FC Riom (6)
2.	CS Bessay (9)	0–4	AS Domerat (6)
3.	Bézenet-Doyet Foot (8)	4–1	Bourbon Sportif (9)
4.	FC Châtel-Guyon (7)	1–1 (4–3 p)	RC Vichy (6)
5.	AS Varennes-sur-Allier (8)	1–0	FC Nord Limagne (9)
6.	AA Lapalisse (7)	3–0	US Maringues (8)
7.	AS Boucetoise (10)	1–2	AS Cellule (9)
8.	AS Gennetinoise (10)	1–6	AS Nord Vignoble (8)
9.	AS Dompierroise (9)	2–1	SC Saint-Pourcain (7)
10.	FC Souvigny (10)	0–1	SA Thiers (6)
11.	Montluçon FC (11)	2–6	CS Volvic (6)
12.	AS Cheminots Saint-Germain (7)	1–3	Montluçon Football (5)
13.	US Vallon (10)	2–2 (4–2 p)	FCUS Ambert (7)
14.	AS Yolet (9)	0–2	AS Romagnat (9)
15.	AS Sansacoise (8)	2–3	US Issoire (7)
16.	US Saint-Gervaisienne (10)	0–6	FC Ally Mauriac (7)
17.	ES Pierrefortaise (8)	0–2	Lempdes Sport (6)
18.	Sporting Chataigneraie Cantal (6)	0–1	US Saint-Flour (6)
19.	US Brioude (7)	4–0	Parlan-Le Rouget FC (8)
20.	US Murat (8)	2–2 (1–3 p)	Ytrac Foot (6)
21.	Dômes-Sancy Foot (8)	1–3	US Beaumontoise (7)
22.	CS Vézac (9)	1–7	FC Aurillac Arpajon Cantal Auvergne (5)
23.	US Crandelles (9)	2–2 (7–6 p)	Cébazat Sports (6)
24.	Portugal FC Clermont Aubière (10)	4–2	AS Belbexoise (9)
25.	Retournac Sportif (7)	1–2	US Blavozy (6)
26.	US Les Martres-de-Veyre (8)	1–2	US Mozac (8)
27.	AS Job (9)	1–3	US Vic-le-Comte (8)
28.	Clermont Métropole FC (9)	2–3	AS Moissat (10)
29.	AS Saint-Jacques (6)	1–1 (5–4 p)	FC Espaly (6)
30.	Association Vergongheon-Arvant (7)	0–0 (3–4 p)	US Saint-Beauzire (8)
31.	Olympic Saint-Julien-Chapteuil (8)	0–4	Velay FC (5)
32.	US Bassin Minier (9)	1–6	FC Cournon-d'Auvergne (7)
33.	US Vals Le Puy (9)	6–4	Solignac-Cussac FC (9)
34.	AS Grazac-Lapte (9)	3–4	CS Pont-de-Dore (10)
35.	US Sucs et Lignon (7)	0–0 (4–1 p)	Sauveteurs Brivois (8)
36.	US Bains-Saint-Christophe (9)	3–3 (6–5 p)	FA Le Cendre (6)
37.	Deux Rochers FC (11)	1–3	Olympique Ruomsois (8)
38.	FC Val Lyonnais (8)	3–0	FC Péageois (9)
39.	FC Eyrieux Embroye (8)	1–3	FC Bourgoin-Jallieu (5)
40.	FC Crolles-Bernin (9)	0–1	AS Donatienne (8)
41.	US Bas-Vivarais (11)	0–6	Olympique Saint-Marcellin (7)
42.	US Montgasconnaise (11)	0–8	Olympique de Valence (6)
43.	Valence FC (9)	1–2	FC Rhône Vallées (6)
44.	FC Vallée de la Gresse (8)	2–4	CO Châteauneuvois (9)
45.	FC Rochegudien (12)	2–0	US Drôme Provence (12)
46.	US Gières (7)	1–3	AS Sud Ardèche (7)
47.	Football Côte Saint-André (7)	0–1	ES Manival (7)
48.	CS Miribel (11)	0–6	Olympique Saint-Genis-Laval (7)
49.	FC Colombier Saint Barthélemy (12)	0–2	FC Montélimar (10)
50.	FC Bren (12)	2–1	FR Allan (10)
51.	RC Mauves (10)	1–9	AC Seyssinet (6)
52.	CO Donzère (11)	4–0	OC Eybens (8)
53.	ES Rachais (8)	1–1 (5–3 p)	FC Bourg-lès-Valence (9)
54.	FC Larnage-Serves (11)	1–2	SC Cruas (8)
55.	Saint-Martin-d'Hères FC (9)	0–0 (5–3 p)	FC Allobroges Asafia (9)
56.	AS Saint-André-le-Gaz (9)	1–4	FC Échirolles (6)
57.	ES Beaumonteleger (11)	1–3	FC Seyssins (8)
58.	Roannais Foot 42 (7)	1–1 (4–3 p)	Rhône Crussol Foot 07 (8)
59.	RC Tournon-Tain (11)	1–5	L'Étrat-La Tour Sportif (8)
60.	JS Cellieu (10)	0–3	FC Saint-Étienne (8)
61.	Entente Crest-Aouste (7)	2–0	US Villars (8)
62.	Stade Amplepuisien (8)	3–2	FCO Firminy-Insersport (6)
63.	US Feurs (6)	7–0 (Note: Tie reversed from original draw.)	Nord Roannais (11)
64.	Sorbiers-La Talaudière (8)	1–1 (1–3 p)	Sud Lyonnais Foot (7)
65.	AS Chavanay (7)	1–2	AS Moulins (5)
66.	US L'Horme (10)	3–0	US Briennon (11)
67.	UMS Montélimar (7)	0–0 (3–4 p)	US Monistrol (8)
68.	FC Saint-Paul-en-Jarez (9)	1–3	FC Dunières (8)
69.	ES Doizieux-La Terrasse-sur-Dorlay (11)	0–4	FC Roche-Saint-Genest (7)
70.	SEL Saint-Priest-en-Jarez (8)	0–0 (2–4 p)	ES Veauche (7)
71.	Olympique Le Coteau (10)	1–5	Olympique Salaise Rhodia (6)
72.	AS Saint-Just-Saint-Rambert (10)	4–2	US Ecotay-Moingt (10)
73.	US Renaisonnaise Apchonnaise (10)	0–4	Côte Chaude Sportif (7)
74.	US Replonges (10)	0–4	CS Neuville (7)
75.	Côtière Meximieux Villieu (12)	0–9	US Feillens (7)
76.	FC Veyle Sâone (8)	0–4	AS Misérieux-Trévoux (6)
77.	ES Bressane Marboz (7)	0–0 (3–4 p)	CS Viriat (8)
78.	CS Lagnieu (8)	1–0	FC Dombes-Bresse (9)
79.	CS Nivolas-Vermelle (9)	0–4	FC La Tour-Saint-Clair (7)
80.	US Culoz Grand Colombier (10)	1–1 (3–0 p)	AS Domarin (8)
81.	AS Saint-Laurentin (10)	0–5	Ain Sud Foot (5)
82.	FC Bressans (8)	2–1	FC Charvieu-Chavagneux (8)
83.	FC Saint-Romain-de-Popey (10)	0–2	Oyonnax Plastics Vallée FC (8)
84.	ES Foissiat-Étrez (8)	2–2 (1–4 p)	FC Bords de Saône (7)
85.	FC Reneins Vauxonne (11)	1–4	Domtac FC (7)
86.	AS Craponne (8)	2–1	AC Rive-de-Gier (8)
87.	CS Verpillière (8)	0–2	FC Lyon (6)
88.	FC Sud Ouest 69 (10)	1–3	Roanne AS Parc du Sport (8)
89.	Olympique Rillieux (9)	2–4	AS Montchat Lyon (7)
90.	CS Meginand (9)	0–1	Saint-Chamond Foot (7)
91.	AS Buers Villeurbanne (11)	0–3	FC Limonest Saint-Didier (5)
92.	Ménival FC (9)	1–3	AS Bron Grand Lyon (8)
93.	US Beaurepairoise (11)	0–10	Chassieu Décines FC (6)
94.	MOS Trois Rivières (7)	0–1	Hauts Lyonnais (5)
95.	FC Fontaines-sur-Saône (10)	0–8	Vénissieux FC (6)
96.	Olympique Vaulx-en-Venlin (10)	1–1 (3–5 p)	US Meyzieu (8)
97.	FC Varèze (8)	2–1	FC Saint-Cyr Collonges au Mont d'Or (8)
98.	US Arbent Marchon (8)	4–2	FC Colombier-Satolas (9)
99.	FC Saint-Michel Sports (11)	0–4	ES Seynod (9)
100.	US Annecy-le-Vieux (7)	1–0	Nivolet FC (8)
101.	US Semnoz-Vieugy (8)	1–1 (4–2 p)	JS Chambéry (8)
102.	FC La Filière (10)	2–0	US Grignon (9)
103.	US Divonne (8)	2–0	FC Belle Étoile Mercury (9)
104.	US Annemasse-Gaillard (8)	2–3	AS Saint-Genis-Ferney-Crozet (8)
105.	ES Fillinges (10)	2–0	CSA Poisy (10)
106.	Thonon Évian FC (5)	3–0	Aix-les-Bains FC (6)
107.	ASC Sallanches (10)	1–2	ES Drumettaz-Mouxy (8)
108.	ES Tarentaise (7)	2–2 (4–5 p)	Chambéry SF (5)
109.	ES Amancy (8)	3–1	Marignier Sports (9)
110.	ES Chilly (7)	4–3	US Mont Blanc (8)
111.	FC Foron (8)	0–2	Cluses-Scionzier FC (6)
112.	winner match 185	– (Note: Match void due to both teams from match 185 being removed from the competition.)	US Corbelin (10)
113.	USC Aiguebelle (10)	2–2 (3–2 p)	US Pringy (8)

=== Fourth round ===
These matches were played on 3 and 4 October 2020.

Fourth round results: Auvergne-Rhône-Alpes
Tie no	Home team (tier)	Score	Away team (tier)
1.	AS Moissat (10)	0–0 (4–3 p)	US Crandelles (9)
2.	US Vic-le-Comte (8)	1–4	US Saint-Flour (6)
3.	US Bains-Saint-Christophe (9)	1–5	FC Aurillac Arpajon Cantal Auvergne (5)
4.	FC Dunières (8)	1–4	Velay FC (5)
5.	Ytrac Foot (6)	1–0	AS Saint-Jacques (6)
6.	FC Ally Mauriac (7)	0–2	US Sucs et Lignon (7)
7.	US Brioude (7)	0–3	Le Puy Foot 43 Auvergne (4)
8.	US Monistrol (8)	2–0	US Saint-Beauzire (8)
9.	Portugal FC Clermont Aubière (10)	1–3	US Vals Le Puy (9)
10.	US Blavozy (6)	6–0	FC Riom (6)
11.	AS Domerat (6)	3–2	Lempdes Sport (6)
12.	US Vallon (10)	0–5	US Issoire (7)
13.	CS Pont-de-Dore (10)	1–3	AS Dompierroise (9)
14.	Bézenet-Doyet Foot (8)	0–1	FC Chamalières (4)
15.	US Mozac (8)	2–1	FC Châtel-Guyon (7)
16.	SA Thiers (6)	2–1	CS Volvic (6)
17.	AS Varennes-sur-Allier (8)	0–9	Moulins Yzeure Foot (4)
18.	AS Romagnat (9)	2–0	Montluçon Football (5)
19.	AS Nord Vignoble (8)	1–0	FC Cournon-d'Auvergne (7)
20.	AA Lapalisse (7)	3–4	AS Moulins (5)
21.	AS Cellule (9)	0–9	US Beaumontoise (7)
22.	FC Rochegudien (12)	0–2	AS Donatienne (8)
23.	AS Sud Ardèche (7)	1–0	Hauts Lyonnais (5)
24.	Olympique Saint-Genis-Laval (7)	0–2	Olympique Saint-Marcellin (7)
25.	CO Châteauneuvois (9)	1–5	AS Craponne (8)
26.	FC Montélimar (10)	0–1	FC Rhône Vallées (6)
27.	Olympique Ruomsois (8)	2–2 (2–4 p)	Olympique Salaise Rhodia (6)
28.	SC Cruas (8)	0–4	Andrézieux-Bouthéon FC (4)
29.	US Feurs (6)	1–0	Entente Crest-Aouste (7)
30.	FC Val Lyonnais (8)	2–3	Olympique de Valence (6)
31.	Saint-Martin-d'Hères FC (9)	1–0	ES Veauche (7)
32.	Sud Lyonnais Foot (7)	2–0	FC Saint-Étienne (8)
33.	FC Bren (12)	2–6	CO Donzère (11)
34.	L'Étrat-La Tour Sportif (8)	1–2	FC Bourgoin-Jallieu (5)
35.	FC Bords de Saône (7)	0–1	Stade Amplepuisien (8)
36.	US Culoz Grand Colombier (10)	1–2	Roanne AS Parc du Sport (8)
37.	AS Bron Grand Lyon (8)	2–1	FC Lyon (6)
38.	AS Saint-Just-Saint-Rambert (10)	1–3	Roannais Foot 42 (7)
39.	Chassieu Décines FC (6)	2–0	Chambéry SF (5)
40.	Côte Chaude Sportif (7)	2–3	AS Saint-Priest (4)
41.	AS Misérieux-Trévoux (6)	0–0 (2–4 p)	FC Roche-Saint-Genest (7)
42.	CS Neuville (7)	2–1	CS Viriat (8)
43.	Oyonnax Plastics Vallée FC (8)	1–1 (4–2 p)	ES Drumettaz-Mouxy (8)
44.	Domtac FC (7)	1–2	GOAL FC (4)
45.	US Corbelin (10)	1–7	FC Limonest Saint-Didier (5)
46.	US L'Horme (10)	0–1	US Meyzieu (8)
47.	FC Varèze (8)	1–1 (3–4 p)	FC Échirolles (6)
48.	Vénissieux FC (6)	1–0	Saint-Chamond Foot (7)
49.	AS Montchat Lyon (7)	4–0	FC Seyssins (8)
50.	ES Seynod (9)	4–0	FC La Filière (10)
51.	Ain Sud Foot (5)	1–1 (6–7 p)	Thonon Évian FC (5)
52.	US Semnoz-Vieugy (8)	2–0	ES Rachais (8)
53.	US Divonne (8)	3–5	GFA Rumilly-Vallières (4)
54.	AC Seyssinet (6)	8–1	ES Chilly (7)
55.	ES Fillinges (10)	1–1 (4–5 p)	ES Manival (7)
56.	USC Aiguebelle (10)	0–1	CS Lagnieu (8)
57.	US Feillens (7)	3–1	ES Amancy (8)
58.	FC La Tour-Saint-Clair (7)	2–2 (2–4 p)	FC Bressans (8)
59.	Cluses-Scionzier FC (6)	0–2	US Annecy-le-Vieux (7)
60.	AS Saint-Genis-Ferney-Crozet (8)	1–1 (2–3 p)	US Arbent Marchon (8)

=== Fifth round ===
These matches were played on 17 and 18 October 2020.

Fifth round results: Auvergne-Rhône-Alpes
Tie no	Home team (tier)	Score	Away team (tier)
1.	US Saint-Flour (6)	0–0 (3–4 p)	AS Domerat (6)
2.	US Sucs et Lignon (7)	0–1	US Mozac (8)
3.	US Issoire (7)	0–2	Le Puy Foot 43 Auvergne (4)
4.	AS Moulins (5)	5–1	Ytrac Foot (6)
5.	US Vals Le Puy (9)	1–1 (4–5 p)	AS Dompierroise (9)
6.	US Beaumontoise (7)	2–2 (4–2 p)	Sporting Club Lyon (3)
7.	FC Aurillac Arpajon Cantal Auvergne (5)	1–0	US Blavozy (6)
8.	AS Moissat (10)	1–4	AS Nord Vignoble (8)
9.	AS Romagnat (9)	0–5	FC Chamalières (4)
10.	US Monistrol (8)	1–1 (7–8 p) (Note: Tie reversed from original draw.)	Roanne AS Parc du Sport (8)
11.	US Feurs (6)	1–1 (5–4 p)	Sud Lyonnais Foot (7)
12.	Olympique de Valence (6)	3–3 (4–5 p)	FC Villefranche (3)
13.	SA Thiers (6)	0–3 (Note: Tie won by means of forfeit.)	AS Saint-Priest (4)
14.	CO Donzère (11)	0–1	AS Sud Ardèche (7)
15.	AS Donatienne (8)	0–4	Andrézieux-Bouthéon FC (4)
16.	Velay FC (5)	2–0	FC Roche-Saint-Genest (7)
17.	US Meyzieu (8)	2–2 (2–4 p)	Olympique Salaise Rhodia (6)
18.	FC Échirolles (6)	0–2	Roannais Foot 42 (7)
19.	AS Bron Grand Lyon (8)	0–1	Vénissieux FC (6)
20.	FC Bressans (8)	0–2	FC Rhône Vallées (6)
21.	GOAL FC (4)	3–2	Football Bourg-en-Bresse Péronnas 01 (3)
22.	CS Neuville (7)	1–2	FC Limonest Saint-Didier (5)
23.	Olympique Saint-Marcellin (7)	0–2	Moulins Yzeure Foot (4)
24.	Stade Amplepuisien (8)	2–2 (11–10 p)	AS Montchat Lyon (7)
25.	AS Craponne (8)	5–0	Saint-Martin-d'Hères FC (9)
26.	CS Lagnieu (8)	0–0 (3–4 p)	ES Manival (7)
27.	US Arbent Marchon (8)	0–2	Annecy FC (3)
28.	US Feillens (7)	1–3	Thonon Évian FC (5)
29.	FC Bourgoin-Jallieu (5)	4–1	Chassieu Décines FC (6)
30.	ES Seynod (9)	2–1	US Semnoz-Vieugy (8)
31.	Oyonnax Plastics Vallée FC (8)	0–1	GFA Rumilly-Vallières (4)
32.	US Annecy-le-Vieux (7)	0–2	AC Seyssinet (6)

=== Sixth round ===
These matches were played on 30 and 31 January 2021.

Sixth round results: Auvergne-Rhône-Alpes
Tie no	Home team (tier)	Score	Away team (tier)
1.	Le Puy Foot 43 Auvergne (4)	3–0 (Note: Velay FC forfeited the tie, stating they would not play under the current conditions relating to COVID-19.)	Velay FC (5)
2.	Roannais Foot 42 (7)	1–1 (2–4 p)	FC Aurillac Arpajon Cantal Auvergne (5)
3.	AS Nord Vignoble (8)	3–3 (4–3 p)	AS Craponne (8)
4.	US Feurs (6)	5–1	AS Moulins (5)
5.	US Beaumontoise (7)	0–2	FC Chamalières (4)
6.	AS Domerat (6)	0–6	Moulins Yzeure Foot (4)
7.	AS Dompierroise (9)	0–3 (Note: AS Dompierroise forfeited the tie, stating they would not play under the current conditions relating to COVID-19.)	Andrézieux-Bouthéon FC (4)
8.	US Mozac (8)	0–12	FC Villefranche (3)
9.	Thonon Évian FC (5)	2–1	GOAL FC (4)
10.	Stade Amplepuisien (8)	2–4	Vénissieux FC (6)
11.	FC Bourgoin-Jallieu (5)	1–4	Annecy FC (3)
12.	AC Seyssinet (6)	2–2 (5–4 p)	AS Sud Ardèche (7)
13.	Olympique Salaise Rhodia (6)	1–2	FC Limonest Saint-Didier (5)
14.	ES Manival (7)	0–3 (Note: ES Manival forfeited the tie, stating they would not play under the current conditions relating to COVID-19.)	GFA Rumilly-Vallières (4)
15.	ES Seynod (9)	0–2	AS Saint-Priest (4)
16.	Roanne AS Parc du Sport (8)	1–4	FC Rhône Vallées (6)
