= 2017–18 Coupe de France preliminary rounds, Auvergne-Rhône-Alpes =

The 2017–18 Coupe de France preliminary rounds, Auvergne-Rhône-Alpes are football competitions.

== First round ==
The matches in Auvergne-Rhône-Alpes were played on 18, 19 and 20 August 2017.

First round results: Auvergne-Rhône-Alpes

Tie no	Home team (tier)	Score	Away team (tier)
1.	CS Bessay (9)	2–0	US Vendat (8)
2.	Magnet-Suillet-St Gérand (10)	1–2	AC Creuzier-le-Vieux (8)
3.	AS Le Breuil (10)	2–2 (1–2 p)	Commentry FC (8)
4.	AS Neuilly-le-Réal (10)	1–3	AS Varennes-sur-Allier (8)
5.	CS Targetois (10)	1–1 (3–4 p)	AS Billezois (10)
6.	FC Creuzier-le-Neuf (12)	6–1	AS Montvicq (11)
7.	US Trezelles (10)	1–5	ES Vernetoise (8)
8.	Espoir Molinetois (9)	2–3	AS Gennetinoise (9)
9.	US Cœur Allier (10)	0–3	FC Souvigny (8)
10.	AS Mercy-Chapeau (10)	1–8	Etoile Moulins Yzeure (10)
11.	US Saulcet-Le Theil (10)	1–3	AS Tronget (9)
12.	AS Villebret (10)	1–4	SC Avermes (9)
13.	OC Montenay-sur-Allier (11)	0–1	AS Val de Sioule (10)
14.	ES St Plaisir (12)	5–0	AS Chassenard Luneau (11)
15.	US Bien-Assis Montluçon (10)	4–2	Bourbon Sportif (9)
16.	ALS Chamblet (10)	0–6	Stade St Yorre (9)
17.	AS Cérilly (9)	3–0	US Biachette Désertines (9)
18.	US St Désiré (11)	0–4	AS Louchy (9)
19.	US St Victor (10)	0–8	Bézenet-Doyet Foot (8)
20.	US Marcillat-Pionsat (10)	2–0	SC Gannat (9)
21.	US Abrest (10)	2–5	US Vallon (9)
22.	AS Néris (10)	1–1 (3–5 p)	AS Toulonnaise (9)
23.	AL Quinssaines (10)	3–1	US Toque Huriel (10)
24.	FC Chappelle Molles (10)	2–3	ES Diou (10)
25.	Bellerive-Brugheas Foot (10)	0–2	AS Châtel-de-Neuvre (10)
26.	US Malicorne (11)	1–6	FC Billy-Crechy (8)
27.	Montluçon FC (11)	4–4 (2–4 p)	FC Haut d'Allier (9)
28.	JS Neuvy (10)	5–2	Vigilante Garnat St Martin (10)
29.	Ballon Beaulonnais (10)	0–3	US Lignerolles-Lavault Ste Anne (9)
30.	AS St Angel (11)	1–1 (5–4 p)	FC Couleuvre (11)
31.	Médiéval Club Montluçonnais (10)	1–3	AS Nord Vignoble (8)
32.	AS Lurcy-Lévis (9)	1–3	AS Dompierroise (9)
33.	AS Montluçon Chatelard (11)	0–1	CS Vaux-Estivareilles (11)
34.	FR Pouzy-Mésangy (10)	3–3 (4–2 p)	CS Cosne D'Allier (9)
35.	ES St Étienne-de-Vicq/Bost (11)	2–1	CS Thiel-sur-Acolin (11)
36.	AS Salignoise (11)	0–4	US Varennes-sur-Tèche (10)
37.	AS Pléaux-Rilhac-Barriac (11)	4–3	ES Pierrefortaise (8)
38.	AS St Just (11)	0–3	AS Yolet (9)
39.	FC Minier (11)	1–0 (Note: Match abandoned after 80 minutes due to fighting. Both teams disqualified from the competition.)	AS Belbexoise (10)
40.	Carladez Goul Sportif (9)	1–4	AS Sansacoise (8)
41.	AS Ayrens/St Illide (9)	2–0	ES St Mamet (8)
42.	AS Badailhac (12)	1–2	FC Massiac-Molompize-Blesle (8)
43.	ES Margeride (11)	1–7	US Murat (8)
44.	FC Hauts de Cère (12)	2–1	US La Chapelle-Laurent (10)
45.	Sud Cantal Foot (9)	1–4	US Crandelles (9)
46.	US La Garde Loubaresse (11)	2–3	US Besse (11)
47.	CS Vézac (11)	2–3	Cère FC Vic/Polminhac (9)
48.	US Cère et Landes (11)	1–3	FC des Quatre Vallées (9)
49.	Saignes FC (11)	12–1	US Haut-Célé (11)
50.	ES Roannaise (12)	1–1 (1–3 p)	ES Riomois-Condat (8)
51.	ES Vebret-Ydes (11)	3–1	FC Junhac-Montsalvy (9)
52.	FC Albepierre-Bredons (12)	5–2	FC Coltines (11)
53.	AS Espinat (10)	2–3	FC Artense (9)
54.	AS Laussonne (10)	0–2	SC Langogne (8)
55.	SS Ussonaise (12)	1–2	US Bassoise (9)
56.	US Bains-St Christophe (9)	0–3	US Sucs et Lignon (8)
57.	AS Riotordoise (12)	1–3	AS St Didier-St Just (8)
58.	Montregard JL Raucoules (10)	1–3	Retournac Sportif (9)
59.	ES Lempdaise (12)	1–5	FC Aurec (9)
60.	Aiguilhe FC (11)	2–5	FC St Germain Laprade (9)
61.	FC Tence (11)	2–3	CO Craponne (10)
62.	AS Loudes (9)	2–0	AS Cheminots Langeac (9)
63.	US Arsac-en-Velay (9)	1–3	AS Emblavez-Vorey (8)
64.	AS Montfaucon (11)	0–3	AG Sigolenoise (10)
65.	US Landos (11)	2–0	Olympic St Julien-Chapteuil (8)
66.	St Jeures SJ (13)	0–5	AS Grazac-Lapte (8)
67.	AS Mazet-Chambon (12)	0–4	FC Dunières (9)
68.	AS St Just-St Rambert (10)	2–4	Sauveteurs Brivois (8)
69.	AS Villettoise (10)	2–1	AS Pertuis (10)
70.	FC Vézézoux (10)	0–2	AS Beaulieu (10)
71.	FC Mirefleurs (11)	3–0	AS Moissat (10)
72.	FC Randan (12)	0–2	FC Aubierois (10)
73.	AS St Ours (10)	1–3	RC Charbonnières-Paugnat (10)
74.	FC Blanzat (9)	1–4	US Issoire (8)
75.	ES St Germinoise (9)	4–1	AS Enval-Marsat (8)
76.	ES St Sauves-Tauves (12)	1–3	AS Royat (10)
77.	AS Cellule (10)	4–4 (2–4 p)	US Les Martres-de-Veyre (8)
78.	AS Escoutoux (11)	0–4	AI St Babel (8)
79.	US Lapeyrouse (10)	0–5	FC Châtel-Guyon (8)
80.	ES Volcans Malauzat (11)	0–2	Dômes-Sancy Foot (9)
81.	FC Lezoux (10)	2–3	US Courpière (9)
82.	ALS Besse Egliseneuve (9)	0–3	US Maringues (8)
83.	US Menat-Neuf-Eglise (10)	0–1	CS St Bonnet-près-Riom (9)
84.	FF Chappes (11)	3–2	US St Gervaisienne (10)
85.	US Mozac (9)	2–3	EFC St Amant-Tallende (8)
86.	US Arlancoise (12)	1–5	US Orcet (10)
87.	AS Orcines (11)	3–1	Pérignat FC (8)
88.	CS Auzatois (12)	2–6	La Combelle CAB (8)
89.	RC Laqueuille (13)	1–3	Clermont Métropole FC (9)
90.	RC St Clément-de-Régnat (11)	0–5	CO Veyre-Monton (9)
91.	US Les Martres-d'Artière (10)	0–7	AS St Genès-Champanelle (8)
92.	US Val de Couze Chambon (10)	3–1	SC Billom (9)
93.	CS Pont-de-Dore (11)	0–1	Ecureuils Franc Rosier (10)
94.	EC Lembronnais (13)	0–2	AGuiRA FC (10)
95.	CS St Anthème (12)	0–2	AS Job (11)
96.	ES Couze Pavin (12)	0–4	FC Mézel (10)
97.	FC Charbonnier-les-Mines (12)	0–5	CSA Brassacois Florinois (9)
98.	RAS Beauregard l'Évêque (10)	2–4 (a.e.t.)	Aulnat Sportif (8)
99.	FC Sayat-Argnat (9)	1–3	JS St Priest-des-Champs (8)
100.	FC Vertaizon (9)	2–3	Espérance Ceyratois Football (8)
101.	US Ennezat (9)	1–1 (1–4 p)	AS Romagnat (8)
102.	ES Saint-Maurice-ès-Allier (11)	0–5	AS Livradois Sud (9)
103.	US Messeix Bourg-Lastic (11)	2–3	FC Nord Combraille (9)
104.	AS Cunlhat (11)	1–3	RC Luzillat (10)
105.	US Ménétrol (11)	0–3	US Gerzat (10)
106.	ES Chanaz (11)	0–3	Entente Val d'Hyères (9)
107.	Cœur de Savoie (10)	1–2	AS Ugine (9)
108.	FC Laissaud (11)	0–2	FC Belle Étoile Mercury (9)
109.	Olympique Albertville FC (9)	1–2	FC St Baldoph (10)
110.	US Modane (10)	2–3	CA Maurienne (9)
111.	AS Cuines-La Chambre Val d'Arc (10)	2–2 (4–2 p)	FC St Michel-de-Maurienne (11)
112.	USC Aiguebelle (12)	5–0	AS Novalaise (10)
113.	AS La Bridoire (11)	3–1	CA Yenne (11)
114.	US Domessin (12)	1–5	US Chartreuse Guiers (10)
115.	AS Barby-Leysse OC (12)	3–6	US La Ravoire (10)
116.	FC Bauges (13)	1–0	FC Beaufortain Queige (12)
117.	AS Brison-St Innocent (12)	3–2	FC Villargondran (10)
118.	Ste Hélène FC (11)	1–5	ES Bourget-du-Lac (10)
119.	US Grand Mont La Bâthie (11)	0–3	FC Haute Tarentaise (9)
120.	US Grignon (10)	0–6	JS Chambéry (8)
121.	US Pontoise (9)	2–1	Chambéry Sport 73 (8)
122.	FC Chambotte (9)	0–1	US Motteraine (8)
123.	ES Drumettaz-Mouxy (9)	3–3 (4–5 p)	Cognin Sports (8)
124.	Montmélian AF (9)	2–4	Nivolet FC (8)
125.	FC Curtafond-Confrançon-St Martin-St Didier (11)	5–5 (6–5 p)	AS Grièges-Pont-de-Veyle (11)
126.	Plaine Revermont Foot (10)	0–1	FC Dombes-Bresse (8)
127.	AS Hautecourt-Romanèche (11)	3–2	FC Manziat (10)
128.	AS Vertrieu (11)	0–4	ES Revermontoise (10)
129.	FC Belley (9)	0–3	CS Lagnieu (8)
130.	Valserine FC (11)	2–4	AS Montréal-la-Cluse (8)
131.	US Vonnas (11)	2–1	AS Bâgé-le-Châtel (10)
132.	FC Lescheroux-St Julien-sur-Reyssouze (11)	0–5	US Dombes-Chalamont (11)
133.	FC Balan (13)	2–3	CSJ Châtillonnaise (11)
134.	Association Portugais Oyonnax (12)	2–4	US Izernore (11)
135.	AS St Étienne-sur-Reyssouze (11)	7–0	Entente Certines-La Tranclière-Tossiat-Journans (12)
136.	AS Chaveyriat-Chanoz (11)	7–1	US St Cyr (12)
137.	US Veyziat (10)	2–0	FC Nurieux-Volognat (11)
138.	St Denis-Ambutrix FC (11)	3–0	AS Travailleurs Turcs Oyonnax (11)
139.	Olympique Buyatin (12)	4–1	Côtière Meximieux-Villeu (11)
140.	US Marsonnas-Jayat-Béreyziat (12)	1–1 (3–5 p)	ES Cormoranche (10)
141.	JS Bettant (12)	2–6	FC de la Plaine de l'Ain (12)
142.	FC Dombes (11)	3–0	FC Mas-Rillier (12)
143.	Olympique St Denis-lès-Bourg (9)	0–3	CS Viriat (8)
144.	CS Chevroux (12)	3–1	FC Bord de Veyle (11)
145.	Bourg Sud (12)	0–1	FC Bords de l'Ain (10)
146.	AS Attignat (11)	6–2	FC Veyle-Vieux-Jonc (12)
147.	FC Priay (12)	2–2 (4–1 p)	ES Ambronay-St Jean-le-Vieux (11)
148.	FC La Vallière (10)	4–1	FC Côtière-Luenaz (9)
149.	US Arbent Marchon (9)	0–5	US Feillens (8)
150.	US Vaux-en-Bugey (12)	1–3	CS Belley (10)
151.	FC Serrières-Villebois (11)	1–5	US Nantua (9)
152.	AS St Laurentine (11)	2–7	ES Foissiat-Étrez (9)
153.	US Replonges (10)	4–3	AS Montrevelloise (9)
154.	Fareins Saône Vallée Foot (9)	1–4	FC Bressans (8)
155.	Concordia FC Bellegarde (9)	2–1	US Culoz Grand Colombier (8)
156.	SC Mille Etangs (12)	1–3	Jassans-Frans Foot (11)
157.	FO Leyment (13)	0–4	US Tenay (11)
158.	AS Guéreins-Genouilleux (12)	1–0	AS Montmerle (10)
159.	FO Bourg (9)	2–1	SC Portes de l'Ain (8)
160.	AS Peyrieu-Brens (13)	1–1 (1–3 p)	FC Bilieu (11)
161.	FC Gavot (12)	3–1	AS Neydens (11)
162.	AS Paremlan Villaz (11)	3–0	AS Lac Bleu (10)
163.	ES Viry (12)	3–1	CS St Pierre (11)
164.	US Argonay (10)	1–0	CS Ayze (11)
165.	FRS Champanges (12)	0–4	Haut Giffre FC (10)
166.	CS La Balme-de-Sillingy (10)	4–5	US Le Châble-Beaumont (11)
167.	AS Portugais Annecy (12)	2–4	ES Valleiry (10)
168.	FC Semine (12)	3–0	FC Marcellaz-Albanais (11)
169.	FC Cranves-Sales (12)	2–1	FC Dingy (11)
170.	ES Lanfonnet (11)	2–3	FC Foron (10)
171.	CSA Poisy (11)	3–0	FC Versoud (11)
172.	FC Cessy-Gex (12)	3–1	ES Sciez (10)
173.	FC Vuache (12)	1–2	ES St Jeoire-La Tour (10)
174.	US Marnaz (12)	0–3	ES Fillinges (10)
175.	AS Évires (12)	1–2	ES Cernex (10)
176.	FC Haut-Rhône (13)	0–5	CO Chavanod (10)
177.	AS Viuz-en-Sallaz (13)	0–4	FC Les Houches-Servoz (12)
178.	UC Turque Thonon-les-Bains (12)	3–0	US St Julien-en-Genevois (10)
179.	ES Douvaine-Loisin (12)	1–2	AS Le Lyaud-Armoy (11)
180.	CS Megève (13)	0–8	US Annemasse-Gaillard (8)
181.	FC Évian (13)	3–1	US Collonges-sous-Salève (11)
182.	SC Morzine Vallée d'Aulps (11)	5–4	ASC Sallanches (10)
183.	AS Prévessin-Moëns (11)	0–1	SS Allinges (9)
184.	Échenevex-Ségny-Chevry Olympique (11)	0–2	ES Chilly (9)
185.	FC Vallée Verte (12)	1–4	FC Cluses (9)
186.	Football St Jeoirien (12)	2–7	FC Chéran (9)
187.	Foot Sud 74 (12)	2–1 (Note: Foot Sud 74 penalised for fielding a suspended player. ES Thyez qualify.)	ES Thyez (9)
188.	FC Léman Presqu'île (12)	1–5	Olympique Cran (9)
189.	Football Sud Gessien (11)	0–0 (2–3 p)	AS St Genis-Ferney-Crozet (9)
190.	FC La Filière (11)	1–1 (4–3 p)	US Semnoz Vieugy (9)
191.	US Challex (11)	1–3	FJ Ambilly (9)
192.	FC Frangy (11)	0–2	FC Ballaison (9)
193.	CA Bonnevillois (10)	3–4	US Mont Blanc (9)
194.	ES Meythet (10)	0–3	FCS Rumilly Albanais (8)
195.	Marignier Sports (10)	3–7	ES Amancy (8)
196.	US Pringy (9)	2–4	US Annecy-le-Vieux (8)
197.	JS Reignier (10)	2–3 (a.e.t.)	ES Seynod (8)
198.	FC Thônes (10)	2–3	US Divonne (8)
199.	AC Poisat (12)	1–3	FC des Collines (11)
200.	US Ruy-Montceau (11)	3–1	Balbins-Ornacieux-Semons Sports (13)
201.	AS Cheyssieu (12)	0–2	Deux Rochers FC (10)
202.	FC Vallée Bleue (13)	8–2	US Montgasconnaise (12)
203.	CS Faramans (13)	1–2	CS Four (11)
204.	FC Liers (12)	2–1	CS Miribel (11)
205.	AS St Lattier (12)	2–1	Union Nord Iséroise (11)
206.	ASF Bourbre (12)	0–1	US Beaurepairoise (11)
207.	JS St Georgeoise (12)	1–2	FC Crolles-Bernin (11)
208.	AS Vézeronce-Huert (11)	5–4	AS St André-le-Gaz (9)
209.	ASL St Cassien (10)	3–3 (a.e.t.) (Note: Match abandoned after 118 minutes due to the referee requesting police intervention. ASL St Cassien penalised, Olympique Nord Dauphiné qualify for the second round.)	Olympique Nord Dauphiné (8)
210.	FC Balmes Nord-Isère (10)	0–5	OC Eybens (8)
211.	FC Sud Isère (10)	0–8	ES Rachais (8)
212.	Formafoot Bièvre Valloire (11)	2–0	MJC St Hilaire-de-la-Côte (12)
213.	ES Izeaux (11)	1–6	US Sassenage (9)
214.	Rives SF (11)	1–2	AS Portugaise Bourgoin-Jallieu (10)
215.	AS Susville-Matheysine (13)	3–2	US St Paul-de-Varces (10)
216.	US Reventin (11)	2–1	CF Estrablin (10)
217.	CS Nivolas (11)	1–2	AS Domarin (10)
218.	FC Chirens (13)	1–2	Champagnier FC (12)
219.	US La Murette (10)	9–0	Le Grand-Lemps/Colombe/Apprieu Foot 38 (11)
220.	Pays d'Allevard (13)	0–2	AS Grésivaudan (11)
221.	Moirans FC (14)	4–0	AS Rivieroise (12)
222.	FC Lauzes (11)	0–1	EF des Étangs (10)
223.	AS Italienne Européenne Grenoble (10)	6–1	Amicale Tunisienne St Martin-d'Hères (11)
224.	FC La Sure (12)	1–0 (Note: FC La Sure penalised for fielding a suspended player. FC Voiron-Moirans qualify.)	FC Voiron-Moirans (11)
225.	US Chatte (11)	0–5	AS Ver Sau (9)
226.	FC Allobroges Asafia (9)	0–3	ES Manival (8)
227.	FC Tignieu-Jameyzieu (11)	1–2	Isle d'Abeau FC (9)
228.	Noyarey FC (11)	1–6	FC Varèze (8)
229.	FC St Martin d'Uriage (12)	3–2	ASJF Domène (10)
230.	AS Martinerois (10)	4–1	US Jarrie-Champ (9)
231.	US Corbelin (11)	0–1	Olympique Villefontaine (12)
232.	US Cassolards-Passageois (12)	1–3	Olympique Les Avenières (12)
233.	FC Seyssins (10)	3–0	AJA Villeneuve (9)
234.	US Creys-Morestel (9)	3–1	AL St Maurice-l'Exil (8)
235.	US Filerin (11)	0–3	FC Commelle-Vernay (9)
236.	FC St Étienne (10)	3–1	AS Savigneux-Montbrison (8)
237.	US Sud Forézienne (10)	2–1	SEL St Priest-en-Jarez (8)
238.	Forez Donzy FC (10)	0–4	US Villars (8)
239.	ES St Rémy-sur-Durolle (11)	1–4	FC Roanne Clermont (9)
240.	AS Chausseterre-Les Salles (12)	2–11	ES Champdieu-Marcilly (9)
241.	S Chambéon-Magneux (9)	4–0	Durolle Foot (8)
242.	FCI St Romain-le-Puy (10)	0–1	FCO Firminy-Insersport (8)
243.	FC Bonson-St Cyprien (10)	1–3	SC Grand-Croix/Lorette (8)
244.	US St Galmier-Chambœuf (9)	2–0	AS Châteauneuf (8)
245.	JS Cellieu (10)	1–0	USG La Fouillouse (8)
246.	AS Sail-les-Bains (13)	0–4	AS Ouest Roannais (11)
247.	FC La Vêtre (12)	0–9	Roanne Matel SFC (10)
248.	US Ecotay-Moingt (12)	1–3	ES Sorbiers (10)
249.	AS St Laurent-la-Conche (12)	1–3	OC Ondaine (10)
250.	ES Doizieux-La Terrasse-sur-Dorlay (12)	2–7	CO La Rivière (10)
251.	Olympique St Étienne (13)	2–2 (5–3 p)	FC Bords de Loire (11)
252.	Bellegarde Sports (11)	2–1	SC St Paul-Amions-Dancé (9)
253.	FC Bourguisan (11)	1–2	US Metare St Étienne Sud-Est (9)
254.	AS Aveizieux (11)	3–2	ES La Talaudière (9)
255.	ES Haut Forez (11)	3–2	FC Chazelles (9)
256.	AJ Chapellois (11)	2–5	AC Rive-de-Gier (9)
257.	SC Piraillon (12)	0–7	L'Étrat-La Tour Sportif (8)
258.	FC Ouches (12)	0–1	AS St Martinoise (10)
259.	FC St Cyr-de-Favières-l'Hôpital (11)	2–1	Riorges FC (10)
260.	CS Cremeaux (11)	0–1	Roanne AS Parc du Sport (10)
261.	CA Panissierèes (12)	4–5	AS Noirétable (11)
262.	Haut Pilat Interfoot (11)	3–3 (2–4 p)	FC St Paul-en-Jarez (10)
263.	AS St Ferréol-Gampille-Firminy (12)	1–3	AF Pays de Coise (11)
264.	FC Genilac (12)	1–2	FC Montrambert Ricamar (11)
265.	FC Lézigneux (12)	3–6	AS St Cyr-les-Vignes (11)
266.	FC Périgneux (12)	2–5	AS Jonzieux (10)
267.	FC Plaine Poncins (12)	1–4	St Étienne UC Terrenoire (11)
268.	Sury SC (12)	3–0	Feu Vert St Chamond (11)
269.	Olympique Est Roannais (12)	1–0	AS Couzan (11)
270.	Entente Plaine Montagne (12)	1–7	Olympique du Montcel (11)
271.	FC Perreux (12)	0–1	ACL Mably (11)
272.	AS St Haon-le-Vieux (12)	2–1	US Villerest (10)
273.	US Briennon (11)	3–2	Olympique Le Coteau (10)
274.	FC Lerptien (12)	5–7	ES St Christo-Marcenod (11)
275.	US L'Horme (12)	3–0	ES St Jean-Bonnefonds (11)
276.	SC St Sixte (12)	0–3	US Renaisonnaise Apchonnaise (11)
277.	St Romain-les-Atheux Sports (13)	1–4	AS Finerbal (11)
278.	AS Portugaise Vaulx-en-Velin (11)	2–1	FC Colombier-Satolas (11)
279.	FC Antillais Villeurbanne (15)	2–11	FC Point du Jour (11)
280.	Rhône Sud FC (12)	2–1	Olympique Viennois (13)
281.	Olympiqe St Quentinois (10)	5–2	St Alban Sportif (11)
282.	CS Vaulxois (11)	0–1	AS Algerienne Villeurbanne (10)
283.	Olympique Rillieux (11)	1–6	ES Genas Azieu (10)
284.	FC St Fons (13)	1–5	Muroise Foot (11)
285.	ASM St Pierre-la-Palud (11)	2–6	FC Rive Droite (10)
286.	Eveil Lyon (11)	0–1	JSO Givors (11)
287.	AS Sornins Réunis (12)	2–2 (4–5 p)	Haute Brévenne Foot (9)
288.	Olympique Vaulx-en-Venlin (10)	2–1	AS Grézieu-la-Varenne (11)
289.	GOS Couzon (11)	1–7	JS Irigny (10)
290.	AS Confluence (11)	0–3	FC Ste Foy-lès-Lyon (10)
291.	AS Dardilly (11)	4–5	AS St Forgeux (10)
292.	US Formans (12)	2–4	AS Buers Villeurbanne (10)
293.	CO St Fons (9)	2–1	FC Grigny (8)
294.	FC Anthon (12)	3–2	FC Sud Ouest 69 (10)
295.	FC Sourcieux-les-Mines (11)	1–4	FC St Cyr Collonges au Mont d'Or (10)
296.	AL Mions (9)	0–5	FC Chaponnay-Marennes (8)
297.	USF Tarare (12)	2–1	Sud Azergues Foot (9)
298.	FC Franchevilloise (12)	4–3	AS Grézieu-le-Marché (11)
299.	CS Ozon (10)	0–5	CS Meginand (8)
300.	CS Verpillière (10)	1–1 (2–3 p)	AS Manissieux (9)
301.	Association Chandieu-Heyrieux (10)	0–0 (1–5 p)	US Vaulx-en-Velin (9)
302.	Ménival FC (9)	1–2	Sud Lyonnais Foot (8)
303.	SC Maccabi Lyon (11)	1–4	AS Villefontaine (10)
304.	RC Beligny (11)	3–3 (2–3 p)	Latino AFC Lyon (12)
305.	FC Rontalon (13)	0–4	ES Chaponost (11)
306.	US Des Monts (11)	6–3	AS Diversité Villeurbanne (12)
307.	US Cheminots Lyon Vaise (10)	4–3	ACS Mayotte du Rhône (11)
308.	FC Pays de l'Arbresle (10)	6–2	US Montanay (10)
309.	FC Deux Fontaines (11)	1–2	AS St Martin-en-Haut (10)
310.	US Loire-sur-Rhône (9)	1–2	US Millery-Vourles (8)
311.	USM Pierre-Bénite (11)	1–2	AS Rhodanienne (10)
312.	US Venissieux (10)	0–3	FC Val Lyonnais (8)
313.	CAS Cheminots Oullins Lyon (10)	1–2	FC Gerland (11)
314.	GS Chasse-sur-Rhône (10)	0–2	Feyzin Club Belle Étoile (9)
315.	AS Villeurbanne Éveil Lyonnais (10)	2–4	FC Corbas (9)
316.	Chazay FC (9)	2–5	US Meyzieu (8)
317.	Entente Odenas-Charentay-St Lager (10)	3–2	CS Neuville (8)
318.	AS Arnas (12)	0–2 (a.e.t.)	Stade Amplepuisien (10)
319.	FC St Romain-de-Popey (10)	0–1	ES Lamurien (9)
320.	Beaujolais Football (10)	6–3	AS Cours (11)
321.	SO Pont-de-Chéruy-Chavanoz (9)	3–1	AS Bellecour-Perrache (8)
322.	ASC Gle Routière Maïa Sonnier (11)	0–4	ES Charly Foot (10)
323.	FC Croix Roussien (12)	2–2 (4–5 p)	UO Tassin-la-Demi-Lune (11)
324.	ASA Clochemerle (12)	2–3	AS Genay (11)
325.	ES Lierguois (10)	2–4	FC Pontcharra-St Loup (9)
326.	AS Brignais (11)	0–4	FC Franc Lyonnais (11)
327.	Chambost-Allières-St Just-d'Avray (10)	2–3	AS Denicé (11)
328.	AS Craponne (9)	3–2	AS Montchat Lyon (8)
329.	Olympic Sathonay (10)	0–1	ES Trinité Lyon (9)
330.	US Est Lyonnais (9)	3–2	Lyon Croix Rousse Football (10)
331.	US Beaujolais Vauxonne (11)	3–2	Lyon Ouest SC (8)
332.	ES Nord Drôme (11)	2–1	US Mours (9)
333.	ASL Génissieux (11)	3–1	US Pont-La Roche (9)
334.	FC Muzolais (11)	0–1	FC Chabeuil (9)
335.	AS Berg-Helvie (9)	1–3	FC Valdaine (8)
336.	AS Véore Montoison (9)	1–2	Olympique Rhodia (8)
337.	Entente Sarras Sports St Vallier (10)	1–3	FC Péageois (8)
338.	FC Pays Viennois (9)	1–6	FC Annonay (8)
339.	FC Chanas (10)	0–2	AS Donatienne (8)
340.	ASF Pierrelatte (9)	0–2	Olympique Ruomsois (8)
341.	FC Montélimar (10)	3–2	US Portes Hautes Cévennes (8)
342.	FC Portois (11)	0–1	Entente Crest-Aouste (8)
343.	AS Vercors (13)	1–7	FC Montmiral-Parnans (12)
344.	FC Mahorais Drôme Ardèche (13)	1–8	AS Dolon (10)
345.	FC Rochegudien (13)	2–3	FC Félines-St Cyr-Peaugres (11)
346.	FC Clérieux-St Bardoux-Granges-les-Beaumont (13)	0–3	FC Rambertois (11)
347.	FC Pays de Bourdeaux (13)	5–2	AS St Marcelloise (11)
348.	FC Rochepaule (14)	0–3	CO Donzère (12)
349.	Glun FC (12)	3–6	Vallis Auréa Foot (10)
350.	FC Hauterives/US Grand-Serre (12)	1–0	AS Cornas (10)
351.	Vivar SC Soyons (11)	2–1	US Val d'Ay (9)
352.	PS Romanaise (11)	2–2 (4–3 p)	FC Eyrieux Embroye (9)
353.	US Davézieux-Vidalon (11)	6–1	AS Portugaise Valence (9)
354.	US 2 Vallons (13)	1–2	AS Homenetmen Bourg-lès Valence (11)
355.	FC La Coucourde (13)	4–5 (a.e.t.)	JS St Privat (11)
356.	FC St Restitut (13)	3–1	FC Vallon-Pont-d'Arc (11)
357.	Borussia Valence FC (13)	2–1	US Rochemaure (11)
358.	FC Bathernay (13)	0–9	ES Malissardoise (12)
359.	IF Barbières-Bésayes-Rochefort-Samson-Marches (13)	0–6	RC Mauves (10)
360.	Football Mont-Pilat (9)	6–3	FC Annonay (8)
361.	OS Vallée de l'Ouvèze (12)	2–4	US Vallée du Jabron (10)
362.	FC Bren (12)	1–2 (a.e.t.)	FC Goubetois (11)
363.	AS La Sanne (12)	5–4	US Croix du Fraysse (11)
364.	ES Trèfle (12)	0–5	FC Serrières-Sablons (10)
365.	AS Vanséenne (12)	1–1 (5–4 p)	US St Just-St Marcel (11)
366.	FC Colombier-St Barthélemy (12)	1–7	Rhône Crussol Foot 07 (10)
367.	ES St Jeure-d'Ay-Marsan (12)	2–6	JS Allexoise (11)
368.	CS Châteauneuf-de-Galaure (12)	4–0	US Peyrins (13)
369.	Inter Haute Herbasse (12)	0–1	FC Bourg-lès-Valence (10)
370.	US St Gervais-sur-Roubion (12)	2–1	US Montmeyran (11)
371.	RC Savasson (12)	2–3	US Vals-les-Bains (11)
372.	FC Aubenas (12)	4–0	AS La Bastide Puylaurent (11)
373.	Diois FC (13)	1–1 (4–3 p)	FC Sauzet (12)
374.	AS Vernoux (13)	0–3	CO Châteauneuvois (11)
375.	FC Alboussière (12)	2–0	AS Valensolles (10)
376.	CS Lapeyrousien (13)	1–4	FC 540 (11)
377.	ES St Alban-Grospierre (13)	1–6	SC Bourguesan (11)
378.	JS St Paul-lès-Romans (11)	1–3	AS St Barthélemy-de-Vals (12)
379.	AS Vallée du Doux (11)	4–2	RC Tournon-Tain (10)
380.	AS St Barthélemy-Grozon (11)	0–7	FC Châtelet (10)
381.	AS Roussas-Granges-Gontardes (11)	0–3	Olympique Centre Ardèche (10)
382.	EA Montvendre (11)	2–1	FR Allan (10)
383.	US Ancône (12)	3–4	ES Beaumonteleger (11)
384.	FC Hermitage (11)	1–2	ES Chomérac (10)
385.	US St Martin-de-Valamas (12)	1–3	FC Cheylarois (10)
386.	US Meysse (12)	0–3	US Lussas (12)
387.	CS Malataverne (12)	3–5	Olympique St Montanais (11)
388.	ES Vesseaux (11)	3–0	FC Viviers (12)
389.	Espérance Hostunoise (11)	3–0 (a.e.t.)	US Montélier (12)

== Second round ==
These matches were played between 26 August and 3 September 2017.

Second round results: Auvergne-Rhône-Alpes

Tie no	Home team (tier)	Score	Away team (tier)
1.	CS Bessay (9)	7–1	AL Quinssaines (10)
2.	FR Pouzy-Mésangy (10)	0–4	AS Cheminots St Germain (8)
3.	AS Nord Vignoble (8)	2–4 (a.e.t.)	SC Avermes (9)
4.	AS St Angel (11)	0–4	AS Val de Sioule (10)
5.	AS Dompierroise (9)	2–1	FC Souvigny (8)
6.	AS Toulonnaise (9)	2–1	US Vallon (9)
7.	FC Creuzier-le-Neuf (12)	3–6 (a.e.t.)	US Varennes-sur-Tèche (10)
8.	AS Billezois (10)	1–2	FC Billy-Crechy (8)
9.	AS Tronget (9)	0–2	AS Cérilly (9)
10.	US Marcillat-Pionsat (10)	0–1	FF Chappes (11)
11.	AC Creuzier-le-Vieux (8)	4–0	Commentry FC (8)
12.	Etoile Moulins Yzeure (10)	0–3	Stade St Yorre (9)
13.	AS Châtel-de-Neuvre (10)	2–2 (7–6 p)	AS Louchy (9)
14.	AS Gennetinoise (9)	0–1	FC Haut d'Allier (9)
15.	ES St Étienne-de-Vicq/Bost (11)	5–0	ES Diou (10)
16.	Bézenet-Doyet Foot (8)	1–0	US Lignerolles-Lavault Ste Anne (9)
17.	ES St Plaisir (12)	0–6	US Bien-Assis Montluçon (10)
18.	ES Vernetoise (8)	5–3	AS Varennes-sur-Allier (8)
19.	JS Neuvy (10)	10–1	CS Vaux-Estivareilles (11)
20.	AS Pléaux-Rilhac-Barriac (11)	0–4	FC des Quatre Vallées (9)
21.	ES Vebret-Ydes (11)	0–2	FC Albepierre-Bredons (12)
22.	Saignes FC (11)	2–2 (3–2 p)	AS Ayrens/St Illide (9)
23.	FC Hauts de Cère (12)	0–2	Cère FC Vic/Polminhac (9)
24.	US Murat (8)	2–4	FC Artense (9)
25.	US Besse (11)	0–1	AS Sansacoise (8)
26.	FC Massiac-Molompize-Blesle (8)	2–0	US Crandelles (9)
27.	ES Riomois-Condat (8)	5–3 (a.e.t.)	AS Yolet (9)
28.	La Combelle CAB (8)	void	Winner Round 1 tie 39
29.	AS St Didier-St Just (8)	1–0	AS Emblavez-Vorey (8)
30.	AS Villettoise (10)	2–1	FC St Germain Laprade (9)
31.	US Landos (11)	0–2	Sauveteurs Brivois (8)
32.	SC Langogne (8)	1–3	US Sucs et Lignon (8)
33.	US Bassoise (9)	3–2	AS Loudes (9)
34.	FC Aurec (9)	3–3 (4–1 p)	AG Sigolenoise (10)
35.	CO Craponne (10)	3–1	AS Beaulieu (10)
36.	Retournac Sportif (9)	3–2	AS Grazac-Lapte (8)
37.	US Les Martres-de-Veyre (8)	4–1	Dômes-Sancy Foot (9)
38.	Clermont Métropole FC (9)	4–0	US Orcet (10)
39.	Espérance Ceyratois Football (8)	6–0	CSA Brassacois Florinois (9)
40.	CS St Bonnet-près-Riom (9)	2–1	US Gerzat (10)
41.	FC Châtel-Guyon (8)	1–1 (2–4 p)	EFC St Amant-Tallende (8)
42.	Ecureuils Franc Rosier (10)	3–1	US Val de Couze Chambon (10)
43.	FC Nord Combraille (9)	2–1	RC Luzillat (10)
44.	RC Charbonnières-Paugnat (10)	1–3	JS St Priest-des-Champs (8)
45.	FC Aubierois (10)	1–2	US Issoire (8)
46.	CO Veyre-Monton (9)	1–4	Aulnat Sportif (8)
47.	FC Mirefleurs (11)	1–2	FC Mézel (10)
48.	ES St Germinoise (9)	4–1	AI St Babel (8)
49.	US Courpière (9)	5–4	AGuiRA FC (10)
50.	AS Royat (10)	1–7	AS Romagnat (8)
51.	AS Orcines (11)	2–4 (a.e.t.)	AS Livradois Sud (9)
52.	AS St Genès-Champanelle (8)	0–2	US Vic-le-Comte (8)
53.	AS Job (11)	1–2	US Maringues (8)
54.	FC Dunières (9)	2–4	ES Veauche (8)
55.	AS Attignat (11)	2–4	UGA Lyon-Décines (8)
56.	US L'Horme (12)	1–3	GS Dervaux Chambon-Feugerolles (8)
57.	AS Paremlan Villaz (11)	1–4	FC Cruseilles (8)
58.	FC Bourg-lès-Valence (10)	0–2	Olympique St Marcellin (8)
59.	US Replonges (10)	1–8	Olympique Belleroche Villefranche (8)
60.	CS Viriat (8)	1–0	Oyonnax Plastics Vallée FC (8)
61.	Entente Val d'Hyères (9)	0–2	US La Ravoire (10)
62.	AS Ugine (9)	1–2	FC St Baldoph (10)
63.	FC Bauges (13)	1–4	FC Belle Étoile Mercury (9)
64.	CA Maurienne (9)	4–0	AS Cuines-La Chambre Val d'Arc (10)
65.	USC Aiguebelle (12)	3–4	US Chartreuse Guiers (10)
66.	AS La Bridoire (11)	0–4	AS Brison-St Innocent (12)
67.	ES Bourget-du-Lac (10)	0–1	US Pontoise (9)
68.	FC Haute Tarentaise (9)	1–1 (4–5 p)	JS Chambéry (8)
69.	US Motteraine (8)	1–0	Nivolet FC (8)
70.	Cognin Sports (8)	2–1	Concordia FC Bellegarde (9)
71.	FC Curtafond-Confrançon-St Martin-St Didier (11)	0–4	FC Dombes-Bresse (8)
72.	AS Hautecourt-Romanèche (11)	4–1	AS St Étienne-sur-Reyssouze (11)
73.	ES Revermontoise (10)	1–3	CS Lagnieu (8)
74.	US Veyziat (10)	0–1	AS Montréal-la-Cluse (8)
75.	US Vonnas (11)	5–3 (a.e.t.)	AS Chaveyriat-Chanoz (11)
76.	US Dombes-Chalamont (11)	2–1	ES Cormoranche (10)
77.	Olympique Buyatin (12)	4–3	CSJ Châtillonnaise (11)
78.	US Izernore (11)	2–1 (a.e.t.)	FC Bords de l'Ain (10)
79.	St Denis-Ambutrix FC (11)	1–2	FC de la Plaine de l'Ain (12)
80.	FC Dombes (11)	5–0	FC Priay (12)
81.	CS Chevroux (12)	2–6	FC La Vallière (10)
82.	CS Belley (10)	0–2	US Feillens (8)
83.	US Tenay (11)	1–7	US Nantua (9)
84.	AS Guéreins-Genouilleux (12)	1–4	ES Foissiat-Étrez (9)
85.	FC Bressans (8)	1–2	FO Bourg (9)
86.	FC Bilieu (11)	1–2	CS Four (11)
87.	Jassans-Frans Foot (11)	7–0	AS Genay (11)
88.	FC Gavot (12)	1–0	ES Viry (12)
89.	US Argonay (10)	3–2	US Le Châble-Beaumont (11)
90.	Haut Giffre FC (10)	4–6	ES Valleiry (10)
91.	FC Semine (12)	3–3 (0–3 p)	FC Cessy-Gex (12)
92.	FC Cranves-Sales (12)	2–2 (4–2 p)	CSA Poisy (11)
93.	FC Foron (10)	3–0	ES Cernex (10)
94.	ES St Jeoire-La Tour (10)	1–2	ES Fillinges (10)
95.	CO Chavanod (10)	2–3 (a.e.t.)	FC Ballaison (9)
96.	FC Les Houches-Servoz (12)	2–0	SC Morzine Vallée d'Aulps (11)
97.	UC Turque Thonon-les-Bains (12)	2–2 (5–4 p)	AS Le Lyaud-Armoy (11)
98.	US Annemasse-Gaillard (8)	2–1	FC Cluses (9)
99.	FC Évian (13)	1–3 (a.e.t.)	AS St Genis-Ferney-Crozet (9)
100.	SS Allinges (9)	1–0 (a.e.t.)	FJ Ambilly (9)
101.	ES Chilly (9)	5–1	ES Thyez (9)
102.	FC Chéran (9)	1–2	US Annecy-le-Vieux (8)
103.	Olympique Cran (9)	0–1	FCS Rumilly Albanais (8)
104.	FC La Filière (11)	0–2	ES Amancy (8)
105.	US Mont Blanc (9)	1–0	ES Seynod (8)
106.	Olympique Villefontaine (12)	1–2	US Divonne (8)
107.	FC des Collines (11)	5–3	US Ruy-Montceau (11)
108.	FC Liers (12)	0–4	Deux Rochers FC (10)
109.	FC Vallée Bleue (13)	3–1	AS St Lattier (12)
110.	US Beaurepairoise (11)	1–1 (3–4 p)	Olympique Les Avenières (12)
111.	FC Crolles-Bernin (11)	2–7	Olympique Nord Dauphiné (8)
112.	AS Vézeronce-Huert (11)	1–4	AS Domarin (10)
113.	AS Portugaise Bourgoin-Jallieu (10)	1–3	OC Eybens (8)
114.	Moirans FC (14)	0–1	ES Rachais (8)
115.	Formafoot Bièvre Valloire (11)	1–3	US La Murette (10)
116.	AS Susville-Matheysine (13)	0–2	US Sassenage (9)
117.	US Reventin (11)	5–3	Isle d'Abeau FC (9)
118.	Champagnier FC (12)	1–5	AS Italienne Européenne Grenoble (10)
119.	EF des Étangs (10)	0–3	FC Voiron-Moirans (11)
120.	FC St Martin d'Uriage (12)	0–3	AS Ver Sau (9)
121.	AS Martinerois (10)	0–2	ES Manival (8)
122.	AS Grésivaudan (11)	3–2	FC Seyssins (10)
123.	US Creys-Morestel (9)	0–3	FC Varèze (8)
124.	FC Commelle-Vernay (9)	2–4	FC Roanne Clermont (9)
125.	AS Chambéon-Magneux (9)	5–0	Roanne Matel SFC (10)
126.	FC St Étienne (10)	0–1	SC Grand-Croix/Lorette (8)
127.	US Sud Forézienne (10)	0–4	US Villars (8)
128.	ES Champdieu-Marcilly (9)	1–2	US St Galmier-Chambœuf (9)
129.	JS Cellieu (10)	1–1 (2–4 p)	FCO Firminy-Insersport (8)
130.	AS Ouest Roannais (11)	0–3	ACL Mably (11)
131.	ES Sorbiers (10)	1–0	AC Rive-de-Gier (9)
132.	OC Ondaine (10)	1–2	US Metare St Étienne Sud-Est (9)
133.	CO La Rivière (10)	0–4	L'Étrat-La Tour Sportif (8)
134.	Olympique St Étienne (13)	2–1	AS Aveizieux (11)
135.	Bellegarde Sports (11)	5–1	FC St Cyr-de-Favières-l'Hôpital (11)
136.	ES Haut Forez (11)	1–1 (5–4 p)	AS Noirétable (11)
137.	AS St Cyr-les-Vignes (11)	5–1	AS St Martinoise (10)
138.	Roanne AS Parc du Sport (10)	5–1	FC Montrambert Ricamar (11)
139.	FC St Paul-en-Jarez (10)	8–1	AS Finerbal (11)
140.	AF Pays de Coise (11)	2–2 (5–4 p)	St Étienne UC Terrenoire (11)
141.	AS Jonzieux (10)	2–3	Olympique du Montcel (11)
142.	Sury SC (12)	6–2	US Briennon (11)
143.	US Renaisonnaise Apchonnaise (11)	3–1	AS St Haon-le-Vieux (12)
144.	ES St Christo-Marcenod (11)	4–0	Olympique Est Roannais (12)
145.	AS Portugaise Vaulx-en-Velin (11)	3–4	ES Genas Azieu (10)
146.	Muroise Foot (11)	1–0	FC Point du Jour (11)
147.	Rhône Sud FC (12)	2–4	JSO Givors (11)
148.	Olympiqe St Quentinois (10)	2–1	AS Manissieux (9)
149.	AS Algerienne Villeurbanne (10)	3–0	JS Irigny (10)
150.	FC Rive Droite (10)	3–1	FC St Cyr Collonges au Mont d'Or (10)
151.	USF Tarare (12)	4–1	Haute Brévenne Foot (9)
152.	Olympique Vaulx-en-Venlin (10)	1–4	AS Buers Villeurbanne (10)
153.	FC Ste Foy-lès-Lyon (10)	2–3	AS St Forgeux (10)
154.	FC Franchevilloise (12)	2–4	CO St Fons (9)
155.	FC Anthon (12)	0–5	US Vaulx-en-Velin (9)
156.	AS Villefontaine (10)	4–3	FC Chaponnay-Marennes (8)
157.	ES Chaponost (11)	3–0	CS Meginand (8)
158.	AS St Martin-en-Haut (10)	0–2	Sud Lyonnais Foot (8)
159.	Latino AFC Lyon (12)	1–3	US Cheminots Lyon Vaise (10)
160.	US Des Monts (11)	1–5	FC Pays de l'Arbresle (10)
161.	US Millery-Vourles (8)	1–3	FC Val Lyonnais (8)
162.	AS Rhodanienne (10)	0–4	US Meyzieu (8)
163.	FC Gerland (11)	2–1	UO Tassin-la-Demi-Lune (11)
164.	FC Corbas (9)	5–2	ES Charly Foot (10)
165.	Beaujolais Football (10)	2–4 (a.e.t.)	Entente Odenas-Charentay-St Lager (10)
166.	Stade Amplepuisien (10)	3–1	ES Lamurien (9)
167.	SO Pont-de-Chéruy-Chavanoz (9)	1–0	FC Pontcharra-St Loup (9)
168.	AS Denicé (11)	0–1	US Beaujolais Vauxonne (11)
169.	AS Craponne (9)	2–3	ES Trinité Lyon (9)
170.	US Est Lyonnais (9)	1–4	FC Annonay (8)
171.	ES Nord Drôme (11)	0–7	FC Chabeuil (9)
172.	ASL Génissieux (11)	0–2	Vallis Auréa Foot (10)
173.	FC Valdaine (8)	1–1 (5–4 p)	Olympique Ruomsois (8)
174.	Olympique Rhodia (8)	1–1 (4–2 p)	Entente Crest-Aouste (8)
175.	AS Dolon (10)	1–6	FC Péageois (8)
176.	FC Montmiral-Parnans (12)	1–4	AS Donatienne (8)
177.	CO Donzère (12)	2–7	FC Montélimar (10)
178.	FC Félines-St Cyr-Peaugres (11)	0–0 (4–3 p)	Vivar SC Soyons (11)
179.	Borussia Valence FC (13)	0–3	FC Rambertois (11)
180.	FC Pays de Bourdeaux (13)	2–1	JS St Privat (11)
181.	FC Hauterives/US Grand-Serre (12)	1–3	US Davézieux-Vidalon (11)
182.	PS Romanaise (11)	1–0	AS Homenetmen Bourg-lès Valence (11)
183.	FC St Restitut (13)	4–2	FC Aubenas (12)
184.	ES Malissardoise (12)	2–1	AS Vanséenne (12)
185.	RC Mauves (10)	3–0	US Vallée du Jabron (10)
186.	US Croix du Fraysse (11)	1–4	Football Mont-Pilat (9)
187.	FC Goubetois (11)	2–5 (a.e.t.)	JS Allexoise (11)
188.	FC Serrières-Sablons (10)	1–2	CO Châteauneuvois (11)
189.	AS Vallée du Doux (11)	3–0	FC Cheylarois (10)
190.	US St Gervais-sur-Roubion (12)	3–4	FC Châtelet (10)
191.	FC Alboussière (12)	0–3	Rhône Crussol Foot 07 (10)
192.	Diois FC (13)	0–1	ES Beaumonteleger (11)
193.	CS Châteauneuf-de-Galaure (12)	0–4	FC 540 (11)
194.	US Vals-les-Bains (11)	2–2 (5–4 p)	Olympique Centre Ardèche (10)
195.	SC Bourguesan (11)	1–0	ES Vesseaux (11)
196.	AS St Barthélemy-de-Vals (12)	2–1	ES Chomérac (10)
197.	Espérance Hostunoise (11)	6–1	EA Montvendre (11)
198.	US Lussas (12)	2–1	Olympique St Montanais (11)
199.	FC Franc Lyonnais (11)	1–3	Feyzin Club Belle Étoile (9)

== Third round ==
These matches were played on 7 and 8 October 2017.

Fifth round results: Auvergne-Rhône-Alpes

Tie no	Home team (tier)	Score	Away team (tier)
1.	GS Dervaux Chambon-Feugerolles (8)	0–3	ASF Andrézieux (4)
2.	FC Roche-St Genest (7)	1–1 (2–3 p)	FCO Firminy-Insersport (8)
3.	AS Saint-Priest (4)	4–2	Chambéry SF (5)
4.	ES Bressane Marboz (6)	0–2	Annecy FC (4)
5.	ES Tarentaise (7)	2–1	FC Bourgoin-Jallieu (5)
6.	FC Bords de Saône (7)	3–2	FC Limonest Saint-Didier (5)
7.	FC Rhône Vallées (6)	1–2 (a.e.t.)	FC Villefranche (4)
8.	AS Italienne Européenne Grenoble (10)	0–1	SA Thiers (5)
9.	FC Montélimar (10)	1–4	AS Sud Ardèche (7)
10.	FC Échirolles (6)	2–0	Football Côte St André (7)
11.	US St Georges / Les Ancizes (6)	1–4	FC Espaly (6)
12.	Roannais Foot 42 (7)	0–3 (a.e.t.)	AS Lyon-Duchère (3)
13.	FCS Rumilly Albanais (8)	2–1	FC Cruseilles (8)
14.	FC Valdaine (8)	1–1 (4–1 p)	Côte Chaude Sportif (6)
15.	Olympique Nord Dauphiné (8)	0–0 (3–4 p)	Hauts Lyonnais (6)
16.	Football Mont-Pilat (9)	3–1	Domtac FC (7)
17.	FC Veyle Sâone (7)	0–2	ES Vallières (6)
18.	US Argonay (10)	2–9	Cluses-Scionzier FC (6)
19.	US Nantua (9)	0–1	AC Seyssinet (7)
20.	FC Charvieu-Chavagneux (7)	2–4 (a.e.t.)	FC Vaulx-en-Velin (5)
21.	AS Domarin (10)	2–3	US Divonne (8)
22.	FC La Tour-St Clair (7)	6–0	US Annemasse-Gaillard (8)
23.	FC Vallée de la Gresse (7)	2–1	JS Chambéry (8)
24.	FC Foron (10)	5–3 (a.e.t.)	FC Salaise (6)
25.	AS Chambéon-Magneux (9)	0–1	AS Bron Grand Lyon (7)
26.	Roanne AS Parc du Sport (10)	1–3	Monts d'Or Azergues Foot (4)
27.	AS Algérienne Chambon-Feugerolles (7)	5–0	AA Lapalisse (7)
28.	SC Avermes (9)	0–3	FC Aurillac Arpajon Cantal Auvergne (5)
29.	Ytrac Foot (5)	2–0	RC Vichy (6)
30.	AS Cheminots St Germain (8)	2–0	CS Pont-du-Château (7)
31.	US Brioude (7)	1–3	FC Chamalières (5)
32.	FA Le Cendre (7)	1–3	Le Puy Foot 43 Auvergne (4)
33.	US Vic-le-Comte (8)	0–1	Espérance Ceyratois Football (8)
34.	Montluçon Football (5)	0–4	AS Yzeure (4)
35.	Velay FC (6)	4–3	FC Cournon-d'Auvergne (6)
36.	US Reventin (11)	2–3	AS Chavanay (7)
37.	MOS Trois Rivières (7)	3–3 (2–3 p)	US Feurs (7)
38.	ES Valleiry (10)	0–15	Grenoble Foot 38 (3)

== Fourth round ==
These matches were played on 23 and 24 September 2017.

Fourth round results: Auvergne-Rhône-Alpes

Tie no	Home team (tier)	Score	Away team (tier)
1.	US Blavozy (6)	0–4	FC Chamalières (5)
2.	AS Montréal-la-Cluse (8)	0–1	FC Échirolles (6)
3.	Olympique de Valence (7)	1–3	Monts d'Or Azergues Foot (4)
4.	US Beaumontoise (7)	0–1	FC Aurillac Arpajon Cantal Auvergne (5)
5.	CS Volvic (5)	0–0 (1–3 p)	AS Yzeure (4)
6.	FC Cournon-d'Auvergne (6)	1–0 (a.e.t.)	AS St Jacques (7)
7.	Jassans-Frans Foot (11)	0–1	FCS Rumilly Albanais (8)
8.	SC Cruas (6)	2–4	AS Bron Grand Lyon (7)
9.	FC Corbas (9)	0–3	Chambéry SF (5)
10.	UMS Montélimar (6)	1–2 (a.e.t.)	FC Vaulx-en-Velin (5)
11.	US Feurs (7)	1–1 (4–2 p)	L'Étrat-La Tour Sportif (8)
12.	Cluses-Scionzier FC (6)	4–2	Ain Sud Foot (5)
13.	US Annemasse-Gaillard (8)	5–2	Ambérieu FC (7)
14.	FCO Firminy-Insersport (8)	4–0	SC St Pourcain (7)
15.	FC Roche-St Genest (7)	0–0 (4–3 p)	Olympique St Marcellin (8)
16.	ES Riomois-Condat (8)	3–4	FA Le Cendre (7)
17.	CS Pont-du-Château (7)	3–0	Bézenet-Doyet Foot (8)
18.	US Issoire (8)	2–3	Velay FC (6)
19.	RC Vichy (6)	2–0	US Monistrol (7)
20.	CS Viriat (8)	1–2	FC La Tour-St Clair (7)
21.	AS Sud Ardèche (7)	6–0	FC Varèze (8)
22.	AA Lapalisse (7)	1–0 (a.e.t.)	FCUS Ambert (7)
23.	US Brioude (7)	2–0	Sauveteurs Brivois (8)
24.	CS St Bonnet-près-Riom (9)	0–0 (0–3 p)	US Vic-le-Comte (8)
25.	FC Espaly (6)	7–0	Entente Nord Lozère (7)
26.	FC St Paul-en-Jarez (10)	0–2	AS Cheminots St Germain (8)
27.	US Les Martres-de-Veyre (8)	0–7	Le Puy Foot 43 Auvergne (4)
28.	Espérance Ceyratois Football (8)	4–1	FC Ally Mauriac (7)
29.	CO Craponne (10)	1–2	US St Georges / Les Ancizes (6)
30.	JS Neuvy (10)	1–3	SC Avermes (9)
31.	GS Dervaux Chambon-Feugerolles (8)	4–2	AS Moulins Foot (6)
32.	FC Haut d'Allier (9)	5–7	Roanne AS Parc du Sport (10)
33.	FC Aurec (9)	0–9	ASF Andrézieux (4)
34.	US Renaisonnaise Apchonnaise (11)	0–2	Montluçon Football (5)
35.	La Combelle CAB (8)	1–4	Ytrac Foot (5)
36.	US Pontoise (9)	0–4	Annecy FC (4)
37.	AS Italienne Européenne Grenoble (10)	3–2 (a.e.t.)	FC St Baldoph (10)
38.	Muroise Foot (11)	1–9	FC Charvieu-Chavagneux (7)
39.	US Argonay (10)	3–2	CS Amphion Publier (7)
40.	AS Hautecourt-Romanèche (11)	1–4	US Divonne (8)
41.	AS Cérilly (9)	0–10	Roannais Foot 42 (7)
42.	US Vonnas (11)	1–4	ES Tarentaise (7)
43.	FC Foron (10)	4–2	Chassieu Décines FC (7)
44.	Vallée du Guiers FC (7)	1–2	FC Cruseilles (8)
45.	JS Chambéry (8)	1–0 (a.e.t.)	FC Ballaison (9)
46.	FC La Vallière (10)	1–3	US Nantua (9)
47.	US La Ravoire (10)	1–2 (a.e.t.)	FC Veyle Sâone (7)
48.	UF Belleville St Jean-d'Ardières (7)	1–3	ES Vallières (6)
49.	JS Allexoise (11)	0–5	FC Rhône Vallées (6)
50.	FC Pays de l'Arbresle (10)	0–7	Hauts Lyonnais (6)
51.	Bellegarde Sports (11)	0–1	AC Seyssinet (7)
52.	ES Trinité Lyon (9)	0–2 (Note: Match was abandoned by the referee at half time. ES Trinité Lyon were subsequently disciplined and the tie was awarded to Côte Chaude Sportif.)	Côte Chaude Sportif (6)
53.	ES Rachais (8)	1–2	Football Mont-Pilat (9)
54.	Domtac FC (7)	3–1 (a.e.t.)	St Chamond Foot (7)
55.	Football Côte St André (7)	3–1	FC Lyon (7)
56.	US St Galmier-Chambœuf (9)	3–4	SA Thiers (5)
57.	AS Ver Sau (9)	0–2	AS Saint-Priest (4)
58.	US Meyzieu (8)	0–3	Olympique Nord Dauphiné (8)
59.	US Metare St Étienne Sud-Est (9)	1–7	AS Algérienne Chambon-Feugerolles (7)
60.	Olympique du Montcel (11)	0–9	FC Bords de Saône (7)
61.	ES Valleiry (10)	3–2 (a.e.t.)	CS Four (11)
62.	JSO Givors (11)	1–3	FC Salaise (6)
63.	AS Domarin (10)	1–0	FC Annonay (8)
64.	US La Murette (10)	1–4	MOS Trois Rivières (7)
65.	US Reventin (11)	4–1 (a.e.t.)	ES Beaumonteleger (11)
66.	FC Chabeuil (9)	0–1	FC Vallée de la Gresse (7)
67.	Rhône Crussol Foot 07 (10)	1–2	FC Bourgoin-Jallieu (5)
68.	FC Rambertois (11)	1–3	FC Valdaine (8)
69.	Olympique Rhodia (8)	2–4	AS Chavanay (7)
70.	ES Chaponost (11)	1–3	AS Chambéon-Magneux (9)
71.	SS Allinges (9)	0–4	ES Bressane Marboz (6)
72.	FC Montélimar (10)	2–1	US Davézieux-Vidalon (11)
73.	ES Genas Azieu (10)	0–2	FC Villefranche (4)
74.	AS Misérieux-Trévoux (7)	0–0 (2–4 p)	FC Limonest Saint-Didier (5)

== Fifth round ==
These matches were played on 7 and 8 October 2017.

Fifth round results: Auvergne-Rhône-Alpes

Tie no	Home team (tier)	Score	Away team (tier)
1.	GS Dervaux Chambon-Feugerolles (8)	0–3	ASF Andrézieux (4)
2.	FC Roche-St Genest (7)	1–1 (2–3 p)	FCO Firminy-Insersport (8)
3.	AS Saint-Priest (4)	4–2	Chambéry SF (5)
4.	ES Bressane Marboz (6)	0–2	Annecy FC (4)
5.	ES Tarentaise (7)	2–1	FC Bourgoin-Jallieu (5)
6.	FC Bords de Saône (7)	3–2	FC Limonest Saint-Didier (5)
7.	FC Rhône Vallées (6)	1–2 (a.e.t.)	FC Villefranche (4)
8.	AS Italienne Européenne Grenoble (10)	0–1	SA Thiers (5)
9.	FC Montélimar (10)	1–4	AS Sud Ardèche (7)
10.	FC Échirolles (6)	2–0	Football Côte St André (7)
11.	US St Georges / Les Ancizes (6)	1–4	FC Espaly (6)
12.	Roannais Foot 42 (7)	0–3 (a.e.t.)	AS Lyon-Duchère (3)
13.	FCS Rumilly Albanais (8)	2–1	FC Cruseilles (8)
14.	FC Valdaine (8)	1–1 (4–1 p)	Côte Chaude Sportif (6)
15.	Olympique Nord Dauphiné (8)	0–0 (3–4 p)	Hauts Lyonnais (6)
16.	Football Mont-Pilat (9)	3–1	Domtac FC (7)
17.	FC Veyle Sâone (7)	0–2	ES Vallières (6)
18.	US Argonay (10)	2–9	Cluses-Scionzier FC (6)
19.	US Nantua (9)	0–1	AC Seyssinet (7)
20.	FC Charvieu-Chavagneux (7)	2–4 (a.e.t.)	FC Vaulx-en-Velin (5)
21.	AS Domarin (10)	2–3	US Divonne (8)
22.	FC La Tour-St Clair (7)	6–0	US Annemasse-Gaillard (8)
23.	FC Vallée de la Gresse (7)	2–1	JS Chambéry (8)
24.	FC Foron (10)	5–3 (a.e.t.)	FC Salaise (6)
25.	AS Chambéon-Magneux (9)	0–1	AS Bron Grand Lyon (7)
26.	Roanne AS Parc du Sport (10)	1–3	Monts d'Or Azergues Foot (4)
27.	AS Algérienne Chambon-Feugerolles (7)	5–0	AA Lapalisse (7)
28.	SC Avermes (9)	0–3	FC Aurillac Arpajon Cantal Auvergne (5)
29.	Ytrac Foot (5)	2–0	RC Vichy (6)
30.	AS Cheminots St Germain (8)	2–0	CS Pont-du-Château (7)
31.	US Brioude (7)	1–3	FC Chamalières (5)
32.	FA Le Cendre (7)	1–3	Le Puy Foot 43 Auvergne (4)
33.	US Vic-le-Comte (8)	0–1	Espérance Ceyratois Football (8)
34.	Montluçon Football (5)	0–4	AS Yzeure (4)
35.	Velay FC (6)	4–3	FC Cournon-d'Auvergne (6)
36.	US Reventin (11)	2–3	AS Chavanay (7)
37.	MOS Trois Rivières (7)	3–3 (2–3 p)	US Feurs (7)
38.	ES Valleiry (10)	0–15	Grenoble Foot 38 (3)

== Sixth round ==
These matches were played on 21 and 22 October 2017.

Sixth round results: Auvergne-Rhône-Alpes

Tie no	Home team (tier)	Score	Away team (tier)
1.	FCO Firminy-Insersport (8)	0–1	AS Lyon-Duchère (3)
2.	Cluses-Scionzier FC (6)	4–3	AS Saint-Priest (4)
3.	AS Bron Grand Lyon (7)	5–1	FCS Rumilly Albanais (8)
4.	FC Échirolles (6)	1–3	FC Villefranche (4)
5.	Annecy FC (4)	4–3 (a.e.t.)	FC Vaulx-en-Velin (5)
6.	AS Sud Ardèche (7)	2–1	AS Chavanay (7)
7.	FC Chamalières (5)	2–0 (a.e.t.)	FC Espaly (6)
8.	US Feurs (7)	1–0	FC Aurillac Arpajon Cantal Auvergne (5)
9.	ES Tarentaise (7)	1–0	FC Bords de Saône (7)
10.	AS Cheminots St Germain (8)	0–3	AS Yzeure (4)
11.	AC Seyssinet (7)	3–1	SA Thiers (5)
12.	Hauts Lyonnais (6)	3–0	Ytrac Foot (5)
13.	Espérance Ceyratois Football (8)	0–7	ASF Andrézieux (4)
14.	Football Mont-Pilat (9)	3–1	AS Algérienne Chambon-Feugerolles (7)
15.	Velay FC (6)	0–2	Le Puy Foot 43 Auvergne (4)
16.	FC Valdaine (8)	1–0	ES Vallières (6)
17.	FC Foron (10)	1–4	FC La Tour-St Clair (7)
18.	US Divonne (8)	0–1	FC Vallée de la Gresse (7)
19.	Monts d'Or Azergues Foot (4)	0–1	Grenoble Foot 38 (3)
