= FC Échirolles =

French football club

- Full name: Football Club d'Échirolles
- Founded: 1949
- Ground: Stade Eugène Thénard
- Capacity: 2,000
- Chairman: Max Riondet
- Manager: Teddy Palermo
- League: Ligue Auvergne-Rhône-Alpes, Regional 2 Pool D
- 2025–26: 4th
- Website: https://www.facebook.com/footballechirolles
Home colours	Away colours

Football Club d'Échirolles is a French association football club founded in 1949. They are based in Échirolles, near Grenoble in Isère, France and are currently playing in the Ligue Auvergne-Rhône-Alpes, the 6th tier of French football. They play at the Stade Eugène Thénard in Échirolles.

FC Échirolles has reached the 7th round of the Coupe de France on several occasions, most notably suffering a 4–1 defeat to Olympique de Marseille in the 1995–96 edition.

== Honours ==
- Championnat de DH Rhône-Alpes: 2000-01, 2004–05, 2010–11
- Coupe Rhône-Alpes: 2004-05
