= Velay FC =

Football club based in Haute-Loire, France

Velay
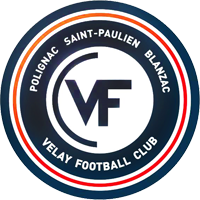
- Full name: Velay Football Club
- Founded: 2016
- Stadium: Stade Victor Reignier
- Capacity: 1,000
- League: Régional 1 Auvergne-Rhône-Alpes
- 2021–22: National 3 Group M, 12th (relegated)
- Website: https://velayfootballclub.com/

Velay Football Club is a football club based in the communes of Blanzac, Polignac, and Saint-Paulien in the Haute-Loire department of France. As of the 2022–23 season, it competes in the sixth tier of the French football league system.

== History ==
In 2016, AS Polignac merged with Saint-Paulien Blanzac FC to create Velay FC. In 2020, the club achieved promotion to the Championnat National 3 for the first time in its history.
