= SA Thiers =

French football club

Thiers
- Full name: Sports Athlétiques Thiernois Football
- Founded: 1935; 91 years ago
- Ground: Parc des Sports Antonin Chastel, Thiers, Puy-de-Dôme
- Chairman: Jean-Pierre Del Pino
- Manager: François Combronde
- League: Régional 1 Auvergne-Rhône-Alpes
- 2019–20: National 3 Group M, 13th (relegated)
- Website: https://www.sat-football.com
Home colours

Sports Athlétiques Thiernois Football is a French association football club founded in 1935. They are based in the town of Thiers, Puy-de-Dôme and their home stadium is the Parc des Sports Antonin Chastel. The first team was relegated from 2019–20 Championnat National 3 and now play in Régional 1, the sixth tier of the French football league system.
