= RC Vichy =

French football club

- Full name: Racing Club Vichy Football
- Founded: 1945
- Ground: Stade Louis Darragon; Vichy, Auvergne
- Capacity: 4,900
- Chairman: Jean-Jacques Pacheco
- Manager: Emmanuel Desgeorges
- League: Auvergne Division d’Honneur
- 2007-08: Auvergne Division d’Honneur
Home colours

The Racing Club Vichy Football is a French association football club founded in 1945. They are based in Vichy, Auvergne and are currently playing in the Auvergne Division d’Honneur, the sixth tier in the French football league system. They play at the Stade Louis Darragon, which has a capacity of 4,900.

== History ==
Racing Club Vichy Football was originally formed under the club Racing Club Omnisport de Vichy. In 1945, after merging with three other Vichy-based clubs, the current club that exists today came into existence. RC Vichy has, over their league history, primarily played in the Auvergne Division d’Honneur. They did achieve promotion to the CFA 2 in 1999, but only lasted a season before being relegated back to the Division d’Honneur, where they currently remain as of today.

== Honours ==
- Auvergne Division d’Honneur:
  - Champions: 1999, 1981, 1961, 1948
