= FC Cournon-d'Auvergne =

French football club

Cournon-d'Auvergne
- Full name: Football Club de Cournon d'Auvergne
- Founded: 1919
- Ground: Stade Joseph Gardet, Cournon-d'Auvergne
- Capacity: 437
- Chairman: Baptiste Gamez
- Manager: Guy Lemasson
- League: Regional 1 Auvergne-Rhône-Alpes
- 2016-17: CFA 2 Group F, 14th (relegated)
Home colours

Football Club de Cournon-d'Auvergne is a French association football club founded in 1919. They are based in the town of Cournon-d'Auvergne and their home stadium is the Stade Joseph Gardet, which has a capacity of 437 spectators. As of the 2017–18 season, they play in the Regional 1 Auvergne-Rhône-Alpes.
