= 2010–11 Coupe de France =

The Coupe Charles Simon

Tournament details
- Country: France
- Teams: 7,449

Final positions
- Champions: Lille
- Runners-up: Paris Saint-Germain

Tournament statistics
- Top goal scorer(s): Guillaume Hoarau (7 goals)

The 2010–11 Coupe de France was the 94th season of France's most prestigious cup competition. The competition was organized by the French Football Federation (FFF) and was open to all clubs in French football, as well as clubs from the overseas departments and territories (Guadeloupe, French Guiana, Martinique, Mayotte, New Caledonia, French Polynesia and Réunion). The final was contested on 14 May 2011 at the Stade de France. The defending champions were Paris Saint-Germain, who defeated Monaco 1–0 in the final of the 2009–10 edition. The winner of the competition will qualify for the 2011–12 UEFA Europa League and will be inserted into the Playoff round.

The competition officially began on 11 August 2010 with the start of the first round beginning play in the Alsace region (most regions began play the following weekend), however, qualification matches for the tournament had been in commencement since January 2010 with overseas regions and collectivities such as New Caledonia having its national cup competition served as a qualifying tournament for the Coupe de France. On 2 March 2011, the last amateur club in the competition, Chambéry, who are currently playing in the Championnat de France amateur 2, the fifth level of French football, were eliminated after losing 3–0 to Ligue 2 club Angers in the quarterfinals. Chambéry's stint in the competition was notable due in part to the club being the first amateur club in Coupe de France history to defeat three Ligue 1 clubs. On 15 April, Chambéry were awarded the Petit Poucet Plaque, an award given to the best performing amateur club in the Coupe de France.

On 14 May 2011, first division club Lille defeated the defending champions Paris Saint-Germain 1–0 in the 2011 Coupe de France Final courtesy of a late second half goal from Ludovic Obraniak to win the Coupe de France title. The title is the club's first domestically since winning the Coupe de France in over 56 years ago.

== Calendar ==
On 14 March 2010, the FFF announced the calendar for the 94th edition Coupe de France.

Round	First match date	Fixtures	Clubs	Notes
First Round	11 August 2010			
Second Round	28 August 2010			
Third Round	18 September 2010			Clubs participating in CFA 2 gain entry.
Fourth Round	2 October 2010			Clubs participating in the CFA gain entry.
Fifth Round	16 October 2010			Clubs participating in the Championnat National gain entry.
Sixth Round	30 October 2010	153	346 → 193	
Seventh Round	20 November 2010	86	193 → 107	Clubs participating in Ligue 2 gain entry.
Eighth Round	11 December 2010	43	107 → 64	
Round of 64	8 January 2011	32	64 → 32	Clubs participating in Ligue 1 gain entry.
Round of 32	22 January 2011	16	32 → 16	
Round of 16	1 February 2011	8	16 → 8	
Quarter-finals	1 March 2011	4	8 → 4	
Semi-finals	19 April 2011	2	4 → 2	
Final	14 May 2011	1	2 → 1	Coupe de France Final at the Stade de France.

== News ==
=== Record number of clubs ===
On 4 November 2010, the French Football Federation announced that, for the third consecutive season, over 7,000 clubs will have participated in the competition following its conclusion. A record 7,449 clubs applied for entrance to the 2010–11 edition, bypassing the previous record, 7,317 clubs, which was set last year.

=== New Caledonia's participant ===
The 2010 edition of the New Caledonia Cup, which served as a qualifying tournament for the Coupe de France began play in January 2010. The competition was resolved in August with Magenta defeating Gaïtcha 2–1 in the final. However, due to winning the league and cup double in New Caledonia, Magenta were forced by the Fédération Calédonienne de Football to cede its participation in the Coupe de France to Gaïtcha due to the former club's involvement in the 2010–11 OFC Champions League. Magenta responded to the decision by appealing to the Federation's Appeal Board. Despite this, the Coupe de France Commission still included Gaïtcha in its draw and, on 3 November, the club was drawn with Championnat de France amateur club USL Dunkerque. Five days later, Magenta's appeal was heard and the Federation ruled in favour of the club allowing Magenta re-entry into the tournament. Gaïtcha, whom Magenta replaced, expressed its disappointment and also announced its intent to appeal the ruling.

=== Tourcoing and Viry-Châtillon ruling ===
The seventh round match between Tourcoing and Viry-Châtillon was abandoned after 30 minutes following an altercation between two opposing players, which resulted in a brawl breaking out and dozens of spectators invading the field of play. The brawl led to a player losing consciousness and an assistant referee suffering a back injury after being hit with debris. The incident required police and firefighter intervention and, despite handing out four red cards as a result of the altercation, the referee called the match off after repeated failed attempts to restore calm.

On 3 December, the French Football Federation ruled that, due to the incidents that occurred in the match, both clubs would be disbarred from this year's competition, effective immediately. Both clubs will also be ineligible to appear in next year's competition, as well. ES Wasquehal, who were due to face either club in the eight round will be shifted directly to the Round of 32 due to the ruling.

== Regional qualifying rounds ==
All of the teams that enter the competition, but are not members of Ligue 1 or Ligue 2, have to compete in the regional qualifying rounds. The regional qualifying rounds determine the number of regional clubs that will earn spots in the 7th round and normally lasts six rounds.

== Seventh Round ==
The draw for the seventh round of Coupe de France was held on 3 November 2010 at the headquarters of the Comité National Olympique et Sportif Français (CNOSF) and was conducted by current US Quevilly manager Régis Brouard, Réginald Becque, a former football player who captained Calais to the 2000 Coupe de France Final, and former French internationals Lionel Charbonnier and Xavier Gravelaine. The overseas regional draw was conducted the previous day on 2 November by former international Laurent Robert and the president of the Coupe de France Commission Jean Djorkaeff. The matches were played on 19–21 November.

Tie no	Home team	Score	Away team
1	Illkirch Graffenstaden	5–3	Lunéville
2	Hayange	0–8	Dijon
3	Schiltigheim	1–1 (a.e.t); 5–4 pen.	Mulhouse
4	Colmar	2–3 (a.e.t)	Jarville
5	Forbach	1–1 (a.e.t); 4–3 pen.	Illzach Modenheim
6	Soucht	1–7	Strasbourg
7	Sierentz	1–3 (a.e.t)	Thaon-les-Vosges
8	Steinseltz	0–2	Sedan
9	Jura Sud	0–0 (a.e.t); 5–4 pen.	Andrézieux
10	Lons-le-Saunier	5–4 (a.e.t)	Marcy-l'Etoile
11	Istres	2–0	Bastia
12	Pont-de-Roide	2–2 (a.e.t); 4–2 pen.	Villefranche
13	Vénissieux	1–1 (a.e.t); 3–4 pen.	Firminy
14	Evian	4–2	Lyon Duchère
15	Semmoz Vieugy	1–0	Ain Sud
16	Chambéry	9–0	Fesches Le Châtel
17	Marignane	2–0	Furiani-Agliani
18	Grenoble	1–1 (a.e.t); 4–2 pen.	Bagnols Pont
19	Perpignan Canet	0–3	Fréjus Saint-Raphaël
20	Vaulx-en-Velin	3–1	Valence
21	Fabrègues	2–4	Cannes
22	Côte-Chaude	0–3	Ajaccio
23	Saint-Maurice l'Exil	1–5	Fos-sur-Mer
24	Seyssinet Pariset	1–1 (a.e.t); 3–1 pen.	Clermont-L'Hérault
25	Agen	2–1	Marmande
26	Nîmes	1–0	Rodez
27	Colomiers	1–0	Stade Bordelais
28	Villenave d'Ornon	0–2	Auch
29	Balma	0–1	Châteauroux
30	Challans	2–0 (a.e.t)	Bassin d'Arcachon
31	Agde	3–1	Revel
32	Aurillac	4–2	La Roche-sur-Yon
33	Montluçon	1–1 (a.e.t); 3–4 pen.	Angoulême
34	Royan	0–3	Clermont
35	Chauvigny	1–0 (a.e.t)	Jarnac
36	Créteil	3–1	Romorantin
37	Murat	1–6	Trélissac
38	Gueugnon	0–0 (a.e.t); 7–8 pen.	Yzeure
39	Cognac	2–1	Tours
40	Thiers	3–2 (a.e.t)	Cournon d'Auvergne

Tie no	Home team	Score	Away team
41	Sablé-sur-Sarthe	0–1	Montagnarde
42	Romagné	1–7	Nantes
43	Sannois Saint-Gratien	3–2 (a.e.t)	La Vitréenne
44	La Ferté-Bernard	0–4	Guingamp
45	Laval	2–1	Granville
46	Saint-André-des-Eaux	1–3	Vendée Fontenay
47	Changé	1–2	Bayeux
48	Cherbourg	5–0	Malesherbes
49	Vertou	0–0 (a.e.t); 3–1 pen.	Plabennec
50	Saint-Renan	0–1	Pontivy
51	Vannes	4–2	Vendée Luçon
52	Plouzané	0–2	Le Mans
53	Theix	2–2 (a.e.t); 6–7 pen.	Dinan-Léhon
54	Landerneau	0–1	Le Poiré-sur-Vie
55	La Suze-sur-Sarthe	0–1	Saumur
56	Cesson	2–3	TA Rennes
57	Tourcoing		Viry-Châtillon
58	Issy-les-Moulineaux	2–1	La Gorgue
59	Noeux-les-Mines	0–4	Wasquehal
60	Les Mureaux	1–3	Rouen
61	Vermelles	1–2 (a.e.t)	Dreux
62	AC Amiens	0–1	Arras
63	Quevilly	3–0	Eu
64	Douai	1–0	Red Star Saint-Ouen
65	Aulnoye Aymeries	0–1	Roye
66	Villers Outréaux	0–4	Marquette-lez-Lille
67	Boulogne-sur-Mer	2–0	Pacy Vallée-d'Eure
68	Fayet	2–1	Reims Sainte-Anne
69	Ailly-sur-Somme	0–3	Sézanne
70	Chauny	0–2	Amiens
71	Marly	2–4	Marck
72	Stade Reims	0–0 (a.e.t); 4–2 pen.	Avion
73	Raon-l'Étape	4–0	Imphy Decize
74	Le Mée	0–0 (a.e.t); 2–4 pen.	Metz
75	Chalons	1–4	Sens
76	Épinal	0–1	Drancy
77	La Chapelle Saint-Luc	1–3	Vierzon
78	Villepinte	2–2 (a.e.t); 1–4 pen.	Cheminots Paray
79	Sainte-Geneviève	0–1	Paris
80	Château Thierry	0–12	Troyes
81	Angers	2–1	Le Havre

=== Overseas region ===
Tie no	Home team	Score	Away team
1	Case-Pilote	0–2	Poissy
2	Le Geldar	0–2	Martigues
3	Magenta	1–1 (a.e.t); 5–4 pen.	Dunkerque
4	Amnéville	2–0	Moulien

Tie no	Home team	Score	Away team
5	Avranches	5–1	Majicavo Koropa
6	Poitiers	4–0	Dragon
7	Lannion	1–0	Saint-Pauloise

== Eighth Round ==
The draw for the eight round of the Coupe de France was held on 24 November 2010 at the headquarters of the French Football Federation and was conducted by current FFF president Fernando Duchaussoy. He was assisted by Laurent Huin and Mustapha Seksaoua, who each serve as president of amateur French clubs Semmoz Vieugy and AF Fayet, respectively. Both clubs are currently battling for the Petit Poucet Plaque, which is given to the best performing amateur club in the competition. The overseas draw was held the previous day and was conducted by the chairman of the Coupe de France Commission Jean Djorkaeff. The matches were played on 11–12 December.

The Créteil–Laval and L'Entente SSG–Metz matches were postponed due to inclement weather. The matches were played on 17–18 December. On 15 December, the L'Entente SSG–Metz match site was reversed to the Stade Saint-Symphorien in Metz after FFF officials discovered that the original site's pitch at the Stade Michel Hidalgo in Sannois was frozen and unlikely to be defrosted in time for the match.

Tie no	Home team	Score	Away team
1	Sedan	4–0	Amnéville
2	Pont-de-Roide	0–1	Drancy
3	Sens	0–2	Forbach
4	Thaon-les-Vosges	0–3	Strasbourg
5	Illkirch Graffenstaden	0–2	Sézanne
6	Schiltigheim	0–3	Troyes
7	Jarville	1–0	Dijon
8	Clermont	5–0	Thiers
9	Semmoz Vieugy	0–2	Evian
10	Vaulx-en-Velin	1–0	Lons-le-Saunier
11	Firminy	0–2	Jura Sud
12	Raon-l'Étape	3–2 (a.e.t)	Grenoble
13	Chambéry	4–3	Seyssinet Pariset
14	Yzeure	0–0 (a.e.t); 1–3 pen.	Cheminots Paray
15	Cannes	2–1 (a.e.t)	Ajaccio
16	Trélissac	2–1	Marignane
17	Nîmes	3–2	Istres
18	Agde	0–1 (a.e.t)	Agen
19	Martigues	2–0	Fos-sur-Mer
20	Auch	0–3	Aurillac
21	Fréjus Saint-Raphaël	0–0 (a.e.t); 3–1 pen.	Colomiers
22	Challans	0–2	Vendée Fontenay

Tie no	Home team	Score	Away team
23	Le Poiré-sur-Vie	6–0	Angoulême
24	Vierzon	0–3	Poitiers
25	Saumur	0–0 (a.e.t); 1–3 pen.	Cognac
26	Nantes	2–0	Vertou
27	Chauvigny	3–0	Châteauroux
28	Créteil	2–1	Laval
29	TA Rennes	0–1	Angers
30	Avranches	2–1 (a.e.t)	Pontivy
31	Bayeux	2–3	Le Mans
32	Cherbourg	1–0	Dreux
33	Montagnarde	1–0	Dinan-Léhon
34	Vannes	3–2	Guingamp
35	Quevilly	6–0	Lannion
36	Fayet	1–2	Issy-les-Moulineaux
37	Sannois Saint-Gratien	0–3	Metz
38	Boulogne-sur-Mer	1–0	Roye Noyon
39	Wasquehal	w/o	
40	Douai	0–5	Rouen
41	Marck	1–2 (a.e.t)	Amiens
42	Marquette-lez-Lille	1–2	Poissy
43	Arras	0–2	Stade Reims

=== Overseas region ===
Tie no	Home team	Score	Away team
1	Paris	4–0	Magenta

== Round of 64 ==
The draw for the Round of 64 of the Coupe de France was held on 13 December 2010 at l'Hôtel de Région in Bordeaux in the Aquitaine region. The draw was conducted by former women's international and current Montpellier striker Hoda Lattaf, 2004 Summer Paralympics gold medalist Joel Jeannot, and former French internationals and Bordeaux players Patrick Battiston and Marius Trésor. The matches were played on 8–9 January.

On 7 January, the federation confirmed that the Vaulx-en-Velin–Jura Sud would not be played on its scheduled date of 8 January and, would instead, be played on 15 January. The reason for the cancellation was due to the installation of temporary stands to increase spectators, which is a violation of the rules of the Coupe de France. The process of removing the stands would not be done in time for the scheduled match date.

Tie no	Home team	Score	Away team
1	Caen	0–1	Lyon
2	Toulouse	1–2	Paris
3	Agen	2–0	Poitiers
4	Bordeaux	3–1	Rouen
5	Trélissac	0–1	Quevilly
6	Chauvigny	1–3	Le Mans
7	Nantes	3–1	Cognac
8	Angers	2–1 (a.e.t)	Valenciennes
9	Créteil	1–1 (a.e.t); 5–6 pen.	Nice
10	Issy-les-Moulineaux	0–1 (a.e.t)	Brest
11	Avranches	1–3	Vendée Fontenay
12	Boulogne	2–2 (a.e.t); 5–4 pen.	Amiens
13	Montagnarde	0–0 (a.e.t); 6–7 pen.	Drancy
14	Cherbourg	1–0	Le Poiré-sur-Vie
15	Paris Saint-Germain	5–1	Lens
16	Lorient	4–1	Vannes
17	Stade Reims	1–0	Montpellier

Tie no	Home team	Score	Away team
18	Arles-Avignon	1–1 (a.e.t); 2–4 pen.	Sedan
19	Troyes	2–3 (a.e.t)	Metz
20	Wasquehal	2–1	Auxerre
21	Jarville	0–1	Sochaux
22	Poissy	1–2	Strasbourg
23	Forbach	1–3	Lille
24	Raon-l'Étape	4–0	Sézanne
25	Rennes	7–0	Cannes
26	Saint-Étienne	0–2	Clermont
27	Aurillac	2–2 (a.e.t); 3–4 pen.	Nancy
28	Evian	3–1	Marseille
29	Martigues	2–1	Cheminots Paray
30	Vaulx-en-Velin	1–1 (a.e.t); 5–4 pen.	Jura Sud
31	Nîmes	3–2	Fréjus Saint-Raphaël
32	Chambéry	1–1 (a.e.t); 3–2 pen.	AS Monaco

== Bracket ==
1st Round
Chambéry (pen.)	1(4)
Brest	1(3)
Sochaux	2
Paris	1
Angers	1
Bordeaux	0
Strasbourg	1
Evian	0
Quevilly	1(3)
Martigues (pen.)	1(5)
Agen	2
Paris Saint-Germain	3
Nîmes	1
Nancy	2
Cherbourg	0
Le Mans	1
Vaulx-en-Velin	0
Rennes	2
Clermont	1
Stade Reims	3
Boulogne	0
Drancy	1
Nice (a.e.t.)	1
Lyon	0
Wasquehal	0
Lille	1
Nantes	2
Raon-l'Étape	1
Vendée Fontenay	0
Lorient (a.e.t.)	1
Sedan	0
Metz	1

2nd Round
Chambéry	2
Sochaux	1
Angers	2
Strasbourg	0
Martigues	1
Paris Saint-Germain	4
Nancy	1
Le Mans	2
Rennes	3
Stade Reims (a.e.t.)	4
Drancy	0
Nice	1
Lille (pen.)	1(3)
Nantes	1(2)
Lorient	3
Metz	0

Quarterfinals
Chambéry	0
Angers	3
Paris Saint-Germain (a.e.t.)	2
Le Mans	0
Stade Reims	2
Nice (a.e.t.)	3
Lille (pen.)	0(5)
Lorient	0(3)

Semifinals
Angers	1
Paris Saint-Germain	3
Nice	0
Lille	2

Finals
Paris Saint-Germain	0
Lille	1

== Round of 32 ==
The draw for the Round of 32 of the Coupe de France was held on 9 January 2011 at the headquarters of Eurosport. The draw was conducted by former French international Olivier Dacourt and Laury Thilleman, the current Miss France. The matches will be played on 21–23 January.

Ahead of the Round of 32 matches, several issues involving stadiums were introduced. On 10 January, SO Chambéry officials sought another waiver from the French Football Federation (FFF) to host the team's match against Brest at the club's facility, the Stade Jacques Level. Fours day later, the federation gave the club's its approval to play the match at the stadium. On 11 January, it was confirmed that the Wasquehal–Lille match would be played at the Stade Lille-Metropole. The stadium is currently occupied by Lille, but from 1995 to 2005, Wasquehal played in the stadium. On 17 January, the mayor of the 9th arrondissement of Lyon, Alain Giordano, confirmed that the Vaulx-en-Velin–Rennes match would be played at the Stade de Balmont in nearby Lyon.

The location of the Agen–Paris Saint-German match became the subject of debate for almost an entire week. On 12 January, PSG officials sought to move the match up from 20:45 CET to 18:00 in the afternoon to allow the club enough recovery time for its next match and to also limit possible incidents involving the clubs' supporters. However, the match broadcaster, Eurosport, rejected this proposal citing the prompt rescheduling could lead to issues. After the prefecture of the Lot-et-Garonne commune, where the match would be played, ruled that the match should be played in daylight for safety reasons, the channel requested that the Wasquehal–Lille match be moved to the Agen–PSG timeslot. On 15 January, the federation confirmed that the Agen–PSG match would be played at 17:00. After getting its first request, PSG officials began questioning the safety and security of Agen's stadium and requested that the match site be moved to either the Stade Chaban-Delmas in Bordeaux or the Stadium Municipal in Toulouse. Agen officials balked at the idea stating the club's stadium had met all the guidelines and requirements of the federation. On 14 January, the federation approved Agen's stadium to host the club's match against Paris Saint-Germain. PSG officially appealed the decision soon after and the site of the match was determined on 19 January. The Federation ruled in favor of Agen.

Tie no	Home team	Score	Away team
1	Vendée Fontenay	0–1 (a.e.t)	Lorient
2	Sedan	0–1	Metz
3	Nantes	2–1	Raon-l'Étape
4	Angers	1–0	Bordeaux
5	Agen	2–3	Paris Saint-Germain
6	Cherbourg	0–1	Le Mans
7	Clermont	1–3	Stade Reims
8	Vaulx-en-Velin	0–2	Rennes
9	Nîmes	1–2	Nancy

Tie no	Home team	Score	Away team
10	Quevilly	1–1 (a.e.t); 3–5 pen.	Martigues
11	Strasbourg	1–0	Evian
12	Nice	1–0 (a.e.t)	Lyon
13	Boulogne	0–1	Drancy
14	Wasquehal	0–1	Lille
15	Chambéry	1–1 (a.e.t); 4–3 pen.	Brest
16	Sochaux	2–1	Paris

== Round of 16 ==
The draw for the Round of 16 of the Coupe de France was held on 23 January 2011 at the headquarters of Eurosport. The draw was conducted by former French men's international Franck Leboeuf, current women's international Laure Boulleau, and 2003 World Champion biathlete Sandrine Bailly. The matches were played on 1–2 February.

On 24 January, Drancy officials confirmed that the team's home match against Nice would be played at the Stade Marville de La Courneuve in Seine-Saint-Denis due to its current home stadium not meeting the guidelines of the French Football Federation.

Tie no	Home team	Score	Away team
1	Chambéry (5)	2–1	Sochaux (1)
2	Martigues (4)	1–4	Paris Saint-Germain (1)
3	Lille (1)	1–1 (a.e.t); 3–2 pen.	Nantes (2)
4	Angers (2)	2–0	Strasbourg (3)

Tie no	Home team	Score	Away team
5	Nancy (1)	1–2	Le Mans (2)
6	Rennes (1)	3–4 (a.e.t)	Stade Reims (2)
7	Lorient (1)	3–0	Metz (2)
8	Drancy (4)	0–1	Nice (1)

== Quarter-finals ==
The draw for the quarterfinals of the Coupe de France was held on 6 February 2011 as part of the television broadcast of Stade 2. The draw was conducted by former tennis player Amélie Mauresmo and Claude Onesta, the coach of the France men's national handball team, who are the current reigning European Champions, Olympic Champions. as well as double-defending World Champions having successfully defended their title in January 2011. The matches were played on 1–2 March. On the date of the draw, the French Football Federation announced that Chambéry would be playing its quarterfinal match against Angers at the Stade des Alpes in Grenoble.

1 March 2011	Stade Reims (2)	2–3 (a.e.t.)	Nice (1)	Reims
20:30 CET	Amalfitano 32'; Fortes 58'	Report	Ljuboja 31'; Mouloungui 48', 113'	Stadium: Stade Auguste-Delaune II; Attendance: 19,763; Referee: Stéphane Bré (Brittany)

2 March 2011	Chambéry (5)	0–3	Angers (2)	Grenoble
17:00 CET		Report	Saivet 44'; Renouard 64'; Gómez 84'	Stadium: Stade des Alpes; Attendance: 15,000; Referee: Philippe Kalt (Alsace)

2 March 2011	Paris Saint-Germain (1)	2–0 (a.e.t.)	Le Mans (2)	Paris
19:00 CET	Bahebeck 108'; Kebano 117'	Report		Stadium: Parc des Princes; Attendance: 12,760; Referee: Wilfried Bien (Rhône-Alpes)

2 March 2011	Lille (1)	0–0 (a.e.t.) (5–3 p)	Lorient (1)	Villeneuve-d'Ascq
20:45 CET		Report		Stadium: Stade Lille-Metropole; Attendance: 13,163; Referee: Saïd Ennjimi (Centre-Ouest)
	Penalties
	Debuchy (penalty scored); Frau (penalty scored); De Melo (penalty scored); Obraniak (penalty scored); Hazard (penalty scored)		(penalty scored) Diarra; (penalty scored) Baca; (penalty missed) Mvuemba; (penalty scored) Amalfitano

== Semi-finals ==
The draw for the semi-finals of the Coupe de France was held on 6 March 2011 as part of the television broadcast of Stade 2. The draw was conducted by film director Régis Wargnier. The matches will be played on 19–20 April.

19 April 2011	Nice (1)	0–2	Lille (1)	Nice
20:30 CEST		Report	Hazard 44'; Gervinho 46'	Stadium: Stade du Ray; Attendance: 17,135; Referee: Fredy Fautrel (Méditerranée)

20 April 2011	Angers (2)	1–3	Paris Saint-Germain (1)	Angers
20:45 CEST	Renouard 57'	Report	Bodmer 22'; Nenê 51'; Hoarau 63'	Stadium: Stade Jean Bouin; Attendance: 16,484; Referee: Bruno Coué (Basse-Normandie)

== Final ==
14 May 2011
20:45 CEST

Paris Saint-Germain	0–1	Lille
	Report	Obraniak 89'

Stade de France, Saint-Denis
Attendance: 79,000
Referee: Clément Turpin (Bourgogne)

== Media coverage ==
For the third consecutive season in France, France Télévisions were the free to air broadcasters while Eurosport were the subscription broadcasters.

These matches were broadcast live on French television:

Round	France Télévisions	Eurosport
Seventh Round		
Eighth Round		
Round of 64		
Round of 32		
Round of 16		
Quarterfinals		
Semi-finals		
Final		
