= 2022–23 Coupe de France preliminary rounds, Auvergne-Rhône-Alpes =

The 2022–23 Coupe de France preliminary rounds, Auvergne-Rhône-Alpes is the qualifying competition to decide which teams from the leagues of the Auvergne-Rhône-Alpes region of France take part in the main competition from the seventh round.

A total of nineteen teams will qualify from the Auvergne-Rhône-Alpes preliminary rounds.

In 2021–22, three teams progressed as far as the round of 64. Fifth tier Hauts Lyonnais were beaten by Ligue 2 side SC Bastia. Lyon La Duchère were eliminated by AS Saint-Étienne by a single goal. Andrézieux-Bouthéon FC also lost by a single goal to Ligue 1 opposition, Montpellier HSC.

== Draws and fixtures ==
On 18 August 2022 the league confirmed that 921 teams had entered from the region, and published the final version of the first round draw, which originally featured 768 teams from Régional 3 and District divisions. However, one tie was never scheduled. The second round draw was published on 17 August 2022, with 102 teams entering the competition from the Régional 2 division.

The third round draw was published on 6 September 2022, and saw the 24 teams from Régional 1 and 11 teams from Championnat National 3 enter the competition. The fourth round draw, which saw the entry of the seven Championnat National 2 teams, was published on 13 September 2022.

The fifth and sixth rounds were drawn together, with the draw published on 27 September 2022. The three Championnat National teams entered at the fifth round stage.

=== First round ===
These matches were played on 27 and 28 August 2022.

First round results: Auvergne-Rhône-Alpes
| Tie no | Home team (tier) | Score | Away team (tier) |
|---|---|---|---|
| 1. | AS Villettoise (10) | 0–4 | USG La Fouillouse (9) |
| 2. | SS Ussonaise (11) | 2–2 (7–6 p) (Note: SS Ussonaise penalised for fielding an ineligible player, GS Dervaux Chambon-Feugerolles qualify.) | GS Dervaux Chambon-Feugerolles (9) |
| 3. | FRS Champanges (11) | 0–2 | US Annemasse-Ambilly-Gaillard (9) |
| 4. | AS Cessieu (12) | 3–0 (Note: Tie won by means of forfeit.) | AC Poisat (11) |
| 5. | FC Vézézoux (10) | 0–3 | AS Laussonne (9) |
| 6. | ES Boulieu-lès-Annonay (10) | 1–3 | FC Péageois (8) |
| 7. | FC Goubetois (12) | 0–5 | FC Châtelet (10) |
| 8. | AG Sainte-Sigolène (11) | 0–0 (4–3 p) | Olympic Saint-Julien-Chapteuil (8) |
| 9. | Saint-Siméon SF (12) | 0–2 | USÉ Antonine (11) |
| 10. | FC Aubierois (9) | 1–1 (3–4 p) | AS Saint-Genès-Champanelle (8) |
| 11. | ALS Besse Egliseneuve (9) | 1–2 | US Bassin Minier (9) |
| 12. | CO Veyre-Monton (10) | 1–2 | AS Livradois Sud (9) |
| 13. | FF Chappes (11) | 0–3 | AS Enval-Marsat (9) |
| 14. | FC Manziat (10) | 3–0 | Olympique Saint-Denis-lès-Bourg (11) |
| 15. | AS Genevois (11) | 1–1 (2–4 p) | CS La Balme-de-Sillingy (10) |
| 16. | US Loupiac Saint-Christophe (12) | 0–2 | ES Vebret-Ydes (10) |
| 17. | US Giou de Mamou (13) | 1–6 | US Crandelles (9) |
| 18. | AS Yolet (10) | 1–4 | Carladez-Goul Sportif (9) |
| 19. | AS Saint-Just (12) | 1–7 | FC Massiac-Molompize-Blesle (9) |
| 20. | Cézallier Alagnon FC (12) | 4–2 | AS Chaudes-Aigues (11) |
| 21. | FC des Quatre Vallées (10) | 2–1 | AS Belbexoise (9) |
| 22. | ES Pierrefortaise (11) | 3–3 (5–6 p) | FC Junhac-Montsalvy (10) |
| 23. | US Cère et Landes (10) | 0–4 | Parlan-Le Rouget FC (9) |
| 24. | US de la Cère (11) | 0–2 | ES Saint-Mamet (8) |
| 25. | Aspre FC Fontanges (12) | 1–5 | AS Pleaux-Rilhac-Barriac (10) |
| 26. | AS Naucelles (11) | 0–1 | AS Espinat (9) |
| 27. | Saint-Georges SL (11) | 3–3 (4–2 p) | FC Minier (10) |
| 28. | US Carlat-Cros (12) | 0–6 | AS Sansacoise (9) |
| 29. | AS Trizac (12) | 2–3 | US Besse (11) |
| 30. | AS Neussargues (12) | 1–5 | FC Artense (10) |
| 31. | FC Albepierre-Bredons (12) | 6–1 | La Chapelle/Saint-Poncy FC (11) |
| 32. | CS Vézac (10) | 1–3 | Sud Cantal Foot (9) |
| 33. | AS Vebret-Antignac (13) | 0–9 | ES Riomois-Condat (8) |
| 34. | Saint-Jeures SJ (13) | 0–10 | FC Dunières (8) |
| 35. | FC Venteuges (12) | 1–4 | US Arsac-en-Velay (9) |
| 36. | Espérance Vieille-Brioude (11) | 0–3 | AS Cheminots Langeac (9) |
| 37. | AA Saint-Front (12) | 0–10 | AS Pertuis (10) |
| 38. | AS Saint-Pal-de-Chalencon (11) | 1–5 | US Montfaucon Montregard Raucoules (10) |
| 39. | US Lantriac (11) | 0–3 | AS Grazac-Lapte (9) |
| 40. | US Saint-Victor-Malescours (11) | 1–3 | US Bassoise (10) |
| 41. | AS Mazeyrat-d'Allier (11) | 0–4 | US Bains-Saint-Christophe (9) |
| 42. | AS Ally-Mercoeur (11) | 1–7 | US Landos (9) |
| 43. | Haut Lignon Football (10) | 3–1 | Seauve Sports (8) |
| 44. | AS Saugues (10) | 0–3 | AS Loudes (8) |
| 45. | Solignac-Cussac FC (10) | 1–2 | FC Aurec (10) |
| 46. | FC Arzon (10) | 0–1 | US Vals Le Puy (9) |
| 47. | FJEP Freycenets Saint-Jeures (10) | 1–2 | FC Saint-Germain-Laprade (9) |
| 48. | Vigilante Saint-Pal-de-Mons (10) | 2–4 | CO Coubon (10) |
| 49. | US Limons (10) | 2–5 | JS Saint-Priest-des-Champs (9) |
| 50. | RAS Beauregard l'Évêque (10) | 0–2 | FC Nord Limagne (9) |
| 51. | Pérignat FC (11) | 1–3 | FC Sauxillanges Saint-Babel Brenat (9) |
| 52. | Aulnat Sportif (11) | 5–0 | AL Glaine-Montaigut (10) |
| 53. | US Messeix Bourg-Lastic (10) | 0–4 | Clermont Métropole FC (9) |
| 54. | Entente Charblot (11) | 3–0 | FC Nord Combraille (10) |
| 55. | CS Puy-Guillaume (11) | 0–3 | CS Pont-de-Dore (9) |
| 56. | ES Volcans Malauzat (11) | 0–2 (Note: Association des Guinéens de la Région Auvergne FC penalised for fielding ineligible players, ES Volcans Malauzat qualify.) | Association des Guinéens de la Région Auvergne FC (9) |
| 57. | Clermont BF Sports International (13) | 8–1 | FC Charbonnier-les-Mines (12) |
| 58. | FC Sayat Argnat (11) | 1–3 | US Orcet (8) |
| 59. | AS Royat (9) | 3–7 | US Mozac (8) |
| 60. | Saint-Amant et Tallende SC (11) | 0–1 | FC Blanzat (9) |
| 61. | US Val de Couze Chambon (10) | 0–8 | AS Moissat (9) |
| 62. | US Saint-Gervaisienne (10) | 6–0 | AS Saint-Ours (10) |
| 63. | AS Châteaugay (13) | 3–0 | AS Pontgibaud (12) |
| 64. | ES Sauret-Besserve (13) | 3–4 | US Saint-Georges / Les Ancizes (9) |
| 65. | FC Dorat (13) | 0–2 | RS Luzillat-Charnat-Vinzelles (10) |
| 66. | ÉS Saint-Rémy-sur-Durolle (11) | 1–5 | US Gerzat (9) |
| 67. | US Menat-Neuf-Eglise (12) | 0–6 | RC Charbonnières-Paugnat (10) |
| 68. | ACS Cappadoce (11) | 2–2 (3–1 p) | SC Billom (9) |
| 69. | FC Bromont-Lamothe/Montfermy (11) | 1–1 (3–4 p) | FC Saint-Julien-de-Coppel (10) |
| 70. | US Ménétrol (12) | 2–0 | US Saint-Sylvestre-Pragoulin (12) |
| 71. | US Beauregard-Vendon (12) | 3–3 (5–4 p) | AS Job (10) |
| 72. | US Pertuis (12) | 3–1 | US Palladuc (12) |
| 73. | ES Couze Pavin (11) | 1–0 | FC Mezel (10) |
| 74. | Ecureuils Franc Rosier (9) | 5–1 (Note: Tie reversed from original draw.) | US Chapdes-Beaufort (10) |
| 75. | CS Saint-Anthème (12) | 2–2 (3–5 p) | FC Thiers Auvergne (10) |
| 76. | AS Sugères (12) | 1–5 | FC Lezoux (9) |
| 77. | FC Augerollois (12) | 0–3 | CS Saint-Bonnet-près-Riom (10) |
| 78. | FC Paslières-Noalhat (12) | 5–2 | AS Cunlhat (11) |
| 79. | FC Martres-Lussat (9) | 6–0 | AS Romagnat (8) |
| 80. | FC Vertaizon (9) | 0–18 | EFC Saint-Amant-Tallende (8) |
| 81. | AS Joze (11) | 1–0 | AS Cellule (10) |
| 82. | Entente Vallée de la Dordogne (10) | 0–5 | AS Orcines (9) |
| 83. | FC Plauzat-Champeix (10) | 0–2 | Clermont Ouvoimoja (9) |
| 84. | AS Roche-Blanche FC (11) | 1–1 (2–3 p) | US Ennezat (9) |
| 85. | Clermont Outre-Mer (10) | 1–3 | US Courpière (9) |
| 86. | ES Saint-Germinoise (10) | 0–2 | UJ Clermontoise (9) |
| 87. | Espoir Molinetois (11) | 1–3 | FC Souvigny (9) |
| 88. | FC Ébreuil (13) | 3–2 | AS Boucetoise (11) |
| 89. | Arronnes FC (13) | 0–12 | AS Nord Vignoble (9) |
| 90. | Haute Combraille Foot (11) | 0–3 | CS Vaux-Estivareilles (10) |
| 91. | AS Saint-Angel (12) | 3–0 | Montluçon FC (11) |
| 92. | US Malicorne (11) | 0–6 | Bézenet-Doyet Foot (8) |
| 93. | AS Coulanges (12) | 2–6 | Entente Lurcy-Lévis/Cérilly (10) |
| 94. | CS Paray-Loriges (13) | 2–1 | FR Pouzy-Mésangy (11) |
| 95. | AS Val de Sioule (10) | 1–9 | AS Varennes-sur-Allier (9) |
| 96. | AS Espinasse-Vozelle (13) | 4–2 | US Marcillat-Pionsat (10) |
| 97. | Entente Pierrefitte/Saligny Foot (11) | 0–4 | US Chevagnes (11) |
| 98. | US Varennes-sur-Tèche (10) | 0–2 | AS Louchy (8) |
| 99. | US Trezelles (10) | 0–4 | SC Avermes (9) |
| 100. | JS Neuvy (10) | 0–2 | US Abrest (10) |
| 101. | AS Neuilly-le-Réal (10) | 0–6 | SC Gannat (9) |
| 102. | US Saint-Victor (11) | 2–3 | CS Bessay (9) |
| 103. | AS Saint-Loup (11) | 0–6 (Note: Match abandoned due to AS Saint-Loup having insufficient players to continue.) | AS Gennetinoise (10) |
| 104. | Magnet/Seuillet/Saint-Gérand-le-Puy Foot (12) | 1–3 | Ballon Beaulonnais (10) |
| 105. | US Hyds (11) | 0–5 | AL Quinssaines (9) |
| 106. | OC Monetay-sur-Allier (11) | 3–2 | US Saulcet-Le Theil (11) |
| 107. | US Coeur Allier (11) | 2–5 | FC Haut d'Allier (10) |
| 108. | US Bien-Assis (10) | 5–1 | Bourbon Sportif (8) |
| 109. | US Vallon (10) | 1–3 | Étoile Moulins Yzeure (9) |
| 110. | CS Chantelle (12) | 0–2 | Stade Saint-Yorre (9) |
| 111. | ES Montagne Bourbonnaise (11) | 4–2 | FC Billy-Crechy (10) |
| 112. | AS Mercy-Chapeau (12) | 4–1 | AS Rongères (11) |
| 113. | AS Chassenard Luneau (11) | 5–0 | ES Vernetoise (10) |
| 114. | CS Cosne d'Allier (10) | 1–4 | Commentry FC (8) |
| 115. | AS Sanssat (12) | 1–5 | FC Creuzier-le-Neuf (11) |
| 116. | AS Tronget (10) | 2–1 | US Biachette Désertines (10) |
| 117. | CS Thielois (12) | 1–6 | AS Dompierroise (9) |
| 118. | AS Montréal-la-Cluse (8) | 5–2 | Ambérieu FC (9) |
| 119. | AS Attignat (10) | 1–3 | CS Viriat (8) |
| 120. | AS Bâgé-le-Châtel (11) | 0–5 | Bourg Sud (9) |
| 121. | FC Balan (12) | 0–3 | CSJ Châtillonnaise (11) |
| 122. | AS Saint-Laurentin (11) | 0–3 | US Replonges (10) |
| 123. | FC Bord de Veyle (11) | 0–1 | FC Bressans (9) |
| 124. | Association des Portugais d'Oyonnax (11) | 5–0 | AS Izernore Nurieux-Volognat (10) |
| 125. | ES Cormoranche (12) | 0–5 | Valserine FC (10) |
| 126. | CS Chevroux (11) | 2–7 | Jassans-Frans Foot (9) |
| 127. | CO Plateau (12) | 4–2 | AS Salazie (13) |
| 128. | FC Curtafond-Confrançon-Saint-Martin-Saint-Didier (10) | 0–1 | Bresse Foot 01 (9) |
| 129. | Côtière Meximieux Villieu (11) | 2–3 | Saint-Denis-Ambutrix FC (10) |
| 130. | AS Grièges Pont de Veyle (12) | 1–2 | ES Val de Saône (10) |
| 131. | AS Anglefort (12) | 0–3 | Entente Saint-Martin-du-Frêne/Maillat/Combe du Val (10) |
| 132. | FO Bourg-en-Bresse (10) | 4–1 | US Arbent Marchon (9) |
| 133. | FC Artemare (12) | 0–2 | US Culoz Grand Colombier (10) |
| 134. | FC Serrières-Villebois (11) | 1–2 | Olympique Rives de l'Ain-Pays du Cerdon (9) |
| 135. | Olympique Sud Revermont 01 (10) | 0–2 | FC Plaine Tonique (9) |
| 136. | FO Leymentais (13) | 0–2 | US Plaine de l'Ain (11) |
| 137. | FC Injoux-Génissiat (12) | 3–6 | US Veyziat (11) |
| 138. | Olympique Buyatin (11) | 2–5 | FC Côtière-Luenaz (10) |
| 139. | FC Priay (12) | 1–4 | US Vaux-en-Bugey (11) |
| 140. | AS Travailleurs Turcs Oyonnax (10) | 3–0 | AS Vertrieu (12) |
| 141. | CS Valromey (13) | 2–11 | US Nantua (10) |
| 142. | Plaine Revermont Foot (10) | 1–0 | CS Belley (9) |
| 143. | AS Chaveyriat-Chanoz (12) | 3–2 | AS Hautecourt-Romanèche (11) |
| 144. | FC Veyle-Vieux-Jonc (12) | 0–9 | ES Revermontoise (9) |
| 145. | US Dombes-Chalamont (11) | 3–3 (3–1 p) | Chazay FC (10) |
| 146. | FC Dombes (10) | 0–2 | RC Béligny (10) |
| 147. | Foot Trois Rivières (11) | 2–0 | Sud Azergues Foot (11) |
| 148. | SC Mille Étangs (12) | 0–3 | FC Franc Lyonnais (11) |
| 149. | FC Mas-Rillier (12) | 0–6 | US Montanay (11) |
| 150. | US Formans (12) | 0–4 | AS Guéreins-Genouilleux (10) |
| 151. | FC Reneins Vauxonne (11) | 3–1 | Fareins Saône Vallée Foot (11) |
| 152. | SC Portes de l'Ain (9) | 1–3 | US Millery-Vourles (8) |
| 153. | ISN FC Chaniens (13) | 1–1 (2–4 p) | Olympique Rillieux (9) |
| 154. | FC Saint-Maurice-de-Gourdans (11) | 3–0 | Mions FC (9) |
| 155. | FC Meys-Grézieu (9) | 0–1 | AS Villeurbanne Éveil Lyonnais (8) |
| 156. | FC Denicé Arnas (11) | 1–2 | UGA Lyon-Décines (8) |
| 157. | AS Rhodanienne (10) | 2–3 | FC Colombier-Satolas (8) |
| 158. | CAS Cheminots Oullins Lyon (9) | 3–1 | FC Dombes-Bresse (8) |
| 159. | GS Chasse (10) | 1–4 | SO Pont-de-Chéruy-Chavanoz (8) |
| 160. | FC Point du Jour (10) | 2–3 | CO Saint-Fons (9) |
| 161. | ÉS Liergues (9) | 1–0 | AS Saint-Martin-en-Haut (8) |
| 162. | Lyon Croix-Rousse Football (11) | 1–3 | CS Meginand (9) |
| 163. | US Cheminots Lyon Vaise (11) | 0–3 | ES Genas Azieu (9) |
| 164. | ES Frontonas-Chamagnieu (11) | 0–3 | AS Algerienne Villeurbanne (9) |
| 165. | SC Revolée (12) | 2–3 | Latino AFC Lyon (11) |
| 166. | AS Saint-Forgeux (10) | 0–4 | FC Mont Brouilly (9) |
| 167. | AS Écully (11) | 0–4 | Feyzin Club Belle Étoile (9) |
| 168. | ASA Clochemerle (11) | 3–3 (2–4 p) | FC Pontcharra-Saint-Loup (9) |
| 169. | FC Franchevillois (11) | 1–7 | FC Pays de l'Arbresle (9) |
| 170. | ES Charly Foot (11) | 0–4 | ASM Saint-Pierre-la-Palud (10) |
| 171. | ACS Mayotte du Rhône (11) | 1–2 | Savigny FC (10) |
| 172. | SC Bron-Terraillon (11) | 1–9 | FC Sainte-Foy-lès-Lyon (10) |
| 173. | US Des Monts (11) | 0–10 | FC Sud Ouest 69 (10) |
| 174. | ES Gleizé (11) | 1–2 | ES Saint-Priest (10) |
| 175. | CS Ozon (11) | 0–0 (3–1 p) | AS Portugaise Vaulx-en-Velin (10) |
| 176. | Rhône Sud FC (12) | 0–2 | US Loire-Saint-Romain (10) |
| 177. | AS Pusignan (11) | 0–0 (5–6 p) | Éveil de Lyon (10) |
| 178. | AS Limas (12) | 0–12 | FC Saint-Romain-de-Popey (10) |
| 179. | FC La Giraudière (12) | 1–2 | US Côteaux Lyonnais (11) |
| 180. | US Est Lyonnais (9) | 1–5 | Olympique Vaulx-en-Venlin (9) |
| 181. | AS Diémoz (11) | 1–1 (2–4 p) | CS Verpillière (9) |
| 182. | Chambost-Allières-Saint-Just-d'Avray (11) | 1–1 (2–4 p) | Haute Brévenne Football (10) |
| 183. | FC Grigny (10) | 4–1 | FC Antillais Villeurbanne (11) |
| 184. | Association Chandieu-Heyrieux (10) | 2–2 (12–13 p) | AS Toussieu (11) |
| 185. | US Villette-d'Anthon-Janneyrais (11) | 3–0 | JS Irigny (10) |
| 186. | Saône Mont d'Or FC (10) | 2–2 (3–4 p) | FC Gerland Lyon (10) |
| 187. | Caluire SC (9) | 3–0 | FC Ternay (11) |
| 188. | Muroise Foot (11) | 2–3 | AS Buers Villeurbanne (10) |
| 189. | FC Fontaines-sur-Saône (11) | 2–2 (4–5 p) | JSO Givors (10) |
| 190. | SC Maccabi Lyon (11) | 2–0 | FC Lamure Poule (10) |
| 191. | CS Vaulxois (12) | 0–10 | Ménival FC (9) |
| 192. | Lyon Ouest SC (10) | 2–1 | US Meyzieu (9) |
| 193. | US Ouest Lyonnais (11) | 1–2 | Belleville Football Beaujolais (9) |
| 194. | CS Lyon 8 (12) | 0–3 | FC Croix Roussien (11) |
| 195. | AS Sornins Réunis (12) | 0–0 (5–4 p) | FC Tarare (11) |
| 196. | Rhins Trambouze Foot (11) | 5–0 | Beaujolais Football (10) |
| 197. | Sorbiers-La Talaudière (9) | 4–2 | US L'Horme (9) |
| 198. | CO La Rivière (10) | 2–4 | Football Mont-Pilat (9) |
| 199. | FC Commelle-Vernay (10) | 2–2 (4–1 p) | Roanne AS Parc du Sport (8) |
| 200. | AF Pays de Coise (9) | 4–1 | FC Saint-Étienne (9) |
| 201. | FC Plaine Cleppé/Poncins (11) | 1–7 | FCI Saint-Romain-le-Puy (10) |
| 202. | Périgneux Saint-Maurice Foot (11) | 1–9 | US Métare Saint-Étienne Sud Est (11) |
| 203. | Olympique du Montcel (10) | 0–6 | Haut Pilat Interfoot (10) |
| 204. | ES Dyonisienne (11) | 5–1 | CS Crémeaux (10) |
| 205. | AS Saint-Ferréol Gampille Firminy (11) | 2–4 | ES Saint-Christo-Marcenod (9) |
| 206. | FC Marcellinois (11) | 4–4 (3–1 p) | US Ecotay-Moingt (10) |
| 207. | US Parigny Saint-Cyr (11) | 1–1 (5–4 p) | FR Moulins-Cherier (11) |
| 208. | US Briennon (11) | 1–4 | Olympique Le Coteau (10) |
| 209. | Bellegarde Sports (12) | 2–5 | Toranche FC (11) |
| 210. | AS Finerbal Nervieux Balbigny (12) | 0–5 | FC Montagnes du Matin (10) |
| 211. | FC Belette de Saint-Léger (12) | 0–2 | Olympique Est Roannais (10) |
| 212. | ES Saint-Jean-Bonnefonds (12) | 1–3 | Olympique Saint-Étienne (11) |
| 213. | AS Noirétable (11) | 1–1 (4–5 p) | ÉS Montrondaise (11) |
| 214. | FC Perreux (11) | 2–4 | Avenir Côte Foot (10) |
| 215. | FC Montagny (11) | 1–4 | FC Loire Sornin (10) |
| 216. | JS Cellieu (9) | 5–0 | Forez Donzy FC (10) |
| 217. | Lignon FC (10) | 1–1 (4–2 p) | AS Chambéon-Magneux (9) |
| 218. | FC Bords de Loire (12) | 0–3 | AS Châteauneuf (10) |
| 219. | US Sud Forézienne (10) | 0–7 | Anzieux Foot (9) |
| 220. | AS Saint-Just-Saint-Rambert (10) | 4–4 (4–2 p) | AC Rive-de-Gier (9) |
| 221. | FC Saint-Martin-la-Sauveté (11) | 0–1 | US Bussières (10) |
| 222. | AS Saint-Just-en-Chevalet (12) | 1–5 | US Filerin (11) |
| 223. | FC Bonson-Saint-Cyprien (12) | 2–4 | FC Boisset-Chalain (10) |
| 224. | AS Villers (12) | 2–2 (3–1 p) | Nord Roannais (11) |
| 225. | FC Ouches (12) | 2–1 | US Villerest (11) |
| 226. | US Monts du Forez (13) | 1–4 | Sury SC (11) |
| 227. | AS Cuzieu (13) | 2–5 | AS Astrée (12) |
| 228. | ABH FC (12) | 5–5 (5–6 p) | ES Champdieu-Marcilly (9) |
| 229. | AS Chausseterre Les Salles (12) | 0–3 | Riorges FC (10) |
| 230. | Saint-Romain-les-Atheux Sports (12) | 3–0 | FC Saint-Joseph-Saint-Martin (11) |
| 231. | AS La Chaumière (13) | 0–2 | Saint-Étienne UC Terrenoire (11) |
| 232. | Olympique Terrenoire (13) | 0–3 | FC Feu Vert Saint-Chamond (11) |
| 233. | ES Haut Forez (12) | 2–5 | AS Algérienne Chambon-Feugerolles (8) |
| 234. | OC Ondaine (11) | 0–9 | FC Saint-Paul-en-Jarez (8) |
| 235. | Entente Sarras Sports Saint-Vallier (10) | 3–2 | Valence FC (8) |
| 236. | US Vals-les-Bains (12) | 1–2 | AS Coucouron (11) |
| 237. | CS Malataverne (12) | 1–4 | US Baixoise (12) |
| 238. | FC Clérieux-Saint-Bardoux-Granges-les-Beaumont (12) | 0–1 | FC Turquoise (11) |
| 239. | US 2 Vallons (12) | 1–3 | US Pont-La Roche (11) |
| 240. | FA Le Teil Melas (13) | 0–3 | FC Saint-Didier-sous-Aubenas (12) |
| 241. | ES Saint-Alban Auriolles-Grospierres (13) | 1–3 | RC Savasson (12) |
| 242. | AS Saint-Marcelloise (12) | 1–7 | AS Vallée du Doux (11) |
| 243. | FC Sauzet (12) | 3–3 (3–0 p) | Allex-Chabrillan-Eurre FC (11) |
| 244. | FC Saint-Restitut (12) | 4–1 | US Veyras (12) |
| 245. | OS Vallée de l'Ouvèze (12) | 2–2 (1–4 p) | AS Roussas-Granges-Gontardes (11) |
| 246. | US Bas-Vivarais (11) | 1–1 (5–4 p) | FR Allan (10) |
| 247. | US Drôme Provence (12) | 0–1 | US Ancône (11) |
| 248. | CS Lapeyrousien (13) | 0–3 | AS Saint-Uze (12) |
| 249. | Vallis Auréa Foot (11) | 5–5 (3–5 p) | ES Beaumonteleger (10) |
| 250. | ES Nord Drôme (11) | 2–1 | FC Larnage-Serves (11) |
| 251. | AAJ Saint-Alban-d'Ay (11) | 1–2 | FC Muzolais (10) |
| 252. | FC Rambertois (12) | 0–3 | FC Bourguisan (10) |
| 253. | JS Saint-Paul-lès-Romans (12) | 0–1 | US Vallée du Jabron (11) |
| 254. | FC Colombier Saint-Barthélemy (11) | 1–1 (1–3 p) | AS Cornas (10) |
| 255. | AC Allet (12) | 0–5 | FC Hauterive (10) |
| 256. | AS Dolon (11) | 3–0 | EA Montvendre (12) |
| 257. | SC Romans (13) | 0–2 | AS Génissieux (12) |
| 258. | ES Le Laris-Montchenu (13) | 3–3 (4–3 p) | US Peyrins (12) |
| 259. | ES Trèfle (12) | 1–3 | AS Roiffieux (11) |
| 260. | ÉS Saint-Jeure-d'Ay-Marsan (12) | 2–0 | AS La Sanne (12) |
| 261. | ES Malissardoise (12) | 2–1 | FC Hermitage (11) |
| 262. | AS Cancoise (12) | 2–2 (2–4 p) | IF Barbières-Bésayes-Rochefort-Samson-Marches (11) |
| 263. | AS Homenetmen Bourg-lès Valence (11) | 1–0 | FC Félines-Saint-Cyr-Peaugres (11) |
| 264. | CO Châteauneuf-du-Rhône (12) | 1–5 | US Montélier (11) |
| 265. | FC La Coucourde (12) | 0–3 | JS Livron (12) |
| 266. | AOC Saint-Remèze (13) | 2–3 | FC Rochegudien (11) |
| 267. | Vivar's Club Soyons (13) | 0–3 | FC Baume Montségur (12) |
| 268. | FC Rochepaule (13) | 0–6 | AS Saint-Barthélemy-Grozon (12) |
| 269. | CS Châteauneuf-de-Galaure (12) | 3–0 | AS Portugaise Valence (11) |
| 270. | US Beaufortoise (12) | 0–4 | FC Bren (11) |
| 271. | AF Ceven (13) | 0–3 | US Rochemaure (11) |
| 272. | SC Piraillon (12) | 0–4 | RC Mauves (10) |
| 273. | US Val d'Ay (11) | 1–3 | FC Bourg-lès-Valence (10) |
| 274. | FC Berzème (12) | 3–0 | FC Aubenas (11) |
| 275. | RC Tournon-Tain (11) | 0–2 | Espérance Hostunoise (10) |
| 276. | US Saint-Just-Saint-Marcel (10) | 4–3 | SC Cruas (9) |
| 277. | FC 540 (11) | 0–3 | CO Donzère (10) |
| 278. | FC Montélimar (10) | 3–1 | Olympique Ruomsois (9) |
| 279. | CO Châteauneuvois (10) | 1–1 (4–3 p) | ES Chomérac (9) |
| 280. | US Saint-Gervais-sur-Roubion (11) | 2–2 (4–2 p) | US Mours (9) |
| 281. | FC Cheylarois (11) | 2–9 | Olympique Centre Ardèche (9) |
| 282. | AS Berg-Helvie (10) | 1–2 | US Portes Hautes Cévennes (9) |
| 283. | FC Portois (10) | 2–3 | US Davézieux-Vidalon (9) |
| 284. | US Chanas Sablons Serrières (10) | 0–2 | FC Eyrieux Embroye (8) |
| 285. | FC Plateau Ardèchois (11) | 2–2 (3–4 p) | AS Véore Montoison (9) |
| 286. | Diois FC (10) | 1–6 | PS Romanaise (8) |
| 287. | FC Chirens (12) | 1–2 | ASL Saint-Cassien (9) |
| 288. | US Beauvoir-Royas (11) | 2–4 | AS Oyeu Burcin (11) |
| 289. | FC Agnin (13) | 2–4 | AS Saint-Lattier (11) |
| 290. | US Montgasconnaise (11) | 2–2 (4–3 p) | FC Versoud (9) |
| 291. | US Thodure (12) | 0–5 | Saint-Martin-d'Hères FC (9) |
| 292. | CS Faramans (11) | 4–2 | Vallée du Guiers FC (9) |
| 293. | FC Virieu-Valondras (12) | 0–9 | FC Seyssins (9) |
| 294. | Stade Chabonnais (11) | 1–0 | US Jarrie-Champ (9) |
| 295. | Crémieu FC (12) | 3–2 | Olympique Les Avenières (11) |
| 296. | FC Saint-Martin-d'Uriage (12) | 0–2 | JS Saint-Georgeoise (10) |
| 297. | Claix Football (11) | 0–2 | AS Vézeronce-Huert (9) |
| 298. | FC Vallée de l'Hien (10) | 1–1 (4–5 p) | AJA Villeneuve (9) |
| 299. | RC Bouvesse (12) | 5–0 | Le Grand-Lemps/Colombe/Apprieu Foot 38 (11) |
| 300. | Eclose Châteauvilain Badinières Football (10) | 2–4 | US Ruy Montceau (9) |
| 301. | CS Miribel (11) | 1–1 (4–5 p) | US Corbelin (10) |
| 302. | US Chatte (11) | 2–9 | AL Saint-Maurice-l'Exil (9) |
| 303. | Deux Rochers FC (11) | 1–1 (4–2 p) | FC Voiron-Moirans (9) |
| 304. | AS Cheyssieu (11) | 2–3 | FC Balmes Nord-Isère (10) |
| 305. | UO Portugal Saint-Martin-d'Hères (10) | 1–9 | OC Eybens (8) |
| 306. | Artas Charantonnay FC (10) | 5–1 | US Reventin (9) |
| 307. | FC des Collines (10) | 1–2 | FC Allobroges Asafia (9) |
| 308. | Chaleyssin-Valencin-Luxinay 38 FC (10) | 2–1 | ASF Portugais (11) |
| 309. | US Abbaye (12) | 5–3 | AS Saint-Joseph-de-Rivière (11) |
| 310. | Moirans FC (11) | 2–1 | ASJF Domène (10) |
| 311. | Saint-Quentin-Fallavier FC (11) | 2–0 | Union Nord Iséroise (10) |
| 312. | AS Grésivaudan (11) | 0–3 | AS Italienne Européenne Grenoble (10) |
| 313. | FC Tignieu-Jameyzieu (11) | 3–0 | CS Nivolas-Vermelle (10) |
| 314. | AS Tullins-Fures (10) | 0–4 | FC Crolles-Bernin (8) |
| 315. | AS Ver Sau (9) | 1–3 | US La Murette (8) |
| 316. | CS Voreppe (10) | 1–9 | FC Vallée de la Gresse (8) |
| 317. | Saint-Alban Sportif (10) | 1–2 | US Creys-Morestel (9) |
| 318. | Rives SF (9) | 3–1 | AS Saint-André-le-Gaz (8) |
| 319. | US Dolomoise (10) | 0–0 (5–4 p) | Olympique Villefontaine (9) |
| 320. | US Cassolards Passageois (12) | 1–2 | Beaucroissant FC (11) |
| 321. | US La Bâtie-Divisin (12) | 2–2 (2–4 p) | US Saint-Geoire-en-Valdaine (12) |
| 322. | US Le Bouchage (12) | 2–2 (5–3 p) | EF des Étangs (11) |
| 323. | US Ro-Claix (11) | 1–4 | Vourey Sports (12) |
| 324. | US Saint-Paul-de-Varces (11) | 2–4 | US Village Olympique Grenoble (10) |
| 325. | ASCOL Foot 38 (11) | 0–3 | FC Lauzes (10) |
| 326. | Isle d'Abeau FC (10) | 1–2 | CF Estrablin (9) |
| 327. | FC La Sure (11) | 3–1 | Noyarey FC (10) |
| 328. | US Sassenage (9) | 2–2 (2–4 p) | FC Sud Isère (10) |
| 329. | AS Crossey (12) | 1–2 | Formafoot Bièvre Valloire (9) |
| 330. | AS Barbarez (12) | 0–8 | Montmélian AF (9) |
| 331. | Chambéry Sport 73 (11) | 2–6 | Nivolet FC (8) |
| 332. | Cognin Sports (9) | 2–1 | Entente Val d'Hyères (9) |
| 333. | AS Montagny (13) | 0–4 | AS Mont Jovet Bozel (11) |
| 334. | AS Haute Combe de Savoie (12) | 0–9 | FC Laissaud (10) |
| 335. | FC Villargondran (11) | 0–2 | US Modane (10) |
| 336. | AS Cuines-La Chambre Val d'Arc (11) | 3–4 | US Grignon (10) |
| 337. | AS Novalaise (11) | 1–3 | Cœur de Savoie (10) |
| 338. | FC Saint-Michel Sports (11) | 1–0 | USC Aiguebelle (10) |
| 339. | CA Yennne (11) | 3–1 | US Pontoise (9) |
| 340. | FC La Rochette (11) | 1–6 | FC Belle Étoile Mercury (9) |
| 341. | FC Sud Lac (10) | 1–6 | US Chartreuse Guiers (9) |
| 342. | US La Ravoire (10) | 2–1 | Association Portugaise Croix Rouge Chambéry (9) |
| 343. | FC des Bauges (12) | 1–2 | UO Albertville (9) |
| 344. | FC Apremont (12) | 1–1 (5–4 p) | AS Ugine (9) |
| 345. | US Grand Mont La Bâthie (11) | 0–2 | FC Haute Tarentaise (9) |
| 346. | US Motteraine (8) | 5–1 | FC Saint-Baldoph (11) |
| 347. | SC Morzine Vallée d'Aulps (10) | 2–0 | CS Ayze (9) |
| 348. | AS Évires (11) | 1–6 | ASC Sallanches (9) |
| 349. | FC Vuache (11) | 0–5 | ES Seynod (9) |
| 350. | AS Lac Bleu (11) | 1–3 | FC Thônes (9) |
| 351. | CSL Perrignier (12) | 0–3 | JS Reignier (9) |
| 352. | FC Gavot (11) | 2–4 | SS Allinges (9) |
| 353. | Union Salève Foot (10) | 0–3 | FC Ballaison (9) |
| 354. | ES Thyez (10) | 3–4 | US Mont Blanc (8) |
| 355. | AG Bons-en-Chablais (10) | 2–3 (Note: CS Amphion Publier penalised for fielding an ineligible player, AG Bons-en-Chablais qualify.) | CS Amphion Publier (8) |
| 356. | FC La Filière (10) | 0–3 | Pays de Gex FC (8) |
| 357. | US Margencel (11) | 3–2 | ES Amancy (9) |
| 358. | Haut Giffre FC (10) | 2–1 | Marignier Sports (9) |
| 359. | AS Parmelan Villaz (11) | 0–5 | AS Sillingy (9) |
| 360. | FC Frangy (11) | 1–3 | US Argonay (9) |
| 361. | FC Cranves-Sales (11) | 0–3 | ES Cernex (10) |
| 362. | FC Leman Presqu'île (12) | 2–5 | AJ Ville-la-Grand (10) |
| 363. | FC Anthy Sport (12) | 0–6 | ES Fillinges (10) |
| 364. | ES Valleiry (11) | 1–0 | FC Chéran (10) |
| 365. | FC Les Houches-Servoz (13) | 1–10 | FC Cluses (10) |
| 366. | AS Épagny-Metz-Tessy (12) | 0–1 | CS Saint-Pierre (11) |
| 367. | AS Thonon (12) | 3–2 | ES Douvaine-Loisin (11) |
| 368. | ES Sciez (12) | 0–3 | FC Évian (11) |
| 369. | FC Semine (11) | 1–4 | CO Chavanod (10) |
| 370. | CS Vacheresse Vallée d'Abondance (12) | 2–5 | AS Le Lyaud-Armoy (10) |
| 371. | CS Chamonix (12) | 2–2 (4–5 p) | FC Combloux (10) |
| 372. | US Challex (12) | 0–1 | ES Saint-Jeoire-La Tour (10) |
| 373. | Échenevex-Ségny-Chevry Olympique (10) | 2–2 (5–6 p) | CSA Poisy (10) |
| 374. | FC Aravis (12) | 0–3 | ES Lanfonnet (11) |
| 375. | US Pers-Jussy (12) | 3–5 | AS Prévessin-Moëns (11) |
| 376. | AS Marin (12) | 0–2 | CS Veigy-Foncenex (11) |
| 377. | FC Villy-le-Pelloux (12) | 0–1 | ES Meythet (11) |
| 378. | AS Portugais Annecy (12) | 3–0 | Olympique Cran (11) |
| 379. | CS Megève (12) | 0–3 | AS Portugais Faverges (11) |
| 380. | CA Bonnevillois 1921 (11) | 7–2 | Marnaz FC (13) |
| 381. | Olympique Saint-Montanais (12) | 2–2 (3–4 p) | US Lussas (11) |
| 382. | US Vétraz-Monthoux (12) | 3–0 | FC Arenthon-Scientrier (11) |
| 383. | Jordanne FC (11) | 2–2 (3–4 p) | CS Arpajonnais (9) |
| 384. | FC Montluel (12) | 0–8 | AS Genay (11) |

=== Second round ===
These matches were played on 2, 3 and 4 September 2022, with one replayed on 10 September 2022.

Second round results: Auvergne-Rhône-Alpes
| Tie no | Home team (tier) | Score | Away team (tier) |
|---|---|---|---|
| 1. | FC Junhac-Montsalvy (10) | 3–1 | US Crandelles (9) |
| 2. | FC Artense (10) | 1–0 | US Murat (8) |
| 3. | UGA Lyon-Décines (8) | 3–2 | FC Bords de Saône (8) |
| 4. | SO Pont-de-Chéruy-Chavanoz (8) | 3–0 | CS Meginand (9) |
| 5. | US Davézieux-Vidalon (9) | 2–0 | UMS Montélimar (8) |
| 6. | CS Arpajonnais (9) | 0–4 | US Vallée de l'Authre (7) |
| 7. | US Bassoise (10) | 0–2 | AS Emblavez-Vorey (7) |
| 8. | FC Pontcharra-Saint-Loup (9) | 1–2 | Olympique Belleroche Villefranche (8) |
| 9. | FC La Sure (11) | 1–3 | FC Vallée de la Gresse (8) |
| 10. | CSA Poisy (10) | 2–2 (5–3 p) | US Semnoz-Vieugy (8) |
| 11. | USG La Fouillouse (9) | 0–4 | L'Étrat-La Tour Sportif (7) |
| 12. | FC Massiac-Molompize-Blesle (9) | 0–1 | ES Riomois-Condat (8) |
| 13. | Sud Cantal Foot (9) | 1–1 (4–3 p) | AS Pleaux-Rilhac-Barriac (10) |
| 14. | Aulnat Sportif (11) | 2–0 | US Maringues (8) |
| 15. | AS Enval-Marsat (9) | 3–4 (Note: Tie reversed from original draw.) | ES Couze Pavin (11) |
| 16. | FC Gerland Lyon (10) | 1–1 (4–2 p) | US Villette-d'Anthon-Janneyrais (11) |
| 17. | FC Saint-Didier-sous-Aubenas (12) | 0–1 | RC Savasson (12) |
| 18. | FC Balmes Nord-Isère (10) | 2–1 | Saint-Quentin-Fallavier FC (11) |
| 19. | AJA Villeneuve (9) | 1–3 (Note: Olympique Saint-Marcellin penalised for fielding a suspended player, AJA Villeneuve qualify.) | Olympique Saint-Marcellin (7) |
| 20. | UO Albertville (9) | 4–5 | US Grignon (10) |
| 21. | ASC Sallanches (9) | 0–3 | FC Foron (8) |
| 22. | FC Combloux (10) | 2–5 | US Mont Blanc (8) |
| 23. | FC Évian (11) | 2–3 | US Annemasse-Ambilly-Gaillard (9) |
| 24. | AG Bons-en-Chablais (10) | 3–2 | Haut Giffre FC (10) |
| 25. | Cézallier Alagnon FC (12) | 1–2 | ES Vebret-Ydes (10) |
| 26. | FC des Quatre Vallées (10) | 0–0 (5–3 p) | FC Ally Mauriac (8) |
| 27. | US Besse (11) | 1–4 | AS Espinat (9) |
| 28. | FC Albepierre-Bredons (12) | 0–13 | Entente Nord Lozère (7) |
| 29. | AS Sansacoise (9) | 1–1 (4–5 p) | Carladez-Goul Sportif (9) |
| 30. | ES Saint-Mamet (8) | 1–1 (4–5 p) | Ytrac Foot (7) |
| 31. | Saint-Georges SL (11) | 1–1 (4–5 p) | Parlan-Le Rouget FC (9) |
| 32. | AS Pertuis (10) | 1–5 | SC Langogne (8) |
| 33. | AS Cheminots Langeac (9) | 2–2 (4–2 p) | US Fontannoise (8) |
| 34. | CO Coubon (10) | 0–3 | AS Chadrac (8) |
| 35. | FC Saint-Germain-Laprade (9) | 1–3 | AS Saint-Didier-Saint-Just (8) |
| 36. | US Bains-Saint-Christophe (9) | 0–6 | US Monistrol (7) |
| 37. | AS Laussonne (9) | 0–2 | US Sucs et Lignon (7) |
| 38. | US Arsac-en-Velay (9) | 1–3 | Sauveteurs Brivois (8) |
| 39. | Haut Lignon Football (10) | 2–1 | Association Vergongheon-Arvant (7) |
| 40. | FC Aurec (10) | 1–4 | US Brioude (7) |
| 41. | AS Grazac-Lapte (9) | 4–2 | Retournac Sportif (8) |
| 42. | US Vals Le Puy (9) | 4–1 | US Landos (9) |
| 43. | AG Sainte-Sigolène (11) | 1–1 (2–4 p) | AS Loudes (8) |
| 44. | US Montfaucon Montregard Raucoules (10) | 2–1 | FC Dunières (8) |
| 45. | FC Martres-Lussat (9) | 0–6 | FC Cournon-d'Auvergne (7) |
| 46. | AS Joze (11) | 1–2 | US Beaumontoise (7) |
| 47. | US Gerzat (9) | 0–3 | FC Châtel-Guyon (7) |
| 48. | UJ Clermontoise (9) | 0–2 | US Issoire (7) |
| 49. | FC Sauxillanges Saint-Babel Brenat (9) | 0–2 | Cébazat Sports (7) |
| 50. | US Bassin Minier (9) | 2–2 (5–4 p) | CS Pont-du-Château (7) |
| 51. | FC Thiers Auvergne (10) | 1–1 (3–1 p) | Espérance Ceyratois Football (8) |
| 52. | US Saint-Gervaisienne (10) | 2–2 (8–9 p) | US Saint-Beauzire (8) |
| 53. | ACS Cappadoce (11) | 2–6 | FCUS Ambert (8) |
| 54. | Ecureuils Franc Rosier (9) | 3–2 | US Vic-le-Comte (8) |
| 55. | Clermont Ouvoimoja (9) | 0–0 (4–5 p) | Dômes-Sancy Foot (8) |
| 56. | RC Charbonnières-Paugnat (10) | 3–2 | FC Nord Limagne (9) |
| 57. | Entente Charblot (11) | 0–4 | AS Saint-Genès-Champanelle (8) |
| 58. | US Ménétrol (12) | 0–2 | FC Blanzat (9) |
| 59. | FC Paslières-Noalhat (12) | 0–1 | FC Saint-Julien-de-Coppel (10) |
| 60. | Clermont BF Sports International (13) | 1–2 | CS Saint-Bonnet-près-Riom (10) |
| 61. | CS Pont-de-Dore (9) | 2–5 | US Courpière (9) |
| 62. | US Saint-Georges / Les Ancizes (9) | 1–8 | US Orcet (8) |
| 63. | US Pertuis (12) | 1–8 | US Mozac (8) |
| 64. | US Beauregard-Vendon (12) | 1–4 | AS Orcines (9) |
| 65. | RS Luzillat-Charnat-Vinzelles (10) | 0–3 | AS Moissat (9) |
| 66. | FC Lezoux (9) | 2–2 (6–5 p) | US Ennezat (9) |
| 67. | AS Livradois Sud (9) | 1–3 | EFC Saint-Amant-Tallende (8) |
| 68. | FC Creuzier-le-Neuf (11) | 2–6 | Étoile Moulins Yzeure (9) |
| 69. | AS Saint-Angel (12) | 2–3 | US Vendat Bellerive Brugheas (8) |
| 70. | AS Espinasse-Vozelle (13) | 1–0 | AS Chassenard Luneau (11) |
| 71. | AS Dompierroise (9) | 0–1 | SCA Cussét (7) |
| 72. | Entente Lurcy-Lévis/Cérilly (10) | 4–1 | AL Quinssaines (9) |
| 73. | AS Gennetinoise (10) | 1–8 | AS Nord Vignoble (9) |
| 74. | SC Gannat (9) | 0–6 | AC Creuzier-le-Vieux (8) |
| 75. | SC Avermes (9) | 3–0 | AS Tronget (10) |
| 76. | AS Mercy-Chapeau (12) | 0–4 | US Lignerolles-Lavault Sainte-Anne Prémilhat (8) |
| 77. | CS Paray-Loriges (13) | 1–2 | FC Haut d'Allier (10) |
| 78. | ES Montagne Bourbonnaise (11) | 3–2 | CS Bessay (9) |
| 79. | Ballon Beaulonnais (10) | 0–2 | Stade Saint-Yorre (9) |
| 80. | US Abrest (10) | 2–3 | FC Souvigny (9) |
| 81. | AS Varennes-sur-Allier (9) | 1–1 (4–1 p) | AS Cheminots Saint-Germain (8) |
| 82. | US Chevagnes (11) | 0–1 | Commentry FC (8) |
| 83. | JS Saint-Priest-des-Champs (9) | 2–0 | CS Vaux-Estivareilles (10) |
| 84. | Bézenet-Doyet Foot (8) | 2–0 | AS Louchy (8) |
| 85. | US Bien-Assis (10) | 2–1 | SC Saint-Pourcain (7) |
| 86. | FC Ébreuil (13) | 0–2 | OC Monetay-sur-Allier (11) |
| 87. | FO Bourg-en-Bresse (10) | 0–13 | AS Montréal-la-Cluse (8) |
| 88. | CS Viriat (8) | 0–0 (11–10 p) | FC Bressans (9) |
| 89. | Association des Portugais d'Oyonnax (11) | 2–2 (7–8 p) | Bourg Sud (9) |
| 90. | CSJ Châtillonnaise (11) | 1–3 | US Replonges (10) |
| 91. | AS Chaveyriat-Chanoz (12) | 0–1 | Valserine FC (10) |
| 92. | ES Revermontoise (9) | 2–0 | Saint-Denis-Ambutrix FC (10) |
| 93. | CO Plateau (12) | 0–7 | US Culoz Grand Colombier (10) |
| 94. | ES Val de Saône (10) | 0–5 | CS Lagnieu (8) |
| 95. | Entente Saint-Martin-du-Frêne/Maillat/Combe du Val (10) | 1–0 | FC Manziat (10) |
| 96. | Olympique Rives de l'Ain-Pays du Cerdon (9) | 2–2 (5–6 p) | FC Veyle Sâone (8) |
| 97. | US Plaine de l'Ain (11) | 2–4 | FC Plaine Tonique (9) |
| 98. | US Veyziat (11) | 2–3 | US Nantua (10) |
| 99. | FC Côtière-Luenaz (10) | 4–2 | Plaine Revermont Foot (10) |
| 100. | US Vaux-en-Bugey (11) | 1–4 | AS Travailleurs Turcs Oyonnax (10) |
| 101. | Bresse Foot 01 (9) | 0–3 | US Feillens (7) |
| 102. | Jassans-Frans Foot (9) | 0–3 | Oyonnax Plastics Vallée FC (7) |
| 103. | ASL Saint-Cassien (9) | 2–6 | MOS Trois Rivières (7) |
| 104. | AS Oyeu Burcin (11) | 2–2 (5–4 p) | USÉ Antonine (11) |
| 105. | AS Saint-Lattier (11) | 1–2 | AS Cessieu (12) |
| 106. | JS Saint-Georgeoise (10) | 0–3 | ES Manival (7) |
| 107. | RC Béligny (10) | 4–2 | US Dombes-Chalamont (11) |
| 108. | FC Franc Lyonnais (11) | 7–2 | Foot Trois Rivières (11) |
| 109. | US Montanay (11) | 2–0 | AS Guéreins-Genouilleux (10) |
| 110. | AS Genay (11) | 1–0 | FC Reneins Vauxonne (11) |
| 111. | FC Saint-Maurice-de-Gourdans (11) | 0–6 | US Millery-Vourles (8) |
| 112. | Olympique Rillieux (9) | 2–2 (3–4 p) | AS Villeurbanne Éveil Lyonnais (8) |
| 113. | FC Colombier-Satolas (8) | 0–4 | FC Saint-Cyr Collonges au Mont d'Or (7) |
| 114. | CAS Cheminots Oullins Lyon (9) | 2–4 | ES Bressane Marboz (7) |
| 115. | CO Saint-Fons (9) | 1–1 (6–7 p) | ES Foissiat-Étrez (8) |
| 116. | ES Genas Azieu (9) | 0–1 | ÉS Liergues (9) |
| 117. | AS Algerienne Villeurbanne (9) | 2–1 | Stade Amplepuisien (8) |
| 118. | Latino AFC Lyon (11) | 4–2 | FC Mont Brouilly (9) |
| 119. | Feyzin Club Belle Étoile (9) | 3–2 | ASM Saint-Pierre-la-Palud (10) |
| 120. | FC Pays de l'Arbresle (9) | 3–0 | Savigny FC (10) |
| 121. | FC Sainte-Foy-lès-Lyon (10) | 3–3 (5–4 p) | US Loire-Saint-Romain (10) |
| 122. | FC Sud Ouest 69 (10) | 3–1 | Éveil de Lyon (10) |
| 123. | ES Saint-Priest (10) | 0–10 | FC Chaponnay-Marennes (8) |
| 124. | CS Ozon (11) | 2–0 | Caluire SC (9) |
| 125. | FC Saint-Romain-de-Popey (10) | 1–3 | Belleville Football Beaujolais (9) |
| 126. | US Côteaux Lyonnais (11) | 1–0 | Rhins Trambouze Foot (11) |
| 127. | Olympique Vaulx-en-Venlin (9) | 1–1 (6–7 p) | FC Val Lyonnais (8) |
| 128. | CS Verpillière (9) | 1–2 | AS Bellecour-Perrache (8) |
| 129. | Haute Brévenne Football (10) | 0–1 | SC Maccabi Lyon (11) |
| 130. | AS Buers Villeurbanne (10) | 5–1 | FC Grigny (10) |
| 131. | AS Toussieu (11) | 3–1 | FC Croix Roussien (11) |
| 132. | JSO Givors (10) | 1–3 | AS Bron Grand Lyon (8) |
| 133. | Ménival FC (9) | 1–2 | Sporting Nord-Isère (8) |
| 134. | Lyon Ouest SC (10) | 0–1 | ÉS Trinité Lyon (8) |
| 135. | AS Sornins Réunis (12) | 1–1 (4–2 p) | AS Saint-Symphorien-de-Lay (11) |
| 136. | Sorbiers-La Talaudière (9) | 1–0 | Olympique Saint-Genis-Laval (7) |
| 137. | Olympique Le Coteau (10) | 0–2 | Domtac FC (7) |
| 138. | FC Saint-Paul-en-Jarez (8) | 0–1 | AS Montchat Lyon (7) |
| 139. | JS Cellieu (9) | 2–4 | FC Lyon (7) |
| 140. | AS Saint-Just-Saint-Rambert (10) | 1–8 | AS Craponne (7) |
| 141. | ES Saint-Christo-Marcenod (9) | 0–3 | ES Veauche (7) |
| 142. | FC Commelle-Vernay (10) | 1–5 | AS Savigneux-Montbrison (7) |
| 143. | Football Mont-Pilat (9) | 0–4 | FC Roche-Saint-Genest (7) |
| 144. | Lignon FC (10) | 2–3 | FCO Firminy-Insersport (7) |
| 145. | Anzieux Foot (9) | 0–1 | US Villars (8) |
| 146. | ES Champdieu-Marcilly (9) | 5–0 | SEL Saint-Priest-en-Jarez (8) |
| 147. | Riorges FC (10) | 0–4 | US Saint-Galmier-Chambœuf (8) |
| 148. | AS Algérienne Chambon-Feugerolles (8) | 1–1 (3–5 p) | Côte Chaude Sportif (7) |
| 149. | FC Ouches (12) | 0–11 | Roannais Foot 42 (7) |
| 150. | AF Pays de Coise (9) | 0–4 | Saint-Chamond Foot (7) |
| 151. | Haut Pilat Interfoot (10) | 2–0 | ES Dyonisienne (11) |
| 152. | FCI Saint-Romain-le-Puy (10) | 2–0 | US Métare Saint-Étienne Sud Est (11) |
| 153. | FC Marcellinois (11) | 3–3 (4–5 p) | US Parigny Saint-Cyr (11) |
| 154. | Toranche FC (11) | 1–0 | FC Montagnes du Matin (10) |
| 155. | Olympique Est Roannais (10) | 1–0 | Olympique Saint-Étienne (11) |
| 156. | ÉS Montrondaise (11) | 0–1 | Avenir Côte Foot (10) |
| 157. | FC Loire Sornin (10) | 2–3 | AS Châteauneuf (10) |
| 158. | US Filerin (11) | 1–8 | US Bussières (10) |
| 159. | AS Villers (12) | 1–3 | FC Boisset-Chalain (10) |
| 160. | Sury SC (11) | 2–2 (4–2 p) | AS Astrée (12) |
| 161. | Saint-Étienne UC Terrenoire (11) | 5–1 | Saint-Romain-les-Atheux Sports (12) |
| 162. | AS Vallée du Doux (11) | 1–5 | FC Péageois (8) |
| 163. | FC Saint-Restitut (12) | 3–3 (4–3 p) | FC Sauzet (12) |
| 164. | AS Coucouron (11) | 7–2 | US Baixoise (12) |
| 165. | FC Turquoise (11) | 0–2 | US Pont-La Roche (11) |
| 166. | AS Roussas-Granges-Gontardes (11) | 2–2 (4–5 p) | US Bas-Vivarais (11) |
| 167. | AS Saint-Uze (12) | 4–2 | ES Nord Drôme (11) |
| 168. | ES Beaumonteleger (10) | 4–1 | FC Muzolais (10) |
| 169. | FC Baume Montségur (12) | 3–6 | US Vallée du Jabron (11) |
| 170. | FC Bourguisan (10) | 1–0 | FC Châtelet (10) |
| 171. | AS Cornas (10) | 1–1 (4–3 p) | FC Hauterive (10) |
| 172. | AS Roiffieux (11) | 6–3 | ÉS Saint-Jeure-d'Ay-Marsan (12) |
| 173. | US Rochemaure (11) | 4–1 | US Lussas (11) |
| 174. | IF Barbières-Bésayes-Rochefort-Samson-Marches (11) | 2–1 | AS Homenetmen Bourg-lès Valence (11) |
| 175. | US Montélier (11) | 0–0 (4–2 p) | US Ancône (11) |
| 176. | JS Livron (12) | 0–2 | FC Rochegudien (11) |
| 177. | AS Dolon (11) | 1–2 | US Portes Hautes Cévennes (9) |
| 178. | ES Malissardoise (12) | 0–3 | PS Romanaise (8) |
| 179. | AS Saint-Barthélemy-Grozon (12) | 5–1 | ES Le Laris-Montchenu (13) |
| 180. | FC Bren (11) | 0–0 (2–4 p) | AS Génissieux (12) |
| 181. | FC Berzème (12) | 0–3 | CO Donzère (10) |
| 182. | FC Montélimar (10) | 9–1 | US Saint-Gervais-sur-Roubion (11) |
| 183. | Entente Sarras Sports Saint-Vallier (10) | 2–6 | AS Sud Ardèche (7) |
| 184. | RC Mauves (10) | 0–4 | Entente Crest-Aouste (7) |
| 185. | FC Bourg-lès-Valence (10) | 1–3 | FC Chabeuil (7) |
| 186. | Espérance Hostunoise (10) | 1–2 | FC Valdaine (7) |
| 187. | Olympique Centre Ardèche (9) | 0–1 | ASF Pierrelatte (8) |
| 188. | FC Eyrieux Embroye (8) | 2–0 | AS Donatienne (8) |
| 189. | CS Châteauneuf-de-Galaure (12) | 0–6 | AS Véore Montoison (9) |
| 190. | US Saint-Just-Saint-Marcel (10) | 1–1 (3–5 p) | Rhône Crussol Foot 07 (8) |
| 191. | CO Châteauneuvois (10) | 1–6 | FC Annonay (8) |
| 192. | US Montgasconnaise (11) | 3–0 | CS Faramans (11) |
| 193. | Saint-Martin-d'Hères FC (9) | 2–6 | AS Domarin (8) |
| 194. | Deux Rochers FC (11) | 1–2 | FC Seyssins (9) |
| 195. | Stade Chabonnais (11) | 2–1 | AS Vézeronce-Huert (9) |
| 196. | Crémieu FC (12) | 0–3 | Chaleyssin-Valencin-Luxinay 38 FC (10) |
| 197. | RC Bouvesse (12) | 0–4 | AL Saint-Maurice-l'Exil (9) |
| 198. | US Ruy Montceau (9) | 1–5 | FC Varèze (8) |
| 199. | US Corbelin (10) | 0–3 | Olympique Nord Dauphiné (8) |
| 200. | Artas Charantonnay FC (10) | 0–3 | OC Eybens (8) |
| 201. | US Abbaye (12) | 2–2 (4–3 p) | AS Italienne Européenne Grenoble (10) |
| 202. | Moirans FC (11) | 0–3 | FC Charvieu-Chavagneux (8) |
| 203. | FC Crolles-Bernin (8) | 7–1 | US Creys-Morestel (9) |
| 204. | US Dolomoise (10) | 3–4 | US La Murette (8) |
| 205. | Rives SF (9) | 1–2 | AS Chavanay (7) |
| 206. | FC Tignieu-Jameyzieu (11) | 0–2 | Football Côte Saint-André (7) |
| 207. | Beaucroissant FC (11) | 3–1 | US Le Bouchage (12) |
| 208. | US Saint-Geoire-en-Valdaine (12) | 2–3 | US Village Olympique Grenoble (10) |
| 209. | Vourey Sports (12) | 1–1 (3–5 p) | FC Lauzes (10) |
| 210. | CF Estrablin (9) | 2–4 | Sud Lyonnais Foot (7) |
| 211. | FC Sud Isère (10) | 1–1 (4–3 p) | US Gières (8) |
| 212. | Formafoot Bièvre Valloire (9) | 3–2 | ES Rachais (8) |
| 213. | US Modane (10) | 1–6 | CA Maurienne (8) |
| 214. | FC Laissaud (10) | 1–2 | ES Drumettaz-Mouxy (8) |
| 215. | AS Mont Jovet Bozel (11) | 0–5 | ES Tarentaise (7) |
| 216. | CA Yennne (11) | 3–2 | Montmélian AF (9) |
| 217. | Cœur de Savoie (10) | 3–2 | Cognin Sports (9) |
| 218. | FC Saint-Michel Sports (11) | 0–3 | FC Belle Étoile Mercury (9) |
| 219. | US La Ravoire (10) | 2–2 (2–4 p) | Nivolet FC (8) |
| 220. | FC Apremont (12) | 0–5 | FC Haute Tarentaise (9) |
| 221. | US Chartreuse Guiers (9) | 2–3 | FC Chambotte (8) |
| 222. | US Motteraine (8) | 4–0 | JS Chambéry (7) |
| 223. | ES Seynod (9) | 4–1 | FC Cruseilles (8) |
| 224. | FC Thônes (9) | 0–4 | US Pringy (8) |
| 225. | AS Sillingy (9) | 3–2 | US Annecy-le-Vieux (7) |
| 226. | ES Valleiry (11) | 0–0 (3–2 p) | ES Chilly (7) |
| 227. | CO Chavanod (10) | 2–1 | US Divonne (8) |
| 228. | JS Reignier (9) | 4–3 | Pays de Gex FC (8) |
| 229. | ES Saint-Jeoire-La Tour (10) | 2–0 | SC Morzine Vallée d'Aulps (10) |
| 230. | ES Fillinges (10) | 2–3 | US Margencel (11) |
| 231. | SS Allinges (9) | 2–1 | FC Ballaison (9) |
| 232. | ES Lanfonnet (11) | 1–1 (0–3 p) | US Argonay (9) |
| 233. | AS Prévessin-Moëns (11) | 4–6 | US Vétraz-Monthoux (12) |
| 234. | AS Le Lyaud-Armoy (10) | 1–0 | CS Veigy-Foncenex (11) |
| 235. | ES Meythet (11) | 0–2 | ES Cernex (10) |
| 236. | FC Cluses (10) | 2–2 (1–3 p) | CA Bonnevillois 1921 (11) |
| 237. | AS Portugais Annecy (12) | 0–2 | CS La Balme-de-Sillingy (10) |
| 238. | AS Thonon (12) | 2–5 | AJ Ville-la-Grand (10) |
| 239. | AS Portugais Faverges (11) | 4–3 | CS Saint-Pierre (11) |
| 240. | AS Châteaugay (13) | 1–4 | ES Volcans Malauzat (11) |
| 241. | FC Feu Vert Saint-Chamond (11) | 1–1 (3–2 p) | GS Dervaux Chambon-Feugerolles (9) |
| 242. | Clermont Métropole FC (9) | 1–4 | US Les Martres-de-Veyre (7) |
| 243. | FC Allobroges Asafia (9) | 0–3 (Note: Original match on 3 September 2022 was abandoned due to floodlight failure. It was replayed on 10 September 2022.) | FC La Tour-Saint-Clair (7) |

=== Third round ===
These matches were played on 10, 11 and 18 September 2022.

Third round results: Auvergne-Rhône-Alpes
| Tie no | Home team (tier) | Score | Away team (tier) |
|---|---|---|---|
| 1. | FC Junhac-Montsalvy (10) | 1–1 (3–4 p) | US Brioude (7) |
| 2. | Entente Nord Lozère (7) | 4–0 | ES Riomois-Condat (8) |
| 3. | ES Vebret-Ydes (10) | 1–3 | US Saint-Flour (6) |
| 4. | ES Couze Pavin (11) | 3–0 | Carladez-Goul Sportif (9) |
| 5. | Parlan-Le Rouget FC (9) | 3–1 | US Orcet (8) |
| 6. | AS Espinat (9) | 0–4 | Montluçon Football (5) |
| 7. | Aurillac FC (6) | 0–0 (3–2 p) | Sporting Chataigneraie Cantal (6) |
| 8. | AS Orcines (9) | 0–2 | Dômes-Sancy Foot (8) |
| 9. | FC des Quatre Vallées (10) | 1–2 | Ytrac Foot (7) |
| 10. | FC Artense (10) | 1–2 | EFC Saint-Amant-Tallende (8) |
| 11. | Sud Cantal Foot (9) | 1–2 | US Vallée de l'Authre (7) |
| 12. | CS Saint-Bonnet-près-Riom (10) | 0–6 | US Mozac (8) |
| 13. | JS Saint-Priest-des-Champs (9) | 1–2 | AS Saint-Jacques (6) |
| 14. | FC Saint-Julien-de-Coppel (10) | 2–4 | US Beaumontoise (7) |
| 15. | FC Thiers Auvergne (10) | 2–1 | FC Lezoux (9) |
| 16. | AS Moissat (9) | 0–3 | US Feurs (5) |
| 17. | ES Volcans Malauzat (11) | 0–8 | RC Charbonnières-Paugnat (10) |
| 18. | US Saint-Beauzire (8) | 1–2 | CS Volvic (6) |
| 19. | US Issoire (7) | 4–0 | FA Le Cendre (6) |
| 20. | FCUS Ambert (8) | 0–8 | SA Thiers (6) |
| 21. | Aulnat Sportif (11) | 1–5 | AS Saint-Genès-Champanelle (8) |
| 22. | Ecureuils Franc Rosier (9) | 0–7 | FC Riom (6) |
| 23. | FC Blanzat (9) | 2–3 | US Les Martres-de-Veyre (7) |
| 24. | US Courpière (9) | 0–4 | FC Cournon-d'Auvergne (7) |
| 25. | AS Grazac-Lapte (9) | 0–9 | FC Espaly (6) |
| 26. | FC Feu Vert Saint-Chamond (11) | 0–11 | US Monistrol (7) |
| 27. | US Sucs et Lignon (7) | 2–1 | AS Chadrac (8) |
| 28. | AS Saint-Didier-Saint-Just (8) | 0–1 | Sorbiers-La Talaudière (9) |
| 29. | SC Langogne (8) | 2–1 | US Blavozy (6) |
| 30. | Haut Lignon Football (10) | 2–2 (3–4 p) | AS Loudes (8) |
| 31. | Avenir Côte Foot (10) | 3–2 | US Montfaucon Montregard Raucoules (10) |
| 32. | AS Cheminots Langeac (9) | 0–5 | Hauts Lyonnais (5) |
| 33. | AS Emblavez-Vorey (7) | 1–4 | Velay FC (6) |
| 34. | US Vals Le Puy (9) | 1–0 | Sauveteurs Brivois (8) |
| 35. | Olympique Est Roannais (10) | 1–2 | US Bassin Minier (9) |
| 36. | OC Monetay-sur-Allier (11) | 1–1 (7–6 p) | Entente Lurcy-Lévis/Cérilly (10) |
| 37. | US Lignerolles-Lavault Sainte-Anne Prémilhat (8) | 0–5 | AA Lapalisse (6) |
| 38. | ES Montagne Bourbonnaise (11) | 2–0 | SCA Cussét (7) |
| 39. | FC Châtel-Guyon (7) | 2–1 | Bézenet-Doyet Foot (8) |
| 40. | Cébazat Sports (7) | 1–1 (4–2 p) | US Vendat Bellerive Brugheas (8) |
| 41. | Étoile Moulins Yzeure (9) | 0–5 | AS Domérat (5) |
| 42. | US Bien-Assis (10) | 2–3 | AC Creuzier-le-Vieux (8) |
| 43. | FC Haut d'Allier (10) | 2–0 | FC Souvigny (9) |
| 44. | RC Vichy (6) | 1–1 (2–4 p) | AS Moulins (6) |
| 45. | Commentry FC (8) | 3–0 | AS Varennes-sur-Allier (9) |
| 46. | AS Nord Vignoble (9) | 1–1 (3–4 p) | Stade Saint-Yorre (9) |
| 47. | AS Espinasse-Vozelle (13) | 1–9 | SC Avermes (9) |
| 48. | AS Travailleurs Turcs Oyonnax (10) | 2–0 | AG Bons-en-Chablais (10) |
| 49. | US Culoz Grand Colombier (10) | 1–1 (5–6 p) | US Argonay (9) |
| 50. | ES Valleiry (11) | 1–0 | AS Portugais Faverges (11) |
| 51. | Cluses-Scionzier FC (6) | 1–1 (3–4 p) (Note: Tie reversed from original draw.) | JS Reignier (9) |
| 52. | US Pringy (8) | 2–3 | FC Foron (8) |
| 53. | US Margencel (11) | 1–4 | CSA Poisy (10) |
| 54. | Oyonnax Plastics Vallée FC (7) | 0–5 | GFA Rumilly-Vallières (5) |
| 55. | ES Cernex (10) | 1–5 | AS Montréal-la-Cluse (8) |
| 56. | Valserine FC (10) | 0–4 | US Feillens (7) |
| 57. | FC Chambotte (8) | 1–1 (4–3 p) | US Mont Blanc (8) |
| 58. | ES Saint-Jeoire-La Tour (10) | 5–4 | SS Allinges (9) |
| 59. | CA Bonnevillois 1921 (11) | 4–0 | US Vétraz-Monthoux (12) |
| 60. | US Annemasse-Ambilly-Gaillard (9) | 8–0 | US Replonges (10) |
| 61. | US Grignon (10) | 0–6 | Aix-les-Bains FC (5) |
| 62. | Entente Saint-Martin-du-Frêne/Maillat/Combe du Val (10) | 0–3 | CS Lagnieu (8) |
| 63. | US Montgasconnaise (11) | 0–5 | ES Revermontoise (9) |
| 64. | AJ Ville-la-Grand (10) | 2–3 | FC Veyle Sâone (8) |
| 65. | US Abbaye (12) | 1–3 | ES Foissiat-Étrez (8) |
| 66. | US Nantua (10) | 4–2 | CA Maurienne (8) |
| 67. | AS Sillingy (9) | 2–0 | AS Le Lyaud-Armoy (10) |
| 68. | CO Chavanod (10) | 0–4 | ES Drumettaz-Mouxy (8) |
| 69. | FC Plaine Tonique (9) | 6–1 | ES Seynod (9) |
| 70. | FC Saint-Cyr Collonges au Mont d'Or (7) | 2–1 | Nivolet FC (8) |
| 71. | CA Yennne (11) | 2–2 (4–3 p) | AS Oyeu Burcin (11) |
| 72. | ES Bressane Marboz (7) | 1–3 | AS Misérieux-Trévoux (6) |
| 73. | FC Haute Tarentaise (9) | 2–2 (4–5 p) | ES Tarentaise (7) |
| 74. | CS La Balme-de-Sillingy (10) | 0–1 | US Motteraine (8) |
| 75. | AS Cessieu (12) | 0–3 | ES Veauche (7) |
| 76. | FC Belle Étoile Mercury (9) | 2–0 | Cœur de Savoie (10) |
| 77. | ES Manival (7) | 2–0 | CS Viriat (8) |
| 78. | Sury SC (11) | 1–5 | Domtac FC (7) |
| 79. | FCI Saint-Romain-le-Puy (10) | 2–4 | FC Charvieu-Chavagneux (8) |
| 80. | US Côteaux Lyonnais (11) | 0–4 | Belleville Football Beaujolais (9) |
| 81. | AS Sornins Réunis (12) | 0–2 | Chambéry SF (5) |
| 82. | FC Franc Lyonnais (11) | 2–4 | US Saint-Galmier-Chambœuf (8) |
| 83. | FC Pays de l'Arbresle (9) | 3–5 | Vénissieux FC (6) |
| 84. | Bourg Sud (9) | 4–0 | US Bussières (10) |
| 85. | Latino AFC Lyon (11) | 0–2 | Ain Sud (5) |
| 86. | AS Châteauneuf (10) | 6–3 | RC Béligny (10) |
| 87. | AS Villeurbanne Éveil Lyonnais (8) | 0–0 (6–7 p) | SO Pont-de-Chéruy-Chavanoz (8) |
| 88. | ES Champdieu-Marcilly (9) | 2–1 | CS Neuville (7) |
| 89. | SC Maccabi Lyon (11) | 1–2 | FC Roche-Saint-Genest (7) |
| 90. | FC Boisset-Chalain (10) | 1–4 | Haut Pilat Interfoot (10) |
| 91. | Toranche FC (11) | 0–2 | FC Chaponnay-Marennes (8) |
| 92. | ÉS Liergues (9) | 1–1 (3–4 p) | AS Savigneux-Montbrison (7) |
| 93. | US Parigny Saint-Cyr (11) | 1–5 | Olympique Nord Dauphiné (8) |
| 94. | Saint-Étienne UC Terrenoire (11) | 1–9 | US Villars (8) |
| 95. | US Montanay (11) | 5–1 | Olympique Belleroche Villefranche (8) |
| 96. | FCO Firminy-Insersport (7) | 0–0 (4–3 p) | AS Craponne (7) |
| 97. | Roannais Foot 42 (7) | 2–2 (4–3 p) | AS Bellecour-Perrache (8) |
| 98. | FC Gerland Lyon (10) | 5–0 | FC Balmes Nord-Isère (10) |
| 99. | CS Ozon (11) | 0–2 | AS Domarin (8) |
| 100. | AS Algerienne Villeurbanne (9) | 2–1 | FC Sud Ouest 69 (10) |
| 101. | FC Côtière-Luenaz (10) | 0–1 | L'Étrat-La Tour Sportif (7) |
| 102. | US Village Olympique Grenoble (10) | 4–7 | AC Seyssinet (6) |
| 103. | Sporting Nord-Isère (8) | 3–0 | FC Seyssins (9) |
| 104. | AS Buers Villeurbanne (10) | 2–2 (4–3 p) | Formafoot Bièvre Valloire (9) |
| 105. | AS Toussieu (11) | 1–0 | US La Murette (8) |
| 106. | FC Sainte-Foy-lès-Lyon (10) | 1–4 | Côte Chaude Sportif (7) |
| 107. | Beaucroissant FC (11) | 1–2 | AS Bron Grand Lyon (8) |
| 108. | FC La Tour-Saint-Clair (7) | 5–1 | Football Côte Saint-André (7) |
| 109. | FC Lauzes (10) | 0–2 | FC Échirolles (6) |
| 110. | FC Sud Isère (10) | 0–6 | FC Lyon (7) |
| 111. | FC Vallée de la Gresse (8) | 0–4 | UGA Lyon-Décines (8) |
| 112. | AS Montchat Lyon (7) | 2–3 | FC Bourgoin-Jallieu (5) |
| 113. | Stade Chabonnais (11) | 1–2 | AS Genay (11) |
| 114. | US Pont-La Roche (11) | 4–0 | US Vallée du Jabron (11) |
| 115. | OC Eybens (8) | 0–1 | Entente Crest-Aouste (7) |
| 116. | AS Véore Montoison (9) | 0–1 | FC Limonest Dardilly Saint-Didier (5) |
| 117. | AS Roiffieux (11) | 2–0 | FC Bourguisan (10) |
| 118. | AS Cornas (10) | 0–3 | Olympique de Valence (6) |
| 119. | AS Saint-Barthélemy-Grozon (12) | 1–6 | AJA Villeneuve (9) |
| 120. | AS Génissieux (12) | 3–3 (5–3 p) | US Montélier (11) |
| 121. | ÉS Trinité Lyon (8) | 3–3 (4–3 p) | US Davézieux-Vidalon (9) |
| 122. | FC Eyrieux Embroye (8) | 1–0 | Chassieu Décines FC (6) |
| 123. | ES Beaumonteleger (10) | 1–1 (4–2 p) | US Millery-Vourles (8) |
| 124. | FC Annonay (8) | 2–0 | FC Crolles-Bernin (8) |
| 125. | US Bas-Vivarais (11) | 0–4 | Saint-Chamond Foot (7) |
| 126. | Chaleyssin-Valencin-Luxinay 38 FC (10) | 0–2 | AS Chavanay (7) |
| 127. | IF Barbières-Bésayes-Rochefort-Samson-Marches (11) | 0–4 | FC Chabeuil (7) |
| 128. | US Rochemaure (11) | 0–2 | Rhône Crussol Foot 07 (8) |
| 129. | RC Savasson (12) | 0–5 | FC Valdaine (7) |
| 130. | FC Varèze (8) | 1–1 (3–4 p) | FC Rhône Vallées (6) |
| 131. | AL Saint-Maurice-l'Exil (9) | 2–1 | FC Montélimar (10) |
| 132. | FC Val Lyonnais (8) | 4–1 | US Portes Hautes Cévennes (9) |
| 133. | AS Sud Ardèche (7) | 1–3 | FC Vaulx-en-Velin (5) |
| 134. | Sud Lyonnais Foot (7) | 7–0 | ASF Pierrelatte (8) |
| 135. | FC Rochegudien (11) | 1–0 | Olympique Salaise Rhodia (6) |
| 136. | CO Donzère (10) | 2–3 | FC Péageois (8) |
| 137. | AS Coucouron (11) | 1–4 | Feyzin Club Belle Étoile (9) |
| 138. | PS Romanaise (8) | 2–2 (3–2 p) | MOS Trois Rivières (7) |
| 139. | AS Saint-Uze (12) | 6–2 | FC Saint-Restitut (12) |

=== Fourth round ===
These matches were played on 24 and 25 September 2022.

Fourth round results: Auvergne-Rhône-Alpes
| Tie no | Home team (tier) | Score | Away team (tier) |
|---|---|---|---|
| 1. | US Vallée de l'Authre (7) | 1–2 | US Brioude (7) |
| 2. | US Les Martres-de-Veyre (7) | 1–3 | US Issoire (7) |
| 3. | Dômes-Sancy Foot (8) | 0–2 | Aurillac FC (6) |
| 4. | EFC Saint-Amant-Tallende (8) | 1–2 | AS Saint-Jacques (6) |
| 5. | ES Couze Pavin (11) | 0–6 | AS Domérat (5) |
| 6. | AS Loudes (8) | 3–7 | US Saint-Flour (6) |
| 7. | US Bassin Minier (9) | 1–4 | Entente Nord Lozère (7) |
| 8. | Parlan-Le Rouget FC (9) | 2–1 | Ytrac Foot (7) |
| 9. | US Beaumontoise (7) | 0–1 | FC Chamalières (4) |
| 10. | FC Haut d'Allier (10) | 4–0 | OC Monetay-sur-Allier (11) |
| 11. | ES Montagne Bourbonnaise (11) | 3–2 | AC Creuzier-le-Vieux (8) |
| 12. | FC Thiers Auvergne (10) | 0–2 | Montluçon Football (5) |
| 13. | FC Cournon-d'Auvergne (7) | 4–1 | AA Lapalisse (6) |
| 14. | FC Riom (6) | 1–2 | Moulins Yzeure Foot (4) |
| 15. | AS Saint-Genès-Champanelle (8) | 0–2 | CS Volvic (6) |
| 16. | Commentry FC (8) | 0–0 (2–4 p) | AS Moulins (6) |
| 17. | Stade Saint-Yorre (9) | 0–0 (3–4 p) | SC Avermes (9) |
| 18. | US Mozac (8) | 3–0 | Cébazat Sports (7) |
| 19. | Roannais Foot 42 (7) | 3–2 | FC Châtel-Guyon (7) |
| 20. | SC Langogne (8) | 1–2 | US Feurs (5) |
| 21. | ES Veauche (7) | 5–2 | US Villars (8) |
| 22. | Haut Pilat Interfoot (10) | 0–3 | Andrézieux-Bouthéon FC (4) |
| 23. | L'Étrat-La Tour Sportif (7) | 0–1 | Velay FC (6) |
| 24. | Sorbiers-La Talaudière (9) | 3–2 | US Sucs et Lignon (7) |
| 25. | RC Charbonnières-Paugnat (10) | 1–6 | SA Thiers (6) |
| 26. | FC Roche-Saint-Genest (7) | 2–2 (5–3 p) | FC Annonay (8) |
| 27. | US Vals Le Puy (9) | 1–2 | FC Espaly (6) |
| 28. | US Saint-Galmier-Chambœuf (8) | 6–1 | US Monistrol (7) |
| 29. | JS Reignier (9) | 1–1 (3–4 p) | FC Belle Étoile Mercury (9) |
| 30. | CA Bonnevillois 1921 (11) | 0–6 | Aix-les-Bains FC (5) |
| 31. | FC Lyon (7) | 3–1 | ES Manival (7) |
| 32. | US Annemasse-Ambilly-Gaillard (9) | 3–3 (3–4 p) | AS Sillingy (9) |
| 33. | AS Domarin (8) | 0–4 | GFA Rumilly-Vallières (5) |
| 34. | CA Yennne (11) | 0–5 | ES Tarentaise (7) |
| 35. | US Argonay (9) | 2–0 | FC Chambotte (8) |
| 36. | CSA Poisy (10) | 1–0 | ES Saint-Jeoire-La Tour (10) |
| 37. | ES Drumettaz-Mouxy (8) | 0–2 | FC Foron (8) |
| 38. | CS Lagnieu (8) | 0–4 | Thonon Evian Grand Genève FC (4) |
| 39. | FC Échirolles (6) | 0–2 (Note: Tie reversed from original draw.) | FC La Tour-Saint-Clair (7) |
| 40. | US Nantua (10) | 0–5 | ÉS Trinité Lyon (8) |
| 41. | AS Savigneux-Montbrison (7) | 1–0 | AS Chavanay (7) |
| 42. | AS Genay (11) | 0–3 | US Feillens (7) |
| 43. | AS Montréal-la-Cluse (8) | 2–2 (5–3 p) | ES Champdieu-Marcilly (9) |
| 44. | Belleville Football Beaujolais (9) | 0–12 | GOAL FC (4) |
| 45. | SO Pont-de-Chéruy-Chavanoz (8) | 3–2 | US Motteraine (8) |
| 46. | Domtac FC (7) | 0–1 | Hauts Lyonnais (5) |
| 47. | AS Travailleurs Turcs Oyonnax (10) | 0–6 | AC Seyssinet (6) |
| 48. | AJA Villeneuve (9) | 0–6 | Chambéry SF (5) |
| 49. | ES Valleiry (11) | 2–2 (6–5 p) | FC Charvieu-Chavagneux (8) |
| 50. | UGA Lyon-Décines (8) | 3–1 | Sporting Nord-Isère (8) |
| 51. | US Montanay (11) | 1–2 | Ain Sud (5) |
| 52. | Olympique de Valence (6) | 0–1 | FC Saint-Cyr Collonges au Mont d'Or (7) |
| 53. | AS Bron Grand Lyon (8) | 1–3 | ES Foissiat-Étrez (8) |
| 54. | FC Plaine Tonique (9) | 0–0 (4–5 p) | Saint-Chamond Foot (7) |
| 55. | FCO Firminy-Insersport (7) | 0–2 | Lyon La Duchère (4) |
| 56. | Avenir Côte Foot (10) | 2–1 | FC Eyrieux Embroye (8) |
| 57. | AS Génissieux (12) | 0–8 | FC Limonest Dardilly Saint-Didier (5) |
| 58. | AS Buers Villeurbanne (10) | 1–1 (3–2 p) | Bourg Sud (9) |
| 59. | AS Roiffieux (11) | 2–1 | FC Val Lyonnais (8) |
| 60. | AS Toussieu (11) | 0–2 | Vénissieux FC (6) |
| 61. | ES Revermontoise (9) | 0–1 | FC Veyle Sâone (8) |
| 62. | AS Châteauneuf (10) | 0–6 | FC Chabeuil (7) |
| 63. | FC Valdaine (7) | 1–1 (4–5 p) | FC Vaulx-en-Velin (5) |
| 64. | AL Saint-Maurice-l'Exil (9) | 0–3 | AS Saint-Priest (4) |
| 65. | FC Péageois (8) | 2–3 | FC Rhône Vallées (6) |
| 66. | FC Rochegudien (11) | 1–2 | ES Beaumonteleger (10) |
| 67. | Côte Chaude Sportif (7) | 2–2 (2–4 p) | Sud Lyonnais Foot (7) |
| 68. | Olympique Nord Dauphiné (8) | 1–1 (5–4 p) | AS Misérieux-Trévoux (6) |
| 69. | Entente Crest-Aouste (7) | 2–0 | PS Romanaise (8) |
| 70. | AS Saint-Uze (12) | 0–8 | FC Chaponnay-Marennes (8) |
| 71. | Feyzin Club Belle Étoile (9) | 0–1 | FC Gerland Lyon (10) |
| 72. | Rhône Crussol Foot 07 (8) | 1–2 | FC Bourgoin-Jallieu (5) |
| 73. | US Pont-La Roche (11) | 1–1 (7–6 p) | AS Algerienne Villeurbanne (9) |

=== Fifth round ===
These matches were played on 8 and 9 October 2022, with one replayed on 22 October 2022.

Fifth round results: Auvergne-Rhône-Alpes
| Tie no | Home team (tier) | Score | Away team (tier) |
|---|---|---|---|
| 1. | US Saint-Flour (6) | 0–1 | AS Savigneux-Montbrison (7) |
| 2. | CS Volvic (6) | 3–3 (4–2 p) | Roannais Foot 42 (7) |
| 3. | US Issoire (7) | 2–0 | US Mozac (8) |
| 4. | Montluçon Football (5) | 0–7 | Le Puy Foot 43 Auvergne (3) |
| 5. | AS Saint-Jacques (6) | 0–4 | FC Chamalières (4) |
| 6. | UGA Lyon-Décines (8) | 0–3 | Aurillac FC (6) |
| 7. | ES Montagne Bourbonnaise (11) | 0–5 | SA Thiers (6) |
| 8. | SC Avermes (9) | 0–3 | Avenir Côte Foot (10) |
| 9. | Moulins Yzeure Foot (4) | 1–1 (6–5 p) | AS Domérat (5) |
| 10. | US Brioude (7) | 1–1 (1–3 p) | FC Cournon-d'Auvergne (7) |
| 11. | Parlan-Le Rouget FC (9) | 5–0 | FC Haut d'Allier (10) |
| 12. | FC Roche-Saint-Genest (7) | 1–0 | US Saint-Galmier-Chambœuf (8) |
| 13. | AS Moulins (6) | 1–3 | US Feurs (5) |
| 14. | Sorbiers-La Talaudière (9) | 0–2 | Entente Nord Lozère (7) |
| 15. | FC Saint-Cyr Collonges au Mont d'Or (7) | 0–1 | FC Limonest Dardilly Saint-Didier (5) |
| 16. | FC Belle Étoile Mercury (9) | 1–2 | FC Chabeuil (7) |
| 17. | ÉS Trinité Lyon (8) | 0–5 | Chambéry SF (5) |
| 18. | FC Espaly (6) | 2–3 | GOAL FC (4) |
| 19. | ES Beaumonteleger (10) | 5–4 | US Pont-La Roche (11) |
| 20. | Saint-Chamond Foot (7) | 1–3 | Andrézieux-Bouthéon FC (4) |
| 21. | FC Rhône Vallées (6) | 4–1 (Note: The original match ended 3–2, but on 10 October 2022 Entente Crest-Aouste submitted a challenge over the qualification of two FC Rhône Vallées players. The league ruled that the game should be replayed.) | Entente Crest-Aouste (7) |
| 22. | FC Chaponnay-Marennes (8) | 0–2 | FC Villefranche Beaujolais (3) |
| 23. | SO Pont-de-Chéruy-Chavanoz (8) | 2–2 (14–15 p) | AS Saint-Priest (4) |
| 24. | Sud Lyonnais Foot (7) | 3–2 | Hauts Lyonnais (5) |
| 25. | Olympique Nord Dauphiné (8) | 2–3 | Velay FC (6) |
| 26. | AS Roiffieux (11) | 3–3 (5–4 p) | AS Buers Villeurbanne (10) |
| 27. | FC Foron (8) | 2–3 | Ain Sud (5) |
| 28. | CSA Poisy (10) | 1–3 | Vénissieux FC (6) |
| 29. | US Feillens (7) | 1–2 | GFA Rumilly-Vallières (5) |
| 30. | FC Gerland Lyon (10) | 4–0 | ES Valleiry (11) |
| 31. | FC La Tour-Saint-Clair (7) | 0–0 (5–4 p) | ES Veauche (7) |
| 32. | US Argonay (9) | 2–3 | ES Tarentaise (7) |
| 33. | ES Foissiat-Étrez (8) | 2–6 | FC Lyon (7) |
| 34. | FC Veyle Sâone (8) | 1–2 | FC Bourgoin-Jallieu (5) |
| 35. | AC Seyssinet (6) | 1–1 (6–7 p) | Lyon La Duchère (4) |
| 36. | AS Sillingy (9) | 1–4 | Thonon Evian Grand Genève FC (4) |
| 37. | AS Montréal-la-Cluse (8) | 1–1 (5–6 p) | FC Vaulx-en-Velin (5) |
| 38. | Aix-les-Bains FC (5) | 1–2 | Football Bourg-en-Bresse Péronnas 01 (3) |

=== Sixth round ===
These matches were played on 15, 16 and 29 October 2022.

Sixth round results: Auvergne-Rhône-Alpes
| Tie no | Home team (tier) | Score | Away team (tier) |
|---|---|---|---|
| 1. | AS Savigneux-Montbrison (7) | 2–2 (6–5 p) | CS Volvic (6) |
| 2. | US Issoire (7) | 0–2 | Le Puy Foot 43 Auvergne (3) |
| 3. | Aurillac FC (6) | 1–1 (2–3 p) | FC Chamalières (4) |
| 4. | Avenir Côte Foot (10) | 0–4 | SA Thiers (6) |
| 5. | FC Cournon-d'Auvergne (7) | 1–1 (3–2 p) | Moulins Yzeure Foot (4) |
| 6. | Parlan-Le Rouget FC (9) | 0–3 | FC Roche-Saint-Genest (7) |
| 7. | Entente Nord Lozère (7) | 0–2 | US Feurs (5) |
| 8. | FC Chabeuil (7) | 0–5 | FC Limonest Dardilly Saint-Didier (5) |
| 9. | Chambéry SF (5) | 1–1 (5–4 p) | GOAL FC (4) |
| 10. | ES Beaumonteleger (10) | 1–2 | Andrézieux-Bouthéon FC (4) |
| 11. | FC Rhône Vallées (6) | 2–3 | FC Villefranche Beaujolais (3) |
| 12. | Sud Lyonnais Foot (7) | 0–4 | AS Saint-Priest (4) |
| 13. | AS Roiffieux (11) | 2–7 | Velay FC (6) |
| 14. | Ain Sud (5) | 0–1 | Vénissieux FC (6) |
| 15. | FC Gerland Lyon (10) | 0–2 | GFA Rumilly-Vallières (5) |
| 16. | ES Tarentaise (7) | 1–0 | FC La Tour-Saint-Clair (7) |
| 17. | FC Lyon (7) | 0–1 | FC Bourgoin-Jallieu (5) |
| 18. | Lyon La Duchère (4) | 2–0 | Thonon Evian Grand Genève FC (4) |
| 19. | FC Vaulx-en-Velin (5) | 2–1 | Football Bourg-en-Bresse Péronnas 01 (3) |
