= 2011 Coupe de France final =

Final of the 2010–11 edition of the Coupe de France

- Event: 2010–11 Coupe de France
Paris Saint-Germain	Lille
Ligue 1	Ligue 1
0	1
- Date: 14 May 2011
- Venue: Stade de France, Saint-Denis
- Man of the Match: Ludovic Obraniak
- Referee: Clément Turpin (Bourgogne)
- Attendance: 79,000
- Weather: 15 °C (59 °F), Clear

The 2011 Coupe de France final was the 93rd final of France's most prestigious football cup competition. The final took place on 14 May 2011 at the Stade de France in Saint-Denis and was contested between Paris Saint-Germain and Lille. Paris Saint-Germain were the defending champions of the competition and it was the third time in the club's history that it had appeared in back-to-back finals. The winner of the Coupe de France is guaranteed a place in the playoff round of the UEFA Europa League with the club's appearance being dependent on whether it qualifies for the 2011–12 UEFA Champions League. The final was broadcast live on France 2.

Lille defeated the defending champions Paris Saint-Germain 1–0 in the 2011 Coupe de France Final courtesy of a late second half goal from Ludovic Obraniak to win the Coupe de France title. This was the club's first domestic trophy since winning the Coupe de France 56 years earlier. Later that month, Lille completed the domestic double by winning the Ligue 1 title.

== News ==
=== Team backgrounds ===
Paris Saint-Germain appeared in its 12th Coupe de France final match, second only to Marseille, who have appeared in the final 18 times. The club was the competition's defending champions having defeated Monaco 1–0 courtesy of an extra time goal from Guillaume Hoarau in the 2010 final. Paris Saint-Germain has won the Coupe de France eight times, second in history behind Marseille, and appeared in back-to-back final matches for the third time. The club's first consecutive appearances in the final came in 1982–1983 when it won consecutive cups defeating Saint-Étienne and Nantes, respectively. The second occurrence transpired in 2003–2004 when Les Parisiens lost to Auxerre 2–1 before rebounding the following year defeating second division club Châteauroux 1–0.

Lille made its eighth appearance in the final match of the Coupe de France and its first since 1955. The club's previous seven finals appearance were accumulated through a ten-year period stretching between 1945–1955. In its seven previous finals appearances, Lille won five times, which was tied for fourth-most in the cup's history. The club's last Coupe de France title came in the 1955 final when it defeated Bordeaux 5–2 at the Stade Olympique Yves-du-Manoir in Colombes. Jean Vincent scored the opener and Yvon Douis and Gérard Bourbotte netted two each to give Lille its last major domestic honour.

=== Ticketing ===
The Coupe de France final has been played every year at the Stade de France since 1998, following the stadium's completion. The stadium has a capacity of 81,338 spectators. Each club that participated in the final received the same quota of tickets. The tickets were distributed to the public via each club, as well as the each club's league association. Lille sold its tickets on 27 April at the club's box office at the Stade Lille-Metropole, while Paris Saint-Germain distributed its tickets on the same day at the service area of the Parc des Princes, the club's home stadium. The Ligue Nord-Pas de Calais, whom Lille is representing, and the Ligue de Paris Ile-de-France de Football, whom Paris Saint-Germain is representing, only distributed tickets to local clubs within each league.

=== Officials ===
On 29 April, the French Football Federation announced that referee Clément Turpin of Bourgogne would officiate the 2011 Coupe de France final. Turpin has officiate three matches involving either of the two teams this season. He refereed Lille's 6–3 win over Lorient on 5 December 2010. The scoreline is the highest in Ligue 1 this season. Turpin also officiated Lille's 3–1 win over Montpellier two months prior. For Paris Saint-Germain, Turpin handled the team's 2–1 win over Caen on 20 November. Turpin will be assisted by Cyril Gringore of Lower Normandy and Nicolas Danos of the Midi-Pyrénées. Ruddy Buquet of Picardy will serve as the fourth official.

== Road to the final ==
Paris Saint-Germain			Round	Lille
Opponent	H/A	Result	2010–11 Coupe de France	Opponent	H/A	Result
Lens	H	5–1	Round of 64	Forbach	A	3–1
Agen	A	3–2	Round of 32	Wasquehal	A	1–0
Martigues	A	4–1	Round of 16	Nantes	H	1–1 (a.e.t.) (3–2 pen.)
Le Mans	H	2–1 (a.e.t.)	Quarter-finals	Lorient	H	0–0 (a.e.t.) (5–3 pen.)
Angers	A	3–1	Semi-finals	Nice	A	2–0

=== Paris Saint-Germain ===
Unlike Lille, who opened up the competition against amateur opposition, Paris Saint-Germain faced fellow Ligue 1 outfit Lens at the Parc des Princes. The hosts opened the match by scoring the first five goals. Goals by Zoumana Camara, Nenê, Péguy Luyindula and Guillaume Hoarau, the latter netting two, was enough to allow Paris Saint-Germain progression to the Round of 32. The club's next opponent was amateur club Agen. Due to Agen being two levels below Paris Saint-Germain, the club was designated as the home team. The designation resulted in the location and time of the match becoming the subject of debate for almost an entire week as PSG officials sought to move the match up from 20:45 CET to 18:00 in the afternoon to allow the club enough recovery time for its next match and to also limit possible incidents involving the clubs' supporters. After the French Football Federation ruled in favor of the time change, Paris Saint-Germain began questioning the safety and security of Agen's stadium and requested that the match site be moved to either the Stade Chaban-Delmas in Bordeaux or the Stadium Municipal in Toulouse. Agen officials balked at the idea stating the club's stadium had met all the guidelines and requirements of the federation. Despite appealing for a stadium change, PSG were denied after the federation ruled in favor of Agen on 19 January. In the match, Saint-Germain opened the scoring through midfielder Mathieu Bodmer. Agen, surprisingly, equalized through Mamoudou Daffé just before half-time. Two minutes after the interval, the away side re-took the lead through Luyindula and doubled its lead in the 50th minute after a goal from Hoarau. Despite Agen scoring in the 60th minute to close the lead to a goal, Les Rouge-et-Bleu were able to hold onto the 3–2 victory.

In the Round of 16, Paris Saint-Germain faced another amateur club in Martigues. Similar to the Agen match, PSG were tested after Stéphane Biakolo drew the match at 1–1 just before half-time after Hoarau had opened the scoring early in the first half, however, in the second half, the away side were able to maintain its composure en route to a 4–1 victory with Hoarau scoring two goals, completing his hat trick, and Luyindula adding another. In the quarterfinals, PSG faced Le Mans and endured a dull match with the only highlights of normal time being red cards shown to Camara and opposition defender Mamadou Wague. The match, subsequently, went to extra time scoreless and Paris Saint-Germain were, remarkably, rescued by two of the club's academy players. Seventeen-year-old Jean-Christophe Bahebeck, who had made his professional debut in the Martigues match, opened the scoring in the 108th minute and 18-year-old Neeskens Kebano scored the second goal three minutes from time to give PSG a 2–0 extra time win. In the semi-finals, Paris Saint-Germain faced the last club in the competition that wasn't playing in the first division, Angers. Paris Saint-Germain opened up the scoring in the 22nd minute through Bodmer following service from Nenê on the left side. Six minutes after half-time, Nenê was on the receiving end after scoring a left-footed strike. Angers midfielder Sébastien Renouard scored in the 57th minute to give the home side hope, however, three minutes later, the home team's dreams would be slashed following a goal from Hoarau, the striker's sixth goal in the competition. Paris Saint-Germain held onto the 3–1 scoreline until the death, which secured the club a place in the final match.

=== Lille ===
Lille began its Coupe de France campaign away to amateur club Forbach. The away side opened up the scoring through Eden Hazard in the first half. In the second half, Lille got goals from Aurélien Chedjou and Gervinho before Forbach were handed a consolation goal from Abdelhak Errai in injury time to go home 3–1 losers. In the next round, Lille were pitted against local rivals Wasquehal. Despite Wasquehal being designated hosts for the match, two weeks before it was to take place, it was announced that the match would be played at Lille's ground, the Stade Lille-Metropole, in order to inherit a derby-like atmosphere given the close proximity between each club. Prior to Lille playing in the stadium, from 1995–2005, Wasquehal was its primary tenants. In the match, Lille recorded a 1–0 victory over their rivals thanks to a first half goal from the Brazilian Túlio de Melo. In the ensuing round, Lille was given its first test in the mold of professional club Nantes. Nantes, surprisingly, took the lead through Filip Đorđević in the 19th minute. Just minutes before half-time, however, Hazard equalized for Lille. The match ultimately went to a penalty shootout. In the shootout, misses from striker Moussa Sow and midfielder Florent Balmont for Lille and Omar Benzerga and Vincent Sasso for Nantes resulted in Lille entering the fourth set of shooters up 1–0. After two conversions each from both sides, Nantes midfielder Ronny Rodelin's shot was saved by goalkeeper Mickaël Landreau to allow Lille progression to the next round.

In the quarter-finals, Lille faced fellow first division club Lorient at home. The match was closely contested and, despite Lorient playing with ten men for over an hour due to Bruno Ecuele Manga being sent off, both Lille and Lorient failed to get on the scoresheet, which resulted in a penalty shootout for the hosts for the second consecutive round. Unlike the previous shootout against Nantes, Lille converted all of its chances. An Arnold Mvuemba miss on Lorient's third shot gave Lille the advantage and, after Ludovic Obraniak converted his fourth shot for Lille, Hazard stepped up and converted his to send Lille to its first Coupe de France semi-final in over 25 years. In the semi-finals, Lille traveled down south to the Provence-Alpes-Côte d'Azur region to face Nice. In the match, both teams failed to test each opposition's goalkeeper. Towards the end of the half, Lille were finally rewarding courtesy of an Hazard goal following a successful link up between the winger and midfielder Obraniak. Just minutes after half-time, Lille extended its lead through Gervinho. The away side has numerous opportunities to extend its lead, but each opportunity was either stymied by the opposition or wasted. Lille were still able to hold on to its 2–0 lead, which would be the final scoreline allowing the club to progress to its first Coupe de France final since 1955.

== Match ==
=== Pre-match ===
The opening kick-off was done by former French international and 1998 FIFA World Cup-winning goalkeeper Bernard Lama. During his professional career, Lama played for both Lille and Paris Saint-Germain and had arguably the best years with both clubs. He began his football career with Lille amassing over 100 appearances from 1981–1989. In 1992, Lama joined Paris Saint-Germain. With Les Parisiens, he spent six years with the club appearing in over 230 matches winning two Coupe de France titles in 1993 and 1995.

=== Match details ===
14 May 2011
20:45 CEST

Paris Saint-Germain	0–1	Lille
	Report	Obraniak 89'

Stade de France, Saint-Denis
Attendance: 79,000
Referee: Clément Turpin (Bourgogne)

Paris Saint-Germain	Lille

PARIS SG:
GK	1	(France) Grégory Coupet
RB	2	(Brazil) Ceará
CB	6	(France) Zoumana Camara
CB	3	(France) Mamadou Sakho
LB	5	(Ivory Coast) Siaka Tiéné	(yellow card) 86'
DM	20	(France) Clément Chantôme
DM	4	(France) Claude Makélélé (c)		(substituted off) 48'
AM	12	(France) Mathieu Bodmer		(substituted off) 69'
RW	7	(France) Ludovic Giuly		(substituted off) 90'
LW	10	(Brazil) Nenê	(yellow card) 42'
CF	9	(France) Guillaume Hoarau
Substitutes:
GK	30	(Armenia) Apoula Edel
DF	22	(France) Sylvain Armand
DF	24	(France) Tripy Makonda
MF	23	(France) Jérémy Clément		(substituted on) 48'
MF	31	(Mali) Adama Touré		(substituted on) 90'
FW	11	(Turkey) Mevlüt Erdinç		(substituted on) 69'
FW	25	(France) Jean-Christophe Bahebeck
Manager:
(France) Antoine Kombouaré

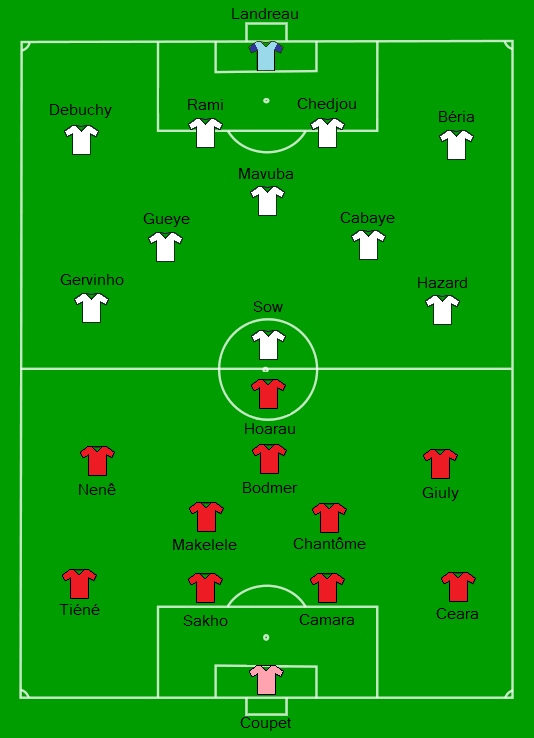

LILLE:
GK	1	(France) Mickaël Landreau
RB	2	(France) Mathieu Debuchy
CB	23	(France) Adil Rami
CB	22	(Cameroon) Aurélien Chedjou
LB	18	(France) Franck Béria
DM	24	(France) Rio Mavuba (c)
CM	5	(Senegal) Idrissa Gueye	(substituted off) 63'
CM	7	(France) Yohan Cabaye
RW	27	(Ivory Coast) Gervinho
LW	26	(Belgium) Eden Hazard	(substituted off) 89'
CF	8	(Senegal) Moussa Sow	(substituted off) 79'
Substitutes:
GK	30	(Republic of the Congo) Barel Mouko
DF	15	(Brazil) Emerson
DF	14	(Czech Republic) David Rozenhal
MF	10	(Poland) Ludovic Obraniak	(substituted on) 79'
MF	29	(France) Stéphane Dumont	(substituted on) 89'
FW	9	(Brazil) Túlio de Melo	(substituted on) 63'
FW	17	(France) Pierre-Alain Frau
Manager:
(France) Rudi Garcia

MATCH OFFICIALS

- Assistant referees:
  - Cyril Gringore (Lower Normandy)
  - Nicolas Danos (Midi-Pyrénées)
- Fourth official: Ruddy Buquet (Picardy)
- Chief Observer: Antoine de Pandis
- Chief Delegate: René Brugger
- Assistant delegates:
  - Alain Debinski
  - Rodolphe Naro

MAN OF THE MATCH

- (Poland) Ludovic Obraniak

MATCH RULES

- 90 minutes.
- 30 minutes of extra-time if necessary.
- Penalty shoot-out if scores still level.
- Seven named substitutes.
- Maximum of three substitutions.

== See also ==
- 2010–11 Coupe de France
