= Wilfrid Nanou =

French footballer (born 1979)

Personal information
- Date of birth: April 16, 1979 (age 47)
- Place of birth: Lyon, France
- Height: 1.79 m (5 ft 10 1/2 in)
- Position: Midfielder

Senior career*
| Years | Team | Apps | (Gls) |
| 1998–2000 | FC Vaulx-en-Velin | | |
| 2001–2003 | Raith Rovers | 59 | (3) |
| 2003–2007 | FC Villefranche | | |
| 2007–2009 | AS Lyon Duchère | | |
| 2009–2011 | FC Bourg-Péronnas | | |
- * Club domestic league appearances and goals as of 14:07, 25 November 2011 (UTC)

Wilfrid Nanou (born April 16, 1979) is a French professional football player.

He played on the professional level in Scottish Football League First Division for Raith Rovers F.C.
