= Ludovic Obraniak =

Polish footballer (born 1984)

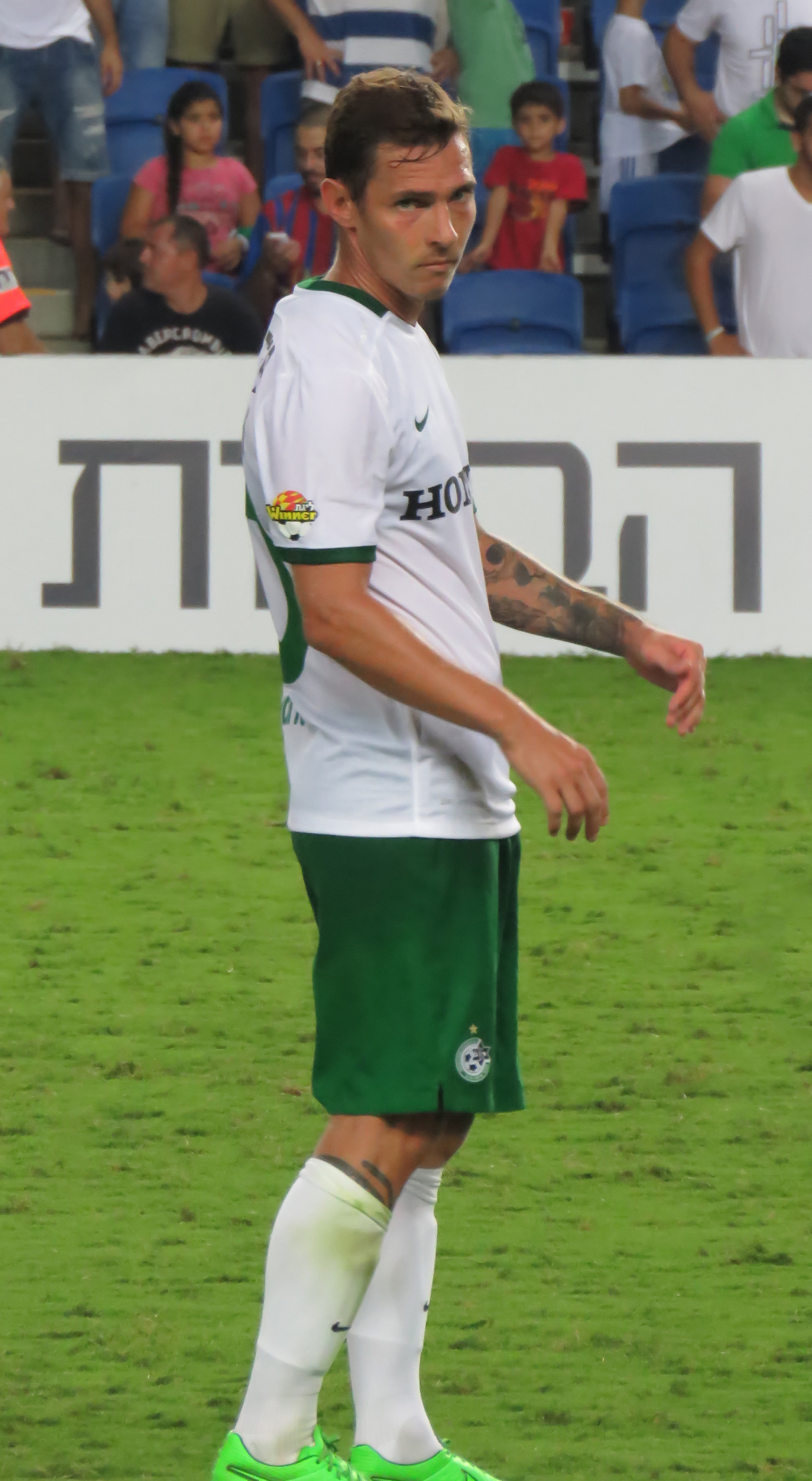
- Obraniak playing for Maccabi Haifa in 2016

Personal information
- Full name: Ludovic Joseph Obraniak
- Date of birth: 10 November 1984 (age 42)
- Place of birth: Longeville-lès-Metz, France
- Height: 1.74 m (5 ft 9 in)
- Position: Attacking midfielder

Youth career
- 1991–1996: Union Lorraine de Plantieres
- 1997–2002: Metz

Senior career*
Years	Team	Apps	(Gls)
2002–2007	Metz	99	(5)
2007–2012	Lille	152	(19)
2012–2014	Bordeaux	68	(14)
2014–2015	Werder Bremen	12	(1)
2014–2015	→ Çaykur Rizespor (loan)	16	(2)
2015–2016	Maccabi Haifa	26	(3)
2016–2018	Auxerre	36	(0)
Total		409	(44)

International career
2004	France U21	1	(0)
2009–2014	Poland	34	(6)

Managerial career
- 2021–2022: Le Touquet
- * Club domestic league appearances and goals

Ludovic Joseph Obraniak (Polish pronunciation: [luˈdɔvʲik ɔˈbraɲak]; born 10 November 1984) is a football manager and former professional player. He primarily played as an attacking midfielder. Born in France, he played for the Poland national team.

== Club career ==
=== Metz ===
Obraniak began his football career with his local club Metz. Due to his consistent play in the reserves, he was quickly promoted to the senior side by then-manager Jean Fernandez making his debut during the 2003–04 season in a 2–0 loss to Bordeaux coming on as a late-match substitute wearing the number 13 shirt. Over the next two years, Metz showed their inconsistent play finishing 16th in 2004–05 and finishing dead bottom of the table in 2005–06, thus being relegated. Obraniak was the primary bright spot in the squad appearing in 61 matches and scoring three goals over those years.

With Metz in Ligue 2, several Ligue 1 clubs drew their interest over to Obraniak. Despite this, he still played half the season in Ligue 2 with Metz appearing in 20 matches and scoring two goals. The following winter would see his departure. After weeks of silent negotiating, Metz finally came to an agreement on 23 January 2007 with the Nord-Pas de Calais-based side Lille. Metz received €1.2 million, as well as the Swiss player Daniel Gygax.

=== Lille ===
Obraniak agreed to a four-year contract keeping him with the club until 2010. He made his debut with Lille four days later coming on substitute in a match against Bordeaux. He played in every remaining match that season, making on and off starts and substitute appearances. With Lille playing in the UEFA Champions League that season, he appeared in both legs of their knockout stage match against Manchester United. The following season, Obraniak had a solid season appearing in 35 matches and scoring two goals, though Lille finished out of Europe in the league standings. For the 2008–09 season, he got off to a fast start scoring 7 goals in only 16 appearances contributing to Lille's 5th-place position heading into the winter break. In later seasons, he was not a regular starter and decided to leave the club. He was however instrumental in helping Lille win the Ligue 1 and Coupe de France double in the 2010–11 season. In the 2011 Coupe de France Final he came on as a substitute for Moussa Sow and scored the winning goal to give Lille a 1–0 win over Paris Saint-Germain.

=== Bordeaux ===
On 12 January 2012, Obraniak signed a three-and-a-half-year contract with Ligue 1 outfit Bordeaux. In February, he scored two goals in a 5–4 away win against his former club Lille, including the winning goal in injury time.

=== Werder Bremen ===
In January 2014, Obraniak left France for the first time of his career and moved to German Bundesliga club Werder Bremen. He signed for two and a half years until summer 2016 and the transfer fee was believed to be €2 million. Prior to his decision for Werder, he consulted fellow Frenchman Johan Micoud who had a great spell in Bremen in the 2000s. However, his time in Bremen did not become a success. After his signing he was a regular for eight matches but then he apparently lost favor with head coach Robin Dutt. Following Dutt's sacking in October 2014 he raised vainly hopes of improving his situation, also being left out of the squad in almost official matches under new coach Viktor Skrypnyk.

=== Çaykur Rizespor ===
In January 2015, he was loaned to Turkish Süper Lig club Çaykur Rizespor for the remainder of the season. Bremen granted them also a buy-out option for summer 2015. He made his league debut against Galatasaray on 25 January 2015.

=== Maccabi Haifa ===
On 27 August 2015, he signed for Israeli Premier League giants Maccabi Haifa, After passing a medical test, he signed a two-year contract worth €400,000 per year. On 12 September, Obraniak made his debut against Bnei Sakhnin.

On 24 May 2016, he scored the winning goal in the 2015–16 Israel State Cup final, against Maccabi Tel Aviv. On 17 August 2016, Obraniak was released from Maccabi Haifa after one year.

=== Retirement ===
On 4 October 2018, he announced his retirement as a player from football.

== International career ==
Obraniak made an appearance for the France under-21 squad; however, since it was not a match for points FIFA did not consider him permanently capped. This was later confirmed by FIFA's decision to remove the age limit on nationality switches of players who had only been capped at youth level.

Due to having Polish roots through his grandfather, Zygmunt Obraniak who was from Pobiedziska in Poznań County, the player became the subject of interest from the Poland national football team and applied for citizenship of the country. Since his grandfather had never renounced Polish citizenship, according to Polish laws Obraniak's citizenship did not need to be granted by the Polish government but simply verified by the Masovian voivode. Obraniak was confirmed as a Polish citizen on 5 June 2009.

On 23 July 2009, he was officially called up to the Poland team by coach Leo Beenhakker for the squad's friendly against Greece, where Obraniak scored both goals in the match making a 2–0 victory for Poland.

He played in all three games for Poland at Euro 2012.

== Managerial career ==
Obraniak was appointed head coach of Le Touquet on 5 June 2021.

== Personal life ==
Obraniak's daughter was born on 1 June 2011.

Obraniak is fluent in French and English. Despite representing Poland on an international level, he does not speak Polish fluently.

== Career statistics ==
=== Club ===
Appearances and goals by club, season and competition
Club	Season	League			National cup (Note: Includes Coupe de France, DFB-Pokal, Turkish Cup, Israel State Cup)		League cup (Note: Includes Coupe de la Ligue)		Continental		Other		Total	
Club	Season	Division	Apps	Goals	Apps	Goals	Apps	Goals	Apps	Goals	Apps	Goals	Apps	Goals
Metz	2002–03	Ligue 2	9	0	2	0	2	0	—		—		13	0
Metz	2003–04	Ligue 1	9	0	1	0	1	0	—		—		11	0
Metz	2004–05	Ligue 1	30	2	2	0	1	0	—		—		33	2
Metz	2005–06	Ligue 1	31	1	2	0	1	0	—		—		34	1
Metz	2006–07	Ligue 2	20	2	3	0	1	0	—		—		24	2
Metz	Total		99	5	10	0	6	0	0	0	—		115	5
Lille	2006–07	Ligue 1	17	0	1	0	—		2 (Note: Appearances in UEFA Champions League)	0	—		20	0
Lille	2007–08	Ligue 1	35	2	3	0	1	0	—		—		39	2
Lille	2008–09	Ligue 1	33	9	3	0	1	0	—		—		37	9
Lille	2009–10	Ligue 1	29	4	1	0	2	0	11 (Note: Appearances in UEFA Europa League)	2	—		43	6
Lille	2010–11	Ligue 1	26	2	6	1	2	0	9	1	—		43	4
Lille	2011–12	Ligue 1	12	2	—		1	0	5	0	1 (Note: Appearance in Trophée des Champions)	0	19	2
Lille	Total		152	19	14	1	7	0	27	3	1	0	201	23
Bordeaux	2011–12	Ligue 1	17	4	2	0	—		—		—		19	4
Bordeaux	2012–13	Ligue 1	30	6	5	1	—		8	1	—		43	8
Bordeaux	2013–14	Ligue 1	21	4	1	0	2	0	4	0	1	0	29	4
Bordeaux	Total		68	14	8	1	2	0	12	1	1	0	91	16
Werder Bremen	2013–14	Bundesliga	10	1	—		—		—		—		10	1
Werder Bremen	2014–15	Bundesliga	2	0	1	0	—		—		—		3	0
Werder Bremen	Total		12	1	1	0	0	0	0	0	—		13	1
Çaykur Rizespor (loan)	2014–15	Süper Lig	16	2	2	0	—		—		—		18	2
Maccabi Haifa	2015–16	Israeli Premier League	26	3	4	0	—		2	0	—		32	3
Auxerre	2016–17	Ligue 2	20	0	5	0	—		—		—		25	0
Auxerre	2017–18	Ligue 2	16	0	3	0	1	0	—		—		20	0
Auxerre	Total		36	0	8	0	1	0	0	0	—		45	0
Career total			409	44	47	2	18	0	39	4	2	0	515	50

=== International ===
Appearances and goals by national team and year
National team	Year	Apps	Goals
Poland
Poland	2009	7	2
Poland	2010	5	2
Poland	2011	8	0
Poland	2012	10	2
Poland	2013	2	0
Poland	2014	2	0
Total		34	6

Scores and results list Poland's goal tally first, score column indicates score after each Obraniak goal.

List of international goals scored by Ludovic Obraniak
No.	Date	Venue	Opponent	Score	Result	Competition	Ref.
1	12 August 2009	Bydgoszcz, Poland	Greece	2–0	2–0	Friendly	
2	12 October 2010	Montreal, Canada	Ecuador	2–1	2–2	Friendly	
3	17 November 2010	Poznań, Poland	Ivory Coast	2–1	3–1	Friendly	
4	2 June 2012	Warsaw, Poland	Andorra	1–0	4–0	Friendly	
5	14 November 2012	Gdańsk, Poland	Uruguay	1–2	1–3	Friendly	

== Honours ==
Lille

- Ligue 1: 2010–11
- Coupe de France: 2010–11

Bordeaux

- Coupe de France: 2012–13

Maccabi Haifa

- Israel State Cup: 2015–16

Individual

- Coupe de France Final Man of the Match: 2011
