= Vénissieux FC =

French football club

Vénissieux
- Full name: Vénissieux Football Club
- Founded: 1969; 57 years ago as Association Sportive des Minguettes Vénissieux
- Ground: Stade Laurent Gerin, Vénissieux
- Chairman: Ahmed Zouak
- Manager: Patrice Ouazar
- League: CFA 2 Group D

Vénissieux Football Club, is a French association football club. They are based in the town of Vénissieux and their home stadium is the Stade Laurent Gerin. As of the 2009–10 season, they played in the Championnat de France amateur 2 Group D.

In 2018 AS Minguettes, founded in 1969, and US Vénissieux, founded in 1933, merged into Vénissieux Football Club.

== Notable players ==
- (France) Luis Fernandez (youth)
