= Sébastien Renouard =

French footballer (born 1984)

Personal information
- Date of birth: 11 July 1984 (age 42)
- Place of birth: Nancy, France
- Height: 1.82 m (6 ft 0 in)
- Position: Midfielder

Youth career
- 1999–2002: Metz

Senior career*
| Years | Team | Apps | (Gls) |
| 2002–2009 | Metz | 125 | (8) |
| 2009–2011 | Angers | 36 | (4) |
| 2011–2012 | Laval | 22 | (2) |
| 2013 | Fola Esch | 7 | (2) |
| 2013–2014 | Laval | 18 | (2) |
| Total | | 208 | (18) |

International career
| 2004 | France U21 | 2 | (0) |
- * Club domestic league appearances and goals

Sébastien Renouard (born 11 July 1984) is a French former professional footballer who played as a midfielder.

== Career ==
Born in Nancy, Renouard began his career in the youth sides of FC Metz and before being promoted to the senior side in Ligue 1 in 2002. On 11 August 2009, Angers SCO signed the midfielder from FC Metz on a two-year deal. He went on to score four goals in 36 league appearances for Angers before joining Stade Lavallois in the summer of 2011. Renouard played 22 games for Laval during the 2011–12 season, scoring twice, but was released by the club at the end of the campaign.
