= FC Aurillac Arpajon Cantal Auvergne =

French football club

Aurillac Arpajon
- Full name: Football Club Aurillac Arpajon Cantal Auvergne
- Founded: 1953
- Ground: Stade de Baradel
- Capacity: 3,000
- Chairman: Herve Blanc
- Manager: Freddy Morel
- League: National 3 Group M
- 2021–22: National 3 Group M, 13th (relegated)
- Website: https://www.aurillacfoot.com
Home colours	Away colours

Football Club Aurillac Arpajon Cantal Auvergne (formerly Aurillac Foot Cantal Auvergne) is a French association football team founded in 1953. It is based in Aurillac, Cantal, France and is playing in the sixth tier of French football. It plays at the Stade de Baradel which has a capacity of 3,000. In 2013 the club adopted the current name after a merger with ES Arpajon.
