= FC Vaulx-en-Velin =

French football club

- Full name: Football Club Vaulx-en-Velin
- Founded: 1946
- Ground: Stade Francisque-Jomard; Vaulx-en-Velin
- Capacity: 1200
- President: Mohamed Ouled
- Manager: Said Méhamha
- League: National 3 Group K
- 2022–23: National 3 Group M, 5th
- Website: https://fc-vaulx-en-velin.footeo.com/

Football Club Vaulx-en-Velin are a French football club situated in Vaulx-en-Velin, in the Metropolis of Lyon. The club was formed in 1946 and plays its games at Stade Francisque-Jomard in the town.

Since 2017 the team competes in Championnat National 3, the fifth tier of French football. Notably, the club reached the Round of 32 in the 2010–11 Coupe de France as a sixth-tier side.

== History ==
The team were founded in 1946.

In 1985, the team finished second in its Promotion de Ligue group and thus reached the Honneur Régional (respectively second and third regional level). At the end of the first season at this level, the team again finished first in its group and was therefore promoted to Division d'Honneur (top regional division) of the Ligue Rhône-Alpes.

The club played six seasons at the first regional level before winning the league title in 1992 and accessing the fourth national division, the French Division 4 Championship.

In its first season at this level, the team finished first in its group, but remained at the fourth level due to a restructuring of the leagues for the 1993–94 season, which placed them in Group B of the newly formed National 2.

In 1994 the club reached the Round of 64 of the 1993–94 Coupe de France, beating OGC Nice in the previous round. They repeated the achievement the following season.

After four seasons at the fourth level, the club was relegated from Group B in 1997. Another restructuring of the leagues placed the club in the new fifth level Championnat de France Amateur 2, from which they immediately secured promotion at the first attempt, finished second in Group F behind the third team of AJ Auxerre. They were relegated at the first time of asking in 1999. The first adventure in the national leagues came to an end in 2003, when the club were relegated back to the regional Division d'Honneur.

In 2011 the club reached the Round of 32 of the 2010–11 Coupe de France, their best ever performance in the competition.

After five years at the first regional level, the club won their second Division d'Honneur title in 2012 and once again reached the fifth national level, CFA 2.

The club suffered one more relegation to the regional level in 2015, regaining the national level in 2017, joining the new Championnat National 3 after another restructure and expansion of the national leagues.

== Honours ==
- Division 4: 1992–93
- Division d'Honneur: 1991–92, 2011–12
- Promotion de Ligue: 1984–85

== Notable players ==
- (France) Nabil Fekir (youth)
