= SU Agen Football =

French football club

Agen
- Full name: Sporting Union Agen Football
- Founded: 1922
- Ground: Parc Municipal des Sports, Agen
- Chairman: Thierry Pellicier
- Manager: Williams Vimbouly
- League: CFA 2 Group F
- 2008–09: CFA 2 Group F, 5th
Home colours	Away colours

Sporting Union Agen Football is a French association football club founded in 1922. They are based in the town of Agen and their home stadium is the Parc Municipal des Sports. As of the 2009–10 season, they play in the Championnat de France amateur 2 Group F.

== Notable players ==
- (Spain) Aymeric Laporte (youth)
