= 2009–10 Coupe de France =

Tournament details
- Country: France
- Teams: 7,317

Final positions
- Champions: Paris Saint-Germain
- Runners-up: Monaco

Tournament statistics
- Top goal scorer(s): Ireneusz Jeleń; Mevlüt Erdinç (4 goals)

The 2009–10 Coupe de France was the 93rd season of the most prestigious French cup competition, organized by the French Football Federation, and was open to all clubs in French football, as well as clubs from the overseas departments and territories (Guadeloupe, French Guiana, Martinique, Mayotte, New Caledonia, French Polynesia, and Réunion). The final was contested on 1 May 2010 at the Stade de France. The defending champions were Guingamp, who had defeated Rennes 2–1 in the 2008–09 final.

The winner of the competition qualified for the 2010–11 UEFA Europa League and was inserted into the Playoff round. Ligue 1 club Paris Saint-Germain won the competition by defeating fellow first division club AS Monaco by a score of 1–0 in the final. The victory gave Paris Saint-Germain their eight Coupe de France title and their third this millennium.

== Calendar ==
On 23 June 2009, the French Football Federation announced the calendar for the Coupe de France.

round	First match date	Fixtures	Clubs	Notes
Preliminary round	23 August 2009			
First round	20 August 2009			
Second round	29 August 2009			
Third round	20 September 2009			Clubs participating in CFA 2 gain entry.
Fourth round	4 October 2009			Clubs participating in the CFA gain entry.
Fifth round	18 October 2009			Clubs participating in the Championnat National gain entry.
Sixth round	1 November 2009	153	346 → 193	
Seventh round	21 November 2009	86	193 → 107	Clubs participating in Ligue 2 gain entry.
Eight round	12 December 2009	43	107 → 64	
Round of 64	9 January 2010	32	64 → 32	Clubs participating in Ligue 1 and Guingamp gain entry.
Round of 32	23 January 2010	16	32 → 16	
Round of 16	9 February 2010	8	16 → 8	
Quarter-finals	23 March 2010	4	8 → 4	
Semi-finals	13 April 2010	2	4 → 2	
Final	1 May 2010	1	2 → 1	Coupe de France Final at the Stade de France.

== Regional qualifying rounds ==
All the teams that entered the competition, but were not members of Ligue 1 or Ligue 2, had to compete in the regional qualifying rounds. The regional qualifying rounds determined the number of regional clubs that earned spots in the 7th round and this normally lasted six rounds.

== Seventh round ==
The draw for the seventh round of Coupe de France was conducted on 5 November 2009 at the Maison du Sport Français, the headquarters of the French Football Federation, in Paris by French journalist and television host Michel Drucker and Jean Djorkaeff, the president of the Coupe de France Commission. The overseas regional draw was conducted in Paris the same day, by World fencing champions Adriana Lamalle and Jean-Michel Lucenay. The matches were played on 21 and 22 November 2009.

Tie no	Home team	Score	Away team
1	Saint-Gaudens-Violette	1–3	Pau
2	Blanquefort	0–1	Trélissac
3	Perpignan Canet	1–2	Agen
4	Marignane	1–0	Bastia
5	Lattes	1–0	Bayonne
6	Arles-Avignon	0–1	Luzenac
7	Balma	2–0	Pamiers
8	Calvi	3 – 2 (aet)	Borgo
9	Vénissieux	1–4	Rodez
10	Feurs	1–0	Saint-Priest
11	Bagnols Pont	4–2	Bourgoin-Jallieu
12	Toulon	1–2	Villefranche
13	Ain Sud	0–4	Cannes
14	Grande Motte	2–1	La Murette
15	Istres	1–2	Nîmes
16	Saint-Germain-des-Fossés	1–6	Thiers
17	Cassis Carnoux	1 – 1 (aet); 2–4 p.	Ajaccio
18	Annonay	1 – 0 (aet)	Valence
19	Yzeure	1 – 1 (aet); 4–3 p.	Clermont Foot
20	Seyssinet Pariset	0–2	Montceau Bourgogne
21	Vallières	0–3	Évian
22	Mont Pilat	0–1	Bressane Marboz
23	Montluçon	0 – 0 (aet); 2–4 p.	Nevers
24	Trémery	0–3	Thionville
25	Créteil	0–2	Tours
26	Amnéville	0–3	Dijon
27	Reims	1 – 1 (aet); 5–6 p.	Saint-Dizier
28	Montereau	0–2	Moissy-Cramayel
29	Selongey	1–0	Toul
30	Jarville	2 – 2 (aet); 2–4 p.	La Chapelle Saint-Luc
31	Sens	1 – 2 (aet)	Vesoul
32	Forbach Marienau	3–1	Robertsau
33	Jura Dolois	1 – 3 (aet)	Metz
34	Colmar	5–2	Baume-les-Dames
35	Besançon	4–1	Sarrebourg
36	Bischheim Soleil	0–6	Troyes
37	Biesheim	1–3	Strasbourg

Tie no	Home team	Score	Away team
38	Mulhouse	2 – 2 (aet); 7–6 p.	Sarre-Union
39	Saint-Louis Neuweg	2–1	Oberlauterbach
40	Seclin	5–4	Luneray
41	Issy-les-Moulineaux	1 – 1 (aet); 2–3 p.	Loon-Plage
42	Sin Le Noble	0–2	Les Lilas
43	Compiègne	1 – 0 (aet)	Arras
44	Chambly	2–5	Saint-Ouen l'Aumône
45	Tourcoing	1–2	Marquette
46	Rouen	2 – 4 (aet)	Beauvais
47	Caen	1–0	Dunkerque
48	Aire-sur-la-Lys	5–0	Feignies
49	Calais	1–3	Sedan
50	Hermes	1–2	Cambrai
51	Saint-Quentin	3–1	Maubeuge
52	Roissy-en-Brie	1–7	Amiens
53	Le Havre	0–1	Avion
54	Lumbres	1–2	Marck
55	Fresnoy-le-Grand	3–0	Neuilly-sur-Marne
56	La Ferté-Bernard	4–0	Courbevoie
57	Flers	0–1	Aubervilliers
58	Pacy Vallée-d'Eure	1–0	Villemomble
59	Bonchamp-Lès-Laval	2–1	Fougères
60	Angers	1 – 0 (aet)	Poissy
61	Versailles	2–1	Granville
62	Laval	2–0	Vitré
63	La Flèche	2–3	Chartres
64	Vannes	4–1	La Vitréenne
65	Tregunc	2–3	Les Herbiers
66	Montgermont	1–4	Plabennec
67	Cherbourg	4–0	Chantepie
68	TA Rennes	3–1	Saint-Renan
69	Plouvorn	2–0	Combourg
70	Concarneau	3–0	Nantes
71	Paimpol	2–1	Châteaubriant
72	Saint-Fulgent	1–7	Orléans
73	Saint-Mars-la-Brière	0–5	Brest
74	Saumur	3–1	Châteauroux
75	Cognac	0–1	Feytiat
76	Romorantin	5–2	Poitiers
77	Cholet	3–2	Moulins
78	Saint-Sébastien-sur-Loire	1–3	Chauray
79	Saint-Jean-le-Blanc	0–2	Niort

=== Overseas region ===
Tie no	Home team	Score	Away team
1	Marie Galante	2–3	Le Poiré-sur-Vie
2	Excelsior	1–0	Quimper
3	Manu-Ura	0–3	Raon-l'Etape
4	Vendée Luçon	2–1	Franciscain

Tie no	Home team	Score	Away team
5	Quevilly	6–0	Kawéni
6	Pontivy	5–0	Cayenne
7	Avranches	5 – 3 (aet)	Mont-Dore

== Eighth round ==
The draw for the eighth round of the Coupe de France was conducted on 25 November 2009 at the headquarters of the French Football Federation, in Paris, by FCF Juvisy and women's national team member Sandrine Soubeyrand, taekwondo world champion Gwladys Épangue, former national team member Steve Marlet, and Jean Djorkaeff, the president of the Coupe de France Commission. The matches were played on 12 and 13 December 2009.

Tie no	Home team	Score	Away team
1	Nîmes	1 – 1 (aet); 2–4 p.	Pau
2	Cannes	3–0	Luzenac
3	Agen	0 – 0 (aet); 5–4 p.	Calvi
4	Villefranche	2–1	Annonay
5	Grande Motte	1–0	Marignane
6	Balma	1–3	Ajaccio
7	Lattes	1–0	Bagnols Pont
8	Feurs	0–4	Évian
9	Vesoul	4–1	Forbach Marienau
10	Strasbourg	3–0	Thionville
11	Saint-Louis Neuweg	4–0	Besançon
12	Colmar	2 – 2 (aet); 4–2 p.	Metz
13	Mulhouse	4–1	La Chapelle Saint-Luc
14	Raon-l'Étape	6–1	Bressane Marboz
15	Laval	4–0	Le Poiré-sur-Vie
16	Thiers	3–1	Niort
17	Rodez	3–1	Vendée Luçon
18	La Ferté-Bernard	2–3	Trélissac
19	Romorantin	0–2	Vannes
20	Feytiat	0–1	Chauray
21	TA Rennes	1 – 2 (aet)	Brest
22	Plabennec	2–0	Concarneau
23	Pontivy	5–1	Plouvorn

Tie no	Home team	Score	Away team
24	Bonchamp-lès-Laval	1 – 1 (aet); 5–4 p.	Paimpol
25	Cherbourg	0–3	Avranches
26	Pacy Vallée-d'Eure	0–2	Quevilly
27	Cholet	2 – 2 (aet); 4–5 p.	Saumur
28	Aire-sur-la-Lys	0–1	Seclin
29	Sedan	3–1	Moissy-Cramayel
30	Cambrai	0–1	Aubervilliers
31	Loon-Plage	1–2	Marquette
32	Les Lilas	0–1	Caen
33	Amiens	2–1	Avion
34	Marck	2 – 2 (aet); 2–4 p.	Compiègne
35	Tours	2–1	Montereau
36	Saint-Ouen l'Aumône	1 – 1 (aet); 3–2 p.	Yzeure
37	Nevers	1–4	Beauvais
38	Fresnoy-le-Grand	0–1	Saint-Quentin
39	Versailles	1–0	Dijon
40	Troyes	2–1	Selongey
41	Saint-Dizier	4 – 3 (aet)	Orléans
42	Angers	5–0	Excelsior
43	Chartres	1–2	Les Herbiers

== Round of 64 ==
The draw for the round of 64 of the Coupe de France was conducted on 14 December 2009 at the Champ Libres in Rennes, by former French internationals Stéphane Guivarc'h and Daniel Rodighiero, Stade Briochin and women's national team member Eugénie Le Sommer, and the current captain of the France women's national rugby union team Sandrine Agricole. The matches were played on 9 and 10 January 2010. The matches that were postponed were contested at a later date.

Tie no	Home team	Score	Away team
1	Grenoble	3–2	Montpellier
2	Grande Motte	0–3	Villefranche
3	Pau	0–2	Évian
4	Trélissac	0–2	Marseille
5	AS Monaco	0 – 0 (aet); 4–3 p.	Tours
6	Ajaccio	3–0	Cannes
7	Lattes	0–1	Angers
8	Thiers	1 – 1 (aet); 2–3 p.	Nancy
9	Saint-Louis Neuweg	0–1	Sochaux
10	Marquette	1–2	Mulhouse
11	Saint-Ouen l'Aumône	0–3	Sedan
12	Laval	1 – 2 (aet)	Vesoul
13	Strasbourg	1–3	Lyon
14	Amiens	0–1	Auxerre
15	Colmar	0 – 0 (aet); 10–9 p.	Lille
16	Seclin	1–4	Boulogne

Tie no	Home team	Score	Away team
17	Pontivy	0 – 1 (aet)	Brest
18	Chauray	0–1	Agen
19	Bordeaux	1–0	Rodez
20	Avranches	0 – 1 (aet)	Saumur
21	Plabennec	2–1	Nice
22	Les Herbiers	0–1	Toulouse
23	Saint-Étienne	4–1	Lorient
24	Bonchamp-lès-Laval	0–2	Guingamp
25	Vannes	1 – 1 (aet); 8–7 p.	Troyes
26	Versailles	0–3	Beauvais
27	Compiègne	0–1	Lens
28	Rennes	2–0	Caen
29	Quevilly	6–0	Saint-Quentin
30	Aubervilliers	0–5	Paris SG
31	Le Mans	1–0	Valenciennes
32	Saint-Dizier	0–4	Raon-l'Étape

== Round of 32 ==
The draw for the round of 32 of the Coupe de France was conducted on 10 January 2010 at the Eurosport headquarters in Paris, by Miss France 2010 Malika Ménard and France national team manager Raymond Domenech. The matches will be played from 22 to 24 January 2010. The matches that had to be rescheduled due to the previous round's postponed matches being contested were played mid-week on 26 and 27 January. The cancelled matches, as a result of the round of 64 matches being rescheduled, were played on 3 February and the mid-week over on 10 February.

Tie no	Home team	Score	Away team
1	Lens	3–1	Marseille
2	Auxerre	1 – 1 (aet); 3–0 p.	Sedan
3	Nancy	0–2	Plabennec
4	Saint-Étienne	2 – 2 (aet); 3–1 p.	Villefranche
5	Beauvais	3–0	Agen
6	Toulouse	0–2	Brest
7	Quevilly	1–0	Angers
8	Mulhouse	0–1	Guingamp

Tie no	Home team	Score	Away team
9	Sochaux	3–0	Le Mans
10	Raon-l'Étape	0–1	Vesoul
11	Vannes	4 – 3 (aet)	Grenoble
12	Paris SG	3–1	Évian
13	Saumur	0–4	Rennes
14	AS Monaco	2–1	Lyon
15	Colmar	1–2	Boulogne
16	Bordeaux	5–1	Ajaccio

== Round of 16 ==
The draw for the round of 16 of the Coupe de France was conducted on 24 January 2010 at the Eurosport headquarters in Paris, by former French international Jean-Pierre Papin and French film director Fabien Onteniente. The matches were played on 9 and 10 February. The canceled match, Lens – Brest, as a result of the round of 32 matches being rescheduled, was played on 17 February.

Tie no	Home team	Score	Away team
1	Bordeaux (1)	0–2	AS Monaco (1)
2	Boulogne (1)	1–0	Guingamp (2)
3	Auxerre (1)	4–0	Plabennec (3)
4	Saint-Étienne (1)	2–0	Vannes (2)

Tie no	Home team	Score	Away team
5	Beauvais (3)	1–4	Sochaux (1)
6	Lens (1)	2 – 1 (aet)	Brest (2)
7	Quevilly (4)	1–0	Rennes (1)
8	Vesoul (4)	0–1	Paris SG (1)

== Quarter-finals ==
The draw for the quarterfinals of the Coupe de France was conducted on 14 February 2010 during a Six Nations rugby match between France and Ireland at the Stade de France. The draw was conducted by 2009 World Judo champion Morgane Ribout and Morgan Parra, a player from the national rugby team. The matches will be contested on 23 and 24 March. The Quevilly – Boulogne match was moved to the Stade Robert Diochon in nearby Rouen to accommodate the anticipated high attendance for the match. Quevilly's parent ground, Stade Lozai, seats only 2,500 spectators.

23 March 2010	Quevilly (4)	3–1	Boulogne (1)	Rouen
18:00 CET	Coquio 11'; Laup 29'; Ouahbi 67'	Report	Marcq 45'	Stadium: Stade Robert Diochon; Attendance: 10,490; Referee: Bruno Coue (Ligue de la Méditerranée)

23 March 2010	Auxerre (1)	0–0 (a.e.t.) (5–6 p)	Paris Saint-Germain (1)	Auxerre
20:45 CET		Report		Stadium: Stade l'Abbé-Deschamps; Attendance: 0 Referee: Tony Chapron (Ligue de Normandie)
	Penalties
	Hengbart (penalty scored); Pedretti (penalty scored); Mignot (penalty scored); Ndinga (penalty scored); Dudka (penalty scored); Quercia (penalty missed)		(penalty scored) Hoarau; (penalty scored) Jallet; (penalty scored) Chantôme; (penalty scored) Kežman; (penalty scored) Giuly; (penalty scored) Makélélé

24 March 2010	Monaco (1)	4–3 (a.e.t.)	Sochaux (1)	Monaco
17:00 CET	Puygrenier 34'; Haruna 38'; Pino 90+4'; Maâzou 95'	Report	Boudebouz 29'; Dalmat 48'; Brown 71'	Stadium: Stade Louis II; Attendance: 5,409; Referee: Antony Gautier (Ligue Nord-Pas de Calais)

24 March 2010	Lens (1)	3–1	Saint-Étienne (1)	Lens
20:45 CET	Eduardo 63'; Yahia 75'; Roudet 89'	Report	Mirallas 1'	Stadium: Stade Félix-Bollaert; Attendance: 22,191; Referee: Olivier Thual (Ligue d'Aquitaine)

== Semi-finals ==
The draw for the semi-finals of the Coupe de France was conducted on 28 March 2010 during a broadcast of France 2 show Stade 2. The draw was conducted by former Gabon national team manager and former French international Alain Giresse. The matches were contested on 13 and 14 April. The first match was televised on Eurosport and the second match was shown on France 2. The Quevilly – Paris Saint-Germain match was moved to the Stade Michel d'Ornano in Caen, which is located in Lower Normandy, not far from Rouen, which situates in Upper Normandy. The move, similar to the previous round, was made to accommodate the anticipated high attendance for the match and also because the French Football Federation felt the Stade Robert Diochon did not meet the standards needed to host a Coupe de France semi-final match.

13 April 2010	Monaco (1)	1–0 (a.e.t.)	Lens (1)	Monaco
20:30 CEST	Maâzou 111'	Report		Stadium: Stade Louis II; Attendance: 10,382; Referee: Stéphane Bré (Ligue de Bretagne)

14 April 2010	Quevilly (4)	0–1	Paris Saint-Germain (1)	Caen
20:45 CEST		Report	Erdinç 50'	Stadium: Stade Michel d'Ornano; Attendance: 20,523; Referee: Fredy Fautrel (Ligue de Basse-Normandie)

== Final ==
1 May 2010
20:45 CET

Monaco	0–1 (a.e.t.)	Paris Saint-Germain
	Report	Hoarau 105'

Stade de France, Saint-Denis
Attendance: 75,000
Referee: Lionel Jaffredo (Brittany)

== Topscorer ==
Ireneusz Jeleń (4 goals)
Mevlüt Erdinç (4 goals)

== Media coverage ==
For the second consecutive season in France, France Télévisions were the free to air broadcasters while Eurosport were the subscription broadcasters.

These matches were broadcast live on French television:

Round	France Télévisions	Eurosport
Seventh round		
Eighth round		
Round of 64		
Round of 32		
Round of 16		
Quarterfinals		
Semifinals		
Final		
