= 67th Medical Group =

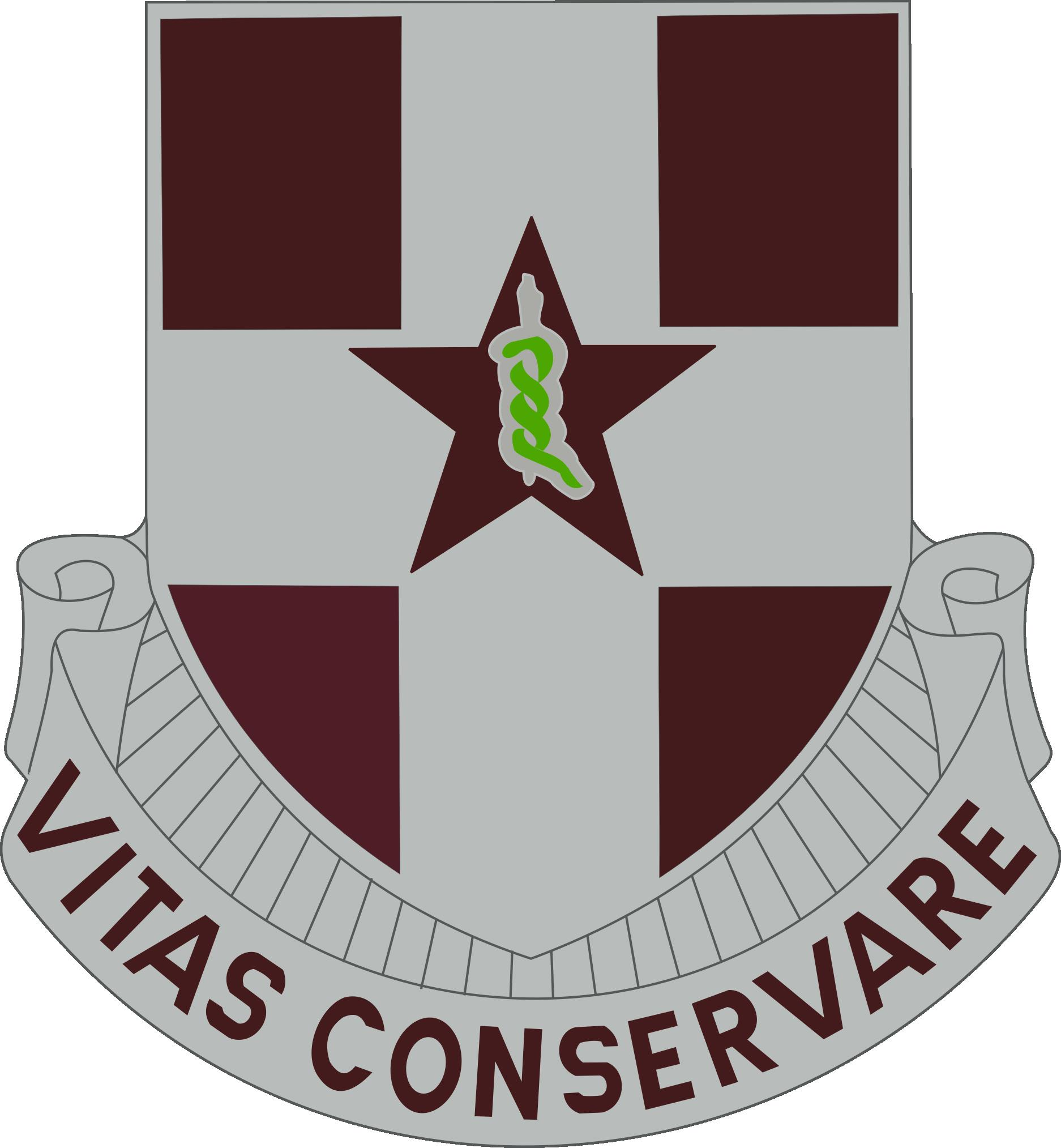
- 67th Medical Group Distinctive Unit Insignia
- Active: 20 August 1942--20 November 1945; 20 October 1954--20 January 1972
- Country: United States
- Allegiance: Regular Army
- Branch: U.S. Army
- Type: Medical Group
- Mottos: Vitas Conservare (To Preserve Life)
- Colors: Maroon and White
- Engagements: World War II; Vietnam War
- Battle honours: Meritorious Unit Commendation (Army), Streamer Embroidered: VIETNAM 1968-1969 VIETNAM 1969-1970

The 67th Medical Group was constituted 13 July 1942 in the Army of the United States as the 67th Medical Regiment. Reorganized as a medical group in 1943, it served in the European Theater of Operations in World War II. Inactivated at the end of the war, it was reactivated in 1954 at Fort Sam Houston, Texas and served there until deploying to serve in the Vietnam War in 1967. It has been inactive since 1972.

== Lineage ==
- Constituted 13 July 1942 in the Army of the United States as the 67th Medical Regiment
- Activated 20 August 1942 at Camp Barkeley, Texas.
- Regiment reorganized from an Organic Regiment to a Separate Group on 15 September 1943 with elements reorganized and redesignated as follows:
1. Headquarters, Headquarters and Service Company as Headquarters and Headquarters Detachment, 67th Medical Group.
2. Company A as the 443rd Collecting Company.
3. Company B, as the 444th Collecting Company.
4. Company C as the 445th Collecting Company.
5. Company E, as the 446th Collecting Company.
6. Company F as the 447th Collecting Company.
7. Company G as the 448th Collecting Company.
8. Company D as the 615th Clearing Company.
9. Company H as the 616th Clearing Company.
- Inactivated 20 November 1945 at Camp Kilmer, New Jersey
- Allotted 27 September 1954 to the Regular Army
- Activated 20 October 1954 at Fort Sam Houston, Texas
- Arrived in Vietnam on 24 September 1967, and was stationed at Bien Hoa as part of the 44th Medical Brigade.
- Group Became operational on 23 October 1967.
- Group reassigned to Da Nang on 28 February 1968.
- Inactivated 20 January 1972 at Fort Lewis, Washington

== Honors ==
=== Campaign participation credit ===
- World War II:
1. Normandy;
2. Northern France;
3. Rhineland;
4. Ardennes-Alsace;
5. Central Europe
- Vietnam:
1. Counteroffensive, Phase III;
2. Tet Counteroffensive;
3. Counteroffensive, Phase IV;
4. Counteroffensive, Phase V;
5. Counteroffensive, Phase VI;
6. Tet 69/Counteroffensive;
7. Summer-Fall 1969;
8. Winter-Spring 1970;
9. Sanctuary Counteroffensive;
10. Counteroffensive, Phase VII;
11. Consolidation I;
12. Consolidation II

=== Decorations ===
- Meritorious Unit Commendation (Army) for:
1. VIETNAM 1968–1969
2. VIETNAM 1969–1970

== Distinctive unit insignia ==
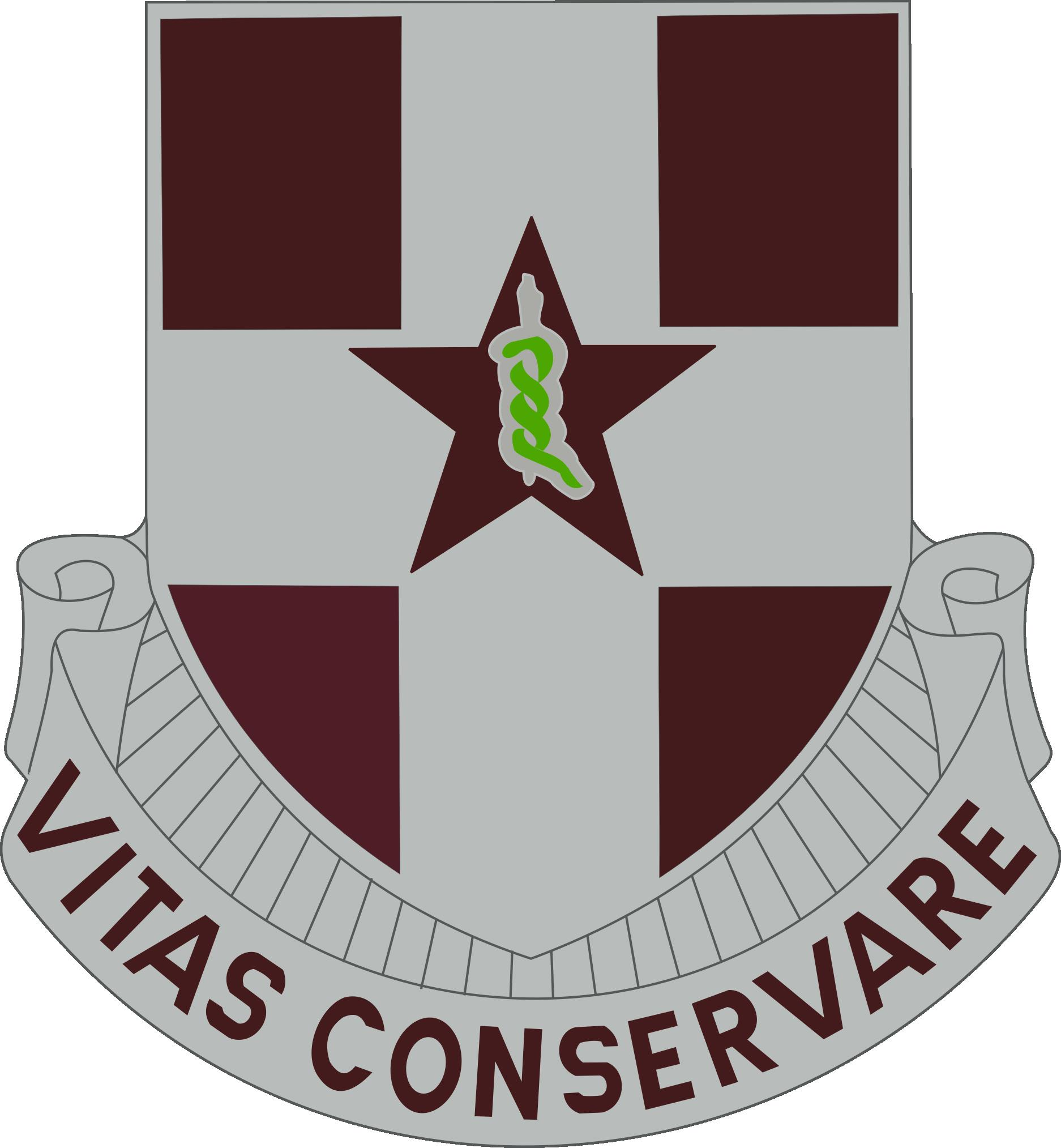
Distinctive Unit Insignia, 67th Medical Group

=== Description ===
A Silver color metal and enamel device 1 1/8 inches (2.86 cm) in height overall consisting of a shield blazoned: Sanguine, on a cross Argent a mullet of the field, surmounted by a staff of the second entwined by a serpent Proper. Attached below and to the sides of the shield a Silver scroll inscribed “VITAS CONSERVARE” in Maroon letters.

=== Symbolism ===
In the maroon and white of the Medical Department the functions of the organization are symbolized by the cross, the accepted symbol of Christianity, and the serpent entwining the staff of Aesculapius. The star being representative of the state of activation, Texas. The motto “Vitas Conservare” (To Preserve Life), is expressive of the purpose of the organization in saving lives, and is of an idealistic nature.

=== Background ===
The distinctive unit insignia was originally approved for the 67th Medical Regiment on 5 November 1942. It was redesignated for the 67th Medical Group and amended to correct the spelling of the motto on 11 May 1967.

== History ==
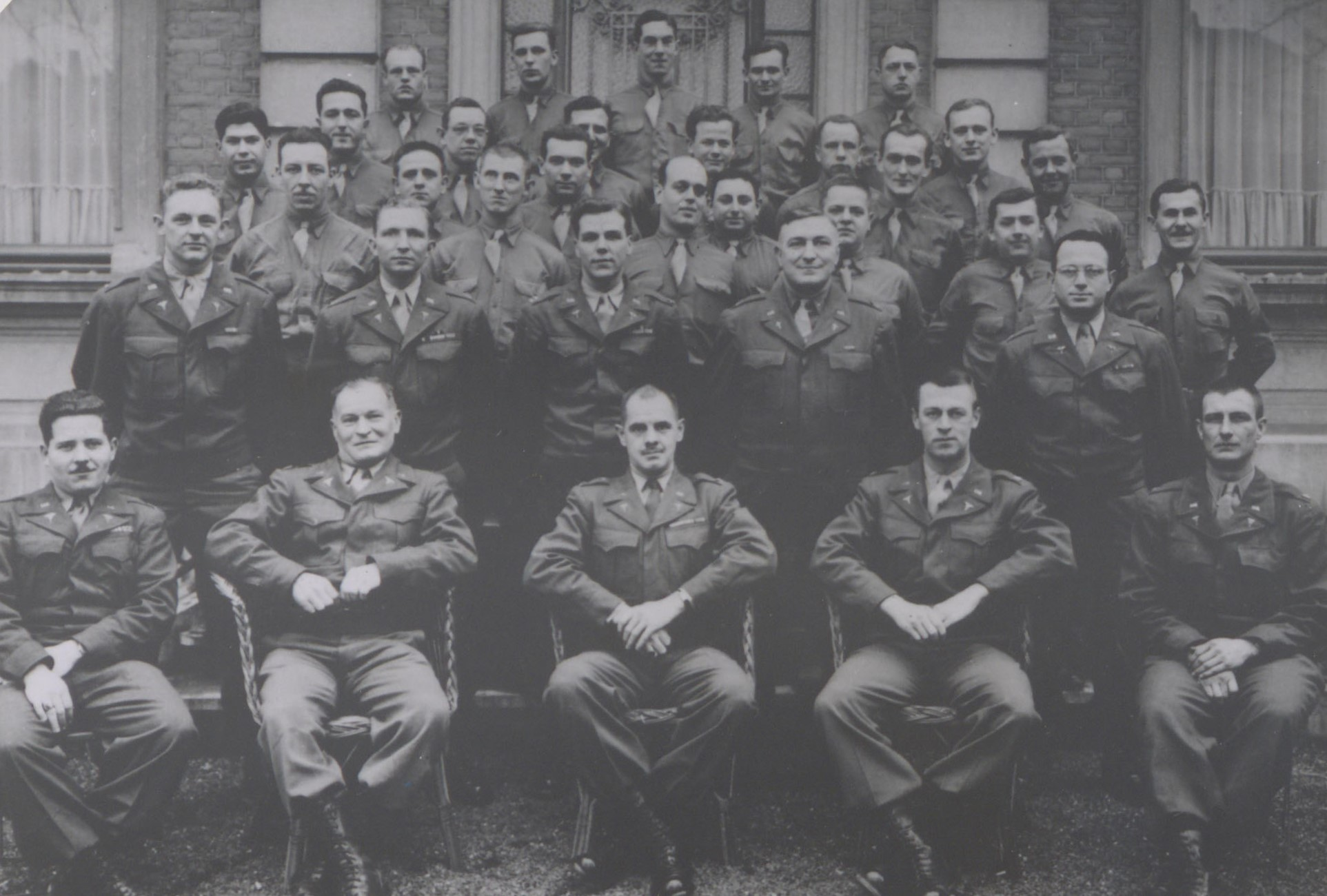
Officers and Men of Headquarters and Headquarters Detachment, 67th Medical Group, Hastiere-Lavaux, Belgium, March 1945

=== World War II ===
The 67th Medical Regiment was activated at Camp Barkeley, Texas on 20 August 1942. The Regiment was composed of a Headquarters and Headquarters and Service Company and line Companies A, B, C, D, E, F and G. The Regiment was commanded by Captain Melvin F. Eyerman.

The Regiment was initially attached to X Corps for administration and in September 1942 was attached to VIII Corps. For the remainder of the year, activities were limited to bringing the unit up to strength and to training. On 13 November 1942 the Regiment reached full strength. On 3 December 1942 the Regiment held its initial Retreat Parade and received their National Colors.

On 20 January 1943 the Regiment was released from attachment to VIII Corps and attached to 11th Headquarters Special Troops for administration and supervision of training. The tempo of training was stepped up, training marches were increasing, and emphasis was placed on the training of medical and surgical technicians. In February 1943, Lieutenant Colonel William R. Haas assumed command of the Regiment.

The Regiment reached a milestone in its history on 13 March 1943 when the Commanding Officer of 11th Headquarters Special Troops presented the Regiment Colors at a special review.

On 18 March, command of the Regiment passed to Lieutenant Colonel Harold E. Zittel. For the next two months the Regiment was involved in unit training and preparing loading plans and in June 1943 departed for maneuvers in Louisiana.

On 22 July 1943 Lt Col Haas again assumed command of the Regiment, and on 7 September 1943 the Regiment returned to Camp Barkeley. On 10 September instructions were received from Third Army Headquarters to reorganize into a Medical Group. The 67th Medical Regiment was reorganized as of midnight, 14 September 1943 and the remainder of the Regiment were designated as follows: Headquarters & Service Co was designated as Headquarters & Headquarters Detachment, 67th Medical Group; Companies A, B, C, E, F, and G were designated as the 443d, 444th, 445th, 446th, 447th, and 448th Medical Companies (Clearing), respectively; Companies D and H were designated as the 615th and 616th Medical Companies (Collecting), respectively.

Lt Col Haas signed General Order Number 1 of the 67th Medical Group on 15 September as he assumed command of the new organization. General Order Number 92, Headquarters Third Army, Fort Sam Houston had reassigned the Regiment to 11th Headquarters Special Troops and the group continued to be assigned to the 11th Special Troops Battalion.

The training program was re-established to begin where the unit left off before maneuvers. For the remainder of the year the group participated in intensive individual and unit readiness training. In November 1943 the 615th and 616th Companies (Clearing) were queried for a readiness date. On 16 December 1943 the units were notified to depart for the Louisiana Maneuver Area in three days.

On 17 December the group headquarters was given a readiness date of 25 January 1944. Real action, complete with packing and inventories began. The advance party departed for Fort Hamilton on 25 January 1944. The group closed at Camp Kilmer on 5 February 1944 and on 11 February embarked on the RMS Queen Mary and sailed that day. After 8 days at sea, the group arrived at Greenock, Scotland and from there proceeded to Stone, Staffordshire, England.

On 5 March 1944 the 168th and 204th Medical Battalions were attached to the group. During the period March thru May 1944 activities were confined to unit training, repairing facilities and reorganization of units within the group. In May the 173rd, 174th and 37th Medical Battalions were attached to the group. On 27 May 1944, the 174th and 37th Medical Battalions were detached from the group. On 10 June 1944 the group gained the 433rd and 434th Medical Companies (Collecting) and the 601st, 648th and 666th Medical Companies (Clearing). Toward the end of June 1944 training was increased and familiarization with arms and range firing completed.

During the week ending 1 July 1944 Group activities were stepped up: boxing, crating, painting, marking, etc. Load plans were revised and instructions in French was initiated.

On 8 July 1944 a warning order was received, followed immediately by a movement order. On 10 July the group arrived at Preston and Sutton Poyntz, bunking and messing with a signal depot company that was supposed to have been in France long ago except for one small detail – the Allies hadn't as yet captured the place where they were supposed to set up. Three days later the group moved to the marshalling area at Seaton Barracks, near Plymouth. Colonel Haas was made troop commander of troop embarking on the SS Henry M. Rice, a 1943-vintage Liberty Ship.

On 14 July the group departed England and arrived at Utah Beach at 1500 hours, 15 July 1944. Three days were spent aboard the ship while anchored off Utah Beach. After debarking, the group marched to Saint-Germain-de-Varreville, picked up its vehicles and proceeded to Les Moitiers-d'Allonne and set up near the 659th Medical Company (Clearing).

The group made numerous moves from August to September 1944 and during this period was involved supervising the evacuation of wounded. Some of the locations of the group were: Saint-Roch-sur-Égrenne, Surfonds, Boissy-le-Repos, Epuisy, Balbigny and Drourtuille.

At Drourtuille the Corp sector was swamped with three evacuation hospitals, and group set up an ambulance regulating post. At the end of September, the group moved again to Nancy, occupying the Institution Des Aveugles (Institution for the Blind) and set up with the headquarters and station platoon of the 434th Medical Company (Collecting).

Operation of the group in September was similar to previous months except that no medical clearing companies were attached or assigned. An ambulance regulating station was operated. During this time 8076 casualties were evacuated, 8 enlisted men were listed as missing in action, one vehicle destroyed by enemy action and four ambulances captured by the Germans.

In November 1944 the concentration of evacuation hospitals was broken up by the dispersion of the hospitals to more forward areas. A big push by the Third Army was on and the 417th and 587th Medical Companies (Ambulance) were attached. During the month of November 1944, 19,588 casualties were evacuated. Overall statistics for 17 August - 30 November 1944 were: Casualties evacuated 35,220 (12,677 litter and 22,543 ambulatory).

In December 1944 the group was relieved from attachment to the Third Army and attached to the Seventh Army. During this period the group was relatively inactive from the end of November 1944 until March 1945 when it was assigned to the Fifteenth Army and moved from Suippes to Hastière-Lavaux, Belgium. The group's mission was to monitor all medical units except Evacuation Hospitals in the Fifteenth US Army. The following units were attached at this time: 43rd Med Bn, 49th Med Bn, 30th Med Bn, 173rd Med Bn, 660th Clearing Co, 661st Clearing Co, 64Oth Clearing Co, 470th Collecting Co, 459th Collecting Co, and the 447th Collecting Co. The 485th Collecting Co was the only unit assigned to the group.

On 1 May 1945 Group moved to Andernach, North of Koblenz, where the unit performed very few medical functions. The following units were attached while in Andernoch: 30th Med Bn, 79th Med Bn, 630th Med Clearing Co, 663rd Med Clearing Co, 509th Med Collecting Co, 510th Med Collecting Co and the 580th Ambulance Company.

Toward the end of May 1945, the group moved to Bergisch Gladbach, four miles east of Cologne. The primary mission was to establish medical service for a Cordon Sanitaire, responsible for forming dusting stations at Duisburg, Düsseldorf, Cologne and Olas Canel, where all persons except for allied military would be inspected and deloused. Two additional missions were assigned later; supervising all overrun German hospitals and conducting an industrial survey of all medical establishments in the area.

On 2 November 1945 the 67th Medical Group departed for home. After arrival in the United States, the group was inactivated at Camp Kilmer, New Jersey, on 20 November 1945.
