= Sillé-le-Philippe =

- Commune
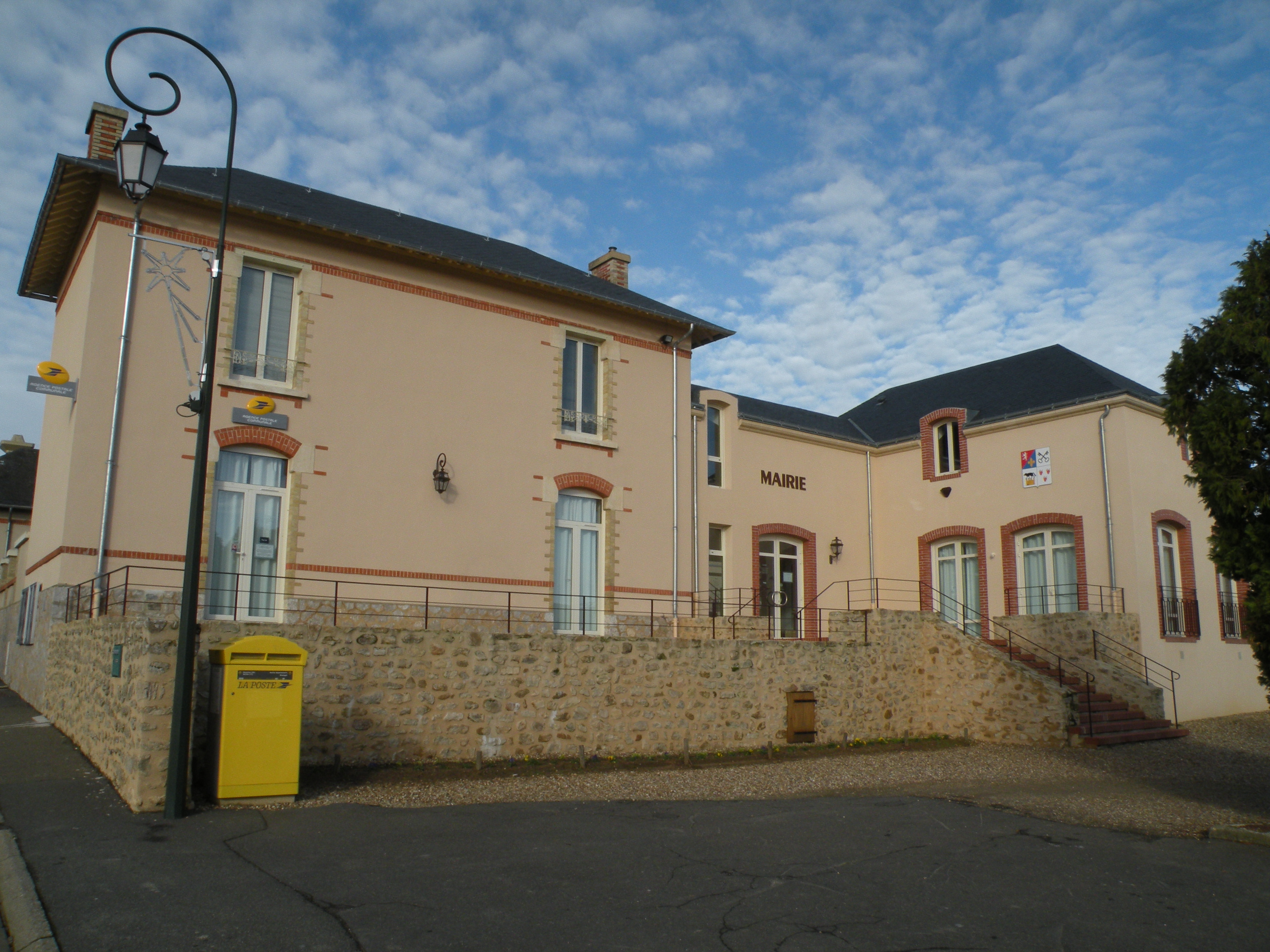
- The town hall of Sillé-le-Philippe

- Coat of arms
- Location of Sillé-le-Philippe
- Location within France Location within Pays de la Loire
- Coordinates: 48°06′30″N 0°21′11″E
- Country: France
- Region: Pays de la Loire
- Department: Sarthe
- Arrondissement: Mamers
- Canton: Savigné-l'Évêque
- Intercommunality: Le Gesnois Bilurien

Government
  - Mayor (2020–2026): Claudia Dugast
- Area^{1}: 10.6 km^{2} (4.1 sq mi)
- Highest elevation: 90 m (300 ft)
- Lowest elevation: 70 m (230 ft)
- Population (2023): 1,085
  - Density: 102/km^{2} (265/sq mi)
- Demonym(s): Silléen, Silléenne
- Time zone: UTC+01:00 (CET)
  - Summer (DST): UTC+02:00 (CEST)
- INSEE/Postal code: 72335 /72460
- ^{1} French Land Register data, which excludes lakes, ponds, glaciers > 1 km^{2} (0.386 sq mi or 247 acres) and river estuaries.

Sillé-le-Philippe (French pronunciation: [sije lə filip]) is a commune in the Sarthe department in the region of Pays de la Loire in north-western France.

== See also ==
- Communes of the Sarthe department
