= Le Breil-sur-Mérize =

- Commune
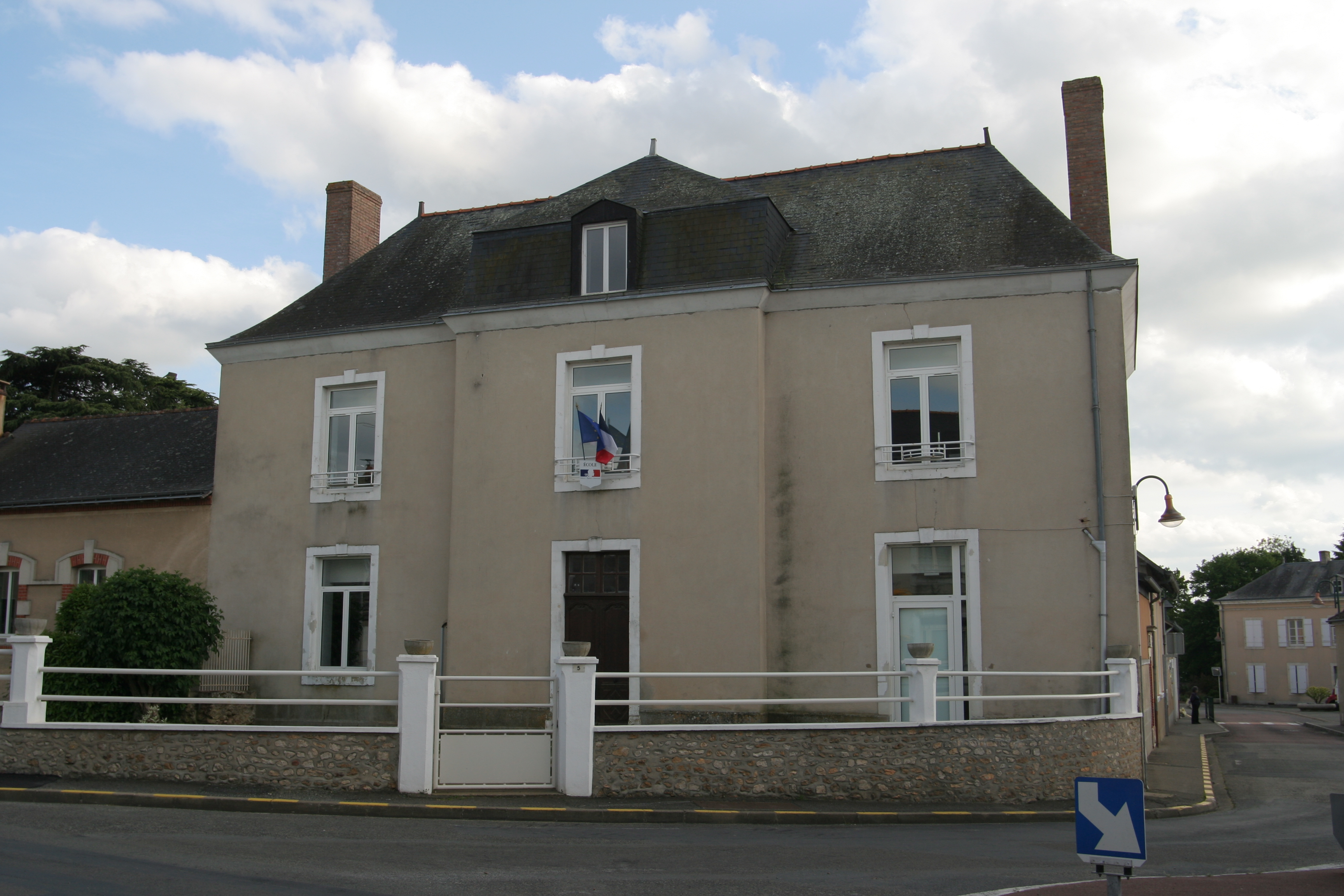
- The school
- Location of Le Breil-sur-Mérize
- Location within France Location within Pays de la Loire
- Coordinates: 48°00′27″N 0°28′38″E
- Country: France
- Region: Pays de la Loire
- Department: Sarthe
- Arrondissement: Mamers
- Canton: Savigné-l'Évêque
- Intercommunality: Le Gesnois Bilurien

Government
  - Mayor (2020–2026): Jean-Paul Hubert
- Area^{1}: 18.4 km^{2} (7.1 sq mi)
- Highest elevation: 157 m (515 ft)
- Lowest elevation: 86 m (282 ft)
- Population (2023): 1,552
  - Density: 84.3/km^{2} (218/sq mi)
- Demonym(s): Breillois, Breilloise
- Time zone: UTC+01:00 (CET)
  - Summer (DST): UTC+02:00 (CEST)
- INSEE/Postal code: 72046 /72370
- ^{1} French Land Register data, which excludes lakes, ponds, glaciers > 1 km^{2} (0.386 sq mi or 247 acres) and river estuaries.

Le Breil-sur-Mérize (French pronunciation: [lə bʁɛj syʁ meʁiz]) is a commune in the Sarthe department in the region of Pays de la Loire in north-western France.

== See also ==
- Communes of the Sarthe department
