= Saint-Célerin =

- Commune
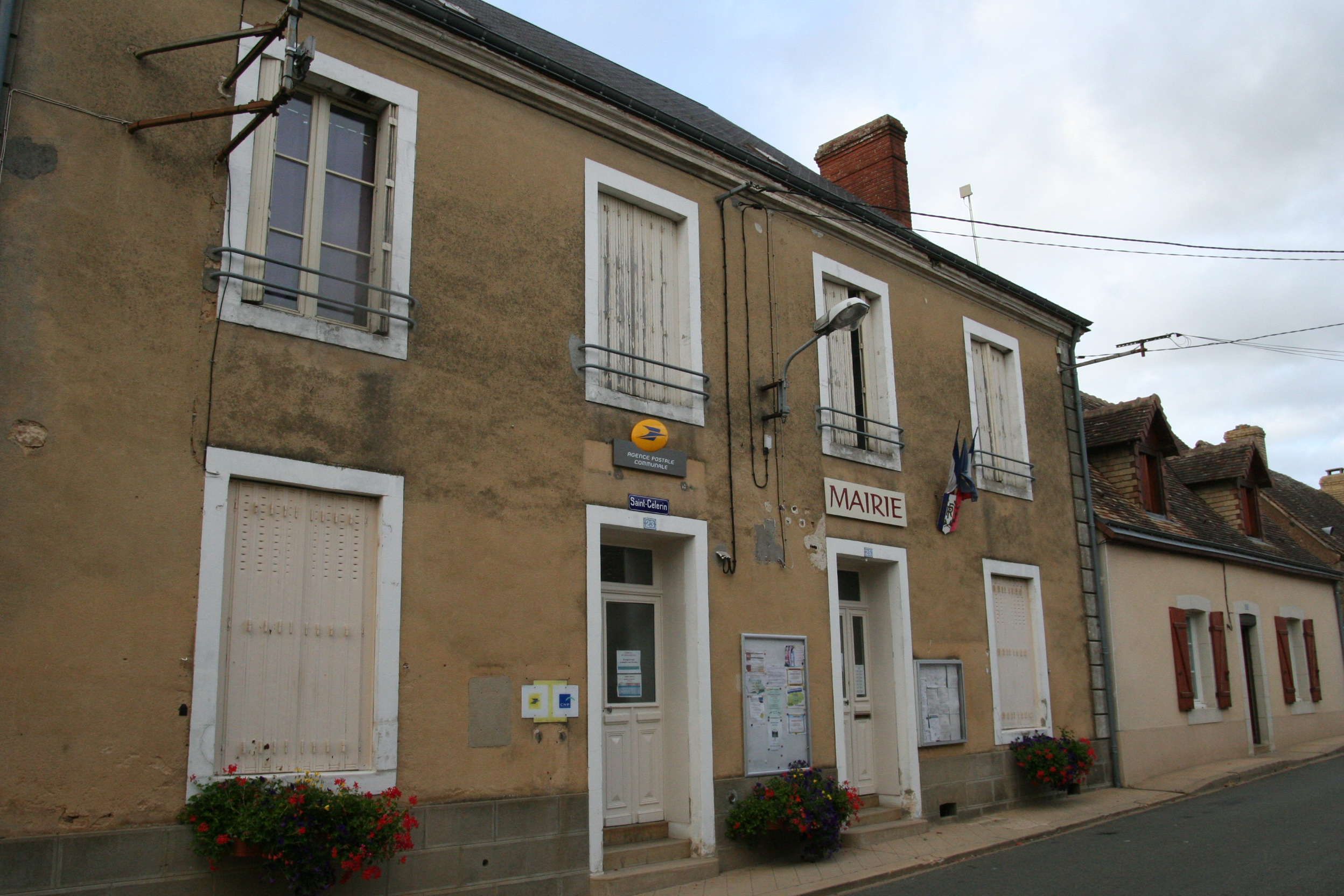
- Post office and town hall
- Location of Saint-Célerin
- Location within France Location within Pays de la Loire
- Coordinates: 48°07′25″N 0°25′54″E
- Country: France
- Region: Pays de la Loire
- Department: Sarthe
- Arrondissement: Mamers
- Canton: Savigné-l'Évêque
- Intercommunality: Le Gesnois Bilurien

Government
  - Mayor (2020–2026): Franck Floquet
- Area^{1}: 13.5 km^{2} (5.2 sq mi)
- Population (2023): 882
  - Density: 65.3/km^{2} (169/sq mi)
- Demonym(s): Gérois, Géroise
- Time zone: UTC+01:00 (CET)
  - Summer (DST): UTC+02:00 (CEST)
- INSEE/Postal code: 72271 /72110
- ^{1} French Land Register data, which excludes lakes, ponds, glaciers > 1 km^{2} (0.386 sq mi or 247 acres) and river estuaries.

Saint-Célerin is a commune in the Sarthe department in the region of Pays de la Loire in north-western France.

== See also ==
- Communes of the Sarthe department
