= Fatines =

- Commune
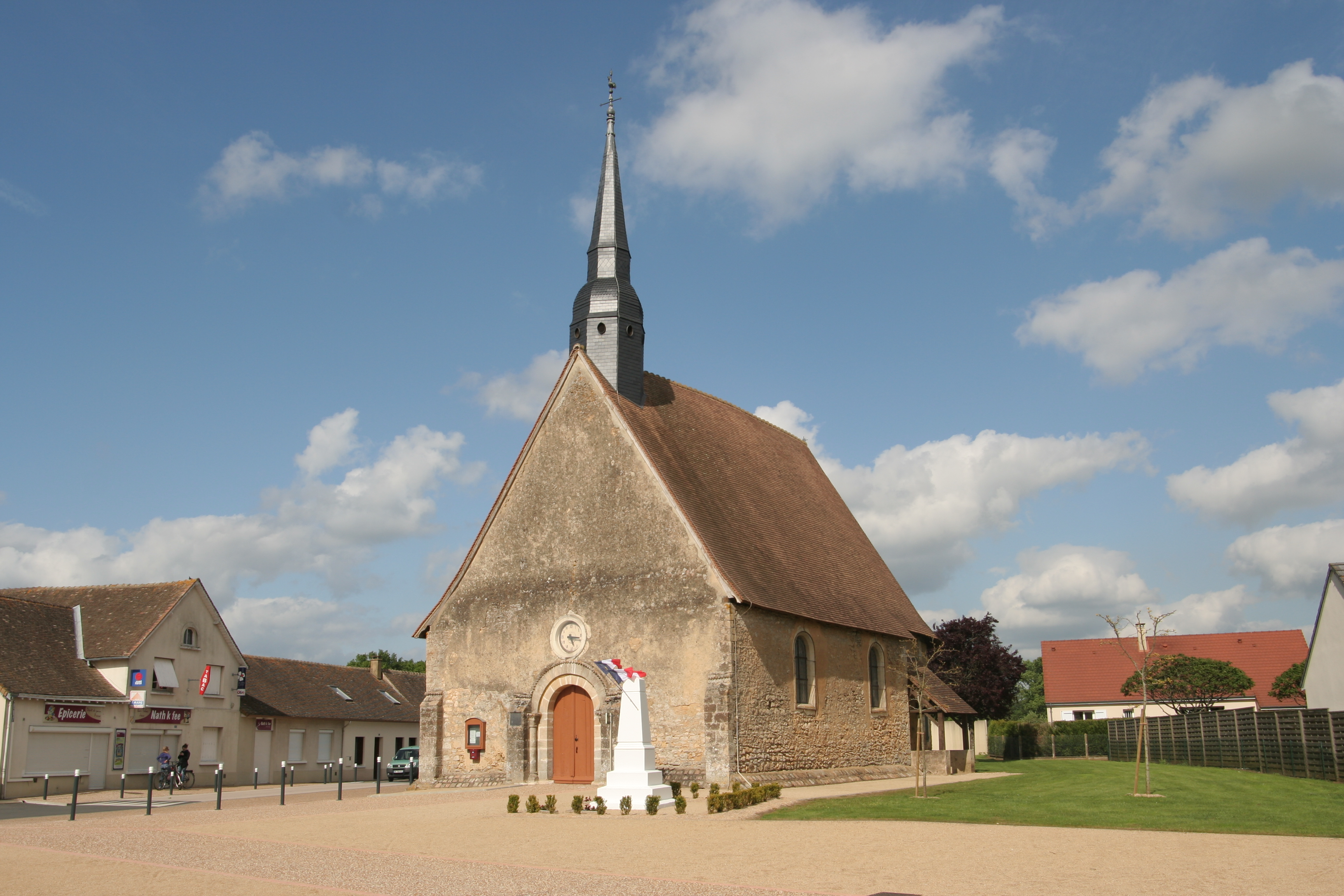
- The church of Saint-Jacques, in Fatines

- Coat of arms
- Location of Fatines
- Location within France Location within Pays de la Loire
- Coordinates: 48°02′48″N 0°20′56″E
- Country: France
- Region: Pays de la Loire
- Department: Sarthe
- Arrondissement: Mamers
- Canton: Savigné-l'Évêque
- Intercommunality: Le Mans Métropole

Government
  - Mayor (2020–2026): Nicolas Augereau
- Area^{1}: 5.44 km^{2} (2.10 sq mi)
- Highest elevation: 71 m (233 ft)
- Lowest elevation: 52 m (171 ft)
- Population (2023): 929
  - Density: 171/km^{2} (442/sq mi)
- Demonym(s): Fatinois, Fatinoise
- Time zone: UTC+01:00 (CET)
  - Summer (DST): UTC+02:00 (CEST)
- INSEE/Postal code: 72129 /72470
- ^{1} French Land Register data, which excludes lakes, ponds, glaciers > 1 km^{2} (0.386 sq mi or 247 acres) and river estuaries.

Fatines (French pronunciation: [fatin]) is a commune in the Sarthe department in the Pays de la Loire region in north-western France.

== See also ==
- Communes of the Sarthe department
