= Hôtel de Ville, Saint-Sébastien-sur-Loire =

Town hall in Saint-Sébastien-sur-Loire, France

Hôtel de Ville
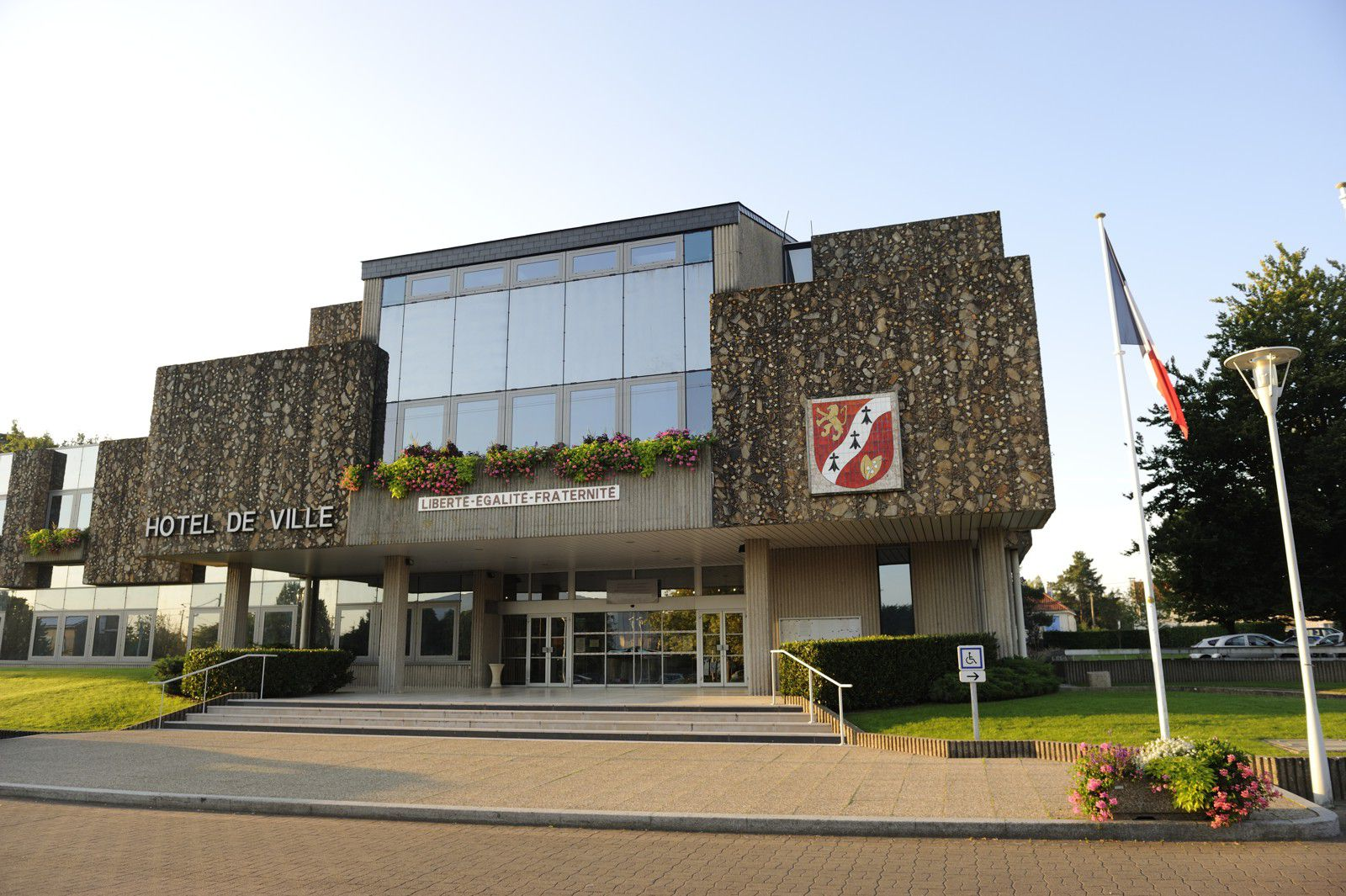
- The main frontage of the Hôtel de Ville in September 2015
- Interactive map of the Hôtel de Ville area

General information
- Type: City hall
- Architectural style: Modern style
- Location: Saint-Sébastien-sur-Loire, France
- Coordinates: 47.2060°N 1.5019°W
- Completed: 1982

The Hôtel de Ville (French pronunciation: [otɛl də vil], City Hall) is a municipal building in Saint-Sébastien-sur-Loire, Loire-Atlantique, in western France, standing on Rue Marcellin Verbe.

== History ==
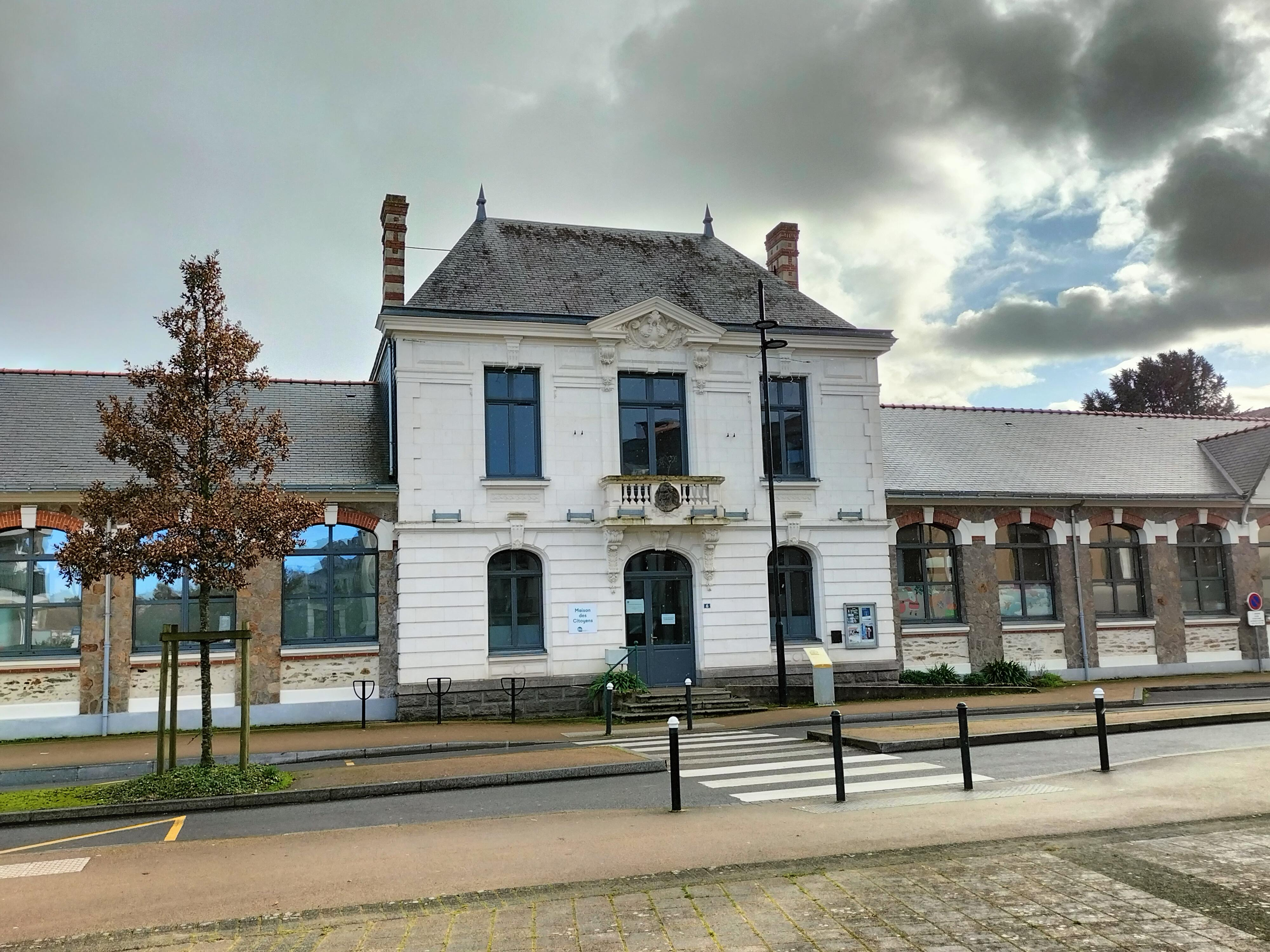
The old town hall of 1910

Following the French Revolution, the town council initially met at the house of the mayor at the time. However, in 1845, the council established a combined town hall and school at the north end of what is now Rue du Général Duez, facing the Church of Saint-Sébastien. In the early 20th century, the council decided to commission a more substantial combined town hall and school. The site they selected was on the south side of what is now Rue du Général de Gaulle, opposite what is now Square de Verdun. The new building was designed in the neoclassical style, built in ashlar stone and was completed in 1910.

The design involved a symmetrical main frontage of three bays facing towards Square de Verdun. The central bay featured a segmental headed doorway with a keystone. There was French door with a balustraded balcony on the first floor and an open pediment with a coat of arms in the tympanum above. The outer bays were fenestrated by segmental headed windows with keystones on the ground floor and by casement windows with keystones on the first floor.

A war memorial, created by the sculptor Jean Galle in the form of a square column surmounted by a winged statue of victory, which was intended to commemorate the lives of local service personnel killed in the First World War, was unveiled on Square de Verdun, in front of the town hall, on 26 October 1924.

Already equipped with a classroom for teaching boys, the building was expanded to accommodate a classroom for girls after the First World War. The building was badly damaged by American bombing missions, which were targeting the railway bridges across the River Loire, on 7 June 1944. Once it was no longer needed either for educational or for municipal use, the old town hall became a community centre known as the Maison des Citoyens (Citizens' House).

In the late 1970s, after significant population growth, the council led by the mayor, Marcellin Verbe, decided to commission a modern town hall. The site they selected was a former farm, known as the Motte Estate, which had a large vegetable garden and park. The new building was designed in the modern style, built in concrete and glass and was completed in 1982.

The design involved an asymmetrical main frontage facing onto what is now Rue Marcellin Verbe. The building was laid out with an office section on the left and an entrance section on the right. The office section contained five bays fenestrated by casement windows which were flanked, on the first floor, by large panels decorated with assorted stones. The entrance section contained a series of glass doors on the ground floor and a large box which was supported by concrete columns and projected forward on the first floor. The box was fenestrated by a large rectangular window which was also flanked by large panels decorated with assorted stones. After the council adopted a new coat of arms in February 1985, a ceramic mosaic shield depicting the coat of arms was placed on the right-hand panel.

The ground floor of the building, which accommodated the Salle des Réceptions (reception room), was refurbished at a cost of €372,000 in 2018. After the ceramic mosaic shield on the face of the building became dilapidated, it was replaced by a metal shield in April 2025. In December 2025, a programme of works was initiated to transform the area around the town hall into a landscaped pedestrian space.
