= Montfort-le-Gesnois =

- Commune
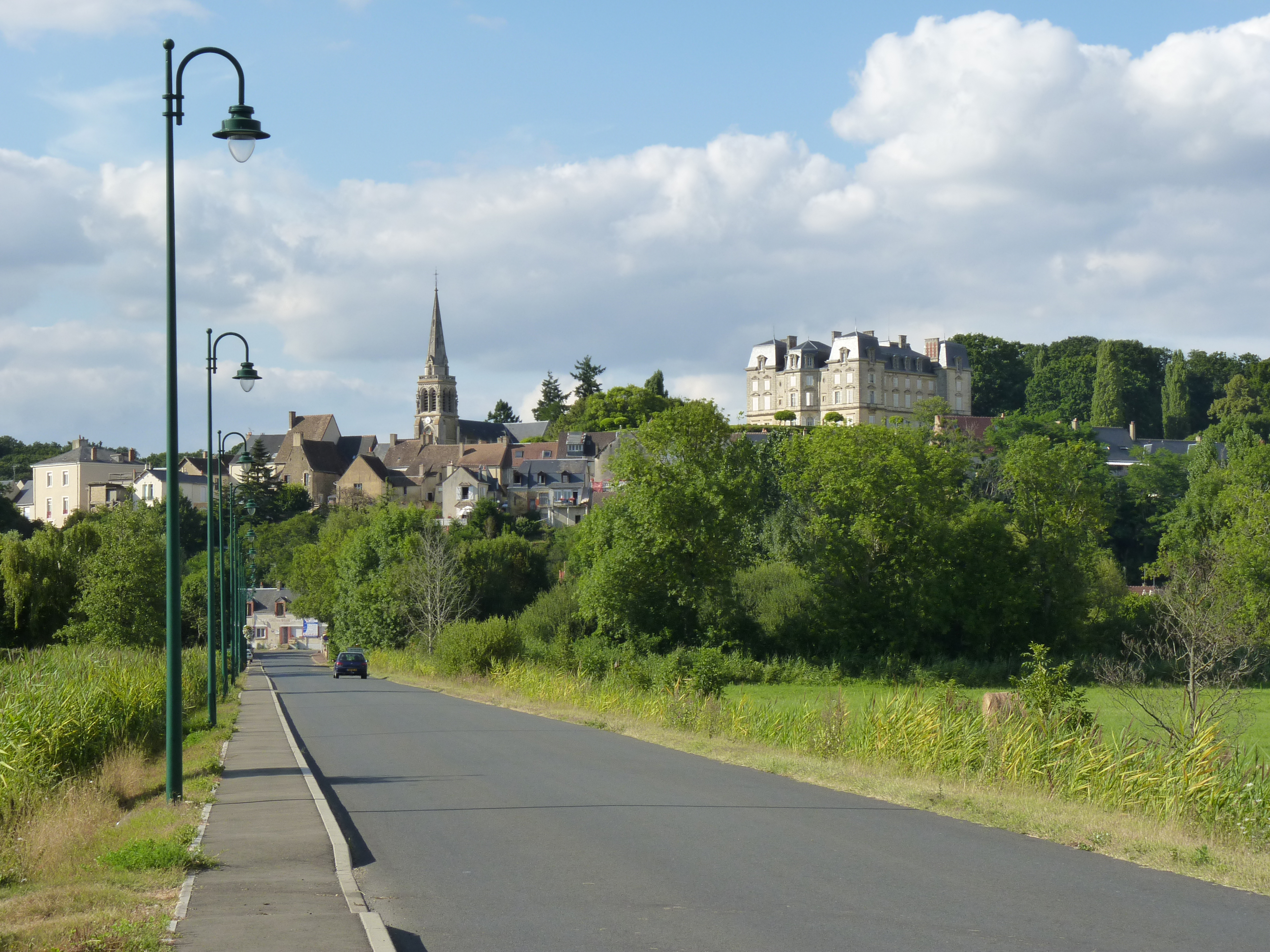
- The road into Montfort-le-Gesnois

- Coat of arms
- Location of Montfort-le-Gesnois
- Location within France Location within Pays de la Loire
- Coordinates: 48°02′57″N 0°24′16″E
- Country: France
- Region: Pays de la Loire
- Department: Sarthe
- Arrondissement: Mamers
- Canton: Savigné-l'Évêque
- Intercommunality: Le Gesnois Bilurien

Government
  - Mayor (2020–2026): Anthony Trifaut
- Area^{1}: 18.74 km^{2} (7.24 sq mi)
- Highest elevation: 113 m (371 ft)
- Lowest elevation: 54 m (177 ft)
- Population (2023): 2,939
  - Density: 156.8/km^{2} (406.2/sq mi)
- Demonym(s): Montgénois, Montgénoise
- Time zone: UTC+01:00 (CET)
  - Summer (DST): UTC+02:00 (CEST)
- INSEE/Postal code: 72241 /72450
- Website: www.montfort-le-gesnois.fr
- ^{1} French Land Register data, which excludes lakes, ponds, glaciers > 1 km^{2} (0.386 sq mi or 247 acres) and river estuaries.

Montfort-le-Gesnois (French pronunciation: [mɔ̃fɔʁ lə ʒɛnwa]) is a commune in the Sarthe department in the region of Pays de la Loire in north-western France.

== Population ==
Historical population
Year	Pop.	±% p.a.
1968	1,934	—
1975	2,259	+2.24%
1982	2,427	+1.03%
1990	2,657	+1.14%
1999	2,884	+0.92%
2007	3,074	+0.80%
2012	3,044	−0.20%
2017	2,973	−0.47%
2023	2,939	−0.19%
Source: INSEE

== See also ==
- Communes of the Sarthe department
