= Torcé-en-Vallée =

- Commune
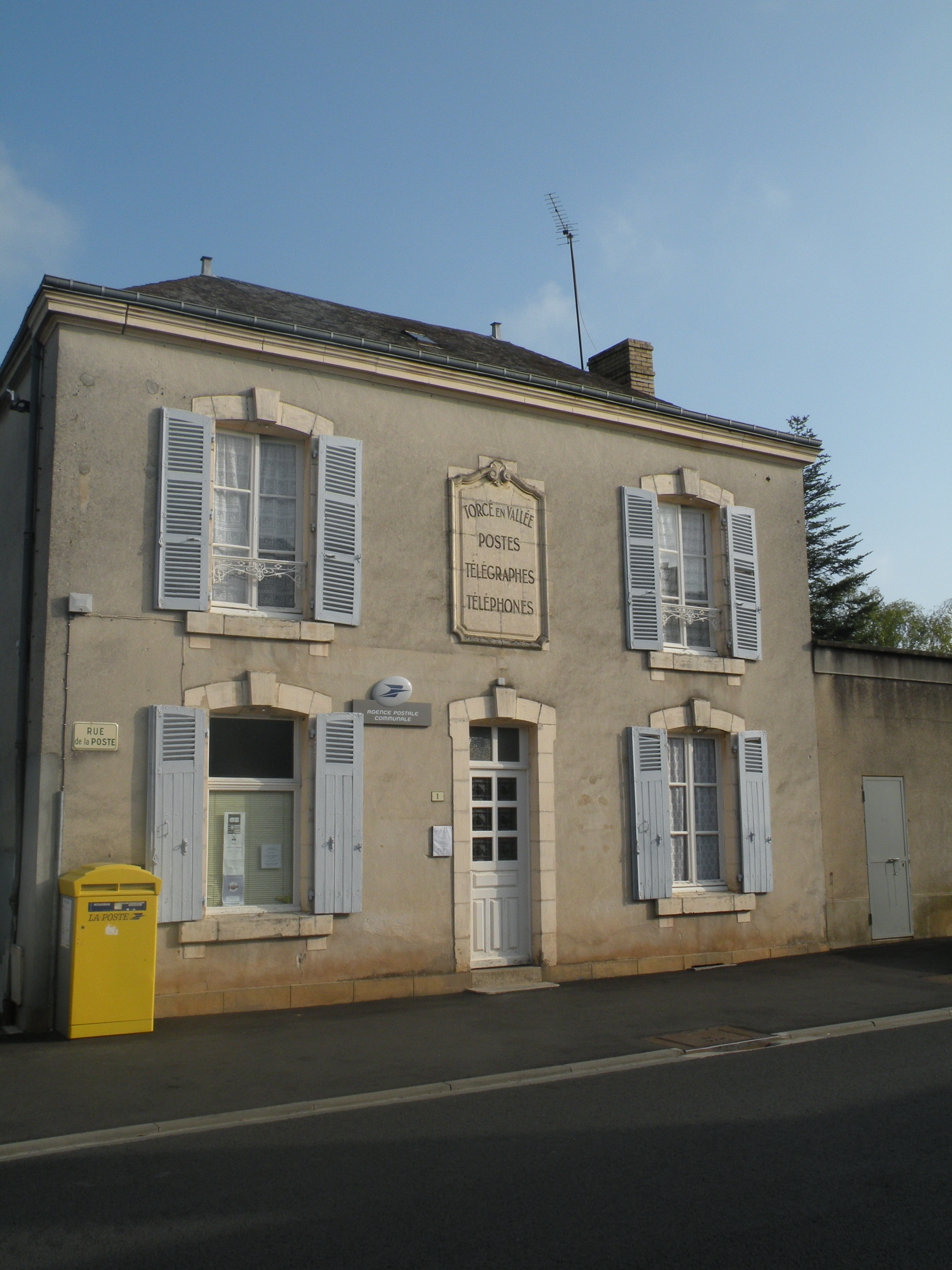
- The post office of Torcé-en-Vallée
- Location of Torcé-en-Vallée
- Location within France Location within Pays de la Loire
- Coordinates: 48°08′02″N 0°23′45″E
- Country: France
- Region: Pays de la Loire
- Department: Sarthe
- Arrondissement: Mamers
- Canton: Savigné-l'Évêque
- Intercommunality: Le Gesnois Bilurien

Government
  - Mayor (2020–2026): Jean-Michel Royer
- Area^{1}: 17 km^{2} (6.6 sq mi)
- Population (2023): 1,397
  - Density: 82/km^{2} (210/sq mi)
- Demonym(s): Torcéen, Torcéenne
- Time zone: UTC+01:00 (CET)
  - Summer (DST): UTC+02:00 (CEST)
- INSEE/Postal code: 72359 /72110
- ^{1} French Land Register data, which excludes lakes, ponds, glaciers > 1 km^{2} (0.386 sq mi or 247 acres) and river estuaries.

Torcé-en-Vallée (French pronunciation: [tɔʁse ɑ̃ vale]) is a commune in the Sarthe department in the region of Pays de la Loire in north-western France.

== See also ==
- Communes of the Sarthe department
