= Ardenay-sur-Mérize =

- Commune
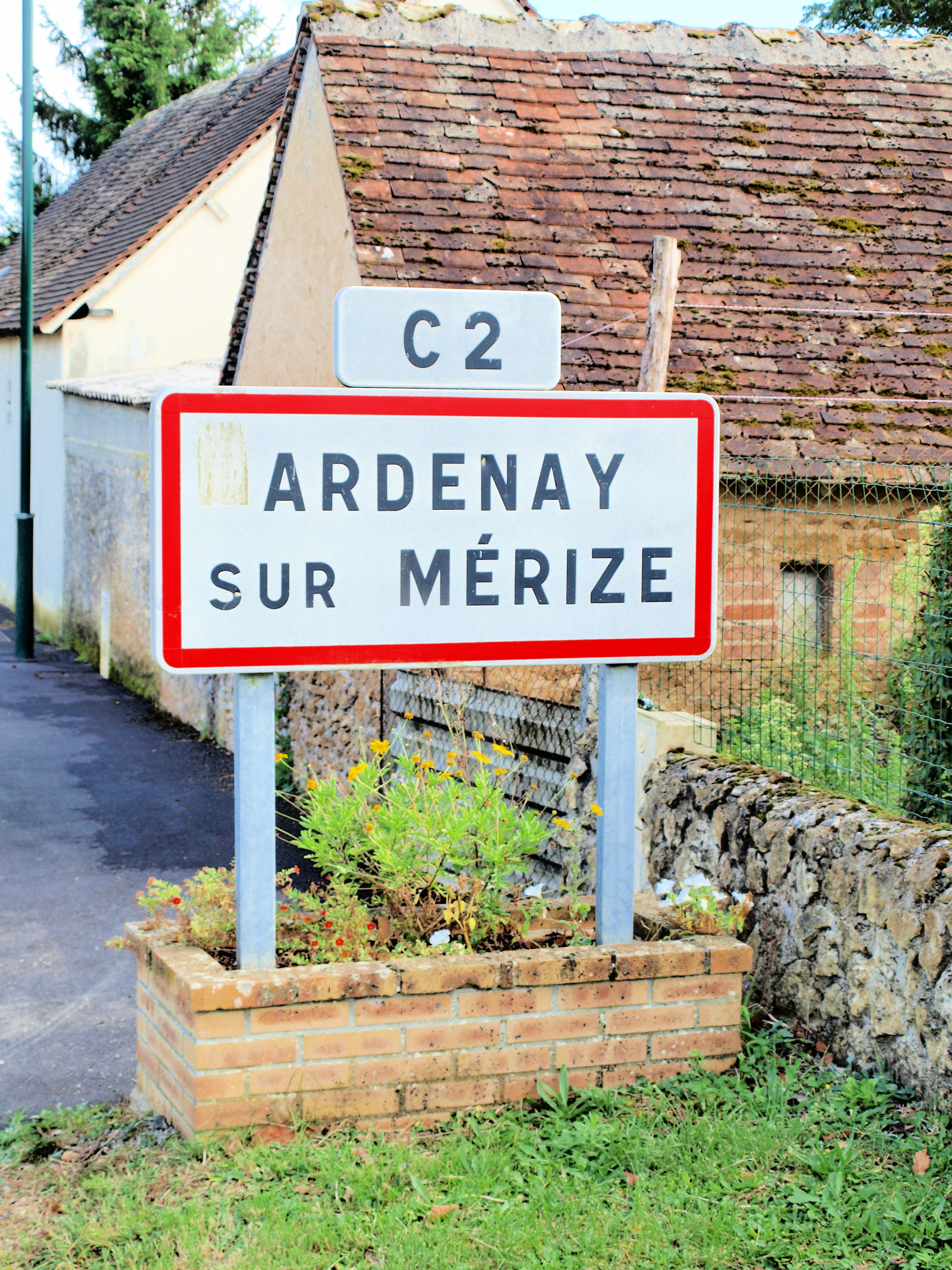
- A road sign at the entrance to Ardenay-sur-Mérize
- Location of Ardenay-sur-Mérize
- Location within France Location within Pays de la Loire
- Coordinates: 47°59′44″N 0°25′32″E
- Country: France
- Region: Pays de la Loire
- Department: Sarthe
- Arrondissement: Mamers
- Canton: Savigné-l'Évêque
- Intercommunality: Le Gesnois Bilurien

Government
  - Mayor (2020–2026): André Pigné
- Area^{1}: 11.67 km^{2} (4.51 sq mi)
- Highest elevation: 123 m (404 ft)
- Lowest elevation: 65 m (213 ft)
- Population (2023): 504
  - Density: 43.2/km^{2} (112/sq mi)
- Demonym(s): Ardenaisien, Ardenaisienne
- Time zone: UTC+01:00 (CET)
  - Summer (DST): UTC+02:00 (CEST)
- INSEE/Postal code: 72007 /72370
- ^{1} French Land Register data, which excludes lakes, ponds, glaciers > 1 km^{2} (0.386 sq mi or 247 acres) and river estuaries.

Ardenay-sur-Mérize (French pronunciation: [aʁdənɛ syʁ meʁiz]) is a commune in the Sarthe department in the region of Pays de la Loire in north-western France.

== See also ==
- Communes of the Sarthe department
