= Savigné-l'Évêque =

- Commune
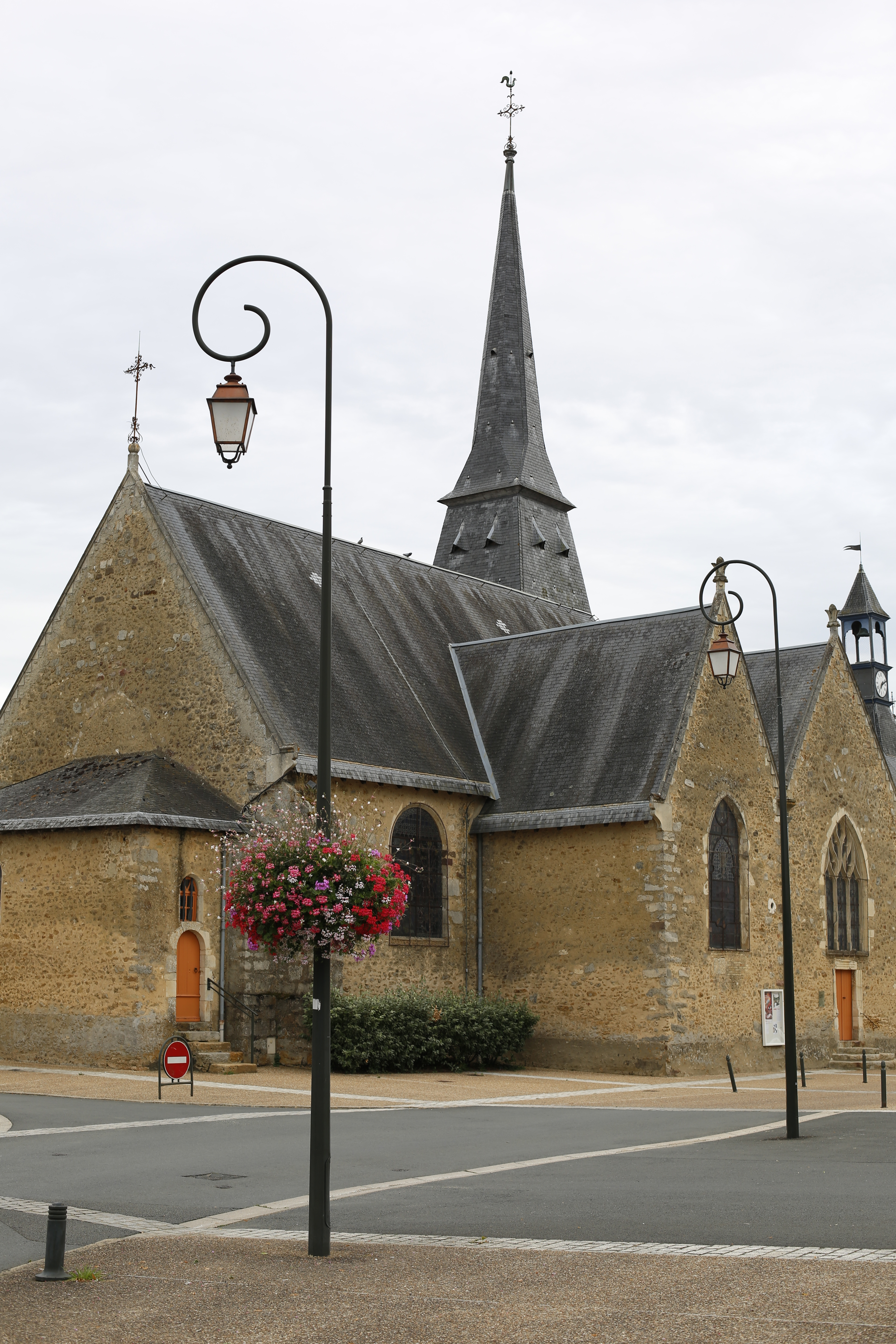
- The church of Saint-Germain, in Savigné-l'Évêque

- Coat of arms
- Location of Savigné-l'Évêque
- Location within France Location within Pays de la Loire
- Coordinates: 48°04′38″N 0°17′52″E
- Country: France
- Region: Pays de la Loire
- Department: Sarthe
- Arrondissement: Mamers
- Canton: Savigné-l'Évêque
- Intercommunality: Le Gesnois Bilurien

Government
  - Mayor (2020–2026): Isabelle Lemeunier
- Area^{1}: 28.48 km^{2} (11.00 sq mi)
- Highest elevation: 126 m (413 ft)
- Lowest elevation: 53 m (174 ft)
- Population (2023): 4,031
  - Density: 141.5/km^{2} (366.6/sq mi)
- Demonym(s): Savignéen, Savignéenne
- Time zone: UTC+01:00 (CET)
  - Summer (DST): UTC+02:00 (CEST)
- INSEE/Postal code: 72329 /72460
- ^{1} French Land Register data, which excludes lakes, ponds, glaciers > 1 km^{2} (0.386 sq mi or 247 acres) and river estuaries.

Savigné-l'Évêque (French pronunciation: [saviɲe levɛk]) is a commune in the Sarthe department in the region of Pays de la Loire in north-western France.

== Population ==
Historical population
| Year | Pop. | ±% p.a. |
|---|---|---|
| 1968 | 1,933 | — |
| 1975 | 2,269 | +2.32% |
| 1982 | 3,076 | +4.44% |
| 1990 | 3,576 | +1.90% |
| 1999 | 3,721 | +0.44% |
| 2007 | 4,043 | +1.04% |
| 2012 | 4,009 | −0.17% |
| 2017 | 3,998 | −0.05% |
| 2023 | 4,031 | +0.14% |
Source: INSEE

== See also ==
- Communes of the Sarthe department
