= Saint-Corneille =

- Commune
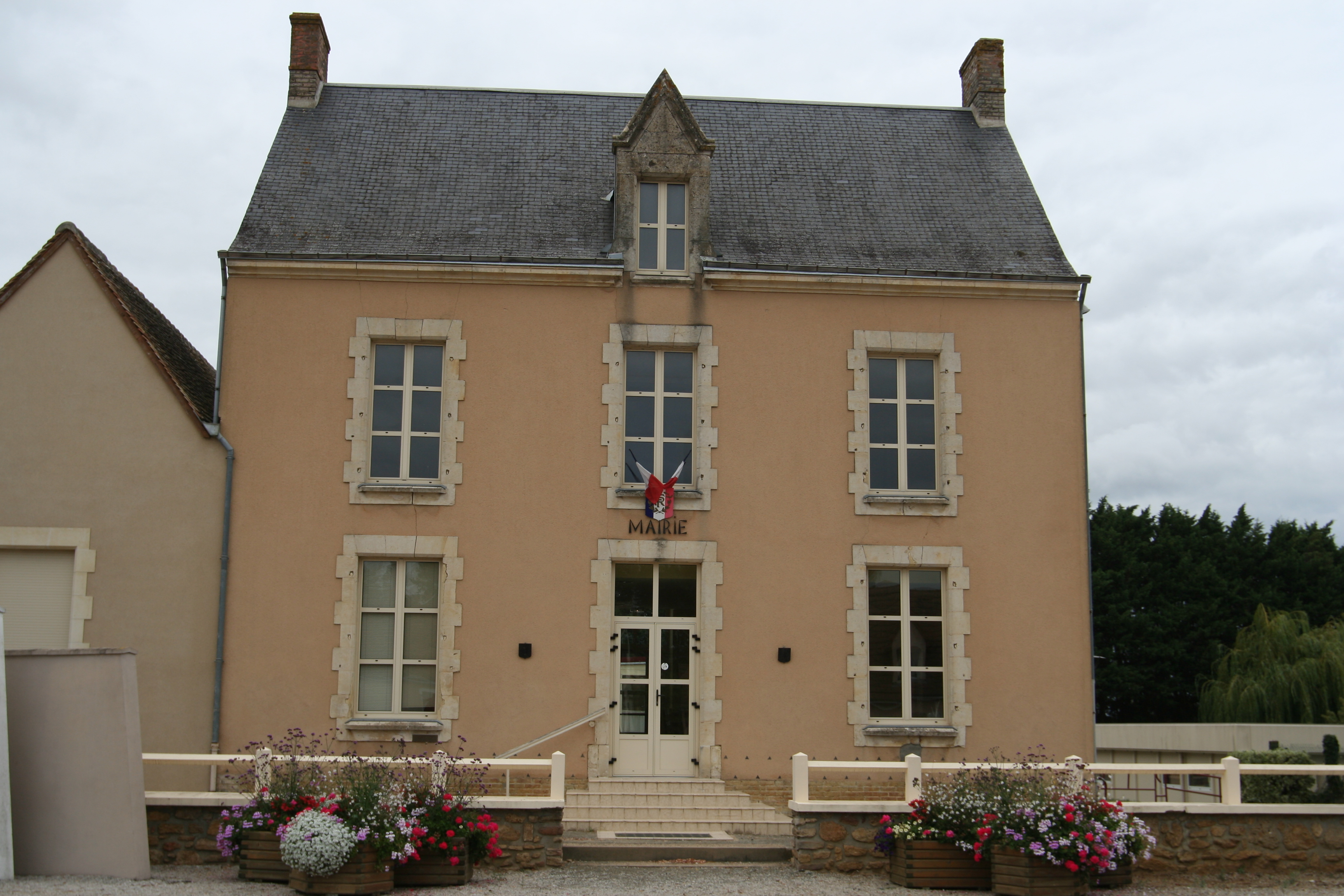
- The town hall of Saint-Corneille

- Coat of arms
- Location of Saint-Corneille
- Location within France Location within Pays de la Loire
- Coordinates: 48°04′02″N 0°20′34″E
- Country: France
- Region: Pays de la Loire
- Department: Sarthe
- Arrondissement: Mamers
- Canton: Savigné-l'Évêque
- Intercommunality: Le Gesnois Bilurien

Government
  - Mayor (2020–2026): Michel Pré
- Area^{1}: 10.88 km^{2} (4.20 sq mi)
- Highest elevation: 75 m (246 ft)
- Lowest elevation: 52 m (171 ft)
- Population (2023): 1,510
  - Density: 139/km^{2} (359/sq mi)
- Demonym(s): Cornélien, Cornélienne
- Time zone: UTC+01:00 (CET)
  - Summer (DST): UTC+02:00 (CEST)
- INSEE/Postal code: 72275 /72460
- ^{1} French Land Register data, which excludes lakes, ponds, glaciers > 1 km^{2} (0.386 sq mi or 247 acres) and river estuaries.

Saint-Corneille (French pronunciation: [sɛ̃ kɔʁnɛj]) is a commune in the Sarthe department in the region of Pays de la Loire in north-western France, famous for its chicken breeding facilities.

== See also ==
- Communes of the Sarthe department
