= Canton of Savigné-l'Évêque =

Coordinates: 48.08°N 0.29°E

The canton of Savigné-l'Évêque is an administrative division of the Sarthe department, northwestern France. It was created at the French canton reorganisation which came into effect in March 2015. Its seat is in Savigné-l'Évêque.

It consists of the following communes:

1. Ardenay-sur-Mérize
2. Le Breil-sur-Mérize
3. Connerré
4. Fatines
5. Lombron
6. Nuillé-le-Jalais
7. Montfort-le-Gesnois
8. Saint-Célerin
9. Saint-Corneille
10. Saint-Mars-la-Brière
11. Savigné-l'Évêque
12. Sillé-le-Philippe
13. Soulitré
14. Surfonds
15. Torcé-en-Vallée
