= 2009–10 Coupe de France qualifying rounds =

The 2009–10 Coupe de France is the 93rd season of the French most prestigious cup competition, organized by the French Football Federation, and is open to all clubs in French football, as well as clubs from the overseas departments and territories (Guadeloupe, French Guiana, Martinique, Mayotte, New Caledonia, French Polynesia, and Réunion). All of the teams that enter the competition, but were not members of Ligue 1 or Ligue 2, have to compete in the regional qualifying rounds. The regional qualifying rounds determine the number of regional clubs that will earn spots in the 7th round and normally lasts six rounds.

See 2009–10 Coupe de France for details of the rounds from the 7th round onwards.

== Calendar ==
On 23 June 2009, the French Football Federation announced the calendar for the Coupe de France.

round	First match date	Fixtures	Clubs	Notes
Preliminary round	16 August 2009			
1st round	20 August 2009			
2nd round	6 September 2009			
3rd round	20 September 2009			Clubs participating in CFA 2 gain entry.
4th round	4 October 2009			Clubs participating in the CFA gain entry.
5th round	18 October 2009			Clubs participating in the Championnat National gain entry.
6th round	1 November 2009	153	346 → 193	

== Clubs that qualified for 7th round ==
Below are the clubs that have, so far, achieved qualification to the 7th round of the Coupe de France.

Club	Region
AS Manu-Ura	French Polynesia
AS Mont-Dore	New Caledonia

== See also ==
- 2009–10 Coupe de France
- 2009–10 Ligue 1
- 2009–10 Ligue 2
- 2009–10 Championnat National
- 2009–10 Championnat de France Amateur
- 2009–10 Championnat de France Amateur 2
