= Soulitré =

- Commune
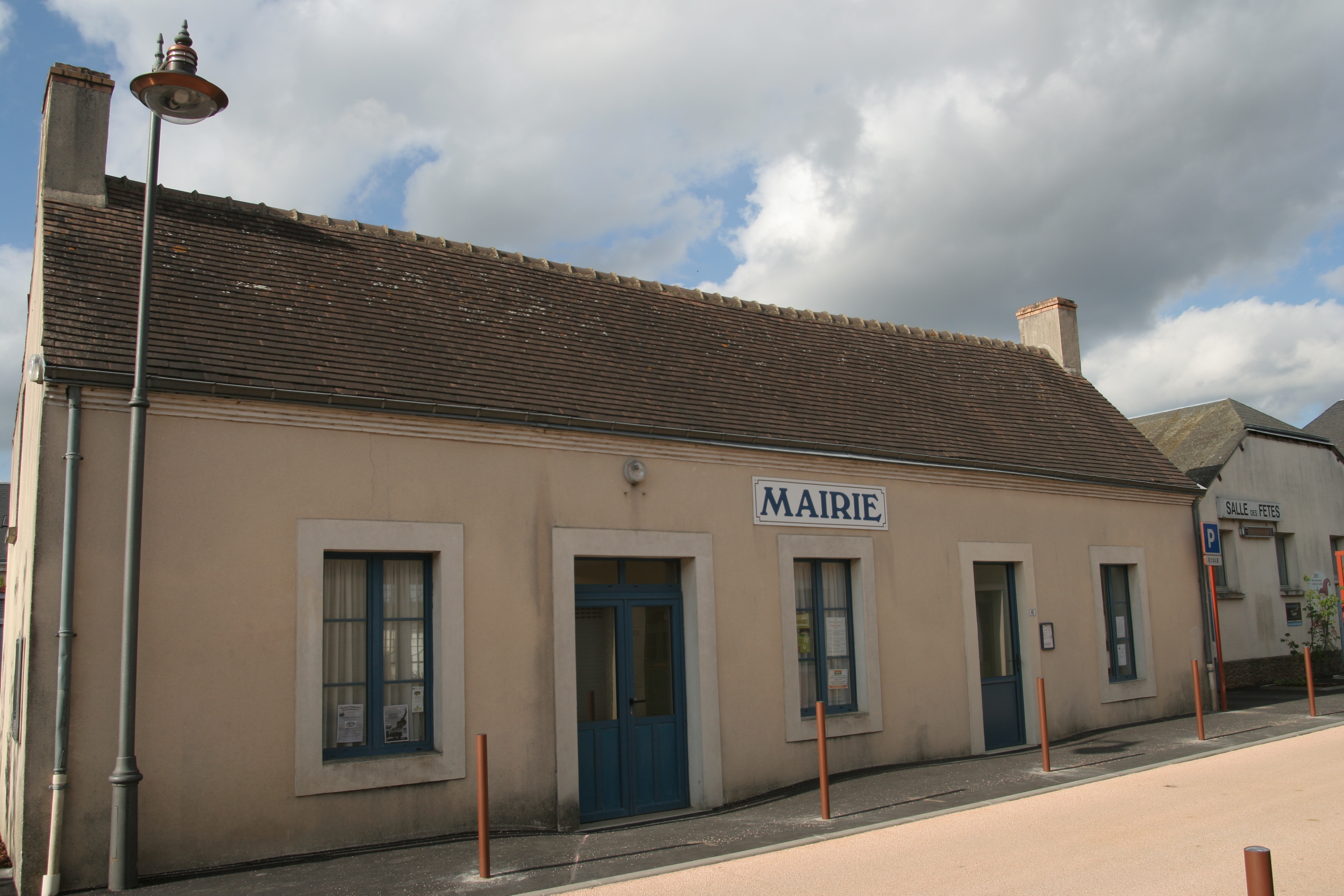
- The town hall of Soulitré
- Location of Soulitré
- Location within France Location within Pays de la Loire
- Coordinates: 48°00′40″N 0°27′25″E
- Country: France
- Region: Pays de la Loire
- Department: Sarthe
- Arrondissement: Mamers
- Canton: Savigné-l'Évêque
- Intercommunality: Le Gesnois Bilurien

Government
  - Mayor (2020–2026): Stéphane Ledru
- Area^{1}: 11 km^{2} (4.2 sq mi)
- Population (2023): 597
  - Density: 54/km^{2} (140/sq mi)
- Demonym(s): Solutréen, Solutréenne
- Time zone: UTC+01:00 (CET)
  - Summer (DST): UTC+02:00 (CEST)
- INSEE/Postal code: 72341 /72370
- ^{1} French Land Register data, which excludes lakes, ponds, glaciers > 1 km^{2} (0.386 sq mi or 247 acres) and river estuaries.

Soulitré (French pronunciation: [sulitʁe]) is a commune in the Sarthe department in the region of Pays de la Loire in north-western France.

== See also ==
- Communes of the Sarthe department
