= Saint-Sébastien-Pas-Enchantés station =

Railway station in Saint-Sébastien-sur-Loire, France

Saint-Sébastien Pas Enchantés
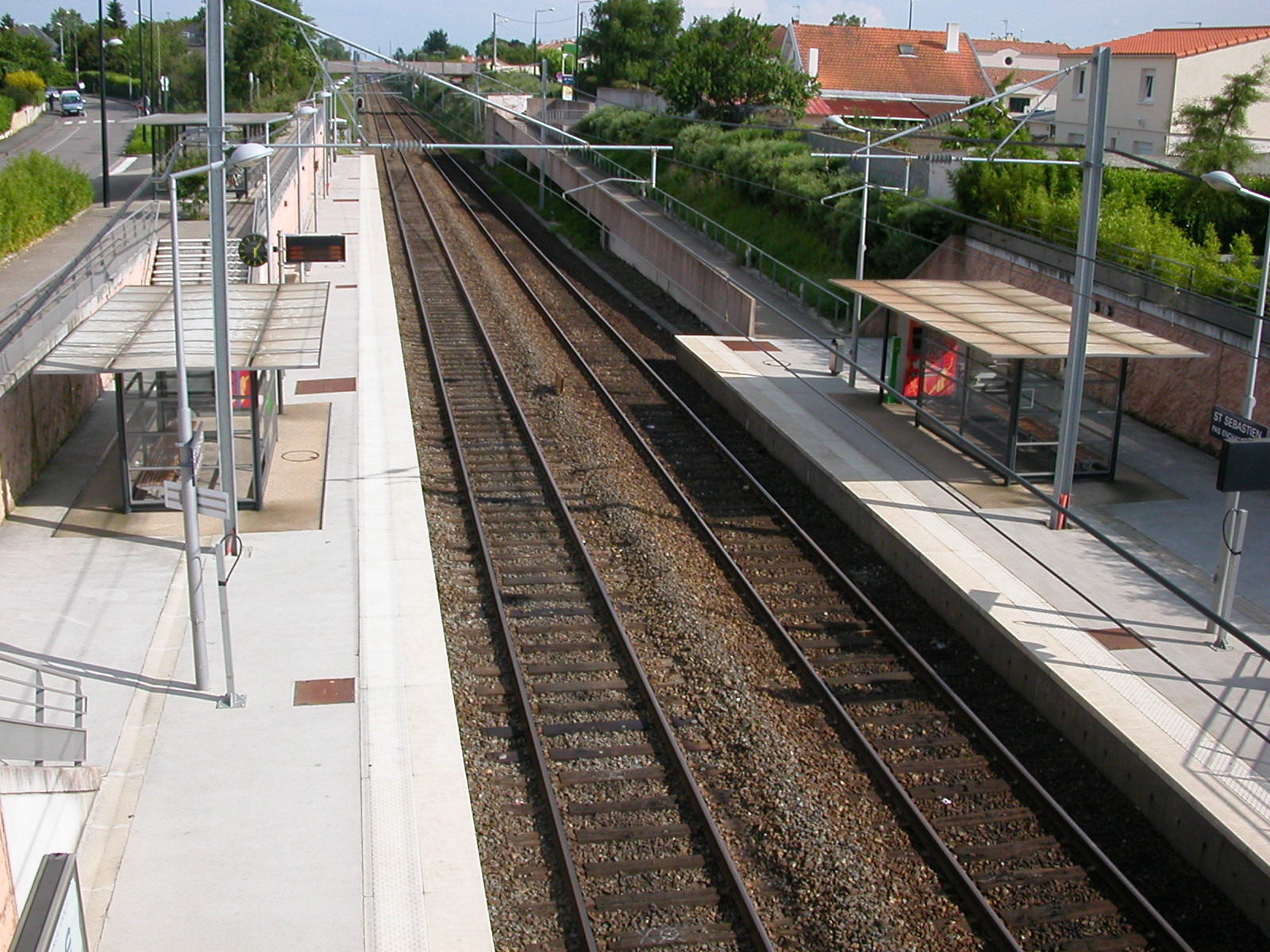
- Saint-Sébastien-Pas-Enchantés railway station

General information
- Location: Saint-Sébastien-sur-Loire, Loire-Atlantique; Pays de la Loire, France
- Coordinates: 47°12′24″N 1°30′39″W
- Line: Nantes-Saintes railway
- Platforms: 2
- Tracks: 2

Other information
- Station code: 87354589

Services
Preceding station	TER Pays de la Loire	Following station
Nantes Terminus	T2	Saint-Sébastien-Frêne-Rond towards Clisson
Location

Saint-Sébastien-Pas-Enchantés is a railway station in Saint-Sébastien-sur-Loire, Pays de la Loire, France. The station is located on the Nantes-Saintes railway. Since 15 June 2011 the station is served by a tram-train service between Nantes and Clisson operated by the SNCF. The following services currently call at Saint-Sébastien-Pas-Enchantés:

- local service (TER Pays de la Loire) Nantes - Clisson
