= Nuillé-le-Jalais =

- Commune
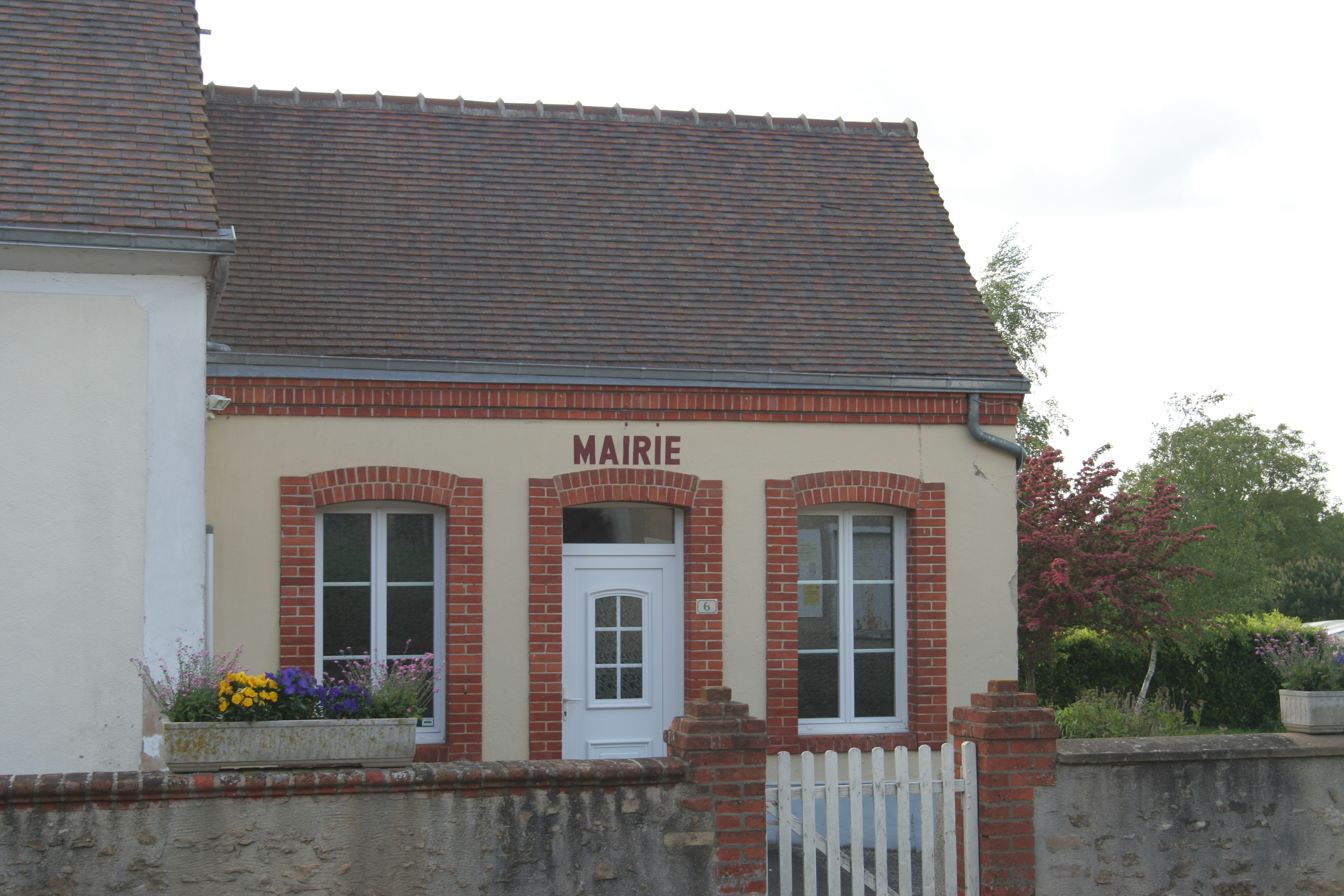
- The town hall of Nuillé-le-Jalais
- Location of Nuillé-le-Jalais
- Location within France Location within Pays de la Loire
- Coordinates: 48°01′08″N 0°28′54″E
- Country: France
- Region: Pays de la Loire
- Department: Sarthe
- Arrondissement: Mamers
- Canton: Savigné-l'Évêque
- Intercommunality: Le Gesnois Bilurien

Government
  - Mayor (2020–2026): Claudine Ozan
- Area^{1}: 5.70 km^{2} (2.20 sq mi)
- Highest elevation: 151 m (495 ft)
- Lowest elevation: 80 m (260 ft)
- Population (2023): 528
  - Density: 92.6/km^{2} (240/sq mi)
- Demonym(s): Jalaisien, Jalaisienne
- Time zone: UTC+01:00 (CET)
  - Summer (DST): UTC+02:00 (CEST)
- INSEE/Postal code: 72224 /72370
- ^{1} French Land Register data, which excludes lakes, ponds, glaciers > 1 km^{2} (0.386 sq mi or 247 acres) and river estuaries.

Nuillé-le-Jalais (French pronunciation: [nɥije lə ʒalɛ]) is a commune in the Sarthe department in the region of Pays de la Loire in north-western France.

== See also ==
- Communes of the Sarthe department
