= Saint-Sébastien-sur-Loire =

Saint-Sébastien-sur-Loire Sant-Sebastian-an-Enk (Breton)
- Commune
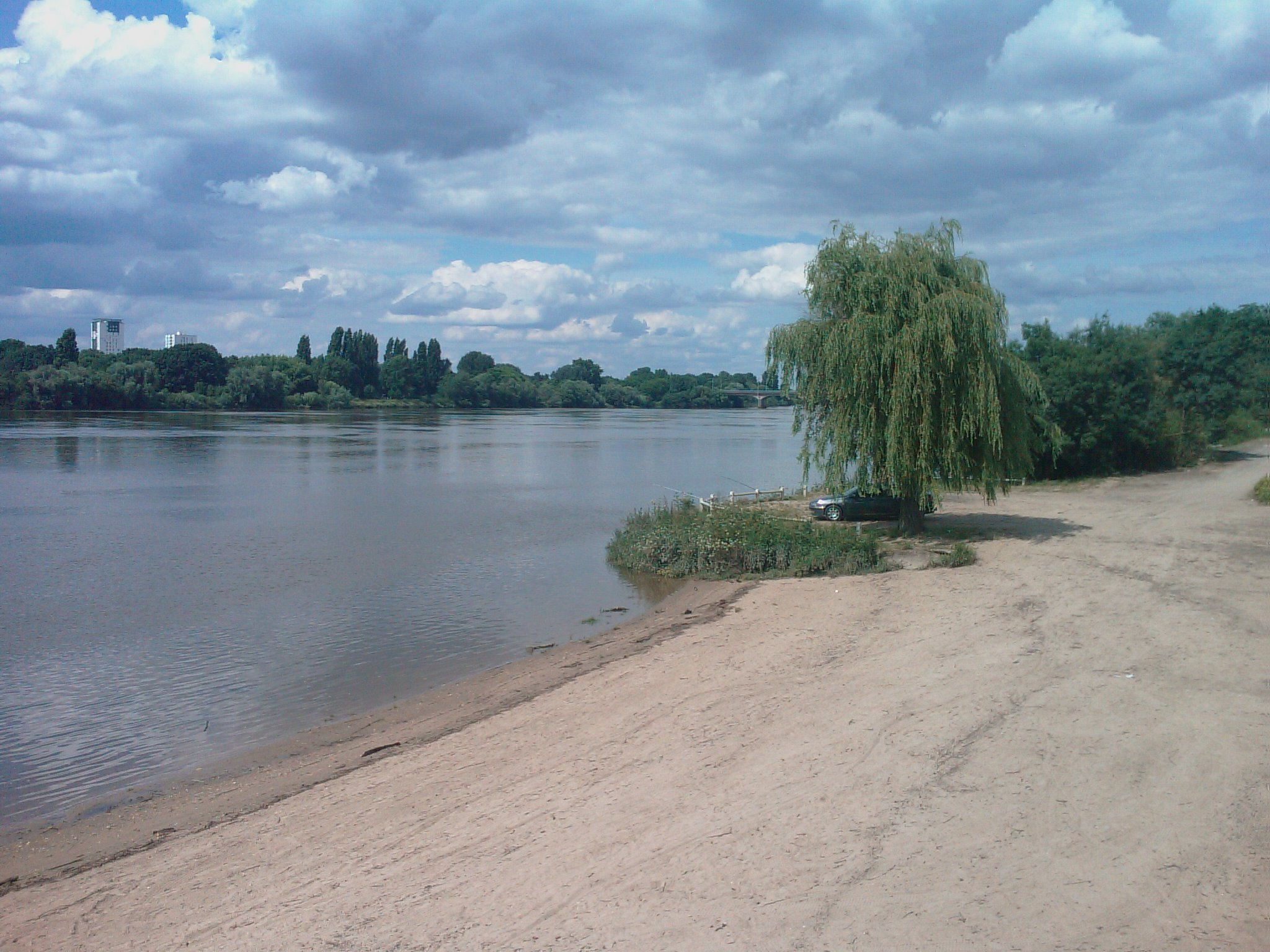
- Loire River

- Coat of arms
- Location of Saint-Sébastien-sur-Loire
- Location within France Location within Pays de la Loire
- Coordinates: 47°12′29″N 1°30′05″W
- Country: France
- Region: Pays de la Loire
- Department: Loire-Atlantique
- Arrondissement: Nantes
- Canton: Saint-Sébastien-sur-Loire
- Intercommunality: Nantes Métropole

Government
  - Mayor (2020–2026): Laurent Turquois
- Area^{1}: 11.66 km^{2} (4.50 sq mi)
- Highest elevation: 33 m (108 ft)
- Lowest elevation: 2 m (6.6 ft)
- Population (2023): 28,596
  - Density: 2,452/km^{2} (6,352/sq mi)
- Time zone: UTC+01:00 (CET)
  - Summer (DST): UTC+02:00 (CEST)
- INSEE/Postal code: 44190 /44230
- ^{1} French Land Register data, which excludes lakes, ponds, glaciers > 1 km^{2} (0.386 sq mi or 247 acres) and river estuaries.

Saint-Sébastien-sur-Loire (French pronunciation: [sɛ̃ sebastjɛ̃ syʁ lwaʁ], lit. 'Saint-Sébastien on Loire'; Breton: Sant-Sebastian-an-Enk) is a commune in the Loire-Atlantique department in western France.

It is the third-largest suburb of the city of Nantes, and is adjacent to it on the southeast, across the river Loire. It has two railway stations on the line to Clisson: Saint-Sébastien-Pas-Enchantés and Saint-Sébastien-Frêne-Rond.

== History ==
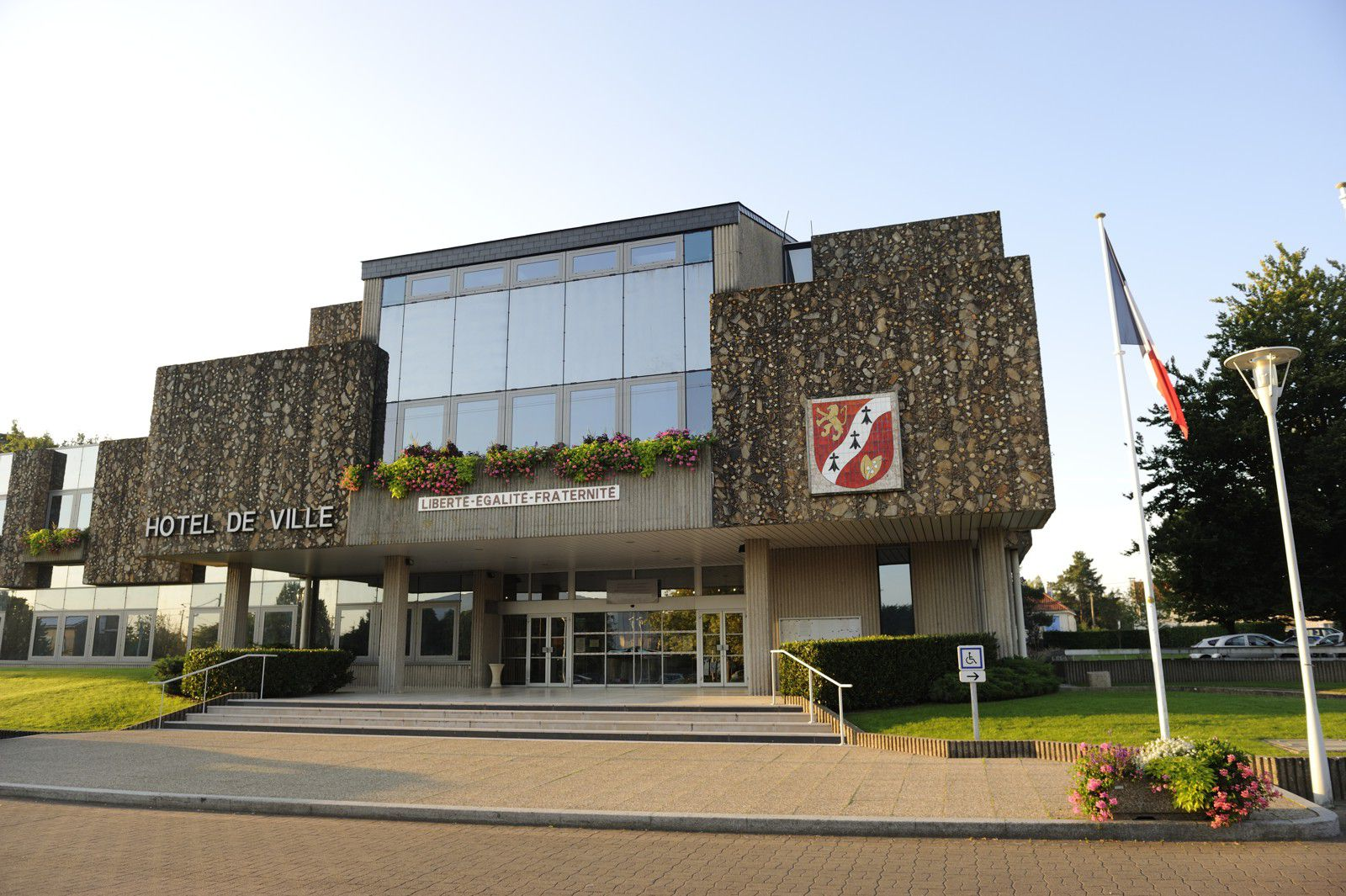
The Hôtel de Ville

The territory of the commune was occupied at the earliest 3,000 years before our era.

During the Revolution, despite its proximity to Nantes, the commune sided massively against the Republic and joined the Vendée insurrection of March 1793.

The Hôtel de Ville was completed in 1982.

== Population ==
Historical population

Year	Pop.	±% p.a.
1793	2,507	—
1800	1,353	−8.43%
1806	1,377	+0.29%
1821	1,573	+0.89%
1831	1,605	+0.20%
1841	1,886	+1.63%
1846	1,985	+1.03%
1851	2,016	+0.31%
1856	1,976	−0.40%
1861	2,066	+0.89%
1866	2,349	+2.60%
1872	2,260	−0.64%
1876	2,340	+0.87%
1881	2,315	−0.21%
1886	2,419	+0.88%
1891	2,440	+0.17%
1896	2,497	+0.46%
1901	2,498	+0.01%

Year	Pop.	±% p.a.
1906	2,610	+0.88%
1911	2,740	+0.98%
1921	3,096	+1.23%
1926	3,584	+2.97%
1931	4,534	+4.81%
1936	5,113	+2.43%
1946	6,637	+2.64%
1954	8,427	+3.03%
1962	11,830	+4.33%
1968	14,159	+3.04%
1975	17,326	+2.93%
1982	17,825	+0.41%
1990	22,202	+2.78%
1999	25,223	+1.43%
2007	24,724	−0.25%
2012	25,655	+0.74%
2017	26,838	+0.91%
2023	28,596	+1.06%

Source: EHESS and INSEE (1968-2023)

== Twin towns - sister cities ==
Saint-Sébastien-sur-Loire is twinned with:

- Cernavodă, Romania
- Glinde, Germany
- Kaposvár, Hungary
- Kati, Mali
- Porthcawl, Wales

== Personalities ==
- Rahim Redcar(born 1 June 1988) (age 31), previously known as Christine and the Queens, French singer, songwriter and producer
- Clara Hervouet
- Giovanni Sio (born 31 March 1989), footballer
- Nates Geovannie, rugby player

== See also ==
- Communes of the Loire-Atlantique department
