= Surfonds =

- Commune
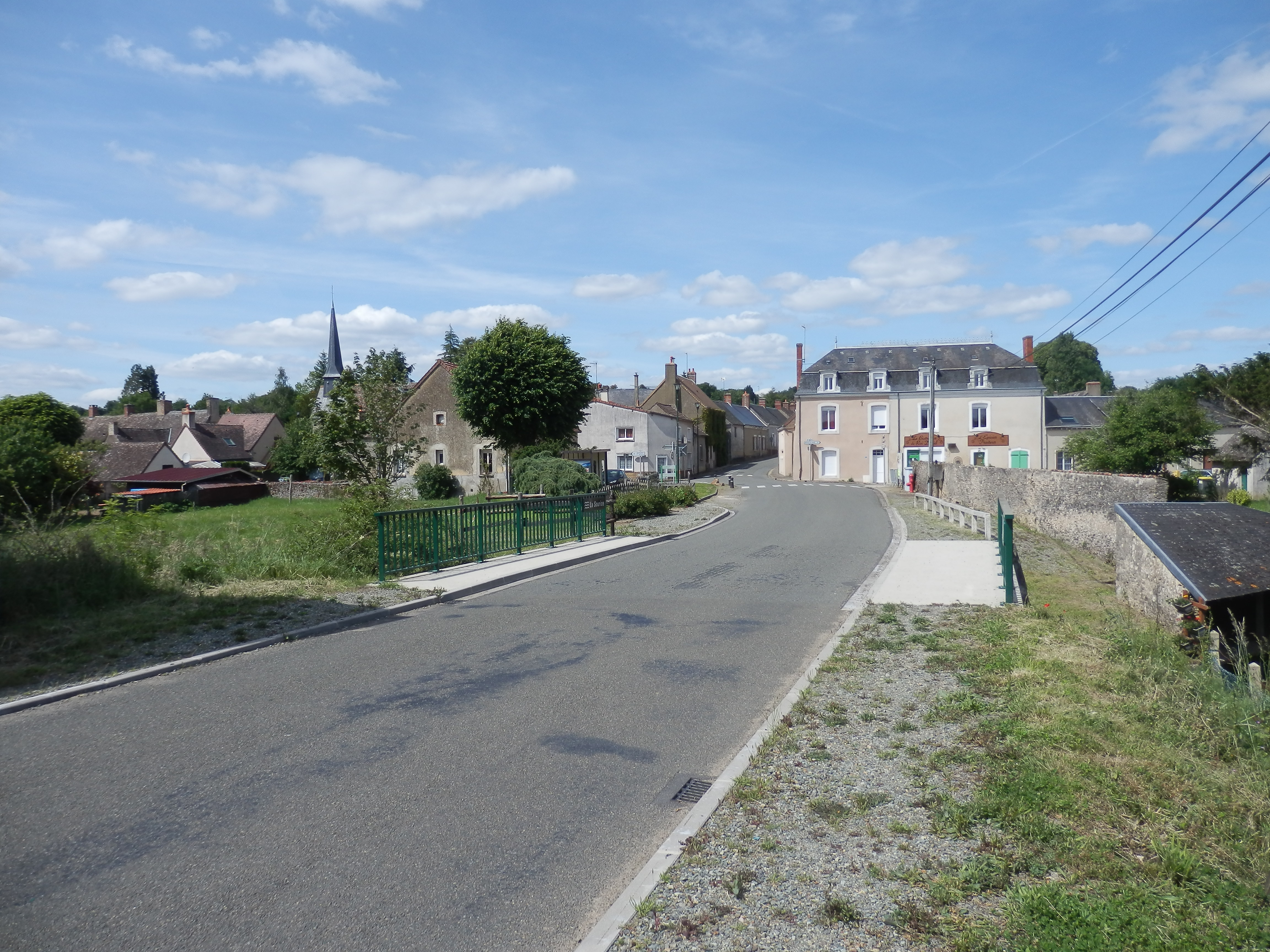
- A view across the road bridge over the Sourice
- Location of Surfonds
- Location within France Location within Pays de la Loire
- Coordinates: 47°58′30″N 0°27′44″E
- Country: France
- Region: Pays de la Loire
- Department: Sarthe
- Arrondissement: Mamers
- Canton: Savigné-l'Évêque
- Intercommunality: Le Gesnois Bilurien

Government
  - Mayor (2020–2026): Alain Dutertre
- Area^{1}: 4.85 km^{2} (1.87 sq mi)
- Highest elevation: 144 m (472 ft)
- Lowest elevation: 79 m (259 ft)
- Population (2023): 339
  - Density: 69.9/km^{2} (181/sq mi)
- Demonym(s): Surfondais, Surfondaise
- Time zone: UTC+01:00 (CET)
  - Summer (DST): UTC+02:00 (CEST)
- INSEE/Postal code: 72345 /72370
- ^{1} French Land Register data, which excludes lakes, ponds, glaciers > 1 km^{2} (0.386 sq mi or 247 acres) and river estuaries.

Surfonds (French pronunciation: [syʁfɔ̃]) is a commune in the Sarthe department in the region of Pays de la Loire in north-western France.

== See also ==
- Communes of the Sarthe department
