= Boissy-le-Repos =

- Commune
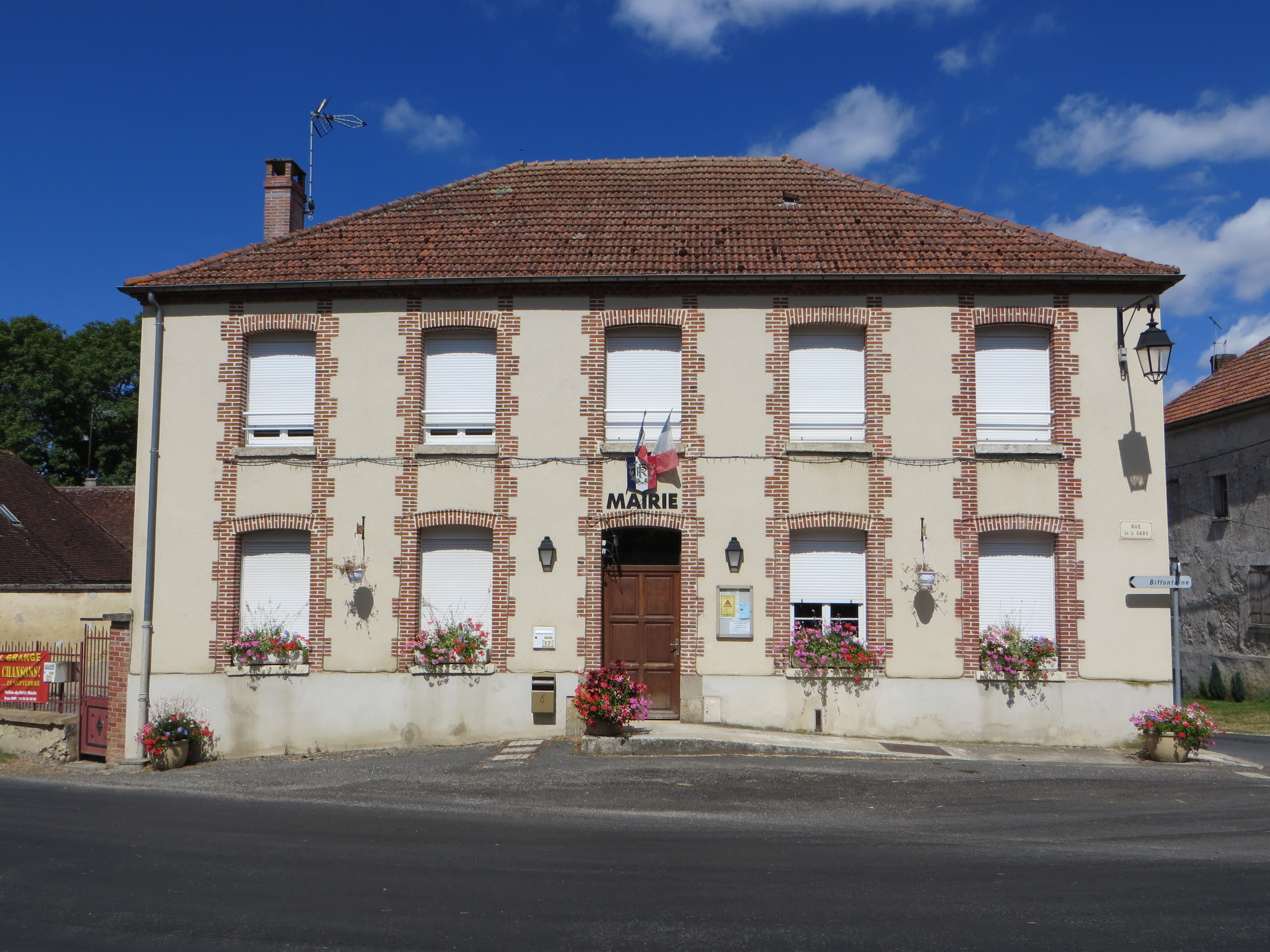
- The town hall in Boissy-le-Repos

- Coat of arms
- Location of Boissy-le-Repos
- Location within France Location within Grand Est
- Coordinates: 48°50′53″N 3°38′56″E
- Country: France
- Region: Grand Est
- Department: Marne
- Arrondissement: Épernay
- Canton: Sézanne-Brie et Champagne
- Intercommunality: Brie Champenoise

Government
  - Mayor (2020–2026): Bernard Wauquiez
- Area^{1}: 15.3 km^{2} (5.9 sq mi)
- Elevation: 160 m (520 ft)
- Population (2023): 234
  - Density: 15.3/km^{2} (39.6/sq mi)
- Time zone: UTC+01:00 (CET)
  - Summer (DST): UTC+02:00 (CEST)
- INSEE/Postal code: 51070 /51210
- ^{1} French Land Register data, which excludes lakes, ponds, glaciers > 1 km^{2} (0.386 sq mi or 247 acres) and river estuaries.

Boissy-le-Repos (French pronunciation: [bwasi lə ʁəpo]) is a commune of the Marne department in northeastern France.

== Population ==
Historical population
Year	Pop.	±% p.a.
1968	121	—
1975	123	+0.23%
1982	129	+0.68%
1990	154	+2.24%
1999	180	+1.75%
2007	210	+1.95%
2012	201	−0.87%
2017	220	+1.82%
2023	234	+1.03%
Source: INSEE

== See also ==
- Communes of the Marne department
