= Saint-Mars-la-Brière =

- Commune
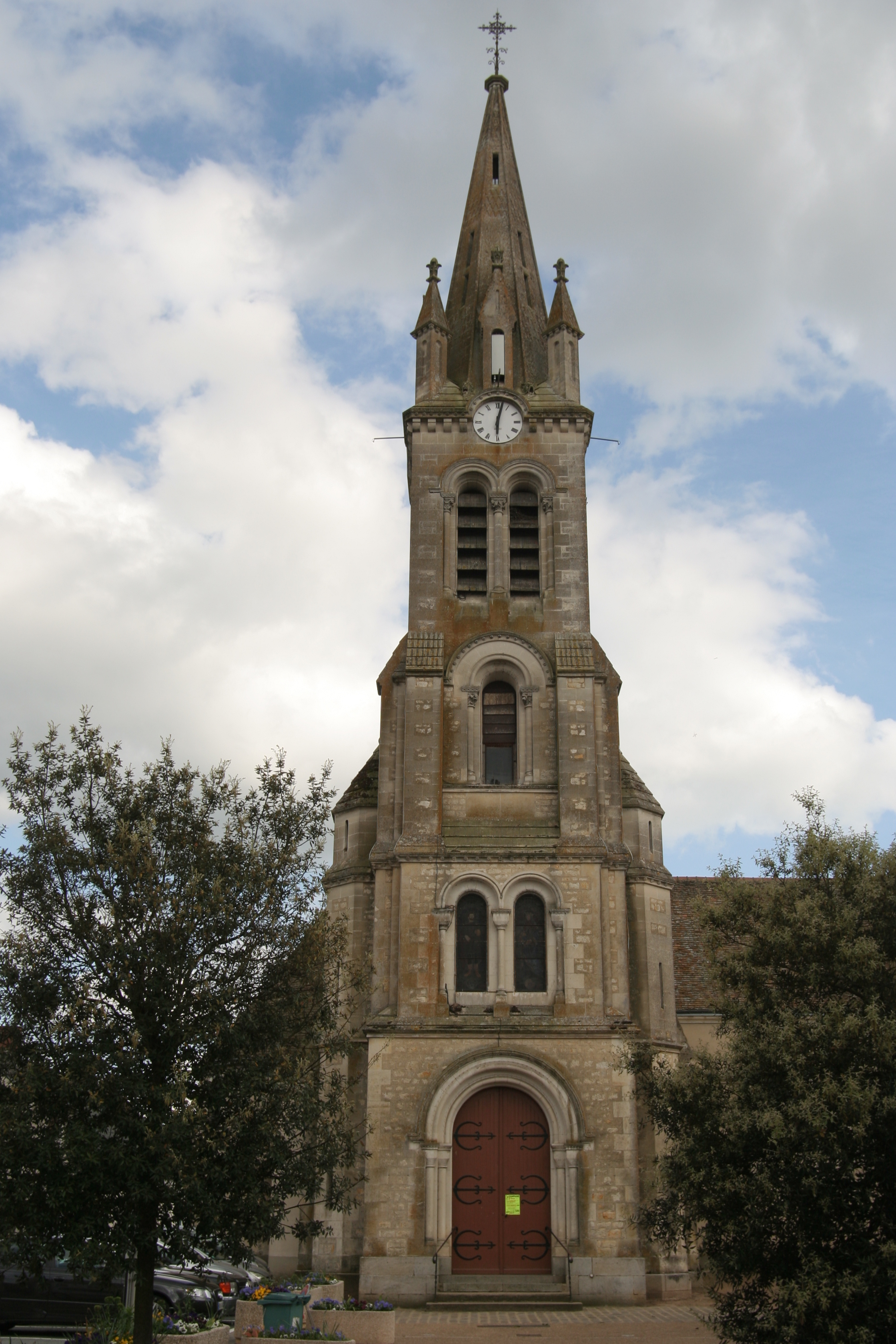
- The church of Saint-Médard, in Saint-Mars-la-Brière

- Coat of arms
- Location of Saint-Mars-la-Brière
- Location within France Location within Pays de la Loire
- Coordinates: 48°01′46″N 0°22′18″E
- Country: France
- Region: Pays de la Loire
- Department: Sarthe
- Arrondissement: Mamers
- Canton: Savigné-l'Évêque
- Intercommunality: Le Gesnois Bilurien

Government
  - Mayor (2020–2026): Patrice Vernhettes
- Area^{1}: 34.69 km^{2} (13.39 sq mi)
- Population (2023): 2,681
  - Density: 77.28/km^{2} (200.2/sq mi)
- Demonym(s): Brierois, Brieroise
- Time zone: UTC+01:00 (CET)
  - Summer (DST): UTC+02:00 (CEST)
- INSEE/Postal code: 72300 /72470
- ^{1} French Land Register data, which excludes lakes, ponds, glaciers > 1 km^{2} (0.386 sq mi or 247 acres) and river estuaries.

Saint-Mars-la-Brière (French pronunciation: [sɛ̃ maʁ la bʁijɛʁ]) is a commune in the Sarthe department in the region of Pays de la Loire in north-western France.

== Population ==
Historical population
Year	Pop.	±% p.a.
1968	1,743	—
1975	1,915	+1.35%
1982	2,157	+1.71%
1990	2,271	+0.65%
1999	2,360	+0.43%
2007	2,400	+0.21%
2012	2,510	+0.90%
2017	2,688	+1.38%
2023	2,681	−0.04%
Source: INSEE

== See also ==
- Communes of the Sarthe department
