= 1965 in association football =

The following are the football (soccer) events of the year 1965 throughout the world.

== Events ==
- Copa Libertadores 1965: Won by Independiente after defeating Peñarol on an aggregate score of 4–1.
- February 6:Retirement of Sir Stanley Matthews from professional football, five days after his fiftieth birthday.
- Substitutions allowed: The Football League voted 39 to 10 in favour of allowing clubs to introduce a substitute for an injured player at any time during a league match.
- FC Twente (Enschede, the Netherlands) was founded
- FC Hansa Rostock was founded
- 1. FC Magdeburg was founded
- 1965 International Soccer League
  - League: Polonia Bytom defeated New York Americans, 5–1 on aggregate.
  - Cup: Polonia Bytom defeated Dukla Prague 3–1, on aggregate.

== Winners club national championship ==
=== Africa ===
- Egypt: Zamalek

=== Asia ===
- Japan: Toyo Industries
- Qatar: Al-Maref

=== Europe ===
- England: Manchester United
- France: Nantes
- Iceland: KR
- Italy: Internazionale Milano F.C.
- Netherlands: Feyenoord Rotterdam
- Scotland: Kilmarnock
- Spain: Real Madrid
- Turkey: Fenerbahçe
- West Germany: Werder Bremen

=== North America ===
- Mexico: Chivas Guadalajara

=== South America ===
- Argentina: Boca Juniors
- Brazil: Santos
- Chile: Universidad de Chile
- Paraguay: Olimpia Asunción

== International tournaments ==
- African Cup of Nations in Tunisia (November 12 – 21 1965)
  1. Ghana
  2. Tunisia
  3. Ivory Coast
- 1965 British Home Championship (October 3, 1964 – April 10, 1965)

England

== Births ==
- January 1 – Khabib Ilyaletdinov, Russian club player
- January 6 – David Byrom, English professional footballer
- January 9 – Iain Dowie, English-Northern Irish footballer, manager and pundit
- January 13 – Bennett Masinga, South African international footballer (died 2013)
- January 25 – Josef Ringel, retired Czech footballer
- February 4 – John van Loen, Dutch footballer and assistant-coach
- February 5 – Gheorghe Hagi, Romanian footballer, manager and club owner
- February 15 – Gustavo Quinteros, Bolivian footballer and manager
- February 25 – Grafton Holband, Dutch former professional footballer
- March 3 – Dragan Stojković, Serbian international and coach
- March 8 – Juan Hernández Ramírez, Mexican international footballer
- May 4 – Aykut Kocaman, Turkish international
- May 17 – Massimo Crippa, Italian international footballer
- May 23 – Manuel Sanchís Hontiyuelo, Spanish international footballer
- June 7 – Jean-Pierre François, French footballer and singer
- June 12 – Carlos Luis Morales, Ecuadorian goalkeeper
- June 30 – Dietmar Drabek, Austrian referee
- July 5 – Abdoulaye Sogue, Senegalese former professional footballer
- July 17 – Muhamad Radhi Mat Din, Malaysian coach and footballer
- July 18 – Rosanan Samak, Bruneian football coach
- July 27 – José Luis Chilavert, Paraguayan goalkeeper
- July 27 – Trifon Ivanov, Bulgarian international footballer (died 2016)
- July 30 – Leonel Álvarez, Colombian footballer
- August 9 – David Kealy, Irish footballer
- August 21 – Juan Lombardi, former Uruguayan footballer
- August 27 – Ange Postecoglou, Greek-born Australian football player and manager
- August 30 – Peter Grant, Scottish football player and manager
- August 31 – Ricardo Gónzalez, Chilean footballer
- September 7
  - Enrico Bizzotto, retired Swiss footballer
  - Darko Pančev, Macedonian footballer
- September 22 – Christophe Jeannet, French footballer
- September 24 – Roberto Siboldi, Uruguayan footballer
- October 6 – Jürgen Kohler, German international footballer and manager
- November 16 – Mika Aaltonen, Finnish international footballer
- November 17 – Terence Mophuting, Botswanan footballer
- November 24 – Tom Boyd, Scottish footballer
- November 25 – Mauro Blanco, Bolivian footballer
- December 10 – José Aurelio Gay, Spanish football player and manager

== Deaths ==
=== January ===
- January 21 - Arie Bieshaar (65), Dutch footballer (born 1899)

=== August ===
- August 24 – Amílcar Barbuy, Brazilian midfielder, known as one of the most influential players of Sport Club Corinthians Paulista. (72)
- August 30 – Píndaro de Carvalho Rodrigues, Brazilian midfielder and manager of the Brazil National Football Team at the 1930 FIFA World Cup, winner of the 1919 South American Championship. (73)

=== October ===
- October 11 – Roberto Cherro, Argentine forward, scored 213 goals for Boca Juniors, runner up of the 1930 FIFA World Cup . (58)
