= Abdoulaye =

Abdoulaye is a West African masculine given name and surname. It is equivalent to the Arabic names Abdallah or Abdullah (Arabic: عبد الله ʿAbdu-llahi; servant of God), given name of Muhammad's father. People with this name include:

== Given name ==
=== Footballers ===
- Abdoulaye Keita (Guinean footballer), Guinean goalkeeper of the 1970s and 1980s
- Abdoulaye Sarr (born 1951), Senegalese coach
- Abdoulaye Kaloga (born 1959), Malian midfielder
- Abdoulaye Sogue (born 1965), Senegalese striker
- Abdoulaye Traoré (Ivorian footballer) (born 1967), striker
- Abdoulaye Traoré (Burkinabé footballer) (born 1974), midfielder
- Abdoulaye Coulibaly (footballer born 1976), Ivorian defender
- Abdoulaye Demba (born 1976), Malian forward
- Abdoulaye Faye (born 1978), Senegalese defender
- Abdoulaye Khouma Keita (born 1978), Senegalese defender
- Abdoulaye Soulama (born 1979), Burkinabé goalkeeper
- Abdoulaye Camara (born 1980), Malian defender
- Abdoulaye Méïté (born 1980), Ivorian centre-back
- Abdoulaye Soumaré (born 1980), Burundian striker
- Abdoulaye Djire (born 1981), Ivorian midfielder
- Abdoulaye Diawara (footballer, born 1981) (born 1981), Ivorian defender
- Abdoulaye Kapi Sylla (born 1982), Guinean midfielder
- Abdoulaye Cissé (born 1983), Côte d'Ivoire-born Burkinabé striker
- Abdoulaye Diawara (footballer born 1983), Malian midfielder
- Abdoulaye Djibril Diallo (born 1983), Guinean midfielder
- Abdoulaye Niang (born 1983), Senegalese midfielder
- Abdoulaye Sekou Sampil (born 1984), Senegal-born French striker
- Abdoulaye Ouzérou (born 1985), Beninese striker
- Abdoulaye Soumah (born 1985), Guinean goalkeeper
- Abdoulaye Baldé (footballer) (born 1986), French striker of Guinean descent
- Abdoulaye Diarra (footballer, born 1986), Ivorian midfielder
- Abdoulaye Samaké (born 1987), Malian goalkeeper
- Abdoulaye Coulibaly (footballer born 1988), Senegalese goalkeeper
- Abdoulaye Maïga (born 1988), Malian defender
- Abdoulaye Seck (footballer, born 1988), Senegalese footballer
- Abdoulaye Seck (footballer, born 1992), Senegalese footballer
- Abdoulaye Fall (born 1989), Senegalese defensive midfielder
- Abdoulaye Bamba (born 1990), Ivorian right back
- Abdoulaye Keita (footballer, born 1990), French goalkeeper
- Abdoulaye Ba (born 1991), Senegalese defender
- Abdoulaye Sileye Gaye (born 1991), Mauritanian midfielder
- Abdoulaye Koffi (born 1991), Ivorian forward
- Abdoulaye Diallo (born 1992), Senegalese goalkeeper
- Abdoulaye Sané (born 1992), Senegalese striker
- Abdoulaye Sissoko (born 1992), Malian midfielder
- Abdoulaye Doucouré (born 1993), French midfielder of Malian descent
- Abdoulaye Cissé (Guinean footballer) (born 1994), defender
- Abdoulaye Diarra (footballer, born 1994), Malian midfielder
- Abdoulaye Keita (footballer, born 1994), Malian defensive midfielder
- Abdoulaye Touré (footballer) (born 1994), French midfielder of Guinean descent

=== Other sportspeople ===
- Abdoulaye Seye (1934–2011), Senegalese sprinter
- Abdoulaye Thiam (born 1984), Senegalese fencer
- Abdoulaye Wagne (born 1981), Senegalese middle-distance runner
- Abdoulaye M'Baye (basketball) (born 1988), French basketball player
- Abdoulaye Loum (born 1991), French basketball player

=== Artists, musicians, and writers ===
- Abdoulaye Sadji (1910–1961), Senegalese writer and teacher
- Abdoulaye Mamani (1932–1993), Nigerien poet, novelist and trade unionist
- Abdoulaye Ascofaré (born 1949), Malian filmmaker
- Abdoulaye Diakité (1951–2018), Senegalese djembe drummer
- Abdoulaye Diabaté (singer) (born 1956), Senegalese singer and guitarist
- Oxmo Puccino (born Abdoulaye Diarra, 1974), Malian hip hop musician

=== Politicians ===
- Abdoulaye Touré (c. 1920–1985), Guinean politician
- Abdoulaye Wade (born 1926), Senegalese politician, former president
- Abdoulaye Sékou Sow (1931–2013), Malian politician, former prime minister
- Abdoulaye Yerodia Ndombasi (1933–2019), Congolese politician, former foreign minister and vice-president
- Abdoulaye Hamani Diori (1945–2011), Nigerien politician and businessman
- Abdoulaye Bathily (born 1947), Senegalese politician and diplomat
- Abdoulaye Baldé (politician) (born 1964), Senegalese politician
- Abdoulaye Diop (diplomat) (born 1968), Malian diplomat
- Abdoulaye Maïga, ambassador of Mali to the United States in 1960.
- Abdoulaye Idrissa Maïga (born 11 March 1958), prime minister of Mali from 8 April 2017 to 29 December 2017.
- Abdoulaye Maïga (officer) (born 1981), appointed interim prime minister of Mali in August 2022.
- Abdoulaye Mar Dieye, Senegalese United Nations official
- Abdoulaye Diouf Sarr, Senegalese government minister

=== Military ===
- Abdoulaye Hissène, Central African warlord
- Abdoulaye Miskine, Central African rebel leader

== Surname ==
- Adjaratou Abdoulaye, Togolese politician
- Brahim Abdoulaye (born 1970), Chadian sprinter
- Bruce Abdoulaye (born 1982), Congolese football right back
- Djidéo Abdoulaye (born 1988), Chadian football player
- Hassan Abdoulaye, Chadian football player
- Maikano Abdoulaye (1932–2011), Cameroonian politician
- Souley Abdoulaye (born 1965), Nigerien politician
