= 2011–12 AS Saint-Étienne season =

AS Saint-Étienne
2011–12 season
- President: Bernard Caïazzo; Roland Romeyer
- Head coach: Christophe Galtier
- Stadium: Stade Geoffroy-Guichard
- Ligue 1: 7th
- Coupe de France: Round of 64
- Coupe de la Ligue: Round of 16
- Top goalscorer: League: Pierre-Emerick Aubameyang (16); All: Pierre-Emerick Aubameyang (18)
- Average home league attendance: 21,533
Home colours	Away colours

The 2011–12 season was the 78th season in the existence of AS Saint-Étienne and the club's eighth consecutive season in the top flight of French football.

== Players ==
Note: Flags indicate national team as defined under FIFA eligibility rules; some limited exceptions apply. Players may hold more than one non-FIFA nationality.

No.	Pos.	Nation	Player
1	GK	FRA	Stéphane Ruffier
4	DF	FRA	Kurt Zouma
5	DF	FRA	Sylvain Marchal
6	DF	FRA	Sylvain Monsoreau
7	FW	GAB	Pierre-Emerick Aubameyang
8	MF	ARG	Alejandro Alonso
9	FW	CIV	Max Gradel
10	MF	FRA	Laurent Batlles
11	MF	FRA	Jérémy Clément
12	DF	FRA	Jean-Pascal Mignot
13	DF	FRA	Faouzi Ghoulam
14	FW	FRA	Florent Sinama Pongolle (on loan from Sporting CP)
15	DF	FRA	Yoann Andreu
16	GK	FRA	Jérémie Janot

No.	Pos.	Nation	Player
18	DF	FRA	Fabien Lemoine
19	MF	FRA	Josuha Guilavogui
20	MF	FRA	Jonathan Brison
21	MF	FRA	Yoric Ravet
22	FW	SRB	Danijel Aleksić
23	DF	FRA	Albin Ebondo
24	MF	FRA	Loïc Perrin (captain)
25	MF	ROU	Bănel Nicoliță
26	MF	FRA	Bakary Sako
27	DF	FRA	Loris Néry
28	FW	CIV	Boubacar Sanogo
29	FW	FRA	Lynel Kitambala
30	GK	SEN	Abdoulaye Coulibaly

== Pre-season and friendlies ==
8 July 2011 Friendly	Saint-Étienne	0–1	Istres
18:30 CEST (UTC+2)				Attendance: 1,000

15 July 2011 Friendly	Saint-Étienne	3–0	Châteauroux	Roanne
19:00 CEST (UTC+2)				Stadium: Stade Henri Malleval; Attendance: 1,500

19 July 2011 Friendly	Saint-Étienne	3–1	Arles-Avignon	Valence
19:00 CEST (UTC+2)				Stadium: Stade Georges Pompidou

23 July 2011 Friendly	Saint-Étienne	1–0	Lille	Valence
18:30 CEST (UTC+2)	Aubameyang 20'			Stadium: Stade Georges Pompidou; Attendance: 3,000

27 July 2011 Friendly	Saint-Étienne	1–1	Rio Ave
19:30 CEST (UTC+2)

30 July 2011 Friendly	Saint-Étienne	3–0	Evian	Chambéry
19:10 CEST (UTC+2)				Stadium: Stade Municipal de Chambéry; Attendance: 3,500

6 October 2011 Friendly	Servette	1–1	Saint-Étienne
19:00 CEST (UTC+2)

10 November 2011 Friendly	Saint-Étienne	2–1	Clermont	Feurs
19:00 CEST (UTC+2)				Stadium: Stade Maurice Rousson

4 January 2012 Friendly	AS Béziers	0–3	Saint-Étienne
19:00 CEST (UTC+2)				Attendance: 300

18 January 2012 Friendly	US Feurs	0–2	Saint-Étienne	Feurs
19:00 CEST (UTC+2)			Kitambala 44'; Ravet 63'	Stadium: Stade Maurice Rousson

== Competitions ==
=== Overview ===
Competition	First match	Last match	Starting round	Final position	Record							
Competition	First match	Last match	Starting round	Final position	Pld	W	D	L	GF	GA	GD	Win %
Ligue 1	7 August 2011	20 May 2012	Matchday 1	7th	38	16	9	13	49	45	+4	42.11
Coupe de France	7 January 2012		Round of 64	Round of 64	1	0	1	0	1	1	+0	0.00
Coupe de la Ligue	31 August 2011	26 October 2011	Third round	Round of 16	2	1	0	1	2	3	−1	50.00
Total					41	17	10	14	52	49	+3	41.46

Source: Competitions

=== Ligue 1 ===
==== League table ====
Pos	Team	Pld	W	D	L	GF	GA	GD	Pts	Qualification or relegation
5	Bordeaux	38	16	13	9	53	41	+12	61	Qualification to Europa League play-off round (Note: Lyon won the 2011–12 Coupe de France and thus qualified for the group stage of the 2012–13 UEFA Europa League. Since they finished 4th, the spot for the Europa League play-off round goes to the fifth-placed team.)
6	Rennes	38	17	9	12	53	44	+9	60	
7	Saint-Étienne	38	16	9	13	49	45	+4	57	
8	Toulouse	38	15	11	12	37	34	+3	56	
9	Evian	38	13	11	14	54	55	−1	50	

Source: Ligue 1
Rules for classification: 1) points; 2) goal difference; 3) number of goals scored.

==== Results summary ====
Overall								Home						Away					
Pld	W	D	L	GF	GA	GD	Pts	W	D	L	GF	GA	GD	W	D	L	GF	GA	GD
38	16	9	13	49	45	+4	57	9	4	6	27	20	+7	7	5	7	22	25	−3

Source: Ligue 1

==== Results by round ====
Round	1	2	3	4	5	6	7	8	9	10	11	12	13	14	15	16	17	18	19	20	21	22	23	24	25	26	27	28	29	30	31	32	33	34	35	36	37	38
Ground	A	H	A	A	H	A	H	A	H	A	H	A	H	A	H	A	H	A	H	A	H	H	A	H	A	H	A	H	A	H	A	H	A	H	A	H	A	H
Result	W	W	D	L	L	L	D	D	D	W	W	L	D	W	W	D	W	W	L	W	L	W	W	W	D	L	D	L	L	L	D	W	W	W	L	D	L	L
Position	4	4	3	8	9	12	12	11	12	13	8	8	10	8	8	8	7	5	8	7	8	7	6	4	4	5	4	6	6	6	7	7	6	6	6	6	6	7

Source: Ligue 1
A = Away; H = Home; W = Win; D = Draw; L = Loss

==== Matches ====
7 August 2011 1	Bordeaux	1–2	Saint-Étienne	Bordeaux
21:00 CEST (UTC+2)				Stadium: Stade Chaban-Delmas

13 August 2011 2	Saint-Étienne	1–0	Nancy	Saint-Étienne
19:00 CEST (UTC+2)				Stadium: Stade Geoffroy-Guichard

21 August 2011 3	Marseille	0–0	Saint-Étienne	Marseille
21:00 CEST (UTC+2)				Stadium: Stade Vélodrome

28 August 2011 4	Sochaux	2–1	Saint-Étienne	Montbéliard
17:00 CEST (UTC+2)				Stadium: Stade Auguste Bonal

10 September 2011 5	Saint-Étienne	1–3	Lille	Saint-Étienne
19:00 CEST (UTC+2)				Stadium: Stade Geoffroy-Guichard

17 September 2011 6	Lorient	3–0	Saint-Étienne	Lorient
19:00 CEST (UTC+2)				Stadium: Stade Yves Allainmat

21 September 2011 7	Saint-Étienne	1–1	Toulouse	Saint-Étienne
21:00 CEST (UTC+2)				Stadium: Stade Geoffroy-Guichard

25 September 2011 8	Rennes	1–1	Saint-Étienne	Rennes
21:00 CEST (UTC+2)				Stadium: Stade de la Route de Lorient

1 October 2011 9	Saint-Étienne	1–1	Auxerre	Saint-Étienne
19:00 CEST (UTC+2)				Stadium: Stade Geoffroy-Guichard

15 October 2011 10	Evian	1–2	Saint-Étienne	Annecy
19:00 CEST (UTC+2)				Stadium: Parc des Sports

22 October 2011 11	Saint-Étienne	1–0	Valenciennes	Saint-Étienne
19:00 CEST (UTC+2)				Stadium: Stade Geoffroy-Guichard

29 October 2011 12	Lyon	2–0	Saint-Étienne	Lyon
21:00 CEST (UTC+2)	Briand 82'; Gourcuff 90+1'			Stadium: Stade de Gerland; Attendance: 38,982; Referee: Tony Chapron

6 November 2011 13	Saint-Étienne	1–1	Montpellier	Saint-Étienne
17:00 CET (UTC+1)				Stadium: Stade Geoffroy-Guichard

19 November 2011 14	Nice	0–2	Saint-Étienne	Nice
19:00 CET (UTC+1)				Stadium: Stade du Ray; Attendance: 8,599

26 November 2011 15	Saint-Étienne	3–1	Ajaccio	Saint-Étienne
19:00 CET (UTC+1)				Stadium: Stade Geoffroy-Guichard; Attendance: 20,059; Referee: Philippe Kalt

3 December 2011 16	Brest	2–2	Saint-Étienne	Brest
19:00 CET (UTC+1)				Stadium: Stade Francis Le Blé

10 December 2011 17	Saint-Étienne	2–0	Caen	Saint-Étienne
19:00 CET (UTC+1)				Stadium: Stade Geoffroy-Guichard

17 December 2011 18	Dijon	1–2	Saint-Étienne	Dijon
19:00 CET (UTC+1)				Stadium: Stade Gaston Gérard

21 December 2011 19	Saint-Étienne	0–1	Paris Saint-Germain	Saint-Étienne
21:00 CET (UTC+1)			Ruffier 32' (o.g.)	Stadium: Stade Geoffroy-Guichard; Attendance: 25,136; Referee: Saïd Ennjimi

14 January 2012 20	Saint-Étienne	1–0	Sochaux	Saint-Étienne
21:00 CET (UTC+1)	Zouma 77'			Stadium: Stade Geoffroy-Guichard; Attendance: 20,222; Referee: Clément Turpin

28 January 2012 21	Lille	3–0	Saint-Étienne	Villeneuve d'Ascq
21:00 CET (UTC+1)				Stadium: Stadium Lille Métropole

22 February 2012 22	Saint-Étienne	4–2	Lorient	Saint-Étienne
18:30 CET (UTC+1)				Stadium: Stade Geoffroy-Guichard; Attendance: 21,039; Referee: Benoît Bastien

31 March 2012 30	Saint-Étienne	2–3	Nice	Saint-Étienne
19:00 CEST (UTC+2)				Stadium: Stade Geoffroy-Guichard; Attendance: 22,035; Referee: Nicolas Rainville

7 April 2012 31	Ajaccio	1–1	Saint-Étienne	Ajaccio
19:00 CEST (UTC+2)				Stadium: Stade François Coty

15 April 2012 32	Saint-Étienne	2–1	Brest	Saint-Étienne
17:00 CEST (UTC+2)				Stadium: Stade Geoffroy-Guichard

21 April 2012 33	Caen	1–4	Saint-Étienne	Caen
19:00 CEST (UTC+2)				Stadium: Stade Michel d'Ornano

29 April 2012 34	Saint-Étienne	1–0	Dijon	Saint-Étienne
17:00 CEST (UTC+2)				Stadium: Stade Geoffroy-Guichard

2 May 2012 35	Paris Saint-Germain	2–0	Saint-Étienne	Paris
21:00 CEST (UTC+2)				Stadium: Parc des Princes

7 May 2012 36	Saint-Étienne	0–0	Marseille	Saint-Étienne
19:00 CEST (UTC+2)				Stadium: Stade Geoffroy-Guichard

13 May 2012 37	Nancy	3–2	Saint-Étienne	Tomblaine
21:00 CEST (UTC+2)				Stadium: Stade Marcel Picot

20 May 2012 38	Saint-Étienne	2–3	Bordeaux	Saint-Étienne
21:00 CEST (UTC+2)				Stadium: Stade Geoffroy-Guichard

=== Coupe de France ===
7 January 2012 Round of 64	Saint-Étienne	1–1 (a.e.t.) (2–4 p)	Bordeaux	Saint-Étienne
20:45 CET (UTC+1)	Guilavogui 90+5'		Jussiê 35'; Bellion (penalty missed) 90+1'	Stadium: Stade Geoffroy-Guichard; Attendance: 17,532; Referee: Lionel Jaffredo

=== Coupe de la Ligue ===
31 August 2011 Third round	Saint-Étienne	3–1	Bordeaux	Saint-Étienne
20:45 CEST (UTC+2)	Olimpa 3' (o.g.); Sako 17'; Aubameyang 57'		Trémoulinas 10'	Stadium: Stade Geoffroy-Guichard; Attendance: 14,647; Referee: Lionel Jaffredo

26 October 2011 Round of 16	Saint-Étienne	1–2	Lyon	Saint-Étienne
20:50 CEST (UTC+2)	Aubameyang 88'		Briand 40'; Bastos 72' (pen.)	Stadium: Stade Geoffroy-Guichard; Attendance: 25,906; Referee: Clément Turpin
