= Jeannet =

Jeannet is a French surname. Notable people with the surname include:

- Christophe Jeannet (born 1965), French footballer
- Fabrice Jeannet (born 1980), French fencer
- Frédéric-Yves Jeannet (born 1959), French-born Mexican writer
- Jérôme Jeannet (born 1977), French fencer
- Louis-François Jeannet (1768–1832), French general

== See also ==
- Saint-Jeannet (disambiguation)
