= Abdoulaye Coulibaly =

Abdoulaye Coulibaly may refer to:

- Abdoulaye Coulibaly (footballer, born 1988), Senegalese footballer for AS Saint-Étienne
- Abdoulaye Coulibaly (footballer, born 1976), Ivorian footballer for ES Uzès Pont du Gard
