= 2023–24 Coupe de France preliminary rounds, Auvergne-Rhône-Alpes =

French football competition

The 2023–24 Coupe de France preliminary rounds, Auvergne-Rhône-Alpes is the qualifying competition to decide which teams from the leagues of the Auvergne-Rhône-Alpes region of France take part in the main competition from the seventh round.

A total of twenty teams will qualify from the Auvergne-Rhône-Alpes section of the 2023–24 Coupe de France preliminary rounds.

In 2022–23, three teams from the regional qualifying rounds reached the round of 32. Chambéry SF and FC Chamalières lost heavily, to Lyon and Paris FC respectively. Le Puy Foot 43 Auvergne went out on penalties to Vierzon FC.

== Draws and fixtures ==
On 19 July 2023, the league announced 919 teams had entered the competition. The first round draw was made on 25 and 26 July 2023, with 353 ties drawn. The second round draw was made on 29 August 2023, with 251 ties drawn, involving the 17 district level teams exempted from the first round, and the teams from Régional 2 and Régional 3 divisions.

The third round draw was published on 6 September 2023, with 150 ties drawn, involving the teams from Régional 1 and Championnat National 3 for the first time. The fourth round draw, featuring the six teams from Championnat National 2 was published on 20 September 2023. The fifth round draw, featuring the two teams from Championnat National, was made on 3 October 2023. The sixth and final regional round was drawn on 18 October 2023.

=== First round ===
These matches were played on 25, 26 and 27 August 2023, with one replayed on 3 September 2023.

First Round Results: Auvergne-Rhône-Alpes
Tie no	Home team (Tier)	Score	Away team (Tier)
1.	Sainges FC (12)	1–2	US Crandelles (9)
2.	Saint-Georges SL (11)	1–2	FC Artense (10)
3.	US Loupiac Saint-Christophe (11)	1–1 (4–5 p)	CS Arpajonnais (9)
4.	FC Albepierre-Bredons (12)	0–5	AS Yolet (10)
5.	ÉS Roannaise (11)	1–2	Jordanne FC (10)
6.	AS Trizac (12)	0–6	FC des Quatre Vallées (10)
7.	US Cère et Landes (11)	0–1	FC Junhac-Montsalvy (9)
8.	US Besse (11)	1–4	AS Espinat (9)
9.	US de la Cère (11)	0–2	AS Pleaux-Rilhac-Barriac (10)
10.	La Chapelle/Saint-Poncy FC (11)	4–1	Espérance Vieille-Brioude (10)
11.	Entente Anglards-Salers (12)	0–1	AS Belbexoise (9)
12.	AS Chaudes-Aigues (11)	0–0 (4–2 p)	ES Vebret-Ydes (10)
13.	AS Naucelles (11)	0–3 (Note: Tie won by means of forfeit.)	Sud Cantal Foot (9)
14.	AS Neussargues (11)	0–1	CS Vézac (10)
15.	AS Saint-Just (12)	1–7	ES Pierrefortaise (10)
16.	Aspre FC Fontanges (11)	4–0	US Carlat-Cros (11)
17.	Ayrens Sport (12)	2–2 (0–2 p)	FC Minier (10)
18.	AS Vebret-Antignac (12)	0–8	AS Sansacoise (9)
19.	FC Moussages (10)	0–0 (5–3 p)	ES Saint-Mamet (9)
20.	ÉS Lempdaise (12)	1–9	AS Cheminots Langeac (10)
21.	FC Rosières-Beaulieu (11)	0–4	Seauve Sports (9)
22.	US Lantriac (11)	1–2	AS Pertuis (10)
23.	AS Saint-Pal-de-Chalencon (11)	1–4	AS Villettoise (10)
24.	US Montfaucon Montregard Raucoules (11)	4–1	Olympique Retournac Beauzac (9)
25.	CO Coubon (10)	2–2 (2–0 p)	AS Loudes (9)
26.	AS Mazeyrat-d'Allier (11)	1–2	Solignac-Cussac FC (9)
27.	Haut Lignon Football (10)	2–0	AG Sainte-Sigolène (10)
28.	FJEP Freycenets Saint-Jeures (10)	0–5	AS Laussonne (10)
29.	AS Chadron Saint-Martin (11)	0–1	FC Vézézoux (10)
30.	AS Jonzieux (12)	3–2	FC Dunières (9)
31.	US Arsac-en-Velay (10)	0–3	FC Aurec (9)
32.	AS Saugues (10)	1–2	US Vals Le Puy (9)
33.	AS Saint-Ferréol Gampille Firminy (11)	2–4	AS Grazac-Lapte (9)
34.	FC Venteuges (11)	1–5	US Landos (9)
35.	FC Arzon (10)	2–2 (2–4 p)	US Bains-Saint-Christophe (9)
36.	FC Clermont International (12)	9–2	AS Cunlhat (11)
37.	AS Cellule (10)	6–0 (Note: Tie reversed from original draw.)	FC Bouzel (13)
38.	US Beauregard-Vendon (12)	2–1	AS Saint-Ours (11)
39.	FC Saint-Julien-de-Coppel (10)	2–2 (4–2 p)	RC Charbonnières-Paugnat (9)
40.	Haute Combraille Foot (11)	0–1	ES Volcans Malauzat (11)
41.	Saint-Amant et Tallende SC (11)	1–5	Aulnat Sportif (10)
42.	FC Augerollois (12)	0–4	Durolle Foot (10)
43.	ES Couze Pavin (11)	1–3	AS Enval-Marsat (9)
44.	CS Puy-Guillaume (11)	0–7	Clermont Ouvoimoja (9)
45.	FC Paslières-Noalhat (11)	1–3	AS Châteaugay (12) (Note: AS Châteaugay replaced FC Sayat Argnat in the draw.)
46.	CS Saint-Anthème (12)	6–1	AS Joze (10)
47.	US Pertuis (12)	2–7	Entente Charblot (11)
48.	US Ménétrol (11)	2–1	ES Saint-Germinoise (10)
49.	US Val de Couze Chambon (11)	0–3	AS Romagnat (9)
50.	CO Veyre-Monton (10)	1–1 (7–8 p)	Ecureuils Franc Rosier (9)
51.	US Saint-Georges / Les Ancizes (10)	1–4	UJ Clermontoise (9)
52.	AS Roche-Blanche FC (10)	2–3	ALS Besse Egliseneuve (9)
53.	Entente Vallée de la Dordogne (10)	5–4	FC Aubierois (9)
54.	US Saint-Gervaisienne (10)	3–3 (4–2 p)	AS Royat (9)
55.	FC Bromont-Lamothe/Montfermy (10)	0–2	FC Vertaizon' (9)
56.	FF Chappes (10)	1–3	US Bassin Minier (9)
57.	FC Thiers Auvergne (10)	2–2 (3–2 p)	FC Sauxillanges Saint-Babel Brenat (9)
58.	FC Nord Limagne (10)	2–2 (2–4 p)	JS Saint-Priest-des-Champs (9)
59.	US Messeix Bourg-Lastic (10)	0–1	FC Blanzat (9)
60.	FC Nord Combraille (10)	2–2 (3–4 p)	AS Orcines (9)
61.	FC Plauzat-Champeix (10)	3–2	RS Luzillat-Charnat-Vinzelles (9)
62.	ÉS Arconsat (10)	2–2 (5–4 p)	FC Lezoux (9)
63.	US Chapdes-Beaufort (10)	0–2	FC Mezel (9)
64.	ES Sauret-Besserve (13)	0–10	FC Mirefleurs (10)
65.	FC Ébreuil (12)	0–2	CS Saint-Bonnet-près-Riom (9)
66.	US Busset (12)	3–0	RAS Beauregard l'Évêque (10)
67.	AS Mayotte FC Bellerive (11)	2–1	US Courpière (9)
68.	CS Chantelle (12)	3–3 (5–4 p)	AS Job (10) (Note: AS Job replaced Clermont Métropole FC in the draw.)
69.	AS Dompierroise (9)	1–1 (4–2 p)	SC Saint-Pourcain (9)
70.	US Ainay-le-Château (13)	0–12	US Bien-Assis (10)
71.	Médiéval Club Montluçonnais (12)	1–6	AS Tronget (10)
72.	US Malicorne (12)	0–8	FC Souvigny (9)
73.	CS Cosne d'Allier (10)	3–2	AS Nord Vignoble (9)
74.	SC Gannat (10)	0–3	CS Bessay (9)
75.	Jaligny Vaumas Foot (11)	1–5	AS Louchy (9)
76.	Montluçon FC (11)	2–1	US Marcillat-Pionsat (10)
77.	US Abrest (10)	3–1	US Maringues (9)
78.	AS Le Breuil (12)	3–8	AS Moissat (9)
79.	US Varennes-sur-Tèche (11)	2–2 (4–3 p)	CS Pont-de-Dore (9)
80.	ES Arfeuilles (12)	1–2	CS Vaux-Estivareilles (9)
81.	OC Monetay-sur-Allier (11)	0–1	Étoile Moulins Yzeure (9)
82.	AS Sanssat (12)	0–15	SC Avermes (9)
83.	US Coeur Allier (10)	7–0	AS Gennetinoise (10)
84.	Entente US Saulcet-Le Theil/AS Bransat (11)	2–2 (6–5 p)	FC Billy-Crechy (10)
85.	US Biachette Désertines (10)	3–1	US Vallon (9)
86.	AS Mercy-Chapeau (11)	1–6	FC Haut d'Allier (10)
87.	AS Lurcyquoise (11)	0–7	AL Quinssaines (9)
88.	US Saint-Désiré (11)	1–2	US Saint-Victor-Malescours (10)
89.	Magnet/Seuillet/Saint-Gérand-le-Puy Foot (12)	3–3 (3–5 p)	ES Montagne Bourbonnaise (10)
90.	ES Saint-Étienne-de-Vicq/Bost/Saint-Christophe (11)	0–3	US Trezelles (10)
91.	AS Ménulphienne (11)	1–1 (12–11 p)	AS Neuilly-le-Réal (10)
92.	AS Saint-Angel (11)	2–3	JS Neuvy (10)
93.	Entente Pierrefitte/Saligny Foot (11)	0–2	US Lusigny (11)
94.	AS Boucetoise (11)	1–3	Espoir Molinetois (11)
95.	AS Chassenard Luneau (11)	1–2	Ballon Beaulonnais (11)
96.	CS Thielois (11)	1–1 (7–8 p)	AS Val de Sioule (10)
97.	AS Espinasse-Vozelle (12)	5–1	US Hyds (11)
98.	ALS Chamblet (12)	4–4 (4–2 p)	AS Néris (11)
99.	FA Le Teil Melas (12)	2–4	FC Rochegudien (11)
100.	OS Vallée de l'Ouvèze (12)	0–3	ES Malissardoise (11)
101.	US Pailhares-Lalouvesc (13)	0–5	ES Le Laris-Montchenu (13)
102.	CS Malataverne (13)	1–3	SC Bourguésan (13)
103.	US Meysse (13)	1–3	FC Saint-Restitut (13)
104.	CS Lapeyrousien (13)	7–0	FC Rochepaule (13)
105.	FC Saillans (13)	1–2	JS Livron (12)
106.	FC Royans Vercors (13)	4–8	FC Goubetois (12)
107.	SC Romans (13)	3–2	AS Saint-Marcelloise (12)
108.	FC Larnage-Serves (12)	6–1	EA Montvendre (12)
109.	CO Châteauneuf-du-Rhône (12)	1–0	US Veyras (12)
110.	RC Savasson (12)	4–0	US Vals-les-Bains (12)
111.	US Baixoise (12)	0–3	AF Ceven (12)
112.	Olympique Saint-Montanais (12)	5–0	AS Portugaise Valence (12)
113.	FC Clérieux-Saint-Bardoux-Granges-les-Beaumont (12)	4–0	FC Montmiral Parnans (12)
114.	Vivar's Club Soyons (13)	0–3	ÉS Saint-Jeure-d'Ay-Marsan (12)
115.	AS Cancoise (12)	2–3	Vallis Auréa Foot (11)
116.	AS Saint-Barthélemy-Grozon (12)	0–0 (5–4 p)	US Val d'Ay (11)
117.	FC Berzème (12)	1–4	AS Roussas-Granges-Gontardes (11)
118.	FC Baume Bouchet Montségur (12)	2–4	US Ancône (11)
119.	FC Sauzet (12)	2–2 (3–5 p)	US Beaufort-Aouste (11)
120.	FC Cheylarois (12)	1–5	US Montélier (11)
121.	US Peyrins (12)	1–1 (2–4 p) (Note: AS Homenetmen Bourg-lès Valence penalised for fielding an ineligible player, US Peyrins qualify.)	AS Homenetmen Bourg-lès Valence (11)
122.	US Montmeyran (12)	2–2 (4–2 p) (Note: US Montmeyran penalised for fielding a player without a valid medical certificate, Diois FC qualify.)	Diois FC (10)
123.	AC Allet (12)	3–3 (3–4 p)	FC 540 (11)
124.	SA Saint-Agrève (12)	0–1	US Drôme Provence (11)
125.	FC Rambertois (12)	0–7	AS Cornas (10)
126.	JS Saint-Paul-lès-Romans (12)	1–2	US Saint-Gervais-sur-Roubion (11)
127.	AS Dolon (11)	0–2	RC Tournon-Tain (11)
128.	ES Nord Drôme (12)	3–0	FC Portois (11)
129.	FC Hermitage (11)	0–1	AS Vallée du Doux (11)
130.	AS Génissieux (11)	0–3	US Vallée du Jabron (10)
131.	AS Valensolles (11)	3–2	FC Colombier Saint-Barthélemy (11)
132.	US Saint-Martinoise (11)	2–2 (4–2 p)	AAJ Saint-Alban-d'Ay (11)
133.	FC Bourguisan (11)	0–5	US Mours (9)
134.	FC Bren (11)	3–3 (4–2 p)	US Pont-La Roche (10)
135.	FC Plateau Ardèchois (11)	2–2 (3–1 p)	ES Boulieu-lès-Annonay (10)
136.	US Bas-Vivarais (10)	1–1 (8–7 p)	FC Montélimar (9)
137.	FC Châtelet (10)	0–2	US Davézieux-Vidalon (9)
138.	CO Donzère (10)	3–0	US Rochemaure (10)
139.	FC Aubenas (11)	1–8	Olympique Centre Ardèche (9)
140.	US Saint-Just-Saint-Marcel (10)	2–0	AS Berg-Helvie (9)
141.	CO Châteauneuvois (10)	0–1	Entente Sarras Sports Saint-Vallier (9)
142.	US Portes Hautes Cévennes (9)	1–1 (6–5 p)	ES Chomérac (9)
143.	FC Félines-Saint-Cyr-Peaugres (11)	1–5	PS Romanaise (9)
144.	FC Hauterives/US Grand Serre (10)	2–1	FR Allan (10)
145.	FC Muzolais (10)	2–2 (1–4 p)	FC Bourg-lès-Valence (10)
146.	IF Barbières-Bésayes-Rochefort-Samson-Marches (11)	1–1 (5–4 p)	Olympique Ruomsois (10)
147.	US Lussas (11)	1–4	Espérance Hostunoise (9)
148.	US Chanas Sablons Serrières (10)	0–2	ES Beaumonteleger (9)
149.	Allex-Chabrillan-Eurre FC (11)	1–5	FC Tricastin (11)
150.	RC Mauves (10)	4–1	US Chatte (12) (Note: US Chatte replaced SC Cruas in the draw.)
151.	ES Saint-Alban Auriolles-Grospierres (12)	2–1	FC Saint-Didier-sous-Aubenas (11)
152.	ABH FC (11)	1–2	ES Saint-Christo-Marcenod (9)
153.	FC Commelle-Vernay (11)	2–1	ES Champdieu-Marcilly (9)
154.	US Filerin (11)	0–5	US Ecotay-Moingt (10)
155.	FC Saint-Joseph-Saint-Martin (11)	1–3	Haut Pilat Interfoot (9)
156.	JS Cellieu (10)	2–5	GS Dervaux Chambon-Feugerolles (9)
157.	FC Boisset-Chalain (11)	3–3 (4–3 p)	CS Crémeaux (10)
158.	Toranche FC (10)	0–2	Anzieux Foot (9)
159.	FC Plaine Cleppé/Poncins (11)	1–2	ES Dyonisienne (10)
160.	Rhins Trambouze Foot (10)	0–2	JSO Givors (9)
161.	Olympique du Montcel (11)	1–1 (3–2 p)	AS Chambéon-Magneux (9)
162.	Lignon FC (10)	2–5	US Bussières (10)
163.	AS Astrée (11)	0–3	US L'Horme (9)
164.	ES Saint-Jean-Bonnefonds (11)	1–6	Forez Donzy FC (10)
165.	Périgneux Saint-Maurice Foot (10)	1–6	AS Saint-Just-Saint-Rambert (9)
166.	AS Saint-Symphorien-de-Lay (11)	0–2	FC Saint-Étienne (9)
167.	US Villerest (11)	1–0	AS Châteauneuf (9)
168.	AS Noirétable (11)	0–1	Sorbiers-La Talaudière (9)
169.	Saint-Étienne UC Terrenoire (11)	2–2 (2–4 p)	Roanne AS Parc du Sport (9)
170.	AS Chausseterre Les Salles (12)	0–14	FCI Saint-Romain-le-Puy (10)
171.	US Parigny Saint-Cyr (12)	2–0	FC Belette de Saint-Léger (11)
172.	Bellegarde Sports (12)	1–0	US Métare Saint-Étienne Sud Est (11)
173.	AS Cordelle (12)	1–5	Mably Sport (11)
174.	FR Moulins-Cherier (12)	0–2	FC Montagnes du Matin (11)
175.	FC Genilac (12)	2–2 (3–1 p)	FC Loire Sornin (10)
176.	FC Montagny (12)	0–3	GOAL Foot (10)
177.	AS La Chaumière (12)	2–0	GS Chasse (10)
178.	AS Verrières (13)	0–2	Nord Roannais (11)
179.	AS Villers (11)	2–2 (0–3 p) (Note: Victory subsequently removed from Olympique Le Coteau, who were removed from the competition after the fourth round.)	Olympique Le Coteau (10)
180.	FC Perreux (11)	4–1	ES Montrond Cuzieu (10)
181.	SC Piraillon (12)	2–4	CO La Rivière (10)
182.	US Briennon (11)	2–2 (5–4 p)	Olympique Est Roannais (10)
183.	FC Ouches (12)	1–4	FC Bonson-Saint-Cyprien (11)
184.	SS Ussonaise (11)	0–3	USG La Fouillouse (10)
185.	Olympique Terrenoire (12)	1–3	OC Ondaine (11)
186.	AS Saint-Just-en-Chevalet (12)	2–2 (6–7 p)	Riorges FC' (11)
187.	FC Le Creux (13)	3–2	FC Bords de Loire (12)
188.	US Monts du Forez (13)	0–7	FC Marcellinois (11)
189.	US Sud Forézienne (13)	1–8	ES Haut Forez (12)
190.	Sury SC (12)	1–4	FC Feu Vert Saint-Chamond (10)
191.	Vourey Sports (13)	1–6	FC Liers (12)
192.	Pays d'Allevard FC (12)	2–2 (2–4 p)	US Saint-Paul-de-Varces (11)
193.	US La Bâtie-Divisin (13)	0–2	ASL Saint-Cassien (10)
194.	Crémieu FC (13)	3–2	Olympique Les Avenières (12)
195.	AS La Sanne (11)	3–3 (10–9 p)	US Reventin (10)
196.	CS Miribel (12)	2–6	US Saint-Geoire-en-Valdaine (12)
197.	US Beauvoir-Royas (12)	1–5	AS Crossey (11)
198.	US Le Bouchage (13)	2–4	US Montgasconnaise (12)
199.	CS Faramans (11)	2–0	Formafoot Bièvre Valloire (10)
200.	AS Saint-Lattier (12)	2–0	US Ro-Claix (11)
201.	Claix Football (11)	2–4	US Jarrie-Champ (10)
202.	Union Nord Iséroise Foot (11)	5–1	Moirans FC (10)
203.	FC Lauzes (11)	3–2	CS Ozon (11)
204.	EF des Étangs (12)	1–2	AS Oyeu Burcin (11)
205.	AS Saint-Joseph-de-Rivière (12)	3–6	US Thodure (11)
206.	FC Sud Isère (11)	1–1 (3–1 p)	AS Italienne Européenne Grenoble (9)
207.	Deux Rochers FC (11)	2–1	Stade Chabonnais (10)
208.	FC Saint-Martin-d'Uriage (11)	0–2	JS Saint-Georgeoise (10)
209.	Beaucroissant FC (10)	1–4	FC Seyssins (9)
210.	CS Voreppe (10)	3–3 (3–1 p)	AJA Villeneuve (9)
211.	Le Grand-Lemps/Colombe/Apprieu Foot 38 (11)	1–5	US Gières (9)
212.	US Abbaye (11)	5–0	FC Pont de Claix (12)
213.	FC Canton de Vinay (13)	1–1 (3–2 p)	USÉ Antonine (12)
214.	FC Vallée de l'Hien (11)	1–2	Olympique Nord Dauphiné (10)
215.	RC Bouvesse (11)	2–2 (3–2 p)	Vallée du Guiers FC (9)
216.	AS Chaveyriat-Chanoz (12)	5–0	CS Chevroux (11)
217.	Eclose Châteauvilain Badinières Football (11)	2–2 (5–4 p)	Artas Charantonnay FC (11)
218.	AS Ver Sau (10)	4–3	US Village Olympique Grenoble (9)
219.	FC Chirens (11)	0–1	Saint-Martin-d'Hères FC (10)
220.	Isle d'Abeau FC (11)	0–8 (Note: Match abandoned at half time after the captain of Isle d'Abeau FC informed the referee that 4 players were injured and unable to continue the game, thus reducing the team to less than 8 players. FC Pays Voironnais qualify.)	FC Pays Voironnais (10)
221.	AS Vertrieu (12)	0–1	FC Côtière-Luenaz (10)
222.	FC Veyle-Vieux-Jonc (12)	0–2	FC Manziat (10)
223.	Olympique Buyatin (11)	2–4	US Plaine de l'Ain (11)
224.	CO Plateau (12)	0–2	Olympique Saint-Denis-lès-Bourg (10)
225.	FC Turc Virieu (13)	3–1	Association des Portugais d'Oyonnax (11)
226.	CS Valromey (13)	0–3	Olympique Sud Revermont 01 (10)
227.	CSJ Châtillonnaise (11)	0–3	Bourg Sud (9)
228.	US Vaux-en-Bugey (11)	0–4	Bresse Foot 01 (9)
229.	AS Grièges Pont de Veyle (12)	0–8	FC Bord de Veyle (11)
230.	ES Val de Saône (10)	0–2	ES Cormoranche (12)
231.	AS Portugaise Vaulx-en-Velin (11)	5–2	Chaleyssin-Valencin-Luxinay 38 FC (10)
232.	FC Curtafond-Confrançon-Saint-Martin-Saint-Didier (10)	1–2 (Note: Plaine Revermont Foot penalised after fielding a suspended player, FC Curtafond-Confrançon-Saint-Martin-Saint-Didier qualify.)	Plaine Revermont Foot (10)
233.	US Replonges (10)	1–3	AS Guéreins-Genouilleux (9)
234.	AS Bâgé-le-Châtel (11)	0–0 (1–4 p)	AS Attignat (10)
235.	FO Bourg-en-Bresse (11)	0–3	ES Foissiat-Étrez (9)
236.	Côtière Meximieux Villieu (11)	3–3 (4–3 p)	AS Toussieu (11)
237.	SC Mille Étangs (12)	2–4	AS Genay (11)
238.	FC Reneins Vauxonne (10)	4–1	Centre Dombes Football (10)
239.	Jassans-Frans Foot (9)	2–2 (4–2 p)	FC Bully (11)
240.	Fareins Saône Vallée Foot (11)	0–1	Beaujolais Football (10)
241.	FC Mas-Rillier (11)	2–2 (5–3 p)	Villeurbanne United FC (12)
242.	FC des Collines (11)	3–0	AS Rhodanienne (10)
243.	FC Tignieu-Jameyzieu (11)	2–2 (4–3 p)	Association Chandieu-Heyrieux (9)
244.	Eyzin-Saint-Sorlin FC (12)	4–5	FC Ternay (10)
245.	FC Montluel (12)	1–1 (3–4 p)	FC Lyon Croix-Rousse (11) (Note: Original draw featured Lyon Croix-Rousse Football, who merged with FC Croix Roussien after the draw was made.)
246.	US Villette-d'Anthon-Janneyrais (11)	0–4	Olympique Villefontaine (9)
247.	CS Nivolas-Vermelle (11)	2–0	Saint-Alban Sportif (10)
248.	FC Saint-Cyr Ampuis (12)	3–0	AS Manissieux Saint-Priest (13)
249.	FC Turcs Verpillière (12)	3–3 (11–12 p)	Muroise Foot (11)
250.	FC Priay (12)	3–3 (7–8 p)	US Montanay (10)
251.	Foot Trois Rivières (11)	1–0	ES Frontonas-Chamagnieu (11)
252.	Olympic Sathonay Foot (11)	1–1 (5–3 p)	Ambérieu FC (11)
253.	AS Saint-Étienne-sur-Chalaronne (12)	0–0 (7–8 p)	Caluire SC (10)
254.	ISN FC Chaniens (12)	2–2 (4–5 p)	US Formans (12)
255.	AS Brignais (10)	0–3	AC Rive-de-Gier (9)
256.	Chazay FC (10)	0–6	FC Mont Brouilly (9)
257.	FC La Giraudière (11)	0–5	ÉS Liergues (9)
258.	US Cheminots Lyon Vaise (11)	2–1	FC Point du Jour (10)
259.	FC Franc Lyonnais (11)	2–3	FC Pays de l'Arbresle (9)
260.	Saône Mont d'Or FC (10)	5–2	SC Portes de l'Ain (10)
261.	ES Gleizé (12)	0–3	Savigny FC (10)
262.	FC Franchevillois (11)	4–2	FC Lamure Poule (10)
263.	Éveil de Lyon (10)	3–2	AS Bron Grand Lyon (9)
264.	Mions FC (10)	0–3	ES Genas Azieu (9)
265.	AS Grézieu-la-Varenne (11)	1–5	Olympique Rillieux (9)
266.	SC Revolée (11)	0–3	US Loire-Saint-Romain (10)
267.	Rhône Sud FC (12)	2–2 (5–4 p)	AS Pusignan (11)
268.	US Côteaux Lyonnais (12)	1–3	OS Beaujolais (11)
269.	ES Charly Foot (11)	0–3	AS Algerienne Villeurbanne (9)
270.	Chambost-Allières-Saint-Just-d'Avray (11)	1–5	Belleville Football Beaujolais (10)
271.	Lyon Ouest SC (10)	1–3	CS Meginand (9)
272.	US Des Monts (11)	2–2 (5–4 p)	AS Bellecour-Perrache (9)
273.	ES Saint-Priest (11)	1–6	US Millery-Vourles (9)
274.	CS Anatolia (12)	1–1 (2–4 p)	RC Béligny (10)
275.	US Ouest Lyonnais (11)	4–3	FC Sévenne (10)
276.	Latino AFC Lyon (11)	2–1	AS Saint-Forgeux (9)
277.	AS Limas (12)	0–1	AS Sornins Réunis (11)
278.	SC Maccabi Lyon (11)	3–2	FC Sud Ouest 69 (9)
279.	US Vaulx-en-Velin (12)	1–3	US Est Lyonnais (9)
280.	ACS Mayotte du Rhône (12)	0–1	FC Gerland Lyon (9)
281.	FC Tarare (11)	0–3	FC Denicé Arnas (10)
282.	ASM Saint-Pierre-la-Palud (10)	3–4	Haute Brévenne Football (9)
283.	US Meyzieu (10)	3–6	Feyzin Club Belle Étoile (9)
284.	AS Diémoz (10)	2–4	Olympique Vaulx-en-Velin (9)
285.	FC Sainte-Foy-lès-Lyon (11)	1–4	FC Meys-Grézieu (10)
286.	FC Virieu-Valondras (12)	9–0 (Note: Match abandoned after RC Hilairois were reduced to less than 8 players when 3 players simultaneously left the field due to injuries in the last minute of the first half. FC Virieu-Valondras qualify.)	RC Hilairois (13)
287.	FC Haut de Chambéry (12)	1–6	US Creys-Morestel (10)
288.	AS Cessieu (13)	0–8	AS La Bridoire (13)
289.	AS Barberaz (11)	1–3	US Dolomoise (10)
290.	FC La Sure (11)	9–2	FC Apremont (11)
291.	US Cassolards Passageois (12)	2–2 (4–3 p)	Chambéry Sport 73 (11)
292.	FC Sud Lac (10)	1–2	US Ruy Montceau (10)
293.	Noyarey FC (11)	1–2	Entente Val d'Hyères (9)
294.	AS Tullins-Fures (10)	2–2 (4–1 p)	US Pontoise (9)
295.	AS Grésivaudan (12)	3–2	Cognin Sports (9)
296.	US Corbelin (11)	4–0	Association Portugaise Croix Rouge Chambéry (9)
297.	US Domessin (11)	1–3	Rives SF (10)
298.	FC Saint-Badolph (11)	0–2	AS Vézeronce-Huert (9)
299.	Challes SF (11)	2–1	FC Balmes Nord-Isère (11)
300.	FC Versoud (10)	1–4 (Note: Original match abandoned after 62 minutes due to serious injury. Match replayed on 3 September 2023.)	Cœur de Savoie (10)
301.	CA Goncelin (13)	0–1	FC Villargondran (11)
302.	ASJF Domène (11)	2–1 (Note: ASJF Domène penalised for fielding a suspended player, CA Maurienne qualify.)	CA Maurienne (9)
303.	ES Lanfonnet (11)	2–1	FC Haute Tarentaise (9)
304.	AS Mont Jovet Bozel (11)	0–3	AS Cuines-La Chambre Val d'Arc (10)
305.	FC Artemare (12)	0–5	US La Ravoire (10)
306.	AS Novalaise (11)	1–1 (4–3 p)	FC Serrières-Villebois (10)
307.	FC Laissaud (10)	1–0	CS Belley (9)
308.	AS Marin (12)	1–5	FC Cluses (10)
309.	ES Thyez (10)	3–2	Pays de Gex FC (9)
310.	FC Marigny (12)	0–10	AS Portugais Faverges (11)
311.	SC Morzine Vallée d'Aulps (10)	1–0	CS Ayze (9)
312.	AS Thonon (11)	1–0	Marignier Sports (10)
313.	FC Anthy Sport (12)	1–6	FC Ballaison (9)
314.	FC Les Carroz (13)	2–2 (2–5 p)	CS Veigy-Foncenex (11)
315.	FC Leman Presqu'île (12)	0–1	AS Le Lyaud-Armoy (10)
316.	CA Bonnevillois 1921 (10)	0–1	US Mont Blanc (9)
317.	FC Gavot (11)	2–2 (3–5 p)	JS Reignier (9)
318.	FRS Champanges (11)	1–5	US Annemasse-Ambilly-Gaillard (9)
319.	FC Évian (12)	0–11	ES Fillinges (10)
320.	US Pers-Jussy (11)	4–4 (4–3 p)	Haut Giffre FC (10)
321.	FC Saint-Sergues (12)	0–7	FC Cruseilles (9)
322.	AS Prévessin-Moëns (11)	1–0	ES Saint-Jeoire-La Tour (10)
323.	FC Des Salèves (13)	0–3	Échenevex-Ségny-Chevry Olympique (10)
324.	AS Versonnex-Grilly-Sauvergny (13)	1–11	ES Douvaine-Loisin (10)
325.	FC Les Houches-Servoz (12)	1–5	ES Amancy (10)
326.	FC Villy-le-Pelloux (12)	3–0	CS Chamonix (12)
327.	FC La Filière (10)	1–0	ES Cernex (9)
328.	US Argonay (10)	1–3	CS Saint-Pierre (10)
329.	FC Vuache (12)	0–5	CSA Poisy (10)
330.	CS Vacheresse Vallée d'Abondance (12)	2–5	AG Bons-en-Chablais (9)
331.	AS Évires (11)	3–1	ÉS Bourget-du-Lac (11)
332.	FC La Rochette (12)	1–1 (4–2 p)	FC Saint-Michel Sports (11) (Note: FC Saint-Michel Sports replaced ES Seynod in the draw.)
333.	CA Yennne (11)	3–1	AS Portugais Annecy (11)
334.	FC Aravis (12)	1–2	US Grand Mont La Bâthie (11)
335.	EF Chautagne (10)	1–1 (3–1 p)	AS Genevois (10)
336.	Olympique Cran (12)	1–10	UO Albertville (9)
337.	US Grignon (11)	2–2 (2–3 p)	FC Chéran (11)
338.	USC Aiguebelle (10)	5–1	AS Lac Bleu (11)
339.	CO Chavanod (10)	2–0	FC Belle Étoile Mercury (9)
340.	AS Haute Combe de Savoie (12)	2–4	US Modane (10)
341.	Entente Saint-Martin-du-Frêne/Maillat/Combe du Val (11)	1–4	FC Cranves-Sales (11)
342.	US Veyziat (11)	2–3	AJ Ville-la-Grand (11)
343.	AS Épagny-Metz-Tessy (12)	1–1 (5–4 p)	US Culoz Grand Colombier (10)
344.	AS Montagny (12)	0–0 (3–4 p)	FC Thônes (10)
345.	AS Ugine (10)	1–1 (4–5 p)	AS Parmelan Villaz (11)
346.	FC Frangy (11)	5–1	Olympique Rives de l'Ain-Pays du Cerdon (9)
347.	ES Meythet (11)	1–1 (6–7 p)	Valserhône FC (9)
348.	AS Izernore Nurieux-Volognat (10)	6–0	Foot Sud Gessien (10)
349.	US Vétraz-Monthoux (11)	2–3	US Nantua (10)
350.	AS Anglefort (12)	0–3	ES Valleiry (10)
351.	Union Salève Foot (11)	3–5	AS Travailleurs Turcs Oyonnax (9)
352.	FC Semine (11)	1–4	ES Revermontoise (9)
353.	US Challex (12)	0–1	US Arbent Marchon (10)

=== Second round ===
These matches were played on 1, 2, 3, 9 and 10 September 2023.

Second Round Results: Auvergne-Rhône-Alpes
Tie no	Home team (Tier)	Score	Away team (Tier)
1.	CS Vézac (10)	0–5	La Chapelle/Saint-Poncy FC (11)
2.	AS Yolet (10)	1–2	FC Ally Mauriac (8)
3.	Aspre FC Fontanges (11)	0–8	Parlan-Le Rouget FC (8)
4.	ES Pierrefortaise (10)	1–3	Jordanne FC (10)
5.	US Crandelles (9)	1–1 (5–4 p)	Ytrac Foot (7)
6.	AS Pleaux-Rilhac-Barriac (10)	1–1 (6–5 p)	CS Arpajonnais (9)
7.	AS Espinat (9)	4–1	Carladez-Goul Sportif (10)
8.	FC Artense (10)	1–2	US Vallée de l'Authre (7)
9.	AS Chaudes-Aigues (11)	1–3	FC Moussages (10)
10.	AS Sansacoise (9)	2–2 (4–2 p)	US Murat (8)
11.	Sud Cantal Foot (9)	2–0	ES Riomois-Condat (8)
12.	FC Minier (10)	1–7	FC Massiac-Molompize-Blesle (8)
13.	AS Belbexoise (9)	0–2	FC Junhac-Montsalvy (9)
14.	FC des Quatre Vallées (10)	0–5	Entente Nord Lozère (7)
15.	AS Enval-Marsat (9)	0–3	FC Cournon-d'Auvergne (7)
16.	FC Mirefleurs (10)	0–3	Dômes-Sancy Foot (8)
17.	FC Blanzat (9)	1–2	Ambert Livradois Sud (8)
18.	CS Saint-Anthème (12)	2–3	US Vic-le-Comte (8)
19.	ÉS Arconsat (10)	4–4 (2–4 p)	FC Martres-Lussat (8)
20.	JS Saint-Priest-des-Champs (9)	0–0 (6–5 p)	US Orcet (8)
21.	ES Volcans Malauzat (11)	1–9	US Saint-Beauzire (8)
22.	FC Saint-Julien-de-Coppel (10)	0–0 (3–4 p)	US Ennezat (8)
23.	AS Châteaugay (12)	0–4	Cébazat Sports (8)
24.	Ecureuils Franc Rosier (9)	1–3	EFC Saint-Amant-Tallende (8)
25.	US Saint-Gervaisienne (10)	3–3 (4–3 p)	US Les Martres-de-Veyre (8)
26.	AS Romagnat (9)	1–2	CS Pont-du-Château (8)
27.	Entente Charblot (11)	1–2	US Bassin Minier (9)
28.	FC Clermont International (12)	0–11	FC Châtel-Guyon (7)
29.	AS Orcines (9)	4–5	US Mozac (7)
30.	ALS Besse Egliseneuve (9)	0–6	Lempdes Sport (7)
31.	US Beauregard-Vendon (12)	1–1 (6–5 p)	US Ménétrol (11)
32.	Aulnat Sportif (10)	4–2	US Limons (9)
33.	Clermont Ouvoimoja (9)	1–0	FA Le Cendre (7)
34.	FC Mezel (9)	2–1	Association des Guinéens de la Région Auvergne FC (10)
35.	Entente Vallée de la Dordogne (10)	8–2	FC Thiers Auvergne (10)
36.	FC Vertaizon (9)	0–1	AS Cellule (10)
37.	UJ Clermontoise (9)	1–3	Espérance Ceyratois Football (7)
38.	FC Plauzat-Champeix (10)	0–2	AS Saint-Genès-Champanelle (7)
39.	Durolle Foot (10)	0–3	US Issoire (7)
40.	AS Grazac-Lapte (9)	2–8	Sauveteurs Brivois (7)
41.	AS Cheminots Langeac (10)	0–1	US Fontannoise (8)
42.	Seauve Sports (9)	1–1 (4–2 p)	FC Saint-Germain-Laprade (8)
43.	AS Pertuis (10)	1–1 (4–3 p)	Vigilante Saint-Pal-de-Mons (10)
44.	AS Villettoise (10)	2–2 (2–3 p)	Olympic Saint-Julien-Chapteuil (8)
45.	US Montfaucon Montregard Raucoules (11)	6–1	US Landos (9)
46.	CO Coubon (10)	1–3	AS Chadrac (8)
47.	Solignac-Cussac FC (9)	0–2	SC Langogne (8)
48.	Haut Lignon Football (10)	2–2 (2–4 p)	Association Vergongheon-Arvant (7)
49.	AS Laussonne (10)	1–0	AS Emblavez-Vorey (8)
50.	FC Vézézoux (10)	0–5	AS Saint-Didier-Saint-Just (8)
51.	AS Jonzieux (12)	0–9	US Brioude (7)
52.	FC Aurec (9)	2–1	US Bains-Saint-Christophe (9)
53.	US Vals Le Puy (9)	0–3	US Sucs et Lignon (7)
54.	AS Mayotte FC Bellerive (11)	2–3	AC Creuzier-le-Vieux (8)
55.	AS Dompierroise (9)	1–4	AS Cheminots Saint-Germain (8)
56.	CS Chantelle (12)	2–3	SCA Cussét (8)
57.	US Bien-Assis (10)	0–1	US Lignerolles-Lavault Sainte-Anne Prémilhat (8)
58.	AS Tronget (10)	3–2	US Abrest (10)
59.	FC Souvigny (9)	1–1 (5–6 p)	US Vendat Bellerive Brugheas (8)
60.	AS Louchy (9)	1–0	CS Cosne d'Allier (10)
61.	CS Bessay (9)	3–4	US Chevagnes (10)
62.	Montluçon FC (11)	1–1 (2–4 p)	US Busset (12)
63.	AS Moissat (9)	1–4	US Coeur Allier (10)
64.	US Varennes-sur-Tèche (11)	1–6	Stade Saint-Yorre (8)
65.	CS Vaux-Estivareilles (9)	10–3	CS Saint-Bonnet-près-Riom (9)
66.	Étoile Moulins Yzeure (9)	0–0 (3–4 p)	Bourbon Sportif (8)
67.	Entente US Saulcet-Le Theil/AS Bransat (11)	1–3	SC Avermes (9)
68.	AL Quinssaines (9)	1–3	US Biachette Désertines (10)
69.	FC Haut d'Allier (10)	4–1	US Saint-Victor-Malescours (10)
70.	US Trezelles (10)	2–0	JS Neuvy (10)
71.	AS Ménulphienne (11)	0–6	Bézenet-Doyet Foot (8)
72.	US Lusigny (11)	4–0	Ballon Beaulonnais (11)
73.	Espoir Molinetois (11)	1–1 (6–5 p)	AS Espinasse-Vozelle (12)
74.	ALS Chamblet (12)	0–4	AS Val de Sioule (10)
75.	ES Montagne Bourbonnaise (10)	1–5	Commentry FC (8)
76.	FC Rochegudien (11)	3–2	ES Malissardoise (11)
77.	ES Le Laris-Montchenu (13)	3–2	CS Lapeyrousien (13)
78.	SC Bourguésan (13)	0–3	JS Livron (12)
79.	FC Saint-Restitut (13)	0–2	CO Châteauneuf-du-Rhône (12)
80.	FC Goubetois (12)	1–5	FC Larnage-Serves (12)
81.	SC Romans (13)	2–2 (4–3 p)	Olympique Saint-Montanais (12)
82.	AF Ceven (12)	4–0	RC Savasson (12)
83.	Vallis Auréa Foot (11)	4–0	FC Clérieux-Saint-Bardoux-Granges-les-Beaumont (12)
84.	ÉS Saint-Jeure-d'Ay-Marsan (12)	2–3	US Montélier (11)
85.	AS Saint-Barthélemy-Grozon (12)	1–1 (3–2 p)	US Peyrins (12)
86.	AS Roussas-Granges-Gontardes (11)	2–3	US Ancône (11)
87.	US Beaufort-Aouste (11)	2–2 (0–3 p)	Diois FC (10)
88.	FC 540 (11)	1–1 (3–4 p)	RC Tournon-Tain (11)
89.	AS Cornas (10)	5–0	US Saint-Gervais-sur-Roubion (11)
90.	US Drôme Provence (11)	1–1 (4–3 p)	ES Nord Drôme (12)
91.	AS Vallée du Doux (11)	1–5	RC Mauves (10)
92.	ES Saint-Alban Auriolles-Grospierres (12)	1–1 (1–3 p)	US Vallée du Jabron (10)
93.	FC Bren (11)	1–2	FC Péageois (8)
94.	AS La Sanne (11)	1–1 (4–2 p)	AS Roiffieux (11)
95.	AS Coucouron (11)	1–2	Olympique Centre Ardèche (9)
96.	US Saint-Just-Saint-Marcel (10)	0–1	Entente Crest-Aouste (7)
97.	CO Donzère (10)	5–2	FC Chabeuil (8)
98.	US Saint-Martinoise (11)	1–5	AS Véore Montoison (8)
99.	ES Beaumonteleger (9)	1–1 (3–1 p)	Football Mont-Pilat (8)
100.	Entente Sarras Sports Saint-Vallier (9)	3–2	ASF Pierrelatte (8)
101.	FC Hauterives/US Grand Serre (10)	2–1	FC Valdaine (8)
102.	FC Bourg-lès-Valence (10)	0–1	UMS Montélimar (8)
103.	FC Plateau Ardèchois (11)	0–3	AS Donatienne (8)
104.	US Portes Hautes Cévennes (9)	1–4	Rhône Crussol Foot 07 (8)
105.	FC Tricastin (11)	1–1 (2–3 p)	AS Valensolles (11)
106.	IF Barbières-Bésayes-Rochefort-Samson-Marches (11)	1–5	Valence FC (8)
107.	US Bas-Vivarais (10)	3–3 (5–4 p)	FC Annonay (8)
108.	Espérance Hostunoise (9)	1–1 (5–4 p)	FC Eyrieux Embroye (8)
109.	US Mours (9)	4–2	PS Romanaise (9)
110.	ES Saint-Christo-Marcenod (9)	1–0	AS Varennes-sur-Allier (8)
111.	FC Commelle-Vernay (11)	2–3	AS Algérienne Chambon-Feugerolles (8)
112.	FC Saint-Étienne (9)	2–2 (4–2 p)	SEL Saint-Priest-en-Jarez (8)
113.	Nord Roannais (11)	0–4	FC Saint-Paul-en-Jarez (8)
114.	ES Dyonisienne (10)	2–6	US Villars (8)
115.	FC Montagnes du Matin (11)	1–4	AF Pays de Coise (8)
116.	US Briennon (11)	1–6	US Saint-Galmier-Chambœuf (8)
117.	Roanne AS Parc du Sport (9)	0–12	Roannais Foot 42 (7)
118.	FC Boisset-Chalain (11)	1–2	FC Saint-Martin-la-Sauveté (11)
119.	OC Ondaine (11)	1–1 (4–3 p)	ES Veauche (7)
120.	FC Marcellinois (11)	0–7	L'Étrat-La Tour Sportif (7)
121.	Bellegarde Sports (12)	0–2	Saint-Chamond Foot (7)
122.	US Parigny Saint-Cyr (12)	0–4	FCO Firminy-Insersport (7)
123.	FC Perreux (11)	0–0 (4–5 p)	Côte Chaude Sportif (7)
124.	Olympique du Montcel (11)	2–1	Avenir Côte Foot (10)
125.	FC Bonson-Saint-Cyprien (11)	1–4	FC Roche-Saint-Genest (7)
126.	US Ecotay-Moingt (10)	0–2	FCI Saint-Romain-le-Puy (10)
127.	Olympique Le Coteau (10)	4–1	US Bussières (10)
128.	Riorges FC (11)	1–1 (4–5 p)	FC Genilac (12)
129.	FC Feu Vert Saint-Chamond (10)	2–3	CO La Rivière (10)
130.	Mably Sport (11)	1–7	Haut Pilat Interfoot (9)
131.	ES Haut Forez (12)	0–4	Sorbiers-La Talaudière (9)
132.	FC Le Creux (13)	1–2	US Villerest (11)
133.	AS La Chaumière (12)	1–1 (6–5 p)	JSO Givors (9)
134.	GOAL Foot (10)	1–2	USG La Fouillouse (10)
135.	Anzieux Foot (9)	0–1	AS Saint-Just-Saint-Rambert (9)
136.	GS Dervaux Chambon-Feugerolles (9)	1–0	Forez Donzy FC (10)
137.	FC Liers (12)	1–1 (2–3 p)	Saint-Quentin-Fallavier FC (10)
138.	US Saint-Paul-de-Varces (11)	0–2	US Sassenage (10)
139.	ASL Saint-Cassien (10)	2–5	Football Côte Saint-André (8)
140.	US Saint-Geoire-en-Valdaine (12)	15–0	Crémieu FC (13)
141.	AS Crossey (11)	3–0	US Montgasconnaise (12)
142.	US Jarrie-Champ (10)	3–3 (5–4 p)	CS Faramans (11)
143.	AS Saint-Lattier (12)	1–4	Union Nord Iséroise Foot (11)
144.	FC Lauzes (11)	3–2	AS Buers Villeurbanne (10)
145.	AS Oyeu Burcin (11)	1–1 (0–3 p)	US Thodure (11)
146.	FC Sud Isère (11)	2–3	Olympique Saint-Marcellin (7)
147.	Deux Rochers FC (11)	3–2	FC Crolles-Bernin (8)
148.	JS Saint-Georgeoise (10)	2–5	CS Voreppe (10)
149.	FC Seyssins (9)	3–1	AS Saint-André-le-Gaz (8)
150.	US Gières (9)	4–3	US La Murette (8)
151.	US Abbaye (11)	1–2	FC Vallée de la Gresse (8)
152.	FC Canton de Vinay (13)	0–7	RC Bouvesse (11)
153.	AS Chaveyriat-Chanoz (12)	3–4	ACC Franco Turc Bourg-en-Bresse (12)
154.	Saint-Martin-d'Hères FC (10)	4–0	Eclose Châteauvilain Badinières Football (11)
155.	AS Ver Sau (10)	0–2	ES Rachais (8)
156.	FC Pays Voironnais (10)	– (Note: Match abandoned due to pitch invasion. FC Pays Voironnais penalised, AS Portugaise Vaulx-en-Velin qualify.)	AS Portugaise Vaulx-en-Velin (11)
157.	FC Côtière-Luenaz (10)	– (Note: Match abandoned, both teams penalised.)	UGA Lyon-Décines (8)
158.	FC Manziat (10)	0–1	Oyonnax Plastics Vallée FC (7)
159.	Olympique Saint-Denis-lès-Bourg (10)	0–3	Olympique Sud Revermont 01 (10)
160.	Bourg Sud (9)	1–0	FC Dombes-Bresse (8)
161.	Bresse Foot 01 (9)	1–2	CS Lagnieu (8)
162.	FC Bord de Veyle (11)	0–4	AS Montréal-la-Cluse (8)
163.	FC Curtafond-Confrançon-Saint-Martin-Saint-Didier (10)	1–3	FC Plaine Tonique (8)
164.	AS Guéreins-Genouilleux (9)	0–5	FC Veyle Sâone (8)
165.	AS Attignat (10)	2–0	Olympique Belleroche Villefranche (8)
166.	ES Foissiat-Étrez (9)	0–1	AS Montchat Lyon (7)
167.	Côtière Meximieux Villieu (11)	4–0	FC Mas-Rillier (11)
168.	AS Genay (11)	1–8	Vénissieux FC (7)
169.	Beaujolais Football (10)	2–3	FC Reneins Vauxonne (10)
170.	FC des Collines (11)	0–6	AS Chavanay (7)
171.	FC Tignieu-Jameyzieu (11)	0–7	FC Charvieu-Chavagneux (8)
172.	FC Ternay (10)	0–4	FC Colombier-Satolas (8)
173.	FC Lyon Croix-Rousse (11)	1–4	US Montanay (10)
174.	Olympique Villefontaine (9)	2–4	FC Allobroges Asafia (8)
175.	US Est Lyonnais (9)	2–2 (8–7 p) (Note: Tie reversed from original draw.)	CS Nivolas-Vermelle (11)
176.	Muroise Foot (11)	5–1	FC Saint-Cyr Ampuis (12)
177.	Caluire SC (10)	3–0	Foot Trois Rivières (11)
178.	Olympic Sathonay Foot (11)	0–7	CS Viriat (8)
179.	US Formans (12)	0–4	Saône Mont d'Or FC (10)
180.	AC Rive-de-Gier (9)	0–0 (3–5 p)	AS Saint-Martin-en-Haut (8)
181.	FC Mont Brouilly (9)	0–0 (2–4 p)	FC Bressans (8)
182.	ÉS Liergues (9)	1–2	Stade Amplepuisien (7)
183.	US Cheminots Lyon Vaise (11)	0–9	ÉS Trinité Lyon (7)
184.	Savigny FC (10)	0–3	FC Franchevillois (11)
185.	Éveil de Lyon (10)	1–2	MOS Trois Rivières (7)
186.	ES Genas Azieu (9)	3–1	AL Saint-Maurice-l'Exil (8)
187.	Olympique Rillieux (9)	3–0	FC Varèze (8)
188.	US Loire-Saint-Romain (10)	1–4	AS Domarin (8)
189.	Rhône Sud FC (12)	0–4	CAS Cheminots Oullins Lyon (8)
190.	OS Beaujolais (11)	1–1 (4–2 p)	Belleville Football Beaujolais (10)
191.	AS Algerienne Villeurbanne (9)	1–3	Ménival FC (8)
192.	US Des Monts (11)	0–10	FC Chaponnay-Marennes (7)
193.	US Millery-Vourles (9)	0–0 (2–4 p)	CS Verpillière (8)
194.	RC Béligny (10)	1–3	US Feillens (7)
195.	US Ouest Lyonnais (11)	1–4	FC Gerland Lyon (9)
196.	Latino AFC Lyon (11)	0–6	AS Villeurbanne Éveil Lyonnais (8)
197.	AS Sornins Réunis (11)	1–5	FC Pontcharra-Saint-Loup (8)
198.	SC Maccabi Lyon (11)	0–5	SC Ouest Lyonnais (8)
199.	FC Denicé Arnas (10)	0–3	Domtac FC (7)
200.	Haute Brévenne Football (9)	0–0 (5–3 p)	CO Saint-Fons (9)
201.	Feyzin Club Belle Étoile (9)	3–4	CF Estrablin (8)
202.	Olympique Vaulx-en-Velin (9)	1–4	SO Pont-de-Chéruy-Chavanoz (8)
203.	FC Meys-Grézieu (10)	0–3	Sporting Nord-Isère (7)
204.	FC Virieu-Valondras (12)	1–4	OC Eybens (8)
205.	ES Cormoranche (12)	0–6	ES Bressane Marboz (7)
206.	FC Turc Virieu (13)	2–4	US Plaine de l'Ain (11)
207.	FC Pays de l'Arbresle (9)	1–2	Sud Lyonnais Foot (7)
208.	Jassans-Frans Foot (9)	1–0	FC Lyon (7)
209.	AS La Bridoire (13)	3–5	US Creys-Morestel (10)
210.	US Dolomoise (10)	0–4	FC La Sure (11)
211.	US Cassolards Passageois (12)	3–3 (6–7 p)	US Ruy Montceau (10)
212.	Entente Val d'Hyères (9)	3–0	AS Tullins-Fures (10)
213.	AS Grésivaudan (12)	2–2 (2–4 p)	US Corbelin (11)
214.	Rives SF (10)	3–1	AS Vézeronce-Huert (9)
215.	Challes SF (11)	0–1	Cœur de Savoie (10)
216.	ES Lanfonnet (11)	2–5	ES Tarentaise (8)
217.	AS Cuines-La Chambre Val d'Arc (10)	1–5	ES Drumettaz-Mouxy (8)
218.	FC Laissaud (10)	1–1 (6–7 p)	JS Chambéry (7)
219.	FC Cluses (10)	4–0	US Divonne (8)
220.	ES Thyez (10)	3–1	CS La Balme-de-Sillingy (10)
221.	AS Portugais Faverges (11)	6–1	SC Morzine Vallée d'Aulps (10)
222.	AS Thonon (11)	2–7	FC Ballaison (9)
223.	US Vougy (13)	4–6	CS Veigy-Foncenex (11)
224.	AS Le Lyaud-Armoy (10)	0–0 (2–3 p)	ES Chilly (7)
225.	US Mont Blanc (9)	2–0	JS Reignier (9)
226.	ES Fillinges (10)	5–3	US Pers-Jussy (11)
227.	AS Prévessin-Moëns (11)	4–1	FC Cruseilles (9)
228.	US Annemasse-Ambilly-Gaillard (9)	2–1	CS Amphion Publier (8)
229.	Échenevex-Ségny-Chevry Olympique (10)	0–5	US Annecy-le-Vieux (7)
230.	ES Douvaine-Loisin (10)	5–1	ES Amancy (10)
231.	FC Villy-le-Pelloux (12)	0–8	ASC Sallanches (8)
232.	CS Saint-Pierre (10)	5–0	FC La Filière (10)
233.	CSA Poisy (10)	3–8	FC Foron (7)
234.	AG Bons-en-Chablais (9)	1–4	US Pringy (8)
235.	AS Évires (11)	0–6	SS Allinges (8)
236.	FC La Rochette (12)	0–6	US Semnoz-Vieugy (8)
237.	US Grand Mont La Bâthie (11)	3–0	CA Yennne (11)
238.	EF Chautagne (10)	2–2 (3–4 p)	AS Sillingy (8)
239.	FC des Bauges (11)	1–3	UO Albertville (9)
240.	USC Aiguebelle (10)	1–1 (2–4 p)	US Modane (10)
241.	FC Chéran (11)	1–1 (5–4 p)	CO Chavanod (10)
242.	AJ Ville-la-Grand (11)	2–5	FC Chambotte (7)
243.	FC Cranves-Sales (11)	3–3 (3–2 p)	AS Épagny-Metz-Tessy (12)
244.	FC Thônes (10)	1–1 (3–5 p)	AS Parmelan Villaz (11)
245.	FC Frangy (11)	2–1	US Nantua (10)
246.	Valserhône FC (9)	3–1	AS Izernore Nurieux-Volognat (10)
247.	US La Ravoire (10)	1–1 (5–4 p)	US Chartreuse Guiers (8)
248.	AS Novalaise (11)	1–10	US Motteraine (8)
249.	FC Villargondran (11)	2–2 (9–8 p)	Nivolet FC (8)
250.	CA Maurienne (9)	0–3	Montmélian AF (8)
251.	ES Valleiry (10)	1–2	AS Travailleurs Turcs Oyonnax (9)
252.	ES Revermontoise (9)	4–0	US Arbent Marchon (10)

=== Third round ===
These matches were played on 16, 17, with one postponed until 24 September 2023.

Third Round Results: Auvergne-Rhône-Alpes
Tie no	Home team (Tier)	Score	Away team (Tier)
1.	FC Moussages (10)	1–5	US Vallée de l'Authre (7)
2.	Sud Cantal Foot (9)	0–0 (1–3 p)	Aurillac FC (6)
3.	Jordanne FC (10)	1–3	FC Massiac-Molompize-Blesle (8)
4.	Association Vergongheon-Arvant (7)	1–5	FC Espaly (5)
5.	SC Langogne (8)	1–4	AS Saint-Jacques (6)
6.	US Saint-Flour (6)	3–0	Sporting Chataigneraie Cantal (6)
7.	FC Junhac-Montsalvy (9)	1–1 (4–3 p)	US Crandelles (9)
8.	La Chapelle/Saint-Poncy FC (11)	1–2	AS Espinat (9)
9.	Entente Nord Lozère (7)	0–0 (8–9 p)	US Brioude (7)
10.	Parlan-Le Rouget FC (8)	3–1	EFC Saint-Amant-Tallende (8)
11.	Aulnat Sportif (10)	3–1	FC Ally Mauriac (8)
12.	US Fontannoise (8)	5–2	AS Sansacoise (9)
13.	AS Pleaux-Rilhac-Barriac (10)	0–2	Dômes-Sancy Foot (8)
14.	Entente Vallée de la Dordogne (10)	1–2	JS Saint-Priest-des-Champs (9)
15.	US Beauregard-Vendon (12)	1–4	US Saint-Beauzire (8)
16.	Lempdes Sport (7)	0–1	FC Riom (6)
17.	Cébazat Sports (8)	2–3	FC Mezel (9)
18.	Stade Saint-Yorre (8)	3–0 (Note: Tie reversed from original draw.)	AS Cellule (10)
19.	US Mozac (7)	1–1 (3–2 p)	CS Pont-du-Château (8)
20.	US Issoire (7)	1–6	Moulins Yzeure Foot (5)
21.	FC Martres-Lussat (8)	0–10	CS Volvic (6)
22.	US Ennezat (8)	1–1 (4–5 p)	US Bassin Minier (9)
23.	FC Cournon-d'Auvergne (7)	0–2	SA Thiers (6)
24.	US Lusigny (11)	1–2	US Vic-le-Comte (8)
25.	US Saint-Gervaisienne (10)	0–3	US Beaumontoise (6)
26.	AS Val de Sioule (10)	3–4	Clermont Ouvoimoja (9)
27.	AS Laussonne (10)	1–4	Ambert Livradois Sud (8)
28.	Olympic Saint-Julien-Chapteuil (8)	1–2	FC Aurec (9)
29.	RC Vichy (6)	0–4	FC Limonest Dardilly Saint-Didier (5)
30.	US Busset (12)	0–4	US Blavozy (6)
31.	AS Chadrac (8)	1–2	Seauve Sports (9)
32.	US Sucs et Lignon (7)	3–3 (7–6 p)	SCA Cussét (8)
33.	Sauveteurs Brivois (7)	0–5	US Monistrol (6)
34.	GS Dervaux Chambon-Feugerolles (9)	2–3	Velay FC (6)
35.	US Trezelles (10)	0–4	Hauts Lyonnais (5)
36.	AS Tronget (10)	2–4	AS Saint-Didier-Saint-Just (8)
37.	US Montfaucon Montregard Raucoules (11)	0–3	US Villars (8)
38.	AS Pertuis (10)	0–8	L'Étrat-La Tour Sportif (7)
39.	Bourbon Sportif (8)	1–4	AS Moulins (6)
40.	FC Châtel-Guyon (7)	0–2	AS Domérat (6)
41.	Espoir Molinetois (11)	2–3	Espérance Ceyratois Football (7)
42.	FC Haut d'Allier (10)	1–2	Roannais Foot 42 (7)
43.	AS Cheminots Saint-Germain (8)	1–2	AS Saint-Genès-Champanelle (7)
44.	US Lignerolles-Lavault Sainte-Anne Prémilhat (8)	1–0	Commentry FC (8)
45.	AC Creuzier-le-Vieux (8)	0–3	Montluçon Football (6)
46.	SC Avermes (9)	0–7	US Feurs (5)
47.	Bézenet-Doyet Foot (8)	0–0 (5–4 p)	CS Vaux-Estivareilles (9)
48.	US Coeur Allier (10)	3–1	AS Louchy (9)
49.	US Biachette Désertines (10)	1–4	AA Lapalisse (6)
50.	US Chevagnes (10)	0–1	US Vendat Bellerive Brugheas (8)
51.	US Drôme Provence (11)	1–2	FC Rochegudien (11)
52.	Olympique Centre Ardèche (9)	5–4	Espérance Hostunoise (9)
53.	AS Saint-Barthélemy-Grozon (12)	0–8	Sud Lyonnais Foot (7)
54.	US Bas-Vivarais (10)	2–6	AC Seyssinet (6)
55.	Olympique Salaise Rhodia (6)	0–1	Olympique de Valence (5)
56.	Valence FC (8)	1–0	UMS Montélimar (8)
57.	AS Saint-Martin-en-Haut (8)	3–1	US Mours (9)
58.	US Ancône (11)	0–8	Entente Crest-Aouste (7)
59.	ES Le Laris-Montchenu (13)	0–7	AS Véore Montoison (8)
60.	AF Ceven (12)	0–7	AS Sud Ardèche (7)
61.	Diois FC (10)	3–2	CO Donzère (10)
62.	JS Livron (12)	1–2	Vallis Auréa Foot (11)
63.	FC Péageois (8)	2–2 (5–4 p)	CF Estrablin (8)
64.	SC Ouest Lyonnais (8)	0–2	US Davézieux-Vidalon (9)
65.	AS La Sanne (11)	0–5	FC Échirolles (6)
66.	Entente Sarras Sports Saint-Vallier (9)	2–4	Lyon La Duchère (5)
67.	US Montélier (11)	0–10	AS Chavanay (7)
68.	FC Larnage-Serves (12)	2–3	FC Hauterives/US Grand Serre (10)
69.	RC Tournon-Tain (11)	0–4	FC Rhône Vallées (6)
70.	CO Châteauneuf-du-Rhône (12)	1–0	US Vallée du Jabron (10)
71.	Sporting Nord-Isère (7)	2–2 (1–4 p)	Ménival FC (8)
72.	ES Saint-Christo-Marcenod (9)	1–0	ES Beaumonteleger (9)
73.	MOS Trois Rivières (7)	6–0	AS Donatienne (8)
74.	RC Mauves (10)	1–0	AS Valensolles (11)
75.	SC Romans (13)	0–2	Côte Chaude Sportif (7)
76.	FCI Saint-Romain-le-Puy (10)	1–1 (3–4 p)	AS Villeurbanne Éveil Lyonnais (8)
77.	FC Saint-Martin-la-Sauveté (11)	0–3	Rhône Crussol Foot 07 (8)
78.	USG La Fouillouse (10)	0–3	FC Vaulx-en-Velin (5)
79.	OS Beaujolais (11)	5–4	US L'Horme (9)
80.	CO La Rivière (10)	3–2	Haut Pilat Interfoot (9)
81.	FC Franchevillois (11)	2–3	FC Saint-Étienne (9)
82.	AS Algérienne Chambon-Feugerolles (8)	1–1 (3–4 p)	Olympique Saint-Marcellin (7)
83.	Union Nord Iséroise Foot (11)	2–2 (6–5 p)	FC Pontcharra-Saint-Loup (8)
84.	Olympique du Montcel (11)	0–11	Chassieu Décines FC (5)
85.	FC Reneins Vauxonne (10)	2–3	OC Ondaine (11)
86.	Saône Mont d'Or FC (10)	0–3	Sorbiers-La Talaudière (9)
87.	US Villerest (11)	1–4	AS Montchat Lyon (7)
88.	AS Cornas (10)	0–1	FC Saint-Paul-en-Jarez (8)
89.	AF Pays de Coise (8)	0–2	US Saint-Galmier-Chambœuf (8)
90.	AS Saint-Just-Saint-Rambert (9)	7–1	ES Manival (7)
91.	walkover (Note: FC Côtière-Luenaz and UGA Lyon-Décines both disqualified from second round match 157)	–	Domtac FC (7)
92.	AS La Chaumière (12)	1–8	Saint-Chamond Foot (7)
93.	Haute Brévenne Football (9)	0–1	AS Misérieux-Trévoux (6)
94.	FC Genilac (12)	0–5	Stade Amplepuisien (7)
95.	FC Bressans (8)	0–4	ES Genas Azieu (9)
96.	US Jarrie-Champ (10)	0–3	FC Plaine Tonique (8)
97.	AS Saint-Priest (5))	8–1	US Saint-Geoire-en-Valdaine (12
98.	US Thodure (11)	2–4	FC Gerland Lyon (9)
99.	US Corbelin (11)	2–3	FCO Firminy-Insersport (7)
100.	US Sassenage (10)	0–1	FC Roche-Saint-Genest (7)
101.	Olympique Saint-Genis-Laval (6)	1–1 (5–3 p)	AS Savigneux-Montbrison (7)
102.	Caluire SC (10)	1–4	CAS Cheminots Oullins Lyon (8)
103.	US Ruy Montceau (10)	0–2	CS Neuville (6)
104.	Muroise Foot (11)	1–1 (5–3 p)	CS Verpillière (8)
105.	Saint-Quentin-Fallavier FC (10)	1–3	Olympique Le Coteau (10)
106.	FC Lauzes (11)	2–0	Olympique Rillieux (9)
107.	AS Portugaise Vaulx-en-Velin (11)	0–4	CS Meginand (9)
108.	AS Travailleurs Turcs Oyonnax (9)	0–2	CS Lagnieu (8)
109.	FC Veyle Sâone (8)	0–1	ES Bressane Marboz (7)
110.	Côtière Meximieux Villieu (11)	3–1	ES Revermontoise (9)
111.	Deux Rochers FC (11)	1–4	Jassans-Frans Foot (9)
112.	US Plaine de l'Ain (11)	0–2	FC Colombier-Satolas (8)
113.	US Gières (9)	2–1	US Est Lyonnais (9)
114.	Vénissieux FC (7)	0–6	Ain Sud (5)
115.	FC Seyssins (9)	1–1 (5–4 p)	FC Saint-Cyr Collonges au Mont d'Or (6)
116.	CS Voreppe (10)	0–2	ÉS Trinité Lyon (7)
117.	AS Attignat (10)	1–0 (Note: Match abandoned after 87 minutes, after Saint-Martin-d'Hères FC left the field. AS Attignat qualify.)	Saint-Martin-d'Hères FC (10)
118.	ACC Franco Turc Bourg-en-Bresse (12)	1–1 (2–4 p)	Olympique Sud Revermont 01 (10)
119.	AS Crossey (11)	0–5	FC Charvieu-Chavagneux (8)
120.	US Montanay (10)	1–4	AS Craponne (7)
121.	Bourg Sud (9)	1–2	Olympique Nord Dauphiné (10)
122.	AS Domarin (8)	6–1	SO Pont-de-Chéruy-Chavanoz (8)
123.	US Modane (10)	2–6	Montmélian AF (8)
124.	FC Villargondran (11)	4–2	US La Ravoire (10)
125.	FC La Sure (11)	0–8	FC Chaponnay-Marennes (7)
126.	US Creys-Morestel (10)	1–5	AS Portugais Faverges (11)
127.	ES Rachais (8)	0–1	CS Viriat (8)
128.	Entente Val d'Hyères (9)	2–2 (4–5 p)	FC La Tour-Saint-Clair (6)
129.	FC Allobroges Asafia (8)	4–0	ES Tarentaise (8)
130.	US Motteraine (8)	1–1 (4–5 p)	US Feillens (7)
131.	UO Albertville (9)	0–4	US Pringy (8)
132.	Rives SF (10)	1–3	JS Chambéry (7)
133.	FC Frangy (11)	1–1 (3–5 p)	Football Côte Saint-André (8)
134.	RC Bouvesse (11)	0–7	Chambéry SF (5)
135.	OC Eybens (8)	3–0	FC Chambotte (7)
136.	US Semnoz-Vieugy (8)	2–1	FC Vallée de la Gresse (8)
137.	AS Parmelan Villaz (11)	2–3	FC Cranves-Sales (11)
138.	FC Ballaison (9)	1–1 (4–5 p)	ES Douvaine-Loisin (10)
139.	AS Sillingy (8)	1–2	Oyonnax Plastics Vallée FC (7)
140.	CS Saint-Pierre (10)	1–3	ASC Sallanches (8)
141.	Cœur de Savoie (10)	0–1	Cluses-Scionzier FC (6)
142.	FC Foron (7)	5–0	AS Montréal-la-Cluse (8)
143.	ES Drumettaz-Mouxy (8)	1–3	Aix-les-Bains FC (6)
144.	Valserhône FC (9)	1–1 (7–8 p)	US Annemasse-Ambilly-Gaillard (9)
145.	CS Veigy-Foncenex (11)	1–0	SS Allinges (8)
146.	FC Chéran (11)	0–3	ES Chilly (7)
147.	AS Prévessin-Moëns (11)	0–6	US Annecy-le-Vieux (7)
148.	US Mont Blanc (9)	0–1	FC Cluses (10)
149.	ES Fillinges (10)	0–6	GFA Rumilly-Vallières (5)
150.	US Grand Mont La Bâthie (11)	1–1 (7–8 p)	ES Thyez (10)

=== Fourth round ===
These matches were played on 30 September and 1 October 2023.

Fourth Round Results: Auvergne-Rhône-Alpes
Tie no	Home team (Tier)	Score	Away team (Tier)
1.	US Saint-Beauzire (8)	0–1	US Bassin Minier (9)
2.	AS Saint-Jacques (6)	0–6	FC Espaly (5)
3.	US Blavozy (6)	0–1	CS Volvic (6)
4.	FC Massiac-Molompize-Blesle (8)	0–0 (3–5 p)	Aurillac FC (6)
5.	US Vic-le-Comte (8)	1–1 (3–5 p)	Parlan-Le Rouget FC (8)
6.	AS Saint-Genès-Champanelle (7)	3–1	US Fontannoise (8)
7.	FC Junhac-Montsalvy (9)	1–1 (4–2 p)	US Vallée de l'Authre (7)
8.	Espérance Ceyratois Football (7)	0–0 (5–4 p)	FC Chamalières (4)
9.	Dômes-Sancy Foot (8)	2–4	Velay FC (6)
10.	Aulnat Sportif (10)	1–1 (4–2 p)	US Beaumontoise (6)
11.	Moulins Yzeure Foot (5)	6–0	US Saint-Flour (6)
12.	AS Espinat (9)	1–2	FC Mezel (9)
13.	Bézenet-Doyet Foot (8)	1–2	AS Domérat (6)
14.	AS Moulins (6)	1–1 (2–4 p)	US Sucs et Lignon (7)
15.	AS Saint-Didier-Saint-Just (8)	1–0	Clermont Ouvoimoja (9)
16.	FC Riom (6)	4–4 (6–7 p)	FC Roche-Saint-Genest (7)
17.	US Brioude (7)	1–1 (2–3 p)	FCO Firminy-Insersport (7)
18.	AA Lapalisse (6)	1–1 (3–1 p)	Montluçon Football (6)
19.	FC Aurec (9)	0–19	Le Puy Foot 43 Auvergne (4)
20.	Stade Saint-Yorre (8)	0–1	US Mozac (7)
21.	Seauve Sports (9)	0–1	Ambert Livradois Sud (8)
22.	US Vendat Bellerive Brugheas (8)	1–3	Hauts Lyonnais (5)
23.	JS Saint-Priest-des-Champs (9)	1–2	US Coeur Allier (10)
24.	US Monistrol (6)	3–0	SA Thiers (6)
25.	US Lignerolles-Lavault Sainte-Anne Prémilhat (8)	0–3	US Feurs (5)
26.	Olympique Nord Dauphiné (10)	0–5	Ménival FC (8)
27.	ES Bressane Marboz (7)	1–3	Lyon La Duchère (5)
28.	CS Lagnieu (8)	1–1 (3–4 p)	Ain Sud (5)
29.	AC Seyssinet(6)	3–0	L'Étrat-La Tour Sportif (7)
30.	Côtière Meximieux Villieu (11)	0–6	Football Bourg-en-Bresse Péronnas 01 (4)
31.	Olympique Sud Revermont 01 (10)	0–2	Oyonnax Plastics Vallée FC (7)
32.	Muroise Foot (11)	1–4	ÉS Trinité Lyon (7)
33.	CS Viriat (8)	2–0	FC Charvieu-Chavagneux (8)
34.	CS Meginand (9)	0–1	AS Saint-Just-Saint-Rambert (9)
35.	AS Misérieux-Trévoux (6)	3–2	AS Craponne (7)
36.	OS Beaujolais (11)	1–6	FC Plaine Tonique (8)
37.	ES Genas Azieu (9)	5–2	US Feillens (7)
38.	FC Gerland Lyon (9)	0–0 (4–2 p) (Note: FC Gerland Lyon penalised for fielding an ineligible player, CS Neuville qualify.)	CS Neuville (6)
39.	Jassans-Frans Foot (9)	1–4	FC Colombier-Satolas (8)
40.	CO Châteauneuf-du-Rhône (12)	0–3	Domtac FC (7)
41.	CAS Cheminots Oullins Lyon (8)	1–2	Olympique Centre Ardèche (9)
42.	FC Lauzes (11)	1–2	FC Saint-Étienne (9)
43.	OC Ondaine (11)	0–6	AS Montchat Lyon (7)
44.	Roannais Foot 42 (7)	4–2	AS Saint-Martin-en-Haut (8)
45.	ES Saint-Christo-Marcenod (9)	2–0	Olympique Saint-Genis-Laval (6)
46.	Sorbiers-La Talaudière (9)	0–1	US Saint-Galmier-Chambœuf (8)
47.	AS Villeurbanne Éveil Lyonnais (8)	0–2	Andrézieux-Bouthéon FC (4)
48.	Union Nord Iséroise Foot (11)	3–3 (2–3 p)	Stade Amplepuisien (7)
49.	Olympique Le Coteau (10)	5–1	FC Hauterives/US Grand Serre (10)
50.	AS Chavanay (7)	1–3	FC Vaulx-en-Velin (5)
51.	US Villars (8)	0–2	FC Limonest Dardilly Saint-Didier (5)
52.	CO La Rivière (10)	2–4	FC La Tour-Saint-Clair (6)
53.	RC Mauves (10)	1–2	AS Saint-Priest (5)
54.	US Gières (9)	0–1	Côte Chaude Sportif (7)
55.	AS Domarin (8)	1–3	FC Rhône Vallées (6)
56.	Entente Crest-Aouste (7)	2–0	AS Sud Ardèche (7)
57.	US Davézieux-Vidalon (9)	2–2 (4–5 p)	MOS Trois Rivières (7)
58.	Olympique de Valence (5)	0–3	Chassieu Décines FC (5)
59.	FC Rochegudien (11)	2–4	FC Allobroges Asafia (8)
60.	Saint-Chamond Foot (7)	5–1	AS Véore Montoison (8)
61.	Vallis Auréa Foot (11)	1–1 (3–1 p)	Rhône Crussol Foot 07 (8)
62.	FC Saint-Paul-en-Jarez (8)	4–1	FC Échirolles (6)
63.	Olympique Saint-Marcellin (7)	0–2	FC Bourgoin-Jallieu (4)
64.	FC Péageois (8)	0–0 (5–4 p)	Valence FC (8)
65.	FC Seyssins (9)	5–0	Diois FC (10)
66.	FC Villargondran (11)	1–1 (4–3 p)	ASC Sallanches (8)
67.	JS Chambéry (7)	2–0	Aix-les-Bains FC (6)
68.	FC Cranves-Sales (11)	2–2 (9–8 p)	US Semnoz-Vieugy (8)
69.	ES Chilly (7)	0–2	Thonon Evian Grand Genève FC (4)
70.	AS Portugais Faverges (11)	1–10	Chambéry SF (5)
71.	ES Douvaine-Loisin (10)	1–3	OC Eybens (8)
72.	ES Thyez (10)	1–3	FC Foron (7)
73.	US Pringy (8)	4–3	FC Cluses (10)
74.	US Annemasse-Ambilly-Gaillard (9)	2–6	FC Chaponnay-Marennes (7)
75.	AS Attignat (10)	2–2 (5–4 p)	Sud Lyonnais Foot (7)
76.	Montmélian AF (8)	1–4	US Annecy-le-Vieux (7)
77.	CS Veigy-Foncenex (11)	1–4	Cluses-Scionzier FC (6)
78.	Football Côte Saint-André (8)	1–8	GFA Rumilly-Vallières (5)

=== Fifth round ===
These matches were played on 14 and 15 October 2023.

Fifth Round Results: Auvergne-Rhône-Alpes
Tie no	Home team (Tier)	Score	Away team (Tier)
1.	Velay FC (6)	3–2	US Sucs et Lignon (7)
2.	AS Domérat (6)	2–1	AA Lapalisse (6)
3.	US Feurs (5)	2–0	Moulins Yzeure Foot (5)
4.	Parlan-Le Rouget FC (8)	1–1 (4–5 p)	Aurillac FC (6)
5.	FCO Firminy-Insersport (7)	0–4	Hauts Lyonnais (5)
6.	FC Mezel (9)	0–1	FC Espaly (5)
7.	FC Junhac-Montsalvy (9)	1–2	CS Volvic (6)
8.	US Bassin Minier (9)	1–3	AS Saint-Genès-Champanelle (7)
9.	Espérance Ceyratois Football (7)	0–4	Andrézieux-Bouthéon FC (4)
10.	Ambert Livradois Sud (8)	1–1 (7–6 p)	AS Saint-Didier-Saint-Just (8)
11.	US Mozac (7)	0–0 (4–3 p)	US Monistrol (6)
12.	Aulnat Sportif (10)	0–9	Le Puy Foot 43 Auvergne (4)
13.	US Coeur Allier (10)	0–3	FC Roche-Saint-Genest (7)
14.	Olympique Le Coteau (10)	0–3	AS Misérieux-Trévoux (6)
15.	Vallis Auréa Foot (11)	0–1	Saint-Chamond Foot (7)
16.	Lyon La Duchère (5)	1–1 (6–5 p)	GOAL FC (3)
17.	US Saint-Galmier-Chambœuf (8)	2–1	AS Saint-Just-Saint-Rambert (9)
18.	FC Saint-Étienne (9)	0–2	FC Chaponnay-Marennes (7)
19.	FC Saint-Paul-en-Jarez (8)	1–2	FC Vaulx-en-Velin (5)
20.	AS Montchat Lyon (7)	4–1	JS Chambéry (7)
21.	ES Genas Azieu (9)	0–3	Roannais Foot 42 (7)
22.	FC Plaine Tonique (8)	2–1	Entente Crest-Aouste (7)
23.	ES Saint-Christo-Marcenod (9)	2–3	FC Limonest Dardilly Saint-Didier (5)
24.	Ménival FC (8)	0–1	FC Péageois (8)
25.	Domtac FC (7)	0–2	Chassieu Décines FC (5)
26.	Côte Chaude Sportif (7)	0–5	CS Neuville (6)
27.	Stade Amplepuisien (7)	0–8	FC Bourgoin-Jallieu (4)
28.	FC Cranves-Sales (11)	0–10	AS Saint-Priest (5)
29.	FC Foron (7)	2–3	Football Bourg-en-Bresse Péronnas 01 (4)
30.	ÉS Trinité Lyon (7)	1–6	FC Rhône Vallées (6)
31.	Olympique Centre Ardèche (9)	0–2	Chambéry SF (5)
32.	CS Viriat (8)	2–2 (4–1 p)	Cluses-Scionzier FC (6)
33.	FC Villargondran (11)	0–4	FC Seyssins (9)
34.	US Annecy-le-Vieux (7)	1–1 (4–3 p)	FC Allobroges Asafia (8)
35.	AS Attignat (10)	0–1	Oyonnax Plastics Vallée FC (7)
36.	FC La Tour-Saint-Clair (6)	0–5	FC Villefranche Beaujolais (3)
37.	MOS Trois Rivières (7)	0–2	GFA Rumilly-Vallières (5)
38.	FC Colombier-Satolas (8)	0–3	Ain Sud (5)
39.	AC Seyssinet(6)	0–1	Thonon Evian Grand Genève FC (4)
40.	OC Eybens (8)	3–1	US Pringy (8)

=== Sixth round ===
These matches were played on 28 and 29 October 2023.

Sixth Round Results: Auvergne-Rhône-Alpes
Tie no	Home team (Tier)	Score	Away team (Tier)
1.	Ambert Livradois Sud (8)	0–2	Velay FC (6)
2.	US Saint-Galmier-Chambœuf (8)	1–2	FC Limonest Dardilly Saint-Didier (5)
3.	Roannais Foot 42 (7)	3–0	CS Viriat (8)
4.	FC Vaulx-en-Velin (5)	1–2	US Feurs (5)
5.	Le Puy Foot 43 Auvergne (4)	3–0	Chassieu Décines FC (5)
6.	AS Domérat (6)	1–1 (5–4 p)	Andrézieux-Bouthéon FC (4)
7.	Aurillac FC (6)	0–0 (4–5 p)	FC Roche-Saint-Genest (7)
8.	US Mozac (7)	0–2	FC Villefranche Beaujolais (3)
9.	Saint-Chamond Foot (7)	1–2	CS Volvic (6)
10.	AS Saint-Genès-Champanelle (7)	1–5	FC Espaly (5)
11.	FC Plaine Tonique (8)	0–5	Football Bourg-en-Bresse Péronnas 01 (4)
12.	Oyonnax Plastics Vallée FC (7)	1–7	AS Saint-Priest (5)
13.	GFA Rumilly-Vallières (5)	1–1 (3–4 p)	Lyon La Duchère (5)
14.	OC Eybens (8)	0–2	FC Bourgoin-Jallieu (4)
15.	CS Neuville (6)	3–1	Ain Sud (5)
16.	FC Péageois (8)	1–5	Thonon Evian Grand Genève FC (4)
17.	FC Chaponnay-Marennes (7)	3–1	US Annecy-le-Vieux (7)
18.	AS Misérieux-Trévoux (6)	1–1 (7–8 p)	Chambéry SF (5)
19.	FC Seyssins (9)	1–1 (4–2 p)	AS Montchat Lyon (7)
20.	Hauts Lyonnais (5)	2–1	FC Rhône Vallées (6)
