= Adjaratou Abdoulaye =

Togolese politician

Member of the Pan-African Parliament
- In office 2009–2014

Member of the National Assembly of Togo
- Incumbent
- Assumed office 2007

Personal details
- Party: Rally of the Togolese People

Adjaratou Abdoulaye is a Togolese politician and a member of the Pan-African Parliament from Togo, who was elected to the National Assembly of Togo in the 2007 parliamentary election, representing the Rally of the Togolese People. She was elected to the Pan-African Parliament from 2009 to 2014.
