= Juan Lombardi =

Uruguayan footballer (1965–2021)

Personal information
- Full name: Juan José Lombardi Álvez
- Date of birth: 21 August 1965
- Place of birth: Montevideo, Uruguay
- Date of death: 28 August 2021 (aged 56)
- Place of death: Santiago, Chile
- Position: Midfielder

Youth career
- CLMC FC

Senior career*
Years	Team	Apps	(Gls)
1984–1991	Danubio		
1992–1993	Rentistas		
1993–1995	Provincial Osorno	47	(4)
1995–1996	Deportes Melipilla	38	(5)
- * Club domestic league appearances and goals

Juan José Lombardi Álvez (21 August 1965 – 28 August 2021) was a Uruguayan footballer who played as a midfielder for clubs of Uruguay and Chile.

== Career ==
- (Uruguay) Danubio 1984–1991
- (Uruguay) Rentistas 1992–1993
- (Chile) Provincial Osorno 1993–1995
- (Chile) Deportes Melipilla 1995–1996

== Personal life ==
Lombardi made his home in Santiago, Chile. He died on 28 August 2021.
