= Abdoulaye Sekou Sampil =

Senegalese-French footballer (born 1984)

Sekou Sampil
Personal information
- Full name: Abdoulaye Sekou Sampil
- Date of birth: 9 December 1984 (age 41)
- Place of birth: Dakar, Senegal
- Position: Striker

Team information
- Current team: KFC Dessel Sport
- Number: 19

Youth career
- –2001: US Lusitanos Saint-Maur
- 2001–2002: Carpi
- 2002–2003: Sochaux
- 2003–2004: Châteauroux

Senior career*
Years	Team	Apps	(Gls)
2004–2005	Carpi	21	(2)
2005–2007	Oudenaarde	39	(17)
2007–2008	Cappellen	30	(18)
2008–2009	FC Eindhoven	6	(0)
2009–2010	Beveren	31	(7)
2009–2010	RS Waasland-Beveren	1	(0)
2011–	Dessel	2	(0)
- * Club domestic league appearances and goals

Abdoulaye Sekou Sampil (born 9 December 1984) is a French professional footballer who plays for KFC Dessel Sport.

== Career ==
He formerly played in Belgium for Cappellen and in the Netherlands for FC Eindhoven.
