= Terence Mophuting =

Motswana footballer

Personal information
- Date of birth: 11 November 1965
- Place of birth: Botswana
- Date of death: 1 December 2008 (aged 43)
- Place of death: Jwaneng, Botswana
- Position: Defender

Senior career*
Years	Team	Apps	(Gls)
1984–1988	Gaborone United	96	(15)
1989–1990	Kaizer Chiefs	17	(1)
1990	Qwa Qwa Stars (loan)	32	(5)
1992–1995	Lobatse Gunners	81	(20)
1996–2001	Notwane FC	155	(24)
Total		381	(65)

International career
1992–2000	Botswana		
- * Club domestic league appearances and goals

Terence Mophuting (1965–2008) was a Motswana footballer. A defender, he played for the Botswana national football team between 1992 and 2000.
