= Abdoulaye Mar Dieye =

Senegalese public servant

- Occupations: Economist and public servant
- Known for: Serving as United Nations Secretary-General António Guterres

Abdoulaye Mar Dieye is a Senegalese economist and public servant who has been serving as United Nations Secretary-General António Guterres' Special Coordinator for development in the Sahel since 2021. He previously held various positions within the United Nations Development Programme (UNDP).

== Early life and education ==
Dieye obtained his degree from the École Nationale de la Statistique et de l’Administration Économique of the Institut national de la statistique et des études économiques in Paris. He has a master's degree in development studies from the International Institute of Social Studies (ISS) in The Hague.

== Career ==
Dieye held a number of high-ranking positions with the Government of Senegal prior to joining the United Nations, including Chief of the General Planning Division in the Ministry of Planning and Cooperation.

Upon joining the UN, Dieye held a number of senior positions within UNDP, including as Chief of Staff and Director of the Executive Office (2009-2013) and Deputy Assistant Administrator and Deputy Regional Director of the Regional Bureau for Arab States. He served as Deputy Special Representative of the Secretary-General for the United Nations Operations in Côte d'Ivoire (UNOCI) as well as United Nations Resident Coordinator, United Nations Designated Official for Security, Humanitarian Coordinator and UNDP Resident Representative in Abidjan. He also served as Chief Economist and Chief of Policy, and Country Director of Programmes and Operations for West Africa in UNDP.

From 2013 until 2018, Dieye served as UNDP's Assistant Administrator and Director of the Regional Bureau for Africa; he was appointed to this position by United Nations Secretary-General Ban Ki-moon on 16 July 2013. He subsequently held positions as Assistant Secretary-General of the United Nations to lead UNDP's Bureau for Policy and Programme Support (2018–2019) and as Special Adviser to the Administrator Achim Steiner (2019–2020).

== Other activities ==
- United Nations System Staff College (UNSSC), Member of the Board of Governors
