= Saint-Jeannet =

Saint-Jeannet is the name of 2 communes in France:

- Saint-Jeannet, Alpes-de-Haute-Provence, in the Alpes-de-Haute-Provence department
- Saint-Jeannet, Alpes-Maritimes, in the Alpes-Maritimes department
