= Grafton Holband =

Dutch footballer (born 1965)

Personal information
- Full name: Lionel Grafton Holband
- Date of birth: 25 February 1965 (age 61)
- Place of birth: Paramaribo, Suriname
- Position: Midfielder

Youth career
- GRC Groningen

Senior career*
Years	Team	Apps	(Gls)
1983–1985	GRC Groningen		
1985–1986	Jong Groningen		
1986–1988	GRC Groningen		
1988–1989	Hoogeveen		
1989–1994	Groningen	109	(6)
- * Club domestic league appearances and goals

Lionel Grafton Holband (born 25 February 1965) is a Dutch retired footballer who played as a midfielder for Eredivisie league club Groningen between 1989 and 1994.

== Career ==
Lionel Grafton Holband was born on 25 February 1975 in Paramaribo, Suriname. During his childhood, he moved with his family from the newly independent Suriname to Groningen in the Netherlands, and became a Dutch citizen in 1983.

At a young age, Holband moved from GRC to FC Groningen. After a year, he was released and returned to GRC, which was subsequently relegated from the Hoofdklasse. Holband then spent two years playing in Hoogeveen. Reflecting on his return to Groningen, he remarked in February 1990, "Koeman came by last season and said, 'What's done is done.' I was surprised that Groningen took me back, as it had only happened to Claus Boekweg before. But there's a difference: Claus returned as an amateur, while I returned as a professional. Have I improved over the years? I've mainly become mentally stronger."

During his tenure at Groningen, the team achieved some of its best-ever results in the Eredivisie, finishing third in the 1990–91 season. Hip osteoarthritis forced Holband to retire from professional football in 1994. However, he played one more season at the amateur level for Club Italiano while taking coaching courses.

After his playing career, Holband served as a youth coach at Groningen from 1994 to 2011. He left his position to focus on his job at the Groningen municipality. He later was an assistant coach at amateur side Pelikaan S from Oostwold.
