= David Kealy =

Irish footballer

Personal information
- Date of birth: 9 August 1965 (age 61)
- Place of birth: Dublin, Ireland
- Position: Forward

Youth career
- 1973–1985: Cambridge Boys

Senior career*
Years	Team	Apps	(Gls)
1985–1986	Bohemians	7	(1)
1986–1987	Drogheda United		
1987–1988	Bray Wanderers	7	(1)
1988–1989	Shamrock Rovers		
1990–1993	Bray Wanderers	38	(2)
1993–1996	Longford Town	53	(15)
- * Club domestic league appearances and goals

David Kealy (born 9 August 1965) was an Irish soccer player during the 1980s and 1990s.
