= Khabib Ilyaletdinov =

Russian footballer

Personal information
- Full name: Khabib Khasibovich Ilyaletdinov
- Date of birth: 1 January 1965 (age 61)
- Place of birth: Moscow, Russia
- Height: 1.72 m (5 ft 7 1/2 in)
- Position: Midfielder

Youth career
- 1982–1983: FC Torpedo Moscow

Senior career*
Years	Team	Apps	(Gls)
1983	FC FShM Moscow	22	(1)
1984–1986	FC SKA Khabarovsk	118	(5)
1987–1989	FC Lokomotiv Moscow	57	(2)
1990	FC Spartak Moscow	0	(0)
1991–1992	FC Rotor Volgograd	38	(0)
1993–1994	FC TRASKO Moscow	44	(7)
1997	FC Magnitka Magnitogorsk	25	(1)

Managerial career
- 2002: FC Krasnoznamensk (assistant)
- 2006–2008: FC Spartak Ruza (administrator)
- 2008–2010: FC Norilsk Nikel (assistant)
- 2010–2011: FC Saturn Moscow Oblast (analyst)
- 2013–2014: FC Spartak Ruza (administrator)
- * Club domestic league appearances and goals

Khabib Khasibovich Ilyaletdinov (Russian: Хабиб Хасибович Илялетдинов; born 1 January 1965) is a Russian former professional footballer.

== Club career ==
He made his professional debut in the Soviet First League in 1984 for FC SKA Khabarovsk.

== Honours ==
- Soviet Cup finalist: 1990 (played in the early stages of the 1989–90 tournament for FC Lokomotiv Moscow).
