= Josef Ringel =

Czech footballer

Personal information
- Date of birth: 25 January 1965 (age 61)
- Position: Defender

Senior career*
Years	Team	Apps	(Gls)
1985–1992	Spartak Hradec Králové		
1996–1998	AFK Atlantic Lázně Bohdaneč		
1998–1999	SK Chrudim		
1999–2001	SC Xaverov		
- * Club domestic league appearances and goals

Josef Ringel (born 25 January 1965) is a retired Czech football defender.
