= Abdoulaye Coulibaly (footballer, born 1988) =

Senegalese football player

Personal information
- Full name: Pape Abdoulaye Coulibaly
- Date of birth: 2 March 1988 (age 38)
- Place of birth: Tassinère, Senegal
- Height: 1.94 m (6 ft 4 in)
- Position: Goalkeeper

Team information
- Current team: US Feurs

Youth career
- ?–2006: Elite Foot de Dakar

Senior career*
Years	Team	Apps	(Gls)
2006–2013	Saint-Étienne B	134	(0)
2008–2013	Saint-Étienne	2	(0)
2013-2014	Galaxy Dakar		
2014–2017	Toulouse Rodéo	60	(0)
2019-2020	Hauts Lyonnais	10	(0)
2020-	US Feurs	17	(0)

International career
2008	Senegal	1	(0)
- * Club domestic league appearances and goals as of 23:37, 14 May 2019 (UTC)

Pape Abdoulaye Coulibaly (born 2 March 1988 in Tassinère) is a Senegalese football player, who currently plays for Feurs US. He plays as a goalkeeper.

== Career ==
Coulibaly started his career with Elite Foot de Dakar and joined in 2006 to AS Saint-Étienne, signing a professional contract 30 June 2011 in 2007.

== International ==
Coulibaly is a member of the Senegal national football team, he is third keeper in movement with Cheikh N'Diaye.
