= Abdoulaye Sogue =

Senegalese footballer

Personal information
- Full name: Abdoulaye Sogue
- Date of birth: July 5, 1965 (age 61)
- Place of birth: Tilmaka, Senegal
- Height: 1.80 m (5 ft 11 in)
- Position: Striker

Senior career*
Years	Team	Apps	(Gls)
1985–1986	Nancy	0	(0)
1986–1987	Épinal	7	(1)
1987–1991	Chaumont	83	(17)
1991–1992	Chamois Niortais	30	(15)
1992–1994	Charleville	61	(4)
- * Club domestic league appearances and goals

Abdoulaye Sogue (born July 5, 1965) is a Senegalese former professional footballer who played as a striker.
