= Abdoulaye Coulibaly (footballer, born 1976) =

Ivorian footballer

Dialla Coulibaly
Personal information
- Full name: Abdoulaye Coulibaly
- Date of birth: December 29, 1976 (age 49)
- Place of birth: Sirana, Ivory Coast
- Height: 1.79 m (5 ft 10 in)
- Position: Defender

Senior career*
Years	Team	Apps	(Gls)
2002–2004	Romorantin	73	(1)
2004–2005	Besançon	26	(0)
2005–2006	Clermont	14	(0)
2007–2008	Nîmes	29	(0)
2008–2010	Martigues		
2010–2011	Uzès Pont du Gard	24	(0)
- * Club domestic league appearances and goals as of 18 November 2011

Abdoulaye 'Dialla' Coulibaly (born 29 December 1976) is an Ivorian footballer, who plays as a defender. He also holds French nationality.
