= Christophe Jeannet =

French footballer (born 1965)

Personal information
- Full name: Christophe Jeannet
- Date of birth: September 22, 1965 (age 61)
- Place of birth: France
- Height: 1.85 m (6 ft 1 in)
- Position: Goalkeeper

Senior career*
Years	Team	Apps	(Gls)
1984–1986	Besançon	0	(0)
1986–1989	SO Cholet	?	(?)
1989–1994	Chamois Niortais	72	(0)
- * Club domestic league appearances and goals

Christophe Jeannet (born September 22, 1965 in France) is a former professional footballer who played as a goalkeeper.

== See also ==
- Football in France
- List of football clubs in France
