= US Feurs =

French football club

Feurs
- Full name: Union Sportive Forezienne
- Founded: 1945
- Ground: Stade Rousson, Feurs
- Capacity: 2000
- Chairman: Éric Cognet
- Manager: Bruno
- League: National 3 Group K
- 2022–23: National 3 Group M, 9th
Home colours

Union Sportive Forezienne is a French association football club founded in 1945. They are based in the town of Feurs and their home stadium is the Stade Rousson. As of the 2022–23 season, they play in Championnat National 3, the fifth tier of French football, after winning promotion in 2022.
