= Saint-Georges-du-Bois, Sarthe =

Administrative division in Pays de la Loire, France

Saint-Georges-du-Bois
- Commune
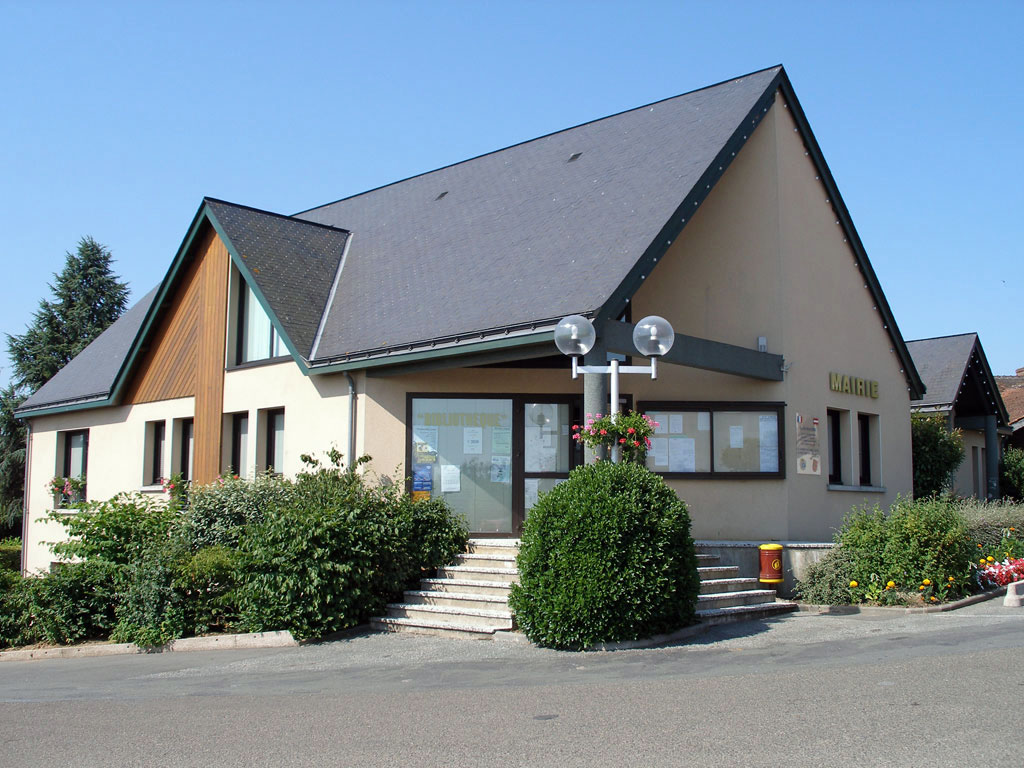
- City Offices of Saint-Georges-du-Bois

- Coat of arms
- Location of Saint-Georges-du-Bois
- Location within France Location within Pays de la Loire
- Coordinates: 47°58′30″N 0°06′05″E
- Country: France
- Region: Pays de la Loire
- Department: Sarthe
- Arrondissement: Le Mans
- Canton: Le Mans-7
- Intercommunality: Le Mans Métropole

Government
  - Mayor (2020–2026): Franck Breteau
- Area^{1}: 7.23 km^{2} (2.79 sq mi)
- Highest elevation: 102 m (335 ft)
- Lowest elevation: 48 m (157 ft)
- Population (2023): 2,285
  - Density: 316/km^{2} (819/sq mi)
- Demonym(s): Boisgeorgian, Boisgeorgiane
- Time zone: UTC+01:00 (CET)
  - Summer (DST): UTC+02:00 (CEST)
- INSEE/Postal code: 72280 /72700
- ^{1} French Land Register data, which excludes lakes, ponds, glaciers > 1 km^{2} (0.386 sq mi or 247 acres) and river estuaries.

Saint-Georges-du-Bois (French pronunciation: [sɛ̃ ʒɔʁʒ dy bwa]) is a commune, located in the department of Sarthe in Pays de la Loire region in northwestern France.

Located 8 kilometres (5.0 mi) southwest of Le Mans and 190 kilometres (120 mi) southwest of Paris as the crow flies or 55 minutes by train on TGV Atlantique. It is crossed by the county road 309 that connects Le Mans to Sablé-sur-Sarthe. A few kilometers away, the interchange Le Mans Sud on the highway A11 allows quick access to major cities in the west (Angers, Nantes, Tours or Rennes). The area only has one small stream, the Orne Champagne.

== Geography ==
=== Location ===
Located in the region of Pays de la Loire and the Department of Sarthe in the arrondissement of Le Mans and the canton of Le Mans-7 (since March 2015), Saint-Georges-du-Bois is located in the center of the department of Sarthe (47°58′23″N 0°6′0″E), 8 kilometres (5.0 mi) southwest of Le Mans and 190 kilometres (120 mi) southwest of Paris as the crow flies or 55 minutes by train on TGV Atlantique from Paris Montparnasse station.

Having a small area (7.23 square kilometres (2.79 mi^{2})), Saint-Georges-du-Bois is traversed in the south by the Le Mans–Angers railway.

The boundaries of the municipalities have slightly changed over the centuries. It seems that the farms of Grand Beauvais and Cherelles, were attached to the parish of Fay until the mid-eighteenth century, when Fay as redistricted removing Pruillé-le-Chétif and Saint-Georges-du-Bois. Also, in January 1991, some of the streets in Allonnes were redistricted, becoming boisgeorgiens.

Two geodetic points, listed by IGN, are located in the municipality. These are the two high points, and visible from a great distance (several miles), which are used: the spire of the church and the water tower. There are also eleven benchmarks spread throughout the town.

=== Geology and terrain ===
The lowest point of the municipality, 48 metres (157 ft), is between the farm of Herpinière and the railway (47°57′25.37″N 0°06′28.55″E), while the highest point, 102 metres (335 ft) is between the Grand Beauvais farm and Petite brosse farm (47°59′18″N 0°05′43″E). The front of the church is at an altitude of 82 metres (269 ft).

The geology of Saint-Georges-du-Bois is almost entirely composed of sand and sandstone of Maine, dating from the Cenomanian era. Two areas of exceptions along the Orne Champagne are alluvial deposits (sands, silts and peats) and between the Libroreau farm and the railroad, composed of Glauconite clay, used in iron ore, date back to the lower Cenomanian. This clay is also found around the alluvium along the river.

=== Hydrology ===
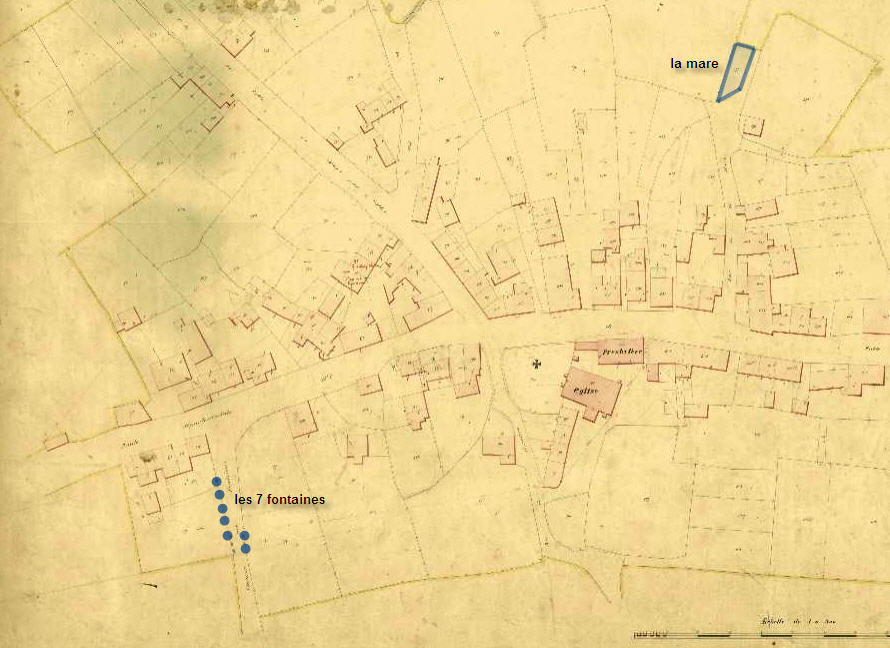
1844 – Location of the old pond and the seven springs

There is only one water course of consequence through the town: the Orne champagne. This is a direct tributary of the Sarthe. It is a small river, with an average rate of 0.342 cubic metres (12.1 ft^{3}) per second. It bypasses the town to the north and crosses the Souligné-Flacé road at the Gué Perroux bridge. This is where the communal washhouse of 1855 stood in 1956 (47°58′16.64″N 0°05′24.31″E).

Two small streams that flow through the town empty into the Orne champenoise at Étival-lès-le-Mans: Liboreau Creek (south-west of the town) (47°58′01.07″N 0°06′21.85″E) and the Beaumerie stream (located west of the town) (47°58′10.23″N 0°05′06.75″E).

Water has always been a big problem for the town, strongly hindering its expansion until 1956, date of creation of the drinking water system. Until then, the town had as a sole water source Orne champenoise (located a few hundred meters from the village), a pool (located at the end of the current impasse of the pond), often dry and seven springs, six of which were private or reserved for a certain population (clergy, municipal employees). These fountains still exist in the current street fountains and on the back of the church.

=== Ecology ===
==== ZNIEFF natural area ====
An area of Saint-Georges-du-Bois is listed as "natural area of ecological interest, flora and fauna – Second Generation" number 004161 by Regional Directorate of the Environment. Described in 1999, the registration was validated in 2005. This area, with an area of 6 hectare, is part of the Gué Perroux woods located on the road to Souligné-Flacé (47°58′31″N 0°05′25″E).

The criteria for the regional management of the environment for the inclusion of this area are

Delimitation based on the presence of a protected species within a biotope of heritage interest (swamp woods) plant species. ... This is an extensive wooded part of a valley, the lower areas being occupied by a marshy area crossed by a stream, welcoming a large population of a protected plant species in Pays de la Loire and the limit of its range in our department: the Cardamine amara.

— ZNIEFF, Critère d'inscription de la ZNIEFF (Criteria for inclusion in ZNIEFF)

Bitter cress grows in very moist, shady places. This plant is edible and tastes like watercress.

==== Sustainable development ====
Like most French communes, Saint-Georges-du-Bois works towards a better environment and follows the recommendations of Grenelle Environnement. Thus, a proactive plan to reduce power consumption of streetlights is in progress; while gradually renewing the old lights and using low energy light bulbs or other renewable energy sources.

The commissioning of a new wastewater treatment plant in 2009, after more than 2 years of work, has significantly reduced usage that is now well below current and future standards. Plans are to become more efficient with biological and chemical treatment of phosphorus, removal of nitrates in water output and a no bad smells from the sludge storage in sealed tanks.

Since 2002, the establishment, the community of communes of Bocage Cenomani, the sorting and valuation allows the community to offer many solutions to people: individual recycling bins, buckets for green waste, bins for large volumes, individual composters. The results are in: 172 kilograms (379 lb)/capita/year of household waste and 73.5 kilograms (162 lb)/person/year of recyclables or 245.5 kilograms (541 lb)/capita/year while the estimated average by French Eco-Packaging is 391 kilograms (862 lb)/person/year.

Since March 2010, at the request of the municipality, Sarthe Habitat 1st manager of social housing for Sarthe built the first social BBCs (bâtiment de basse consommation (low consumption buildings)) consisting of 20 houses with reinforced insulation, condensing, hot water by solar panels. The second phase is in progress, starting October 2009, with the launch of a study to create an ecodistrict: energy producing homes, ecologically sound roads, and intensive recycling. A third step started with the construction of 19 Habitat Sarthe BBC rental housing in the town. This work should start in 2012.

The construction of the school cafeteria, which opened on 13 October 2007, follows the concepts of HQE (Haute Qualité Environnementale (High Environmental Quality)) with a frame and wood cladding, solar panels for production of hot water, tanks for rainwater collection, and a choice of materials and energy used conforming with the logic of sustainable development.

=== Climate ===
The climate of Saint-Georges-du-Bois is an oceanic climate. At this distance, the influence of the ocean is still noticeable, but weakened. The rainfall is weaker than in areas near the ocean. The city has about 54 days of frost a year, 1824 hours of sunshine with 249 hours in July and 57 hours in December. This area has 114 days of precipitation which is 678 millimetres (26.7 in) cumulative, ten snow days, sixteen days with thunderstorm and fifty-one days with fog.

The coldest temperature record was −21.0 °C (−5.8 °F) on 29 December 1964 while the hottest record temperature was 40.5 °C (104.9 °F) on 6 August 2003.

Climate data for Mans (as of 24 April 2012)
Month	Jan	Feb	Mar	Apr	May	Jun	Jul	Aug	Sep	Oct	Nov	Dec	Year
Record high °F (°C)	63.0 (17.2)	69.8 (21.0)	76.8 (24.9)	86.5 (30.3)	90.3 (32.4)	98.8 (37.1)	104.7 (40.4)	104.9 (40.5)	94.3 (34.6)	86.0 (30.0)	71.4 (21.9)	64.9 (18.3)	104.9 (40.5)
Mean daily maximum °F (°C)	46.2 (7.9)	48.4 (9.1)	55.0 (12.8)	60.3 (15.7)	67.1 (19.5)	73.6 (23.1)	77.9 (25.5)	77.9 (25.5)	71.4 (21.9)	62.6 (17.0)	52.5 (11.4)	46.8 (8.2)	61.7 (16.5)
Daily mean °F (°C)	41.0 (5.0)	41.9 (5.5)	46.9 (8.3)	51.3 (10.7)	58.1 (14.5)	64.0 (17.8)	67.8 (19.9)	67.5 (19.7)	61.7 (16.5)	55.0 (12.8)	46.6 (8.1)	41.7 (5.4)	53.6 (12.0)
Mean daily minimum °F (°C)	35.8 (2.1)	35.2 (1.8)	38.8 (3.8)	42.1 (5.6)	48.9 (9.4)	54.3 (12.4)	57.6 (14.2)	56.8 (13.8)	51.8 (11.0)	47.5 (8.6)	40.5 (4.7)	36.5 (2.5)	45.5 (7.5)
Record low °F (°C)	−0.8 (−18.2)	1.4 (−17.0)	11.7 (−11.3)	23.2 (−4.9)	25.3 (−3.7)	34.9 (1.6)	39.0 (3.9)	37.8 (3.2)	31.1 (−0.5)	22.3 (−5.4)	10.4 (−12.0)	−5.8 (−21.0)	−5.8 (−21.0)
Average rainfall inches (mm)	2.65 (67.2)	2.00 (50.9)	2.14 (54.3)	2.12 (53.9)	2.48 (63.1)	1.85 (46.9)	2.24 (56.8)	1.68 (42.7)	2.08 (52.9)	2.60 (66.0)	2.47 (62.7)	2.76 (70.2)	27.07 (687.6)
Average rainy days	11.2	9.3	10.2	9.5	10.0	7.3	7.6	6.5	8.0	10.7	10.5	11.8	112.6
Average snowy days	2.4	2.8	0.9	0.6	0.1	0.0	0.0	0.0	0.0	0.0	0.5	1.3	8.6
Mean monthly sunshine hours	65.4	90.9	134.3	171.4	196.7	220.1	233.7	233.6	180.0	121.6	75.1	60.2	1,773
Source: LaMeteo.org

=== Channels of Communication and transport ===
==== Current Main Roads ====
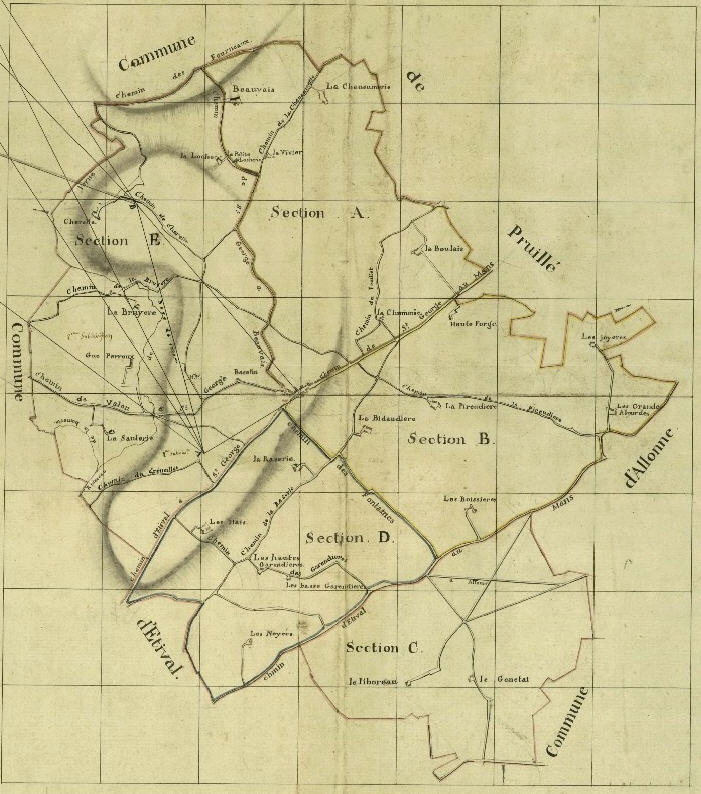
Napoleonic Map of Saint-Georges-du-Bois in 1809

Saint-Georges-du-Bois is one of many French towns that grew beside a main roadways. For Saint-Georges-du-Bois, this is the county road 309. The main road was renamed several times:

- County road 1 by imperial decree of 16 December 1811
- National Road 768 from 1933 until 1973
- County road 309 (or CD 309) since.

Another road connects to county road 309 in the town center. This is county road 22 (the road to Souligné-Flacé) originally called arterial highway 10 by imperial decree. It was laid out in 1840 and the bridge crossing the Orne champenoise since 1852.

Georges-du-Bois in 1809. The first road signs were implemented in 1860, while the signs with the names of localities were installed over 100 years later, in 1968. Finally, the house numbers were assigned in April 1977.

==== Old roadways ====
The Sarthe departmental archives have uncovered the ancient names of other roads in the county.

Arterial highways:

- No. 10: currently provincial road 22 to Souligné-Flacé
- No. 11: currently route of the "cinq routes" (five roads) passing by the train station
- No. 26: currently path of chemin de Bel-Air

Major roads

- No. 4: currently road to Étival-lès-le-Mans in Saint-Georges-du-Bois (connecting to the "cinq routes")

Local roads:

- No. 2: currently rue de la Croix Sainte-Apolline
- No. 2: currently chemin de Montgré to Allonnes
- No. 2: currently route du Pavillon laid out in 1874. Bureaucrats having given us the joy of having, in history, three paths No. 2 in different places of the town.

Byways:

- No. 2: currently road from Saint-Georges-du-Bois to cinq routes (which was also called arterial highway No.11)
- No. 3: currently rue des Fouillées
- No. 4: currently route of Étival-lès-le-Mans to Allonnes laid out in 1871
- No. 6: currently chemin de Cherelles

Rural roads:

- No. 1: currently rue des Fontaines laid out in 1892
- No. 2: chemin de La Locherie
- No. 3: currently road of Pruillé-le-Chétif laid out in 1902
- No. 5: chemin du Gué Perroux to Pruillé-le-Chétif (probably chemin de la fosse aux loups)
- No. 8: currently chemin des cinq routes to Génetay (which was also named arterial highway No. 10)
- No. 15: chemin des Hayes au Parc
- No. 18: chemin de la Foret at Montgré
- No. 20: chemin du petit Pin au Grand Liboreau
- No. 23: from la croix Sainte-Apolline to Allonnes (by Piraudiere)
- No. 24: chemin de La Locherie to the carrefour de la Chanière
- No. 25: currently chemin de la Cheminée
- No. 26: chemin de la Ferme des Roches to carrefour de la Chanière

Finally, in the course of history, some streets names have changed:

- Rue de la mare: currently impasse de la Mare
- Chemin des Sablons: currently rue des Fouillées
- Street Pruillé: street no longer exists across from rue des Fouillées
- Rue de derrière: street no longer exists along the city hall and going down to the bottom of town.

==== Rail ====
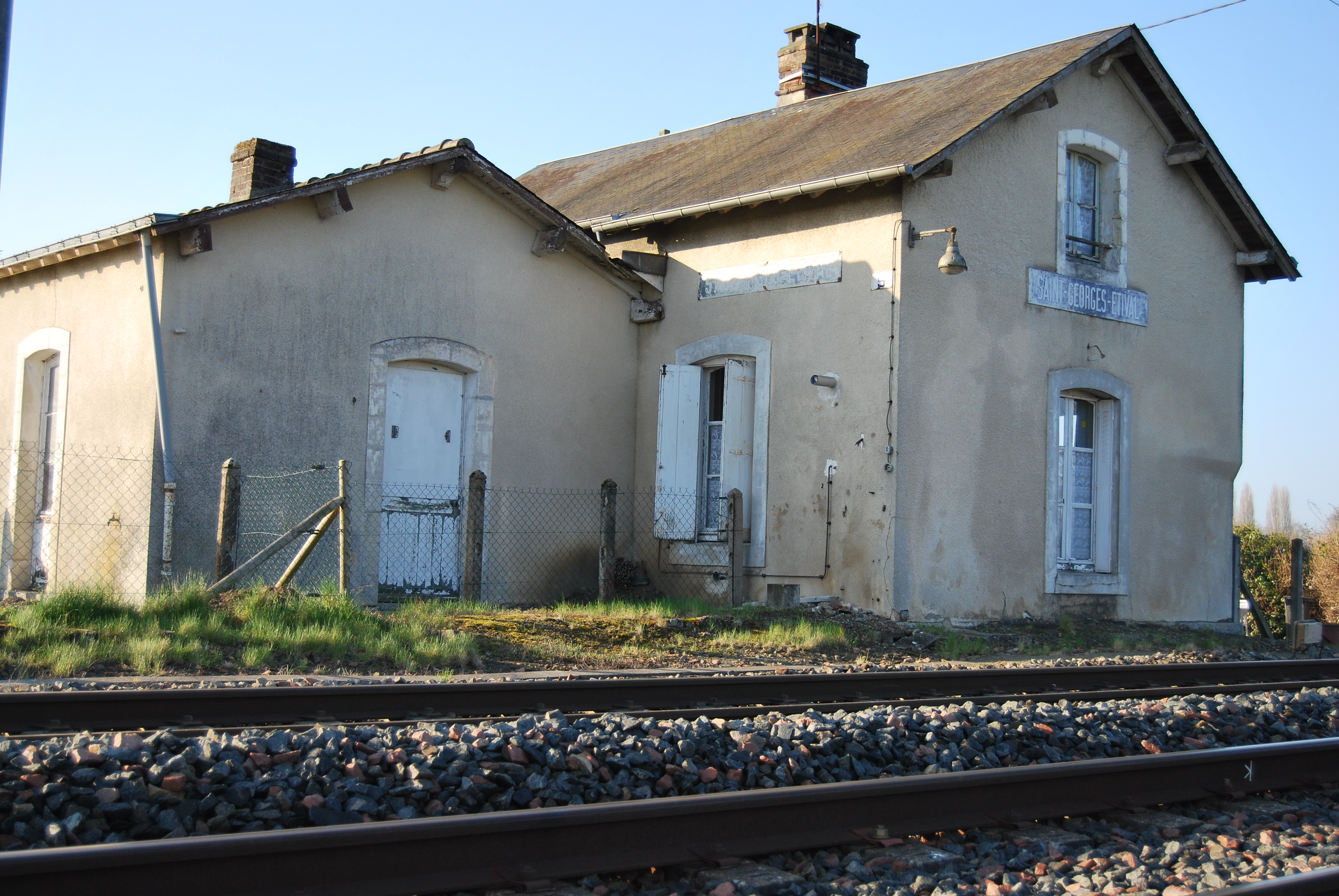
Saint-Georges-du-Bois Train Station

The Le Mans–Angers railway passes through the town. This railway is currently, among others, borrowed by the Atlantic TGV (see the train station 47°57′31.32″N 0°06′46.88″E). It was created in 1863 by Compagnie des chemins de fer de l'Ouest.

A train station was requested in August 1864, and repeatedly refused. A railway stop was built at railroad crossing No. 5 (named Genetay) and inaugurated by the prefect on 12 August 1900 to serve Allonnes, Étival-lès-le-Mans and Saint-Georges-du-Bois. Trains stopped in Saint-Georges-du-Bois until September 1971.

The railroad crossing number No. 5 was removed in October 1979. This is the only point of direct passage for the residents of the south end of the town, who must henceforth make a big detour (about 2.5 kilometres (1.6 mi) to reach the town.

Many railway projects were proposed that also affected the town, but none came to pass:

- In August 1876, there was a streetcar project from Le Mans to Loué which would have crossed the town,
- In August 1882, the initial streetcar project from Le Mans to Saint-Denis-d'Orques through the town. The draft was amended and finally took the route of Lava
- In July 1891, the town required a slight detour to the future course of streetcar from Le Mans to Cérans-Foulletourte which makes a stop at de la croix Sainte Apolline. The route was changed and no longer passed through the town,
- In June 1997, the proposed Brittany high-speed line considering a move north of the town. This project has since been changed.

==== Public transportation ====
Saint-Georges-du-Bois is served by Transports interurbain de la Sarthe (TIS). The bus line 8 (Sablé-sur-Sarthe – Le Mans) makes two stops in the town during its eight daily passages.

Several lines of school buses take students to Allonnes to Marin college at John Fitzgerald Kennedy college or high school André Malraux. Another line leads to the St. Joseph Lorraine school group of Pruillé-Chétif.

== City planning ==
=== Urban morphology ===
Although the town is small (723 hectare), it includes numerous farms. Thus, There are no less than 76 localities that are still identifiable.

Between the road to Le Mans (CD 309) and the road to Pruillé-Chétif (CR 3) are: Ardriers (Les), Bel-Air, Boulaie (La), Champfleury, Chaussumerie (La), Cheminée (La), Chevrons (Les), Forge (La), Fouillés (Les), Grande Gate (La), Kledy, Poulardière (La), Roche (La), Rosiers (Les), Sablière (La), Tamaris (Les), Vallée (La) and Vivier (Le).

Between the road of Pruillé-Chétif (CR 3) and the road to Souligné-Flacé (CD 22) are: Bruyère (La), Champ du Cormier (Le), Champ Mignerai (Le), Chérelle, Fleuprie (La), Grand Beauvais (Le), Grande Locherie (La), Gué Perroux (Le), Liard (Le), Magnolias (Les), Mésangère (La) and Petite Locherie (La).

Between the road of Souligné-Flacé (CD 22) and the road to Étival-lès-le-Mans (CD 309), we find: Cantinière (La), Champ des Bruyères (Le), Maison du Gué (La), Petite Saulerie (La) and Pièce du Milieu (La).

Between the road of Étival-lès-le-Mans (CD 309) and chemin des cinq routes (VC 2 and VC 8) includes: Basses Garandières (Les), Blanchardière (La), Chaleries (Les), Champs des Landes (Le), Croix (La), Garandières (Les), Genetay (Le), Grand Jardin (Le), Grand Libroreau (Le), Hautes Garandières (Les), Hayes (Les), Herpinière (La), Petit Liboreau (Le), Petit Pin (Le), Petite Lande (La), Petit Parc (Le), Raserie (La) and Yuccas (Les).

Between the chemin des cinq routes(VC 2 and VC 8) and the route to Le Mans (CD 309), we find: Alourdes (Les), Bideaudière (La), Boissières (Les), Bourgeons (Les), Champ du Poirier (Le), Cytises (Les), Floralies (Les), Grandes Alourdes (Les), Haute Forge (La), Joyères (Les), Lande Du Pavillon (La), Landes (Les), Lilas (Les), Maison Neuve, Montgré, Noyers (Les), Pastorale (La), Petit Chanteloup (Le), Piraudière (La), Point du Jour (Le), Quatre Ventes (Les), Sapinière Du Pavillon (La) and Tournes (Les).

Over the years, some differences were swallowed by the development of the town or have simply disappeared. Thus, the Courroye is the house at the corner of Le Mans and the Rue du Château d'Eau, Le Bassetin mansion is located on ue de Souligné, of Trompe-Souris, there are only a few ruins on the edge of the chemin du Calvaire (47°58′29″N 0°05′32″E), Fouillet is the hangar at the edge of the town (left) on the road to Pruillé-Chétif (47°58′36″N 0°05′52″E).

=== Housing ===
Matching the growth in population, housing has increased significantly in the last 40 years. From 193 homes in 1968, the number rose to 888 in 2017, 847 of which are primary residences. The vast majority, 95.8% (850 houses) are single family homes.

Of the 821 principal residences (in 2015), 9.3% (77 houses) predate 1945. These are mainly small village homes or isolated farms. Most houses (44.6%) were built between 1971 and 1990, and 21.1% between 2006 and 2014. 61.5% of the homes have five rooms and more.

Since the early 2000s, construction resumed in the town, with the main aim to stabilize the population and school enrollment. These include the subdivisions of Bassetin (fifty-three houses), Trompe-Souris (seven houses), Pasteur (seven apartments and eight houses) and Clos des cèdres 1 and 2 with fourteen houses. Finally, since 2007, the subdivision of Park Hayes has emerged, with 156 homes completed. Twenty are housing intended for homeowners (delivered in 2011), and nineteen are apartments located in 4 small groups (start of construction planned for in 2012). Fifty homes were completed as of 19 September 2011.

=== Improvement projects ===
There are several current development projects, but only one can be considered as a major project:: the PLU. The current POS (land use plan), which dates from 2002, will soon expire and new studies will be started in 2014 for the next PLU. Effectively, the SRU and the Grenelle Environment impose new rules that will require that certain planning issues be managed in the PLU. Nevertheless, there is sufficient developable land in the town to sustain several years of development.

Other projects are of lesser importance. Following the relocation of the library in January 2011, releasing the ground floor of the Town Hall for use, the redevelopment of the Town Hall is being studied.

A project farther in the future is the creation or modification of footpaths: elimination of the current portions of roads and creation of protected paths connecting different parts of the town, creating a secure way to access parc de la Rivière (River park), creating a green belt around the town (much of which already exists) and linking with Green Boulevard of Le Mans.

The master plan of the Le Mans regional plan of 2001 provides a draft belt road which will connect Allonnes to Université du Mans (Le Mans University) serving in the peri-urban area west of Le Mans, namely Saint-Georges-du-Bois. However, this project is currently stalled due to the refusal of the town of Rouillon to allow this blet road across its area.

== Toponymy ==
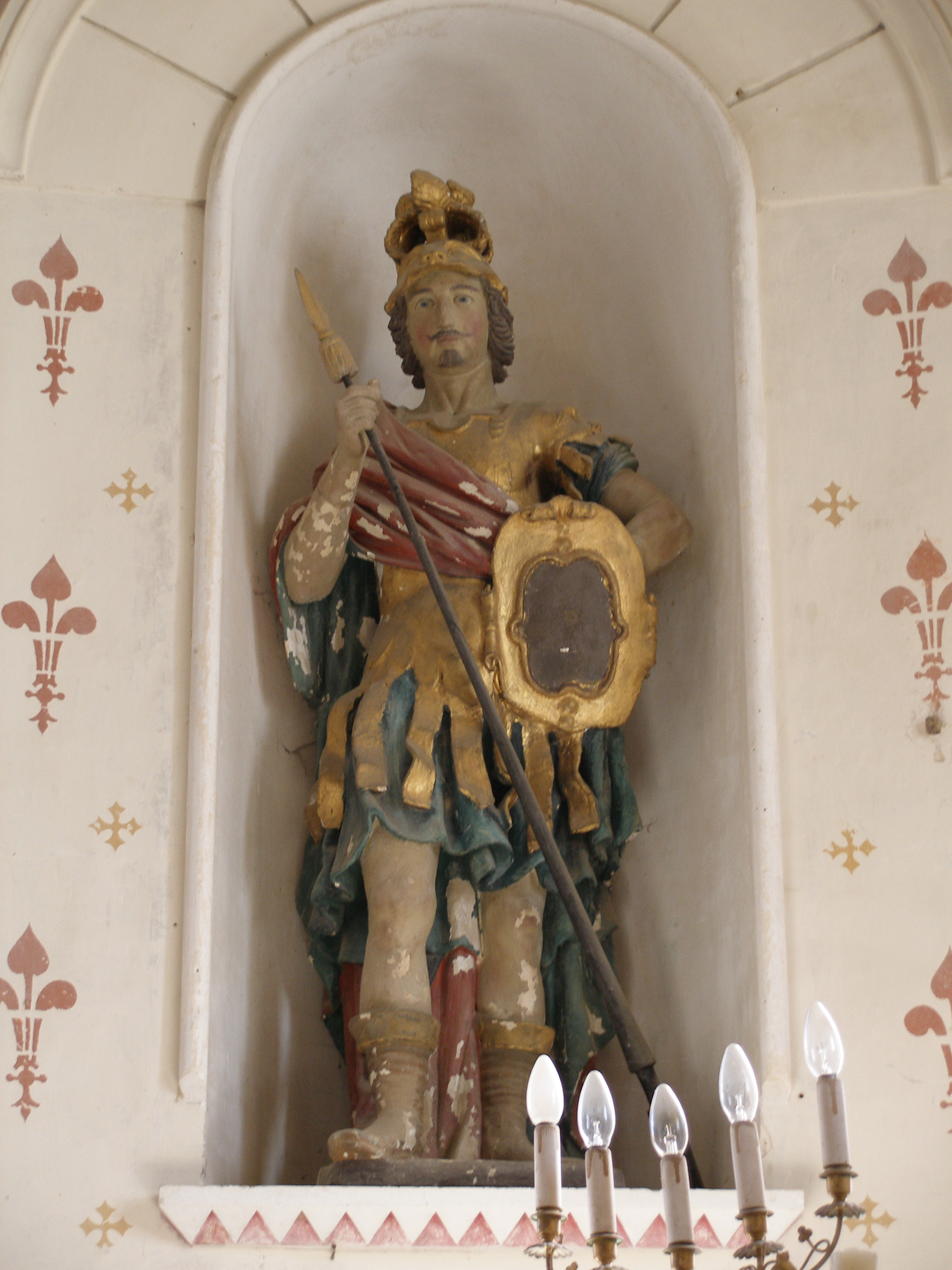
Saint Georges in the church of Saint-Georges-du-Bois in June 2006

The town is named after the patron saint of the parish and its former location in the woods. St. George was a forest, cut by a small road (currently Sablé-sur-Sarthe road).

According to the book Noms de personne sur le territoire de l'ancienne Gaule du VIe au XIIe siècle (Personal names in the territory of ancient Gaul from the sixth to the twelfth century), Volume 3, "traces of the existence of the town date from 1131. The town was then called 'Sanctus Georgius de Nemore' or 'Seu de Bosco', then in 1289, 'Seint Jorge'.

Despite the fact that many municipalities have Saint-Georges or bois in their names, there are few towns named Saint-Georges-du-Bois. Three exist in France, and one abroad: San Giorgio in Bosco in Italy.

Since then, the town has been known by at least three different French names.

The oldest name found in the departmental archives of the Sarthe is Saint Georges le Grand (Saint George the Great) (or Saint George Le Grand on Cassini maps). This name was used on the oldest parish registers in 1671 and it seems to officially change in 1692. However, on the handwritten pages of records, this name was still used in the middle of the eighteenth century.

Le Grand Saint Georges is regarded as the customary usage of the time. Indeed, this name was used when installing road signposts in October 1860, but it was never an official name; it is not used in any official document. However, it is found on handwritten portions of the parish registers for over a hundred years.

The official name of the town is Saint-Georges-du-Bois, from the creation of the commune during the French Revolution.

== History ==
=== Héraldique, logotype et devise ===

This coat of arms of Saint-Georges-du-Bois is still in use today, and was described by its author Jean-Claude Molinier, on request of the city council in October 1999:

Blue with silver wood, the head of which is charged with a cross of Gules.

The blue symbolizes the Orne champenoise River which crosses the common area, the trees represents part of the village name. The head is in the colors of St George who is represented in many ways, as he slays the dragon, the dragon alone, or else the red cross on a silver background, reprising the design on his shield, and is the symbol of England of which he is the patron saint. The ornaments represent wheat as a reminder of the importance of agricultural activity, and the crown of towers is the symbol of communes.

Former Coat of Arms of St Georges du Bois

Gules, a gold crossdocked in dexter a palm of the same, and sinister a silver palm.

A trace of the old coat of arms of the town still exists in the town. It is in the church, in the center of the railing of the platform. As the town has two martyrs for patrons, it is gules (red) to the gold staff (as a reminder that the abbess of the Prado is presenting the cure), with the right of the gold palm for St. George and, a palm silver palm for St. Apollonia.

=== From the Cenomani to the Revolution ===
The history of Saint-Georges-du-Bois is fairly recent.

However, traces of stone Roman cupola furnaces were found during excavation of new subdivisions (Parc des Hayes) (47°58′01″N 0°05′41″E). [Radiocarbon dating] of 2000–2300 years show the human presence in the town since the Iron Age.

Research by Marie-Thérèse Morlet for her book Noms de personne sur le territoire de l'ancienne Gaule du VIe au XIIe siècle (Names of persons on the territory of ancient Gaul from the sixth to the twelfth century), Volume 3, "indicate the first written records of the existence of the town about 1131".

According to Le Patrimoine des Communes de la Sarthe

In the Middle Ages, the village grew around the church, which then depended on the Abbey Saint Julien du Pré in Le Mans, which has a priory in the parish. In 1626, a contagious disease, perhaps the plague, invaded the Le Mans and Saint-Georges-du-Bois. The judges of the Le Mans then decided that the poor and the sick of the parish would be fed at the expense of the city, and they enabled religious orders and the people of Saint-Georges-du-Bois to remove objects affected by the contagion

.

The late eighteenth century was very active in Saint-Georges-du-Bois. Indeed, during the Chouannerie, Saint-Georges-du-Bois was a usual place of rendezvous of the insurgents. Two main facts are stated in the works of the nineteenth century. On 25 December 1795, 500 chouans attacked a military detachment of 45 Republicans to release six defendants accused of rape and murder. The battle lasted several hours between Saint-Georges-du-Bois and Souligné-Flacé and cause many deaths and injuries. On 12 October 1799, the main army of the Chouans arrived at La Suze-sur-Sarthe and stopped at Saint-Georges-du-Bois to prepare, in peace, the attack on the Le Mans in coordination with the troops arriving by Pontlieue and the road Laval]. The army, under the command of Count Bourmont between 13 October 1799 in Le Mans and returned in the evening at his camp in Saint-Georges-du-Bois. The next day, a column of 1,500 men returned to Le Mans with the Knight Tercier, but the commander in chief, the Earl of Bourmont, who was tired, rested at the camp. The army chouans remained, in total, three days in Saint-Georges-du-Bois before moving to other cities.

=== 19th century ===
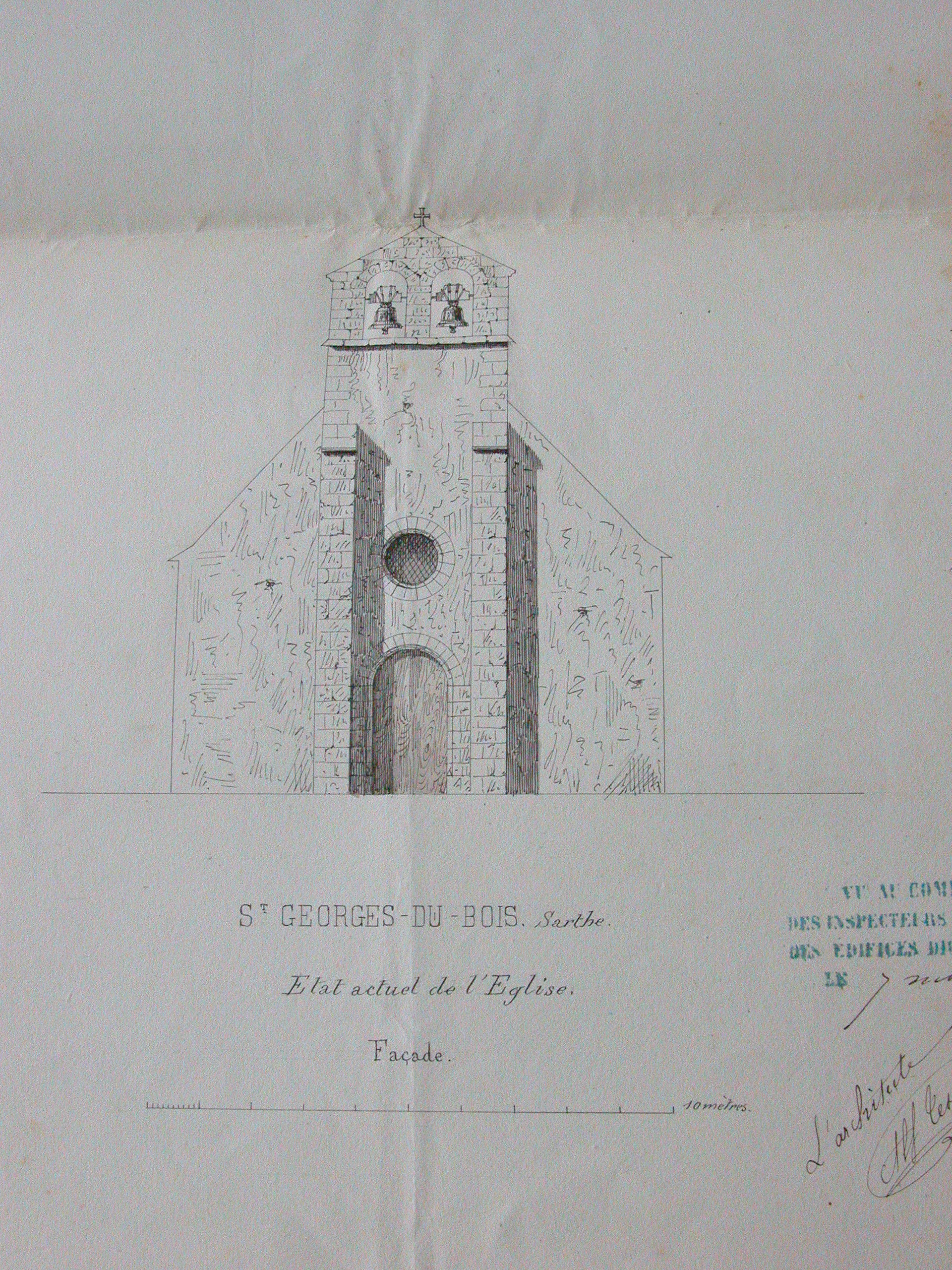
Facade of the church in Saint-Georges-du-Bois in 1855

The nineteenth century saw the middle-class population grow until 1850, then go down in the second half of this century. The causes seem to be, according to the records of municipal councils, problems of water supply, financial, and sometimes disease.

In 1816, the town bought a fountain to give public access: this is the first resource and reliable public water in the municipality. There would be no other source 140 years. Studies to install a laundry on the banks of the Orne champenoise were initiated in 1855. The laundry was built in 1858; a dam is installed in 1861. The laundry and the dam are repeatedly destroyed by flooding.

It was not until 1840 the arterial highway No. 10 (currently Souligné-Flacé Road) was laid out, going to Loué. Then, in 1852, the bridge over the Orne champenoise was set up, ending the middle-class part of this axis. The route of the local road No. 2 was opened in 1874 (current route to Pavillon between Saint-Georges-du-Bois Allonnes). The end of the century saw an acceleration of roadworks with the construction of many trails, roads or highways to crisscross the town and facilitate access between farms and the village.

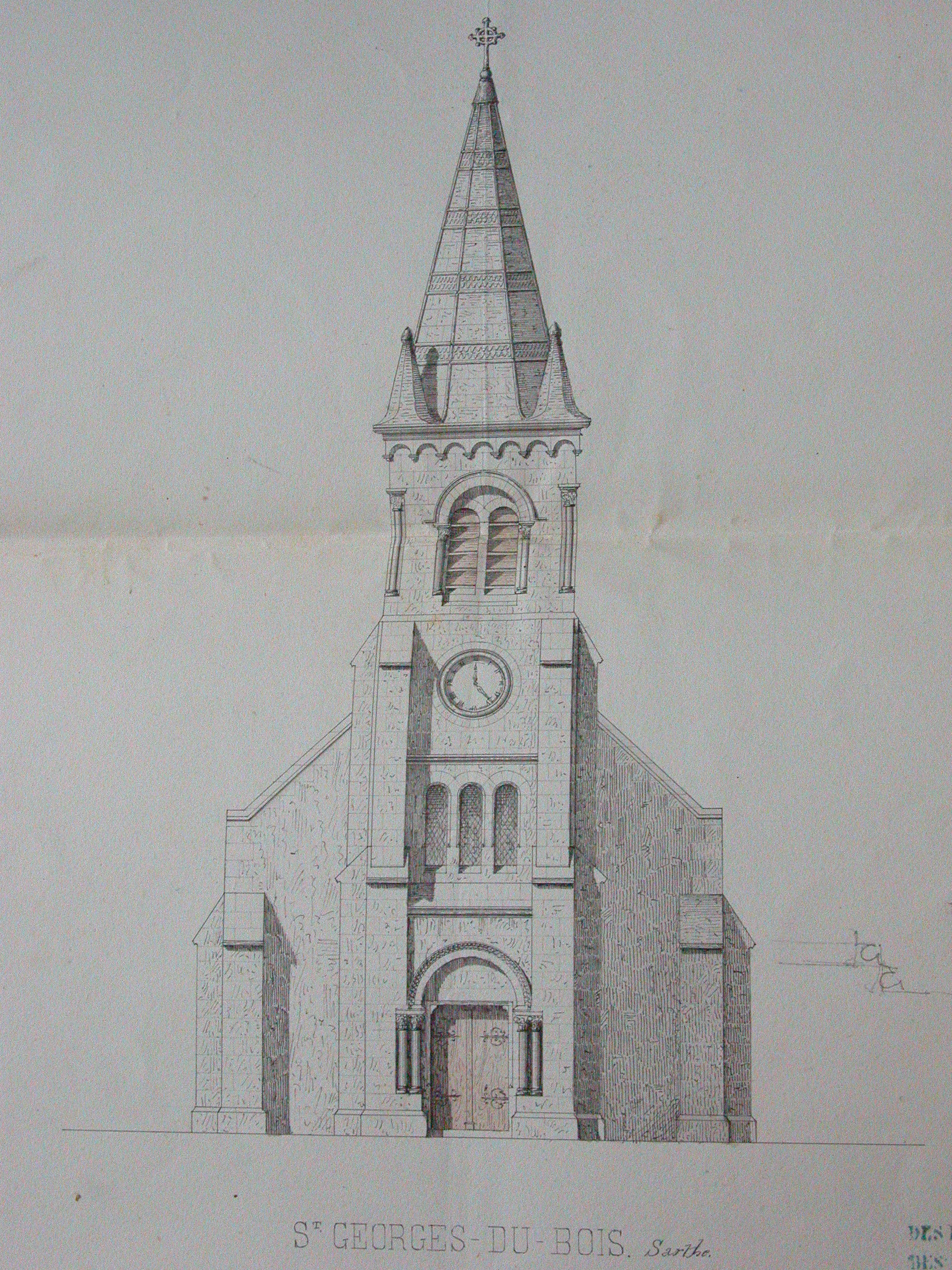
l'église de Saint-Georges-du-Bois int 1855

The year 1848 saw the launch of major changes in the district. First, the cemetery changed location. Until then the cemetery was in front of the church, to Sablé-sur-Sarthe, its current location. The wall is built in 1851 and former displaced in 1855 graves. Then, using the free space, and despite a chronic lack of funds, the town launched a major project in 1854: the expansion of the church. The work is completed in 1859, but many defects and delays forced on the municipality numerous studies (frozen stone, rotten belfry). \

In 1851, the town rented a home (to Miss Rose Hulot) to create the elementary school for boys. It also hosted girls 1852. Through imperial subsidies, this house is purchased in 1862. Then, in 1866, the school became too small, the town rented a new building to establish a second school in Saint-Georges-du-Bois for girls. Finally, in 1883, the town bought the land at 26 rue de Sable (in Molière) to build a school for girls. It was opened after much long talk in 1889.

In 1863, the Le Mans–Angers railway crossed the south of the town, but it was not until 36 years later that one could take the train at the station of Saint-Georges-du-Bois.

In March 1898, a public truck scale was installed on the church square.

The year 1900 ended with a bang ending the nineteenth century.

Indeed, in February, the city council agreed to the connections at the departmental telephone network; but it was not until September 1944 the phone system was installed at the town hall.

Another important event for the year 1900, the train stop, being anticipated for 36 years, was inaugurated by the prefect of the Sarthe on 12 August 1900. The stop at this station was discontinued September 1971 and the railroad crossing in Genetay in October 1979. The Boisgeorgiens living behind the railway must now make a big detour to reach the village (4 kilometres (2.5 mi)).

=== 20th century ===
The year 1908 saw the creation of a postal office in the town. The post office was purchased February 1921 then rebuilt by the municipality. A true Post Office opened April 1923.

The communal pool of Homond, located at impasse de la Mare, which had dried up years before, was sold in August 1910. The water tower was built in 1956, providing, finally, the drinking water and running water in the commune. A few months later, the laundry, on the Orne champenoise, was removed.

Eleven years after the investigation of public lighting concession, the town joined syndicat intercommunal électrique du nord du Mans (the electric municipal association Le Mans north) and extensions in 1924. Municipal buildings are electrified during June 1932, while street lighting was installed in January 1935. The town began to electrify the outer parts of the village during August 1949, initially with: a Grande Locherie.

The first paved road from the town was the main communication road No. 26 (current path of Bel-Air) in March 1928. This likely became the entrance to the town by Pruillé-le-Chétif road.

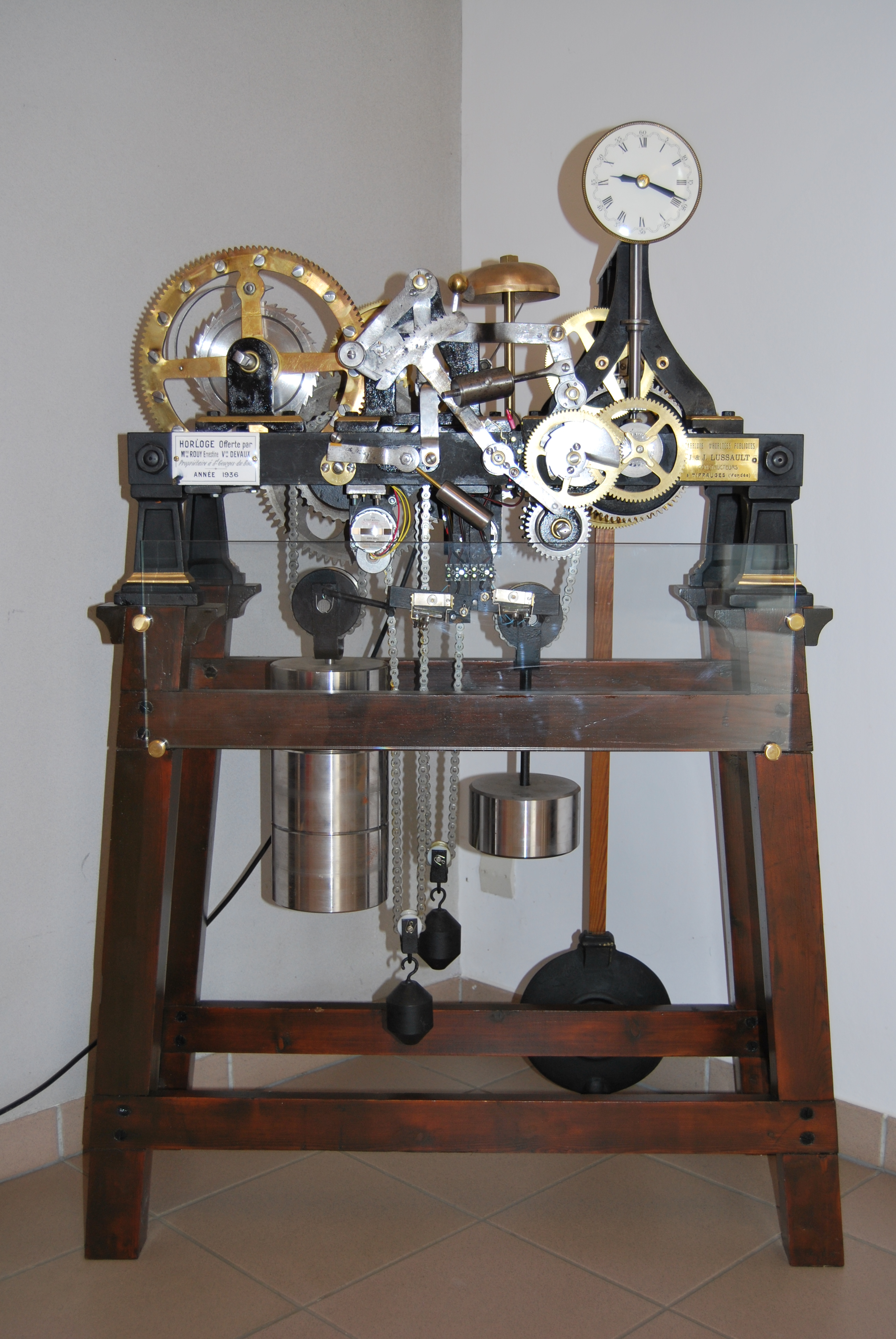
Clock from the church at Saint-Georges-du-Bois

In January 1936, Mrs. Devaux donated a clock to the church. Unfortunately, the tower was bombed on 18 June 1940 and the clock stopped working. This clock is now in the City Council Chambers, completely renovated by Didier Choplin, restorer of old clocks from Chaufour-Notre-Dame. Funny detail: since the cock of the church was in very poor condition, the city council decided on 11 December 1950 to put it out of its misery with one shot. The rectory, which was almost destroyed, is completely renovated. The grand opening took place on 22 September 1996, by Mr. François Fillon.

In the sad aftermath of the First World War, a memorial was erected in front of the church in May 1920, with dozens of deaths recorded for this small town of less than 500 inhabitants. It was moved in March 1997 to the back of the church during the redevelopment of the site. The end of World War II in Saint-Georges-du Bois, took place on 8 August 1944. On the way between Château-Gontier and Le Mans, the town was liberated by the French 2nd Armored Division led by General Leclerc which liberated Le Mans in stride and Alençon four days later.

The Girls School (now part of the old kindergarten) was built in 1952. Many works ensuing to expand the two schools (boys and girls) until 1963 The new kindergarten was completed in July 1976. Central heating was installed at the same time on the old part. The new elementary school opened in 1981.

The truck scale was installed in 1898 in Town Hall Square, unused for years, was sold to Mr. Leffray of Étival-lès-le-Mans in February 1960.

The first sewers were installed in town in August 1965, making a house collapse. The wastewater treatment plant, built with Étival-lès-le-Mans, was inaugurated in June 1974. A major part of the work continued in the spring 1988, with the arrival of gas mains in the village. In May 1993, the new City Hall was opened. It is still located in the old school, which became too small and required extensive repairs. The decision to rebuild was then preferred.

The first newspaper, the News Bulletin, a quarterly at the time, appeared in May 1977.

=== 21st century ===
Until 2003, it bothered no on that the school of Saint-Georges-du-Bois had no name. Following a suggestion by the school council, the school was named Groupe scolaire Trompe-Souris (Trompe-Souris School group) on 13 February 2003, the name of the farm that worked the fields where the school is located. Then, after many years of study and financial research, the new cafeteria was built in compliance with the High Environmental Quality (HEQ) standards. At the same time, much work was done on the school grounds: the kindergarten as renovated, a new playground, a new preschool. While this is finally dedicated on 13 October 2007 by François Fillon (French prime minister), Roland du Luart (President of the ), Marc Joulaud (MP in the French National Assembly), Michel Camux (prefect of Sarthe).

In the area of infrastructure, in June 2004, Saint-Georges-du-Bois was linked to the digital world. The Asymmetric Digital Subscriber Line (ADSL) was received with difficulty (petition, meeting) by the town. But at the same time, the post office closed its doors on 31 December 2006 as a result of a unilateral decision by the management of the French Post Office. A communal postal agency was created in the offices of the mayor and opened on 2 January 2007.

Over the last 30 years, there has been grocery stores in the town. These shops, at first independent, were supported and assisted by the town several times. Changing owners many times, managers and teachers (the town even purchased the walls rented to the merchant). Despite this, the store closed its doors in 2005. Also, the opening, on 22 August 2007, a convenience store of 700 square metres (7,500 ft^{2}) finally restored the grocery trade.

Under construction throughout the year 2009, the town center is undergoing a profound change. The networks that were renovated or replaced: rainwater, drinking water, sanitation, landfill, electricity and telephone networks. Then, during the study for the repair of roads and pavements, a security section was decided on 20 July 2009: creating a 30 km/h zone, changing priorities, an area of quiet operation of vehicles, and disabled access. The second phase, in 2010, extended this project over several hundred meters.

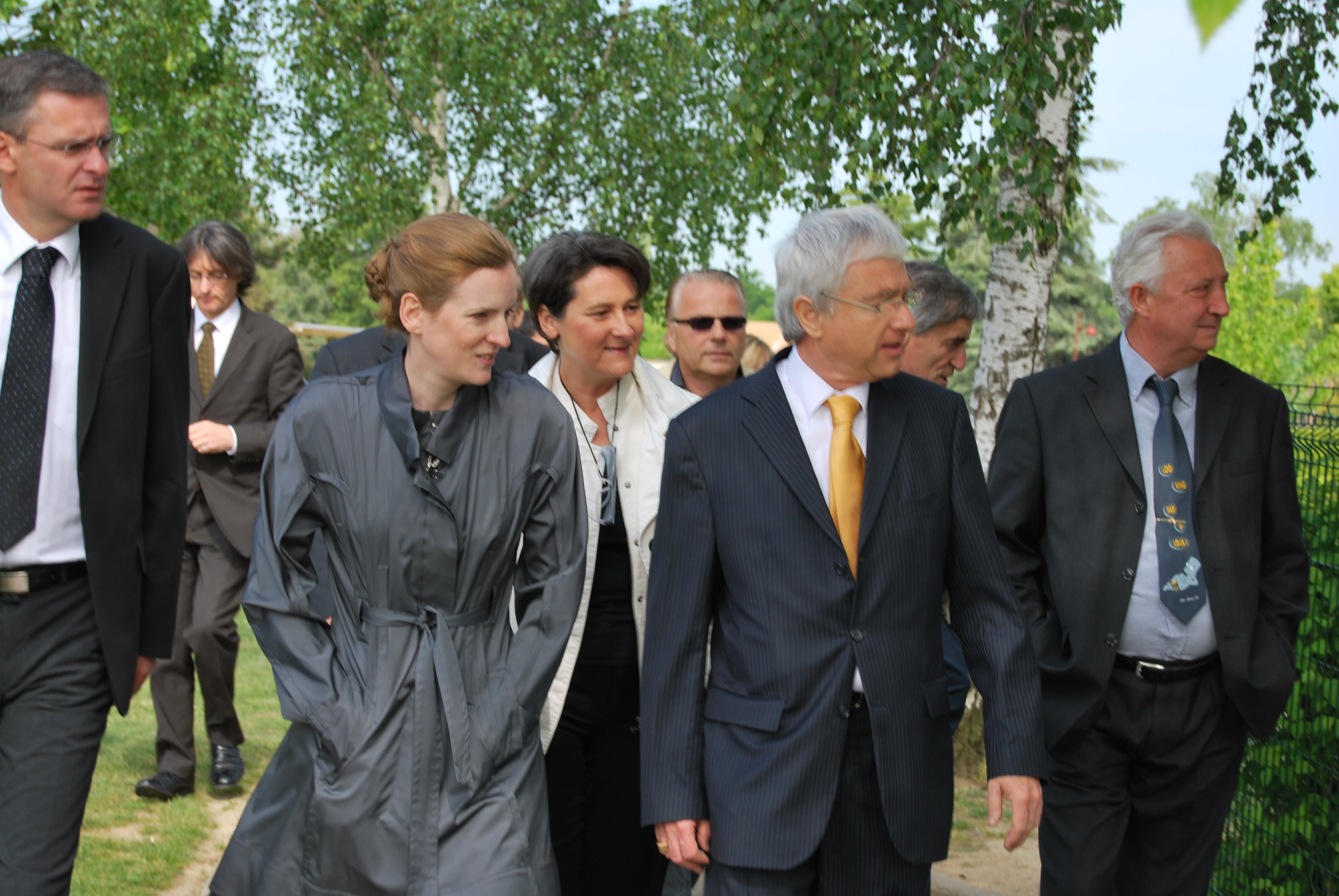
Marc Joulaud MP, Nathalie Kosciusko-Morizet Secretary of State, Fabienne Labrette-Ménager MP, Franck Breteau mayor, Jacky Bailly First Assistant, 18 May 2010

Finally, the last major project of the city: the new waste-water treatment plant. Since its inception, the plant treats the water for remediation of Commons' s Étival-lès-le-Mans and Saint-Georges-du-Bois. Reached saturation, and not respecting the future European standards, is fully modified and effluents from below of future standards. The station was inaugurated on 19.

18: the analog television stopped broadcasting in the Loire valley, including Saint-Georges-du-Bois. Nathalie Kosciusko-Morizet, [Secretary of State for Forward Planning and Development of the Digital economy, after visiting the call center of All Digital located in Le Mans, came to Saint-Georges-du-Bois to see concrete actions. Saint-Georges-du-Bois was chosen by the Minister for the actions that the municipality has implemented to help the elderly or those having trouble with the Télévision numérique terrestre française (TNT).

=== Intercommunalities ===
The town is part of:

- The communauté de communes du Bocage Cénomans CCBC (Community of Communes du Bocage Cenomani)
- The SIVOM des Hayes Assainissement (SIVOM Hayes Sanitation) created with Étival-lès-le-Mans to manage the inter-municipal sewage treatment plant
- The Syndicat du Parc de la Rivière (Union River Park) created with Étival-lès-le-Mans to manage the water of the river, created pm 26 February 2009
- The Syndicat des eaux de la région mancelle SIDERM (Union waters of the Le Mans region).

And via the CCBC:

- The Pays du Mans (Joint Union of the Le Mans region)
- The SDIREM Syndicat mixte du schéma directeur de la Région mancelle (Joint Association of the Master Plan of the Le Mans Region)
- The Syndicat mixte pour le Stationnement des Gens du Voyage de la Région Mancelle (Joint Association for the parking of Travellers of Mancelle Region)
- The Syndicat mixte des Portes Cénomanes (CDR) (Joint Union Entries to Cénomanes (CRD)
- The Syndicat de l'Orne champenoise (Union for Orne champenoise),
- L'association Ceinture verte (Green Belt Association),
- The Permanence d'accueil, d'information et d'orientation (PAIO) (Office of hospitality, information and guidance).

Since 31 May 2008, an inter-commission (between Saint-Georges-du-Bois and Étival-lès-le-Mans) is working on all areas of collaboration between the two towns, with the only rule enacted by the mayors at its foundation: "Do you suppress anything, do not limit your suggestions, or your thoughts."

=== Judicial and administrative bodies ===
There are no judicial or administrative authorities in the town.

But in Le Mans, there is a High Court, a Labor Court, a Business Court at Allonnes, a house of justice and law and Angers in the French Court of Appeal.

=== National competition of towns and villages ===
Following a national competition organized by the Association of Mayors of France and Dexia, on 16 June 1998, the town was awarded a trophy for quality of the renovation of its rectory. In very poor condition, its destruction was even proposed, but Building Services of France refused in October 1994. The renovated rectory was dedicated on 22 September 1996 by M. François Fillon, Deputy Minister for Post, Telecommunications and Space.

=== Road safety trophy ===
On 20 September 2006, the ACO (Automobile Club of the West) presented the road safety trophy to the town for the accommodations made over CD 309: chicanes, speed bumps, pedestrian pathways and crosswalks.

=== Grand prize for sustainable development ===
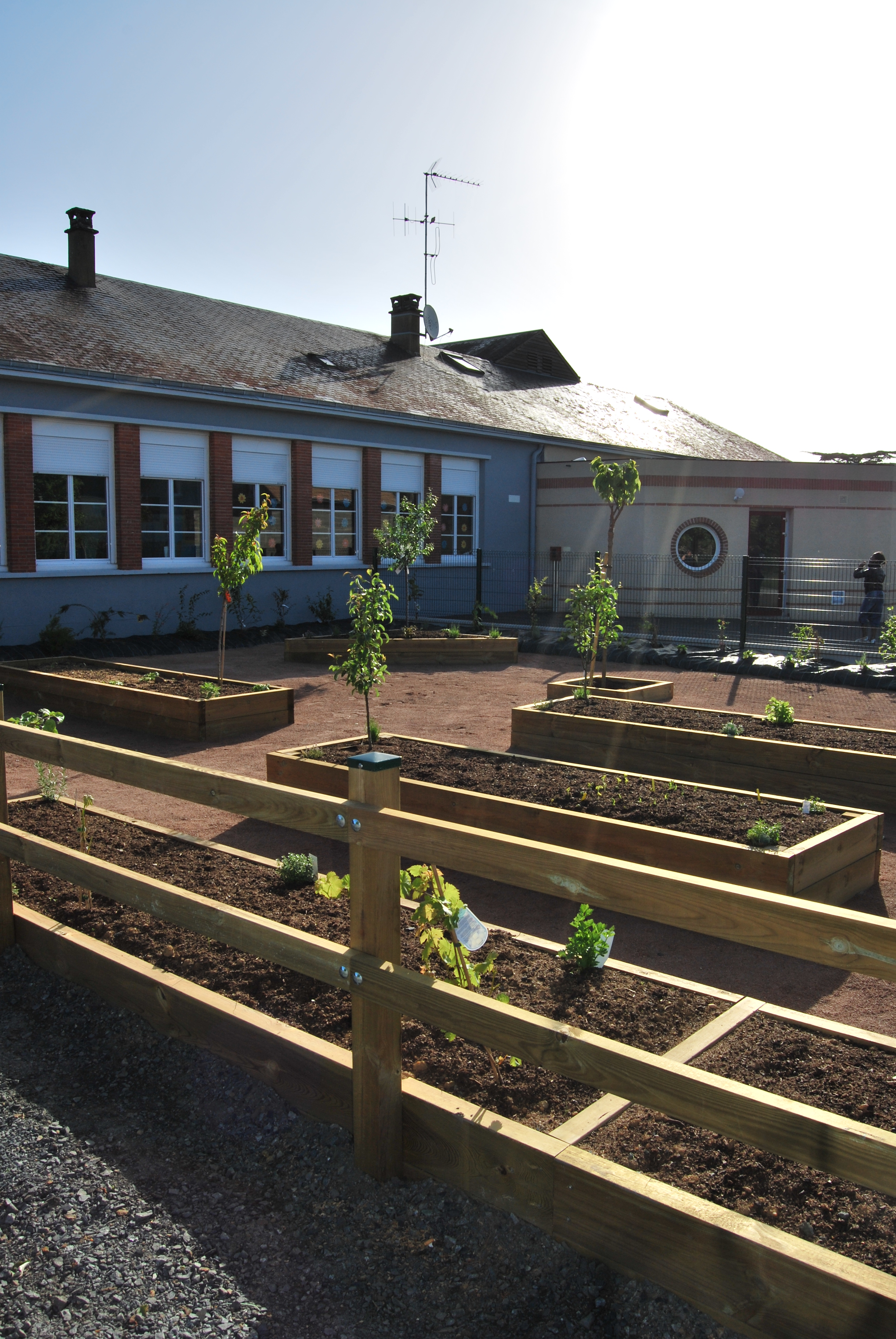
Educational Garden at Saint-Georges-du-Bois school

The General Council of Sarthe organizes the annual Grand Prize of sustainable development. The theme for 2009 was the rational management of water. Saint-Georges-du-Bois applied citing the new educational garden of the school. The project of the town was awarded 2nd prize in the "local" category with the project "Awareness program for children in water conservation. Creating an educational garden at the school, following the construction of the new school cafeteria (two citations HQE). The gardens are watered with rainwater. Each child is responsible for a block of the garden."

=== Sister cities ===
- Saint Bartholoma since March 2001. In March 1990, after the deposition of Nicolae Ceausescu, a Sister City committee was created as a project to be a sister city with a Romanian village. This project did not succeed.

In September 1998, a boisgeorgienne delegation was received by Saint Bartholoma. Then, in March 2001, the municipalities of Saint-Georges-du-Bois and Saint Bartholoma region of Styria near Austria formalized their relationship. After some discussion, the sister city committee is now dormant.

== People and society ==
=== Demographics ===
The population of Saint-Georges-du-Bois stagnated for decades. Lack of clean water is probably the reason as it can be noted that the increase in population comes with the arrival of the so-called water on the town in 1956. The population then exploded in the 1970s, with the creation of numerous subdivisions south of the town (Bideaudière, Croix Sainte-Apolline, Jardin de la Petite Pièce, l'Écoté) and north of the town (Panorama, Pré de la Vigne, Pré du Pain). The recent creation of new subdivisions (Bassetin, Clos des Cèdres) barely makes up for the departure of the children from earlier subdivisions. Parc des Hayes (ongoing since 2008) should reverse this trend (over 140 lots, rental houses, apartments) and restarting the upwardly mobile population.

==== Demographic trends 1793–2017 ====
Residents are called Boisgeorgiens in French. The population was stagnant until the mid-1960s, with less than 500 inhabitants. The arrival of the drinking water network in 1956 has allowed new home construction and the town to expand.

Historical population

Year	Pop.	±% p.a.
1793	219	—
1800	386	+8.43%
1806	381	−0.22%
1821	475	+1.48%
1831	420	−1.22%
1836	556	+5.77%
1841	590	+1.19%
1846	639	+1.61%
1851	613	−0.83%
1856	600	−0.43%
1861	595	−0.17%
1866	536	−2.07%
1872	547	+0.34%

Year	Pop.	±% p.a.
1876	526	−0.97%
1881	527	+0.04%
1886	537	+0.38%
1891	503	−1.30%
1896	501	−0.08%
1901	484	−0.69%
1906	475	−0.37%
1911	468	−0.30%
1921	395	−1.68%
1926	421	+1.28%
1931	391	−1.47%
1936	400	+0.46%
1946	437	+0.89%

Year	Pop.	±% p.a.
1954	499	+1.67%
1962	593	+2.18%
1968	578	−0.43%
1975	782	+4.41%
1982	1,284	+7.34%
1990	1,625	+2.99%
1999	1,762	+0.90%
2007	1,783	+0.15%
2012	1,934	+1.64%
2017	2,121	+1.86%
2023	2,285	+1.25%

Source: EHESS and INSEE

=== Education ===
Saint-Georges-du-Bois is located in the Academy of Nantes.

==== Schools ====
A public school (for boys only) existed in Saint-Georges-du-Bois before 1849, as shown in accounts of local councils. Due to weak finances, the municipality leased space until 1862, when a grant from the Department of Public Instruction allowed the purchase of the school building.

Following the Falloux Laws, the town opened, in a rented house, a public girls' school in 1852, although this was not mandatory. It moves to a new location in 1866, then in 1882, the municipality launched a project to build a school for girls, at 26 rue de Sable. Finances slowed the project, which was completed in 1889. The school has grown from one floor in 1952.

The town went even further in 1882 by introducing classes for adults.

The school was available, but not free, at least until 1877, the date of refusal of the council to follow the request of the prefect of making the schools free.

In 1946, a school cafeteria was created in Hotel Martineau (probably the current café), then in 1953, a municipal school cafeteria was set up for 30 children.

The oldest part of the existing nursery school dates from 1951 and has grown since 1952 to have a third class. The new part was built in 1976, and extended the central heating into the old part.

The sports field created in 1958 and enlarged 1960.

There were big changes in 1981: the construction of a primary school with six classes used to group boys and girls in suitable, dedicated premises. The boys' school was also used for the town hall, and the girls' school was very small. The girls' school then served as home to the school principal, then in 1986 to the extended day program.

Thanks to a strong commitment from the Community of Municipalities Bocage Cenomani, the schools are computerized. Thus, for Saint-Georges-du-Bois, there are 23 computers (for 170 students).

In May 2003, following a request by the school council, the school was named: Groupe scolaire Trompe-Souris (named after an old farmhouse near school).

After four years of study, the new cafeteria was built according to HQE standards, and was to be dedicated by Mr. François Fillon (Prime Minister), on 13 October 2007.

The old cafeteria, released and renovated, since May 2007 houses the extended day program and the library since January 2011.

The school board is decorated with large frescoes. Created by Typhaine and Anne of the cooperative 'Clés en main 72' (Turnkey 72) in 2008 and 2009. They depict the theme linked to the name of the school group: Trompe-Souris.

Since the beginning of 2012, the town is exploring the possibility of remodeling the primary school. Indeed, built in 1981, the thermal insulation is very poor (or non-existent), the roof is leaking in many places, the classrooms are too small, and the storage spaces are too small. Also, after several meetings with parents and teachers to discover the requirements, the town is working with a research firm on three possibilities: building a new school and destruction of the present school, enlargement of the school and renovation of the current building, or just the renovation of the current building. For these three choices, the price criterion is not decisive because all three projects are about the same price: around EUR 2 million.

=== Cultural celebrations and events ===
Saint-Georges-du-Bois is no longer the head of communal celebrations for several years, even decades. However, there is a story about a festival.

In 1841, two annual festivals enlivened the small town of St. George: one was on Sunday after St. George's day (23 April), the second on Sunday after St. Apollonia (9 February). Then, in February 1873, the City Council adopted the creation of a new congregation on the Sunday after 7 Sep, but the mystery remains for the choice of this date. This assembly was moved to the 4th Sunday of September in February 1875 to spread the festive dates between neighboring municipalities.

Since 24 May 1959, the welfare office became Centre communal d'action sociale (Municipal Social Welfare Centre), was organizing a meal for the aged Since this meal for the aged was held the first Sunday after Saint George's da. It was offered each year to all Boisgeorgiens over 65 years of age.

Other firsts:

- First illumination of town for the holiday season in December 1965
- First contest of home gardens in July 1978
- The first and only presence of the Tour de France on 6 July 1984
- First agricultural show held in 1988,
- First Christmas concert offered to residents in December 1995. On 16 December 2012 the 18th concert was held.
- First fireworks, together with Étival-lès-le-Mans, on 13 July 2009. The fourth display was held on 13 July 2012.

Each year the Fédération des conseils de parents d'élèves (Local Council of Parents) organized on the first Saturday of the spring a carnival for children and parents alike, filling the town with music, parade floats, and other amusements. The finale takes place on the school grounds and includes the lighting of a bonfire.

=== Health ===
Saint-Georges-du-Bois for many years has had a health outreach. Even in 1878, the town had established a commission of charity to help the needy. In 1895, a medical assistance service which is transformed into charity office in 1911.

A medical office was established in 1982, with three general practitioners. It was rebuilt in 2001 and includes three GPs, a physiotherapist/osteopath, a dentist, and a podiatrist / chiropodist. The departure and arrival of two general practitioners was planned for the end of first half of 2012. The pharmacy, attached to the medical office, is located in the town since 1983, and was expanded in 2001.

For other health services (hospitals, clinics, specialty hospitals ...), on must go to the Le Mans located within 10 kilometres (6.2 mi).

In addition, an outreach office of ADAPEI (Association departmental assistance for handicapped children) (Foyer des Cèdres), for people with mental disabilities, was opened in the town on 25 October 2005. It hosts 25 disabled people. Nursing facilities are available. This home was opened by Marc Joulaud (MP), Marcel-Pierre Cleach (Senator), and Yvon Luby (General Counsel of the Sarthe). Finally, a project to install a home for the elderly is underway. After several private projects were canceled since November 1989, a public project supported by Sarthe-Habitat was being considered as of May 2012.

=== Sports ===
Excellent sports facilities are in place for schools.

In 1958, the village installed a sports field on a space adjacent to the schools, the field was expanded in March 1960. But it took more than ten years until in November 1969, before trying to create a sports club. A project to create a soccer field with the municipalities of Pruillé-Chétif and Rouillon was conceived with the aim of using the sports field grass. The club was started in January 1970, but with the villages of Étival-lès-le-Mans and Fay. This sports association would survive almost six years until October 1975, when Étival-lès-le-Mans decided to create its own soccer field. However, the Soccer club is still called today 'Entente sportive Saint-Georges-du-Bois.

In September 1978, the village moved by 500 metres (1,600 ft), the football field to its current location, then in September 1980, added prefabricated changing rooms for the soccer club, remodeled in June 1990. In July 1988, a complete soccer training field with equipment was completed. It was refurbished in May 1993. The club has, since February 2004 moved to more spacious and brighter locker rooms, the old locker rooms are no used for storing old equipment and the snack bar.

The former soccer field was then redeveloped for playing school sports: a track, long jump and high jump pits, and a handball court. In May 1994, the Fédération Française de Basket-Ball provided backboards to complete the school equipment. The track was used for several years by a roller skate sports club.

In June 1982, two tennis courts were constructed next to the soccer field. Détente Loisir Plein Air (Relaxing Outdoor Recreation), a multi-activity organization of the town, then created a tennis group. This group was dissolved in March 1987 to create a new association dedicated to this sport: "Tennis Club de Saint-Georges-du-Bois". It was also during this period that a local installed courts near the sports field for tennis players.

The village does not have a mult-purpose room for the practice of indoor sports. However, a building project near the soccer field project was being considered in June 1985, but was abandoned because the costs were too high for local finances. Similar projects were also planned in November 1986 and November 1993 with the same result.

In June 1990, a recreation area began emerging around the soccer fields including a BMX track and a large bowling green. The track was converted into a BMX track in June 1999. Finally, each neighborhood (or so) has a bowling green. To date, seven smaller field and three multi-use fields are available that regularly come alive.

==== Sports clubs ====
Lacking a sports hall, the range of practical sports in Saint-Georges-du-Bois is necessarily reduced. Here's the list:

- circus school (wire walking, ball, stilts, juggling) by 'les p'tits loups' (Wolf Cubs) in the community hall
- Soccer by "Entente Sportive Saint-Georges-du-Bois" on two soccer fields – the first team plays in the second departmental division,
- Aerobics by "Saint-Georges Bien Être" in community hall
- Jazz dance by "Familles rurales" in community hall
- Hiking by "Détente Loisir Plein Air" (DLPA) on the many hiking trails in the region,
- Step aerobics by "Familles rurales" in community hall
- Tennis by the "Tennis Club de Saint-Georges-du-Bois" on the two tennis courts.

=== Media ===
One newspaper is directly associated with the town, bulletin municipal (news bulletin).

It was printed for some time as a quarterly since May 1977. Stopped for a few years, it appeared first in black and white and quarterly from June 1995. It was switched to color January 2000. The latest copies are available on the website of la Communauté de Communes du Bocage Cénomans.

The legal deposit is in the municipal library of Angers.

=== Religions ===
The only religion practiced in the town is the Catholic faith with one church and the cemetery.

== Economy ==
=== Income and taxes ===
In 2017, median household income was €23,320. 64% of households are taxed on income.

=== Jobs ===
In 2017, the total active population of the village was 941 inhabitants. The unemployment rate was 4.4%, which is much lower than the national average (10.3%). There were 10.5% retired, 9.6% of young people in school and 4.1% of people without activity.

=== Businesses and shops ===
On 31 December 2015, 80 companies were based in the town, including four industrial, five construction, 50 commercial, and 17 public service. These enterprises employed (as of 31 December 2015) 136 people (of which 75 are inhabitants).

Furthermore, the curve for farmers follows the national curve. There were twenty-seven farms in 1988, which dropped to nine in 2008 a decrease of 67%. And the decline is likely to continue because 25% of farmers are 55 years or older.

Side trade has had, since 2006, an increase of retailers and now includes a bakery/chocolate shop, a bar tabac presse, a beauty salon, a bar, a restaurant, a hairdresser and a supermarket with 700 square metres (7,500 ft^{2}) including a service station. Finally, late each Wednesday afternoon, the village offerings are diversified with a small farmers' market. Currently comprising a pizzeria, a deli, a vegetable stall and a cheese merchant since 2011.

== Local culture and heritage ==
=== Places and monuments ===
Numerous archival documents speak of a royal abbey of Saint-Georges-du-Bois in Sarthe. In fact this abbey does not concern this village but Saint-Martin-des-Bois in Loir et Cher.

There is also mention of a priory at a place called Le Grand Beauvais (47°59′11.23″N 0°05′42.15″E), but it seems that it was more of a lordship. No further information has yet been found.

==== Church ====
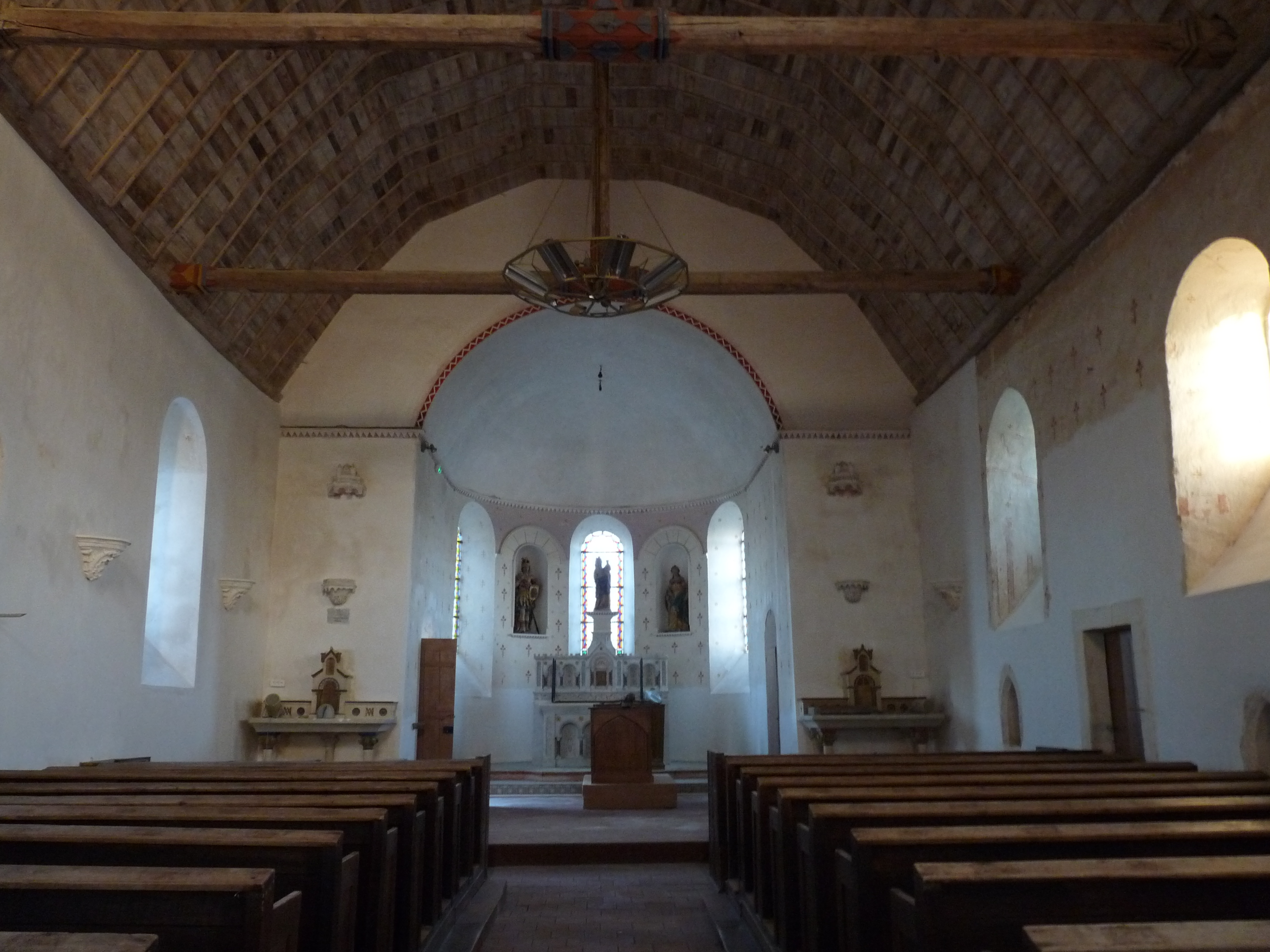
The choir of the church.

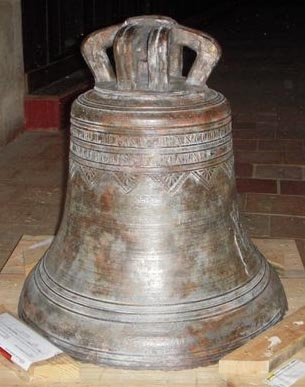
The bell Françoise Julienne.

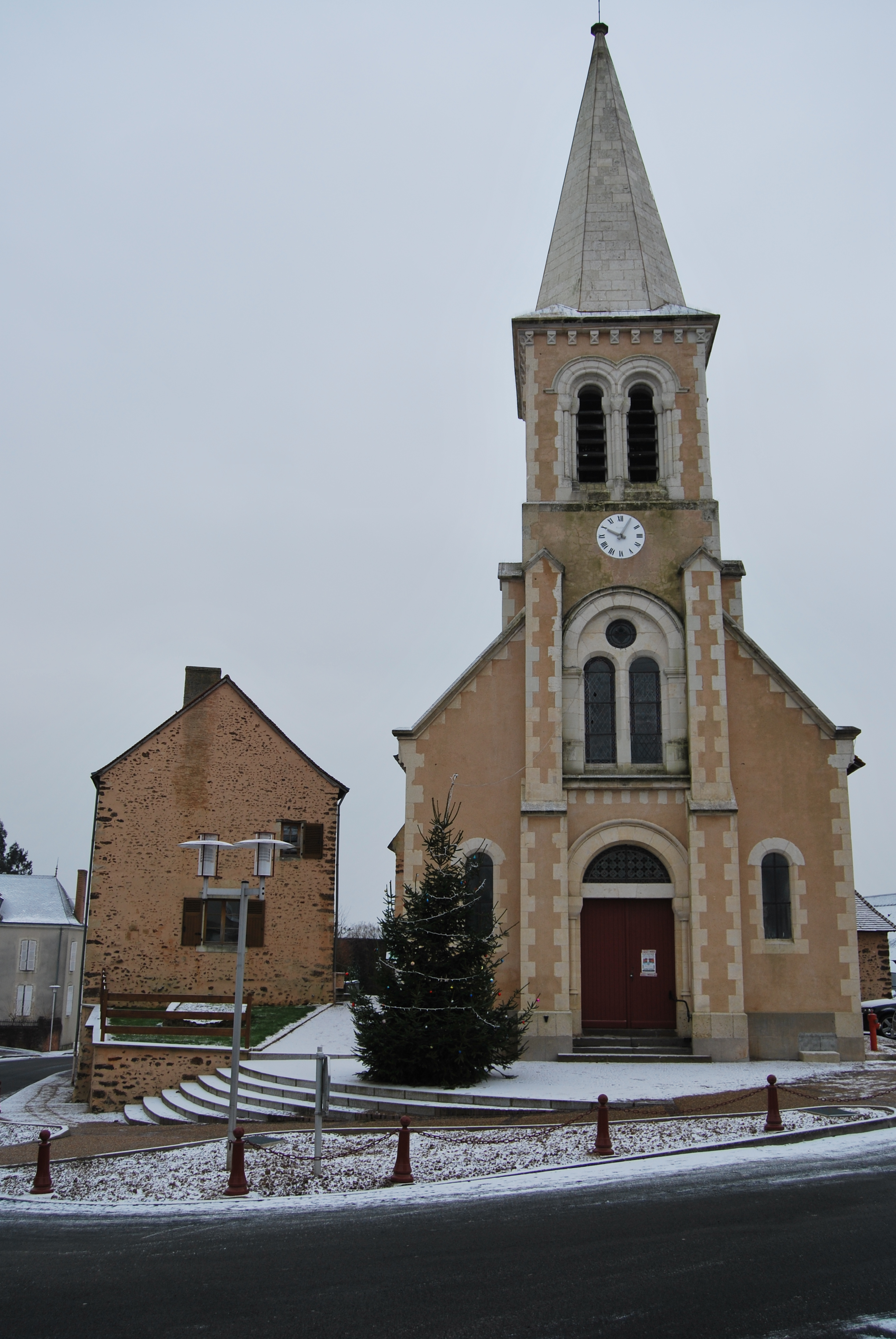
Exterior view of the church and rectory.

The church as built in the fourteenth century and fifteenth century, and enlarged in the mid-nineteenth century. It was under the [Abbey of Saint-Julien du Pré in Le Mans, which, it seems, also has a priory in the town.

The walls are stone and limestone, while the roof is covered with small flat tiles. Currently undergoing renovation, traces of paint from the sixteenth century were recently discovered under many layers of paint applied over the centuries. The interior is white plaster, decorated with fleur-de-lis in brick color, while the ceiling is oak plank.

The next phase of the renovation addresses stained glass. The village has chosen a particular operation for this: the church had eight white glass windows, to be replaced with real stained glass. With the support of the General Council, Boisgeorgiens were to choose the new windows that will ornament the church. The secret ballot was held on 11 March 2010 and the windows of Marie-Laure Mallet-Melchior were chosen. The old windows (in the choir) will be dismantled, refurbished and replaced by ephemeral windows during the renovation.

The church also has many statues of which is listed on the lists of historic buildings:

- Madonna and Child: This is the oldest, dating from the fourteenth century and is therefore contemporary with the construction of the church. It remains in excellent condition despite the mutilation suffered during the French Revolution. This is the only heritage listed in the town, listed as of 16 March 1976 as a historical monument.
- The Great Martyr Barbara: dates from the seventeenth century is in polychrome terracotta.
- Saint George: as the patron saint of the town, it must be present in the church. The statue dates from the seventeenth century.
- The Our Lady of Mercy: it dates from the seventeenth century, is in polychrome terracotta and has been completely restored (2009).
- St. Francis of Assisi, attributed to the sculptor Michel Chevallier Mans, dating from the first half of the seventeenth century and has been completely restored (late 2007). It is made of plaster.
- The Great Martyr Barbara: its date and origin are, at present, unknown. Awaiting renovation, it is in very poor condition.
- Saint Sebastian: dates from the seventeenth century or eighteenth century.
- Saint Stephen dates from the nineteenth century. The latter work is very heavy, suggesting that it is full, which is quite rare.
- Another statue, lost, Joan of Arc dated 1942. It was sculpted by Ernest Hiron.

Its bells are also quite old:

- The first information about the bells of the church dates from 19 August 1722, but there others. This bell was dedicated by Father Leblanc, Head Priest of the Society of the Oratory of Jesus, appointed by the Right Reverend Berhingen, Lady Abbess Pre, Anne Marie Madeleine Therese, and by Charles Tallement, parish priest of Saint-Georges-du-Bois. The research fails to show what happened to this bell.
- The Francoise Julienne bell cast in 1830, was restored in late 2008).
- The bell Renée cast in 1830.
- The bell Joan of Arc was cast in 1913. It was a gift of Father Motay offering this third bell at the church. It was dedicated, among others, by the Bishop of La Porte, bishop of Le Mans. Weighing 204 kilograms (450 lb), it was cast by Amédée Bollée on 5 August 1913.

For the furniture of the church, there are eight wooden pews from the seventeenth century, and a pew-chest dating from the eighteenth century. The history of the church does not stop there: on 18 June 1940, a German bomb severely damaged the bell tower. Since 2005, the church is under complete renovation (façades, steeple, walls, statues, stained glass). Completion was scheduled for the second half of 2010. The spire is one of two geodetic benchmarks of the village.

===== The mystery of the church =====
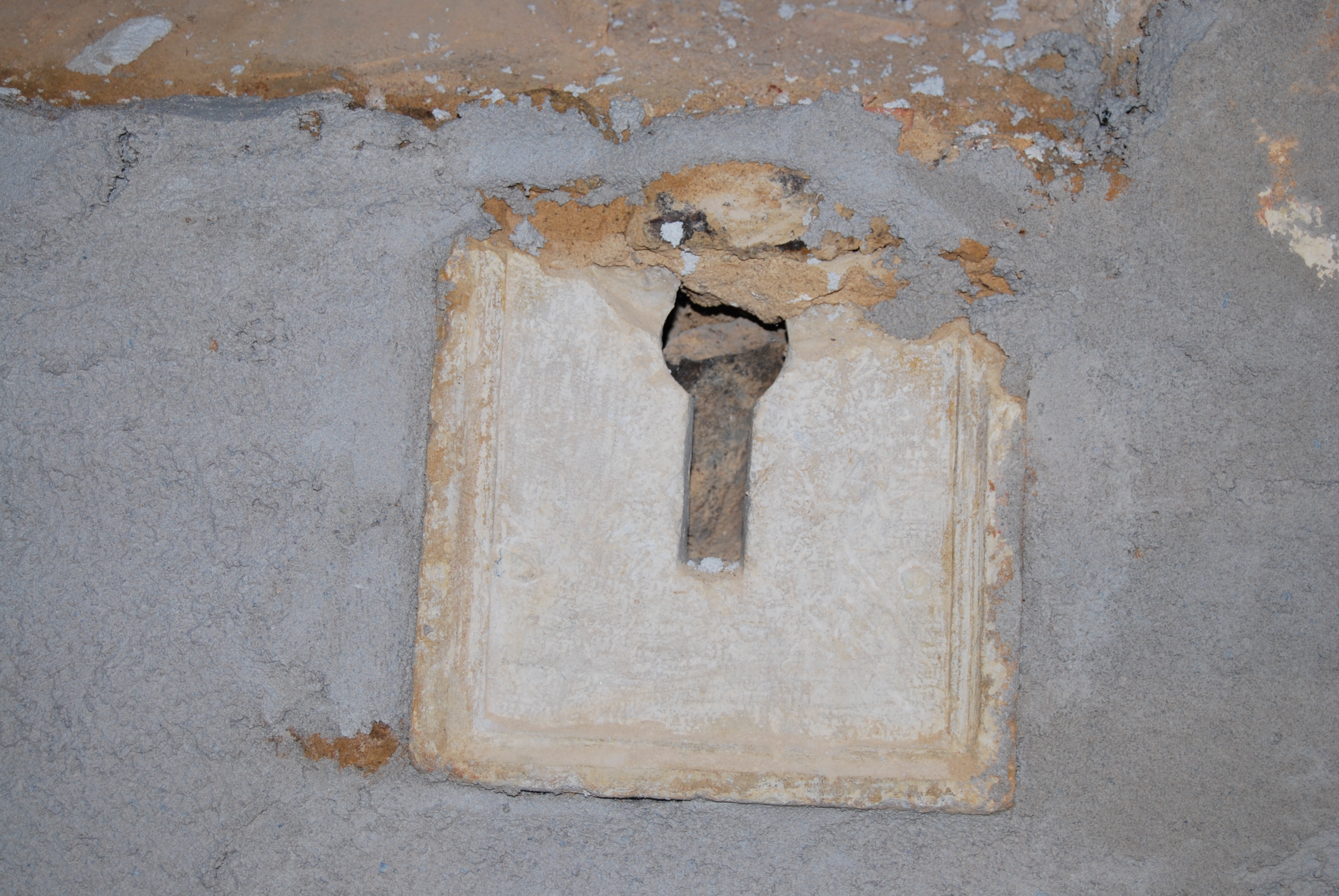
The mysterious stone of the church.

During renovations of the interior walls of the church in the fall of 2009, a discovery was made: a stone 30 square centimetres (4.7 in^{2}) with a lock-like hole at its center. Despite the research, the meaning or function of the stone remains a mystery. It seems to have been salvaged from another building, for use in the construction of the church. Small detail: it is hollow.

==== The cross of St. Apollonia ====
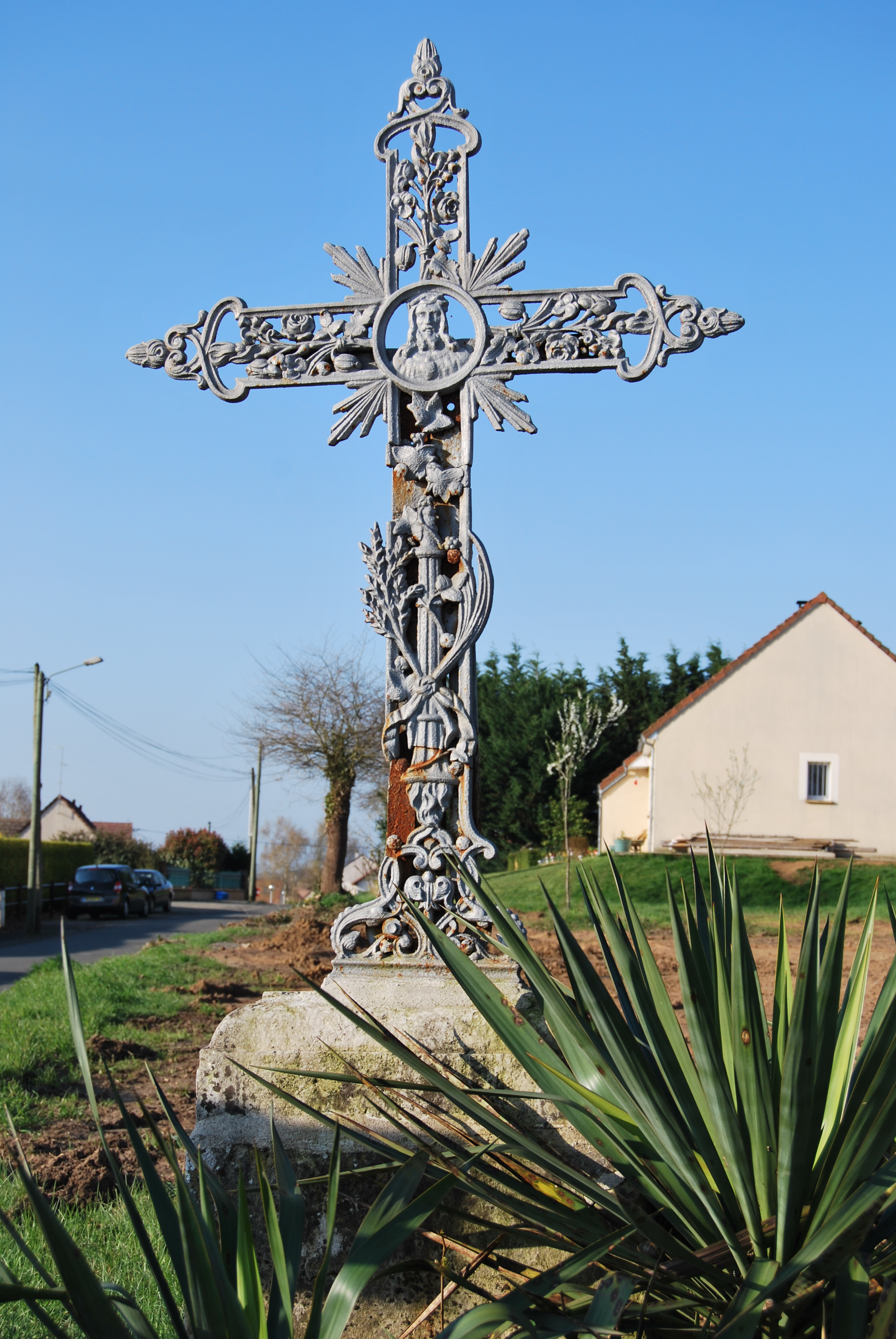
The Cross St. Apollonia.

This cross, made of wrought iron, dates from the early nineteenth century. It appears on the surveys of 1844 but its origin is unknown. It is located at the entrance of the village on the side towards Le Mans (47°58′30.30″N 0°06′22.78″E). A procession of boisgeorgiens parishioners went there once a year until the early twentieth century, probably until the Second World War.

==== Calvary (Souligné-Flacé Road) ====
Calvary is located on the road to Souligné-Flacé, outside of the town, near the subdivision of Trompe-Souris (47°58′20.28″N 0°05′36.04″E). Installed on a mound of stone and concrete, the cross measures four feet high and supports a Christ of metal. Installation seems to be fairly recent since at the back of it says: "E.Blossier – FECM – 1952"

==== The cross (Pruillé-Chétif Road) ====
This cross is on the road to Pruillé-Chétif, at the intersection of rue des Fouillées and la Grande Locherie (47°58′58.34″N 0°05′47.82″E). Made of wrought iron, with a height of about one meter, it represents a virgin praying. At its base lies a crown (honorary or mortuary?). Its origin and dating are, for the moment, unknown.

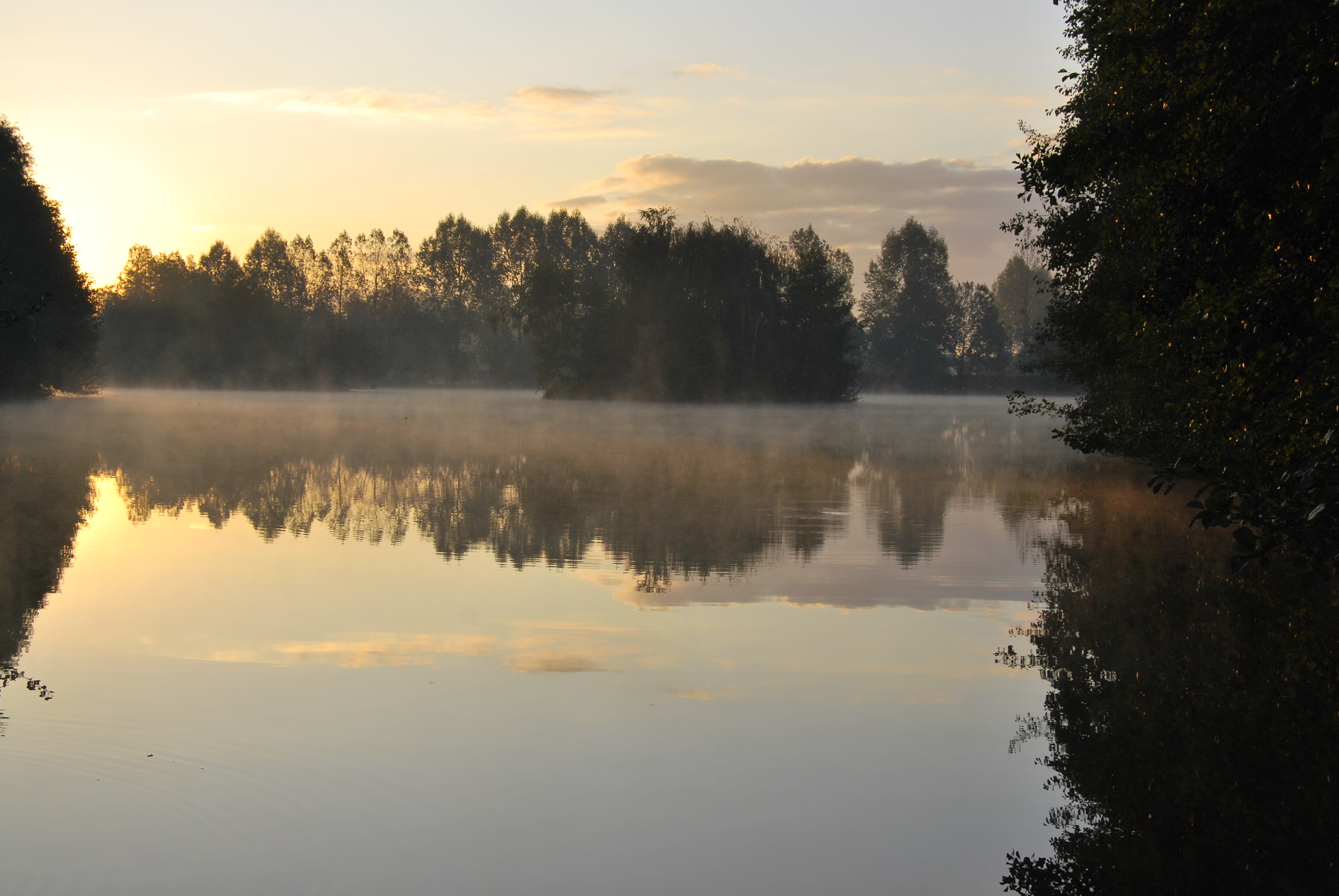
The river pool at sunrise on 2 October 2009

==== River park ====
Located on the edge of the town of Saint-Georges-du-Bois, in Étival, the park is currently limited to a pond and surrounding land. It depends on the Castle River one hundred meters away (47°57′38″N 0°05′12″E). The purchase of this pond is an old project. In the year 1995, the purchase almost happened. Then bought by someone from Brittany, who used it as a pool for his friends or for vacations, thanks to stocking it with very large fish (see below). Not until July 2008 did he decide to sell it.

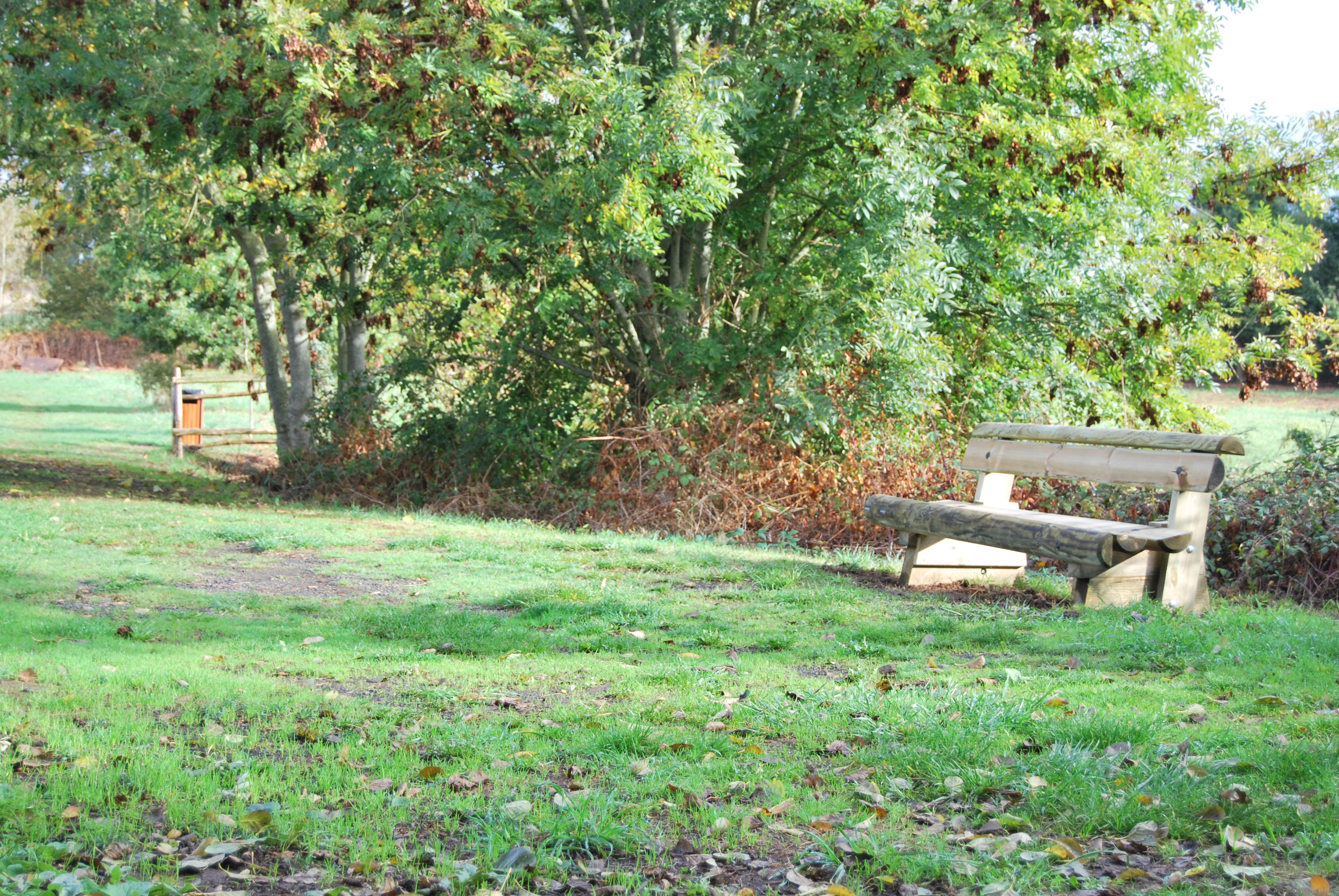
Bench on the banks of the pool of the river in October 2009

After consultation with residents of the two towns, it was purchased with the town of Étival-lès-le-Mans using Syndicat intercommunal du Parc de la Rivière, created for this purpose in February 2009. Covering an area of 2.8 ha of water and 2 ha of forest land, the initial goal was to reopen to the pond to the public, redeveloping its banks, securing access and cleaning the grounds. This is done for the grand opening on 13 July 2009 to over 1,500 people (4,000 living in the two municipalities). Since then have added parking, plenty of benches, tables, trash cans, glass collectors and games to make the most of this space for resting and walking. In 2010, Plans are to construct a fishing dock for the disabled, the planting of fruit trees, and walking paths between the two municipalities.

In the longer term (20–30 years), there are plans to build a park of thirty acres on the space between the two towns (separated by only 700 metres (2,300 ft) for sustainable development. Part of this park would be used for a positive energy habitat.

The current fishing records since the reopening to the public are 95 kilograms (209 lb) and 2.47 metres (8.1 ft) for catfish and 24 kilograms (53 lb) for carp.\

=== Industry ===
==== Water tower ====
After nine years of consideration (since April 1947), six years after participating in the creation of the Syndicat pour l'alimentation en eau potable des communes de la région du Mans (Union for the supply of drinking water to municipalities in the region of Le Mans) in September 1950, the water tower was constructed in 1956 (47°58′28.67″N 0°06′05.26″E). It marks a major turning point in the history of the town, because until then, the only source of drinking water were the fountains, which were mostly private.

The water tower, 20 metres (66 ft) high, is the only visible part of the project. In 1956 it was connected to the drinking water system, and the first 196 homes were served. It allowed the development of the town. The water tower is still in operation and is managed by the SIDERM (Syndicat des eaux de la région mancelle, Union for water of the Le Mans region). It is one of two geodetic points of the town.

==== Windmill ====
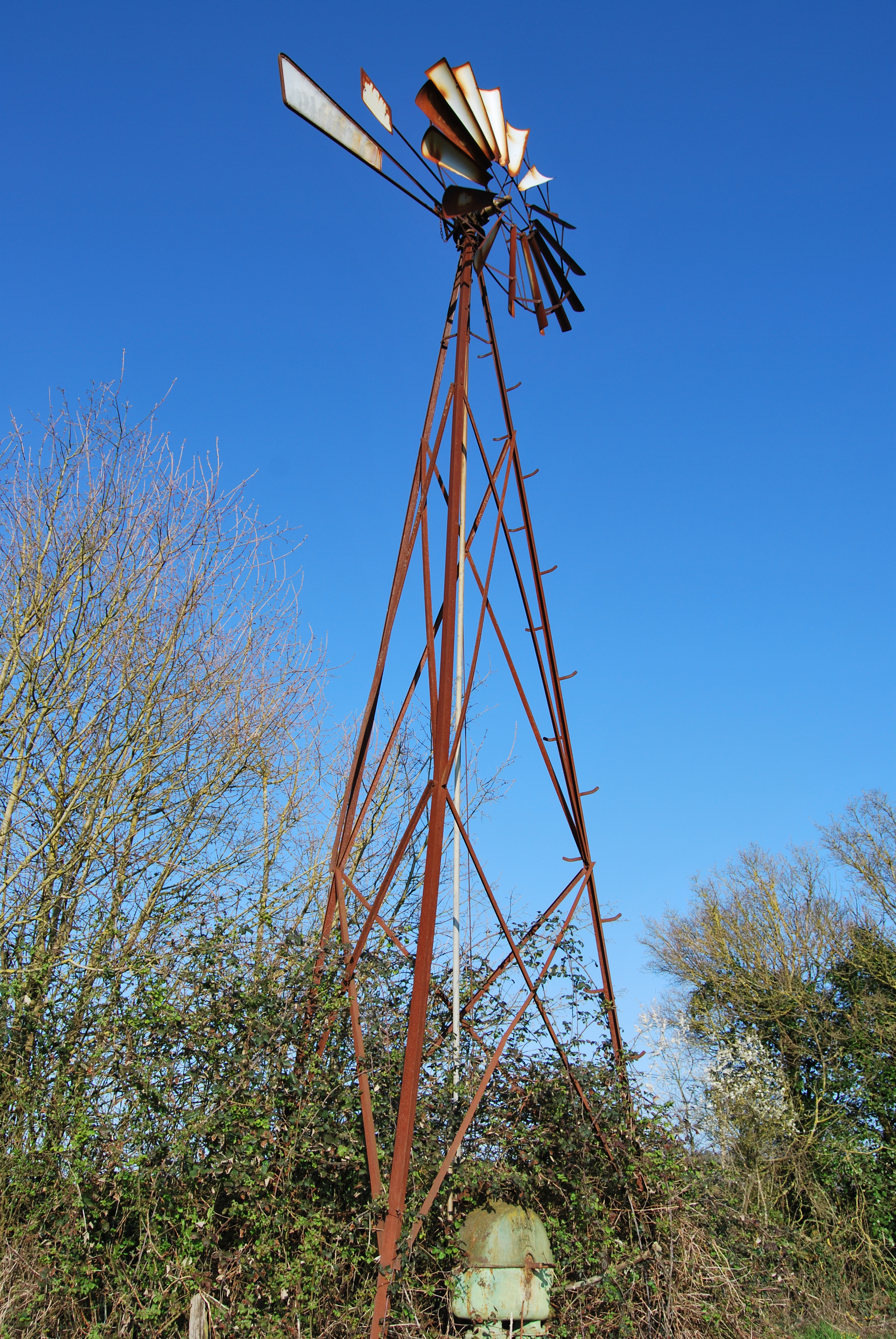
Windmill in April 2010

A former windmill is south of the town, along the country road No. 2 (road from Saint-Georges-du-Bois at the junction of cinq routes) (47°58′07.92″N 0°06′13.26″E). At a height of about 10 metres (33 ft), it is made of rusty iron. It is equipped with a hydraulic pump used to raise water from the water table nearby. The origin of this windmill is not yet determined, but the pump was manufactured by Dragor in Le Mans, which reduces the manufacture time to between 1923 and 1959. As for the windmill, it seems (the painton the blades being very damaged) to be branded Le Mistral.

The council is considering renovation and development of the ancient windmill located at the edge of a reserved area to create a walking path.

==== Cell tower ====
A cell tower for mobile phones is found to the west of the town, on the municipal site Blanchardière (47°57′48.12″N 0°05′24.84″E). Two antennas were initially scheduled for June 2000 at the request of Bouygues Telecom, but the project was reduced to a single antenna in November 2000. The tower measures 44 metres (144 ft) high. Three suppliers currently operate this antenna:

- Since 24 November 2000, Bouygues Telecom, ID number: 200038
- Since 21 October 2011, Free Mobile ID number: 780256
- Since 3 December 2004 Société Française du Radiotéléphone (SFR), ID number: 360229

Information about the cell tower is found on the website of the ANFR (Agence nationale des fréquences) with the identifications number 731,062.

==== Seven fountains ====
The seven fountains represent a large part of the history of Saint-Georges-du-Bois (47°58′18.27″N 0°05′55.91″E). Indeed, until 1956 and the arrival of clean drinking water, this network was the only source of water for Boisgeorgiens. And it was not easy to have a fountain in the town as there were several fatal accidents due to landslides that occurred during the excavations.

Before the fountains, there were since ancient times, three small ponds that collect the seeping water. Only in the early nineteenth century, a pool was reserved (walled and gated with a door) to representatives of the hospice Savigné-l'Évêque, owner of the adjoining land. A second was filled by a landslide. This left only one pool for about 500 people.

Work was carried out in 1814 to transform the second fountain basin. This fountain, privately owned, was bought by the town in order to make the first public fountain. In 1894, a fountain was initially created for the exclusive use of the priest and the teachers and all other employees.

Since then, the town gradually bought all the fountains in order to develop them. The acquisition of three fountains in October 2007, bringing to five the number of purchased fountains.

Another well is located at the rear of the church. Originally reserved for the clergy and teachers, it was widened in 1830. To give an idea of the risks at the time to dig a well in the sand and clay: It is 28.4 metres (93 ft), the water table being 25.5 metres (84 ft) from the surface. This has not been used since 1951.

=== Cultural heritage ===
==== Library ====
The first information on the creation of a library in Saint-Georges-du-Bois dates to August 1862. But budgets are so swallowed up by the work of the church and school management that council refused to authorize it.

There is no other information about a library for more than 100 years. It was only in November 1973 that we learn from the minutes of the city council that the library was going to be a reality. Thanks to the remodeling of the Town Hall, which opened on 13 March 1993, the library was able to be created. The ground floor of the Town Hall, originally planned as a meeting room and for local youth meetings, housed the library. Following an agreement signed with the General Council of Sarthe to create a repository of the county library, the organization was created in April 1997 to manage it. The opening took place after a few weeks of work and setting up on 4 October 1997.

A second library is in town, but is reserved for students in kindergarten. It opened in May 1999.

==== Hiking trails ====
The paths in the town have history going way back. Indeed, the first path is created in 1892: This is the Path of Fountains (now rue des Fontaines). Many others followed, crisscrossing the woods. Today, the idea is to link each farm to all its neighbors, or from a farm to the village directly.

For about thirty years (until World War I), many paths were created, whether communal or private. The arrival of cars and asphalt most of the paths obsolete, which are forgotten and in brambles. Also, between 1962 and 1975, a lot of the paths were symbolically sold to adjacent landowners.

Then came another use for paths: hiking.

The start of this hobby in Saint-Georges-du-Bois, dates from May 1976 with the request to M. Lorillier to create footpaths. Détente loisirs Plein Air (DLPA) (Relaxing Outdoor Recreation) was then formed whose primary purpose was the maintenance of these paths. In September 1992, the path of Bel Air was transferred to the hiking departmental plan.

Since then, three circuits 9.5 kilometres (5.9 mi), 3.5 kilometres (2.2 mi) and 3.5 kilometres (2.2 mi) wander through the countryside. Starting from the town hall, they take old country roads to traverse woods, sunken roads (sometimes lower by several meters), woods, views and history of the town. All of these paths are interconnected with the footpaths of Pruillé-Chétif, adding 28 kilometres (17 mi) to the paths.

Two other projects are in progress or planned:

- A greenbelt to go around the town almost exclusively by hiking trails. Missing two portions of 700 metres (2,300 ft) to complete this belt which will then be 7.5 kilometres (4.7 mi).
- A path connecting the village to the lake of the river. With a length of 800 metres (2,600 ft), it will fork at an existing path and allow for interconnection to over 10 kilometres (6.2 mi) of paths at Étival-lès-le-Mans.
- Planned for 2014, access to greenbelt of Le Mans will come to town and connect with walking paths.

Ironically: the paths given away 40 years ago must be repurchased.

=== Personalities linked to the town ===
==== Charles VI ====
One of the major events in the history of France is the folly of Charles VI of France.

This madness started in 1392, in the forest of Le Mans. This forest is now almost completely gone. The historian fr:Julien Remy Pesche has no doubt that this forest was west of Le Mans. Indeed, numerous localities confirm this hypothesis by name. Charles VI was to go to Brittany. Beginning at Le Mans, he went through Saint-Georges-du-Plain, la Croix Georgette then Teillais woods. This place still exists on the edge of Saint-Georges-du-Bois and Alonnes, but another also exists between Saint-Georges-du-Bois and Souligné-Flacé. It is relatively certain from JR Pesche, that the King had lost his mind in the area, very close to Saint-Georges-du-Bois.

==== Reyol ====
Reyol, "the thief of souls of Saint-Georges-du-Bois".

Reyol, who inverted his birth name Guy Loyer, is a painter, born in Le Mans on 19 January 1939. After attending, from age 6, art classes, then attending Le Mans Graduate School of Fine Arts, Reyol had his first exhibition in 1958–1959 in Le Mans.

His paintings all have a very special story. He likes to photograph an expression, an emotion and then created his paintings in his studio at home. His main subjects are women, villages, but also memories of traveling around the world: Europe, Morocco, Russia, Thailand, China or recently in Brazil and Bolivia. His artistic identity makes use of warm colors: orange, yellow, ocher, and cold blue, gray.

Exhibiting in France and abroad (including New York or Ghent) Reyol sold to date 1,500 paintings which earned him an international reputation. Many books, French and foreign, discuss his work.

=== Sources ===
- Archives of Saint-Georges-du-Bois (before 1903) – Departmental archives of Sarthe preserved on microfilm in the series 156.
- Archives of Saint-Georges-du-Bois (since 1903) – Preserved in the archives of the Town Hall.
- Proceedings of municipal councils (since 1903) – Preserved in the archives of the Town Hall.

=== Bibliography ===
- Cauvin, Thomas (1991) [1833]. Le Mans et ses environs [Le Mans and its surroundings] (in French). Paris: Res Universis. ISBN 978-2-87760-590-8.
- Cauvin, Thomas (1834). Essai sur la statistique du département de la Sarthe [Essay on the statistics of Sarthe] (in French). Paris: Res Universis. ISBN 978-2-7428-0082-7.
- Pesche, Julien Rémy (1842). Dictionnaire topographique, historique et statistique de la Sarthe [Topographical, Historical and Statistical Dictionary of Sarthe] (in French). Floch. ISBN 978-1-144-06937-5.
- Vallée, Jean (1890). Géographie-Atlas du Département de la Sarthe [Geographical Atlas of the Department of Sarthe] (in French).
- Flohic, Jean-Luc (2000). Le Patrimoine des Communes de la Sarthe [Heritage of the Communes of Sarthe] (in French). Paris: FLOHIC éditions. ISBN 978-2-84234-106-0.
