= Étival =

Étival may refer to several communes in France:

- Étival, Jura, in the Jura department
- Étival-Clairefontaine, in the Vosges department
- Étival-lès-le-Mans, in the Sarthe department
