= Trangé =

- Commune
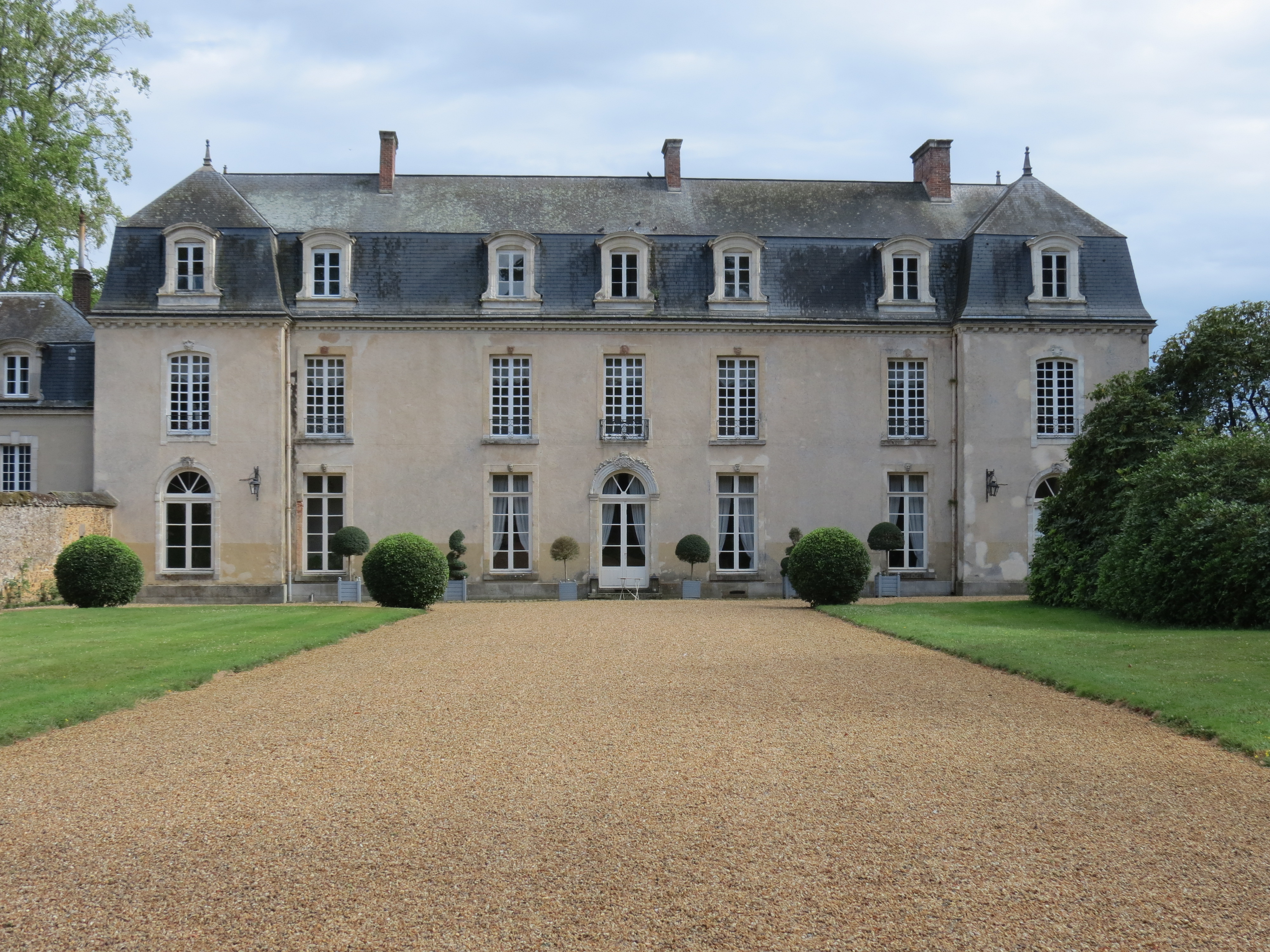
- The château of la Groirie
- Location of Trangé
- Location within France Location within Pays de la Loire
- Coordinates: 48°01′39″N 0°06′43″E
- Country: France
- Region: Pays de la Loire
- Department: Sarthe
- Arrondissement: Le Mans
- Canton: Le Mans-7
- Intercommunality: Le Mans Métropole

Government
  - Mayor (2020–2026): Jacky Marchand
- Area^{1}: 11.11 km^{2} (4.29 sq mi)
- Highest elevation: 129 m (423 ft)
- Lowest elevation: 57 m (187 ft)
- Population (2023): 1,637
  - Density: 147.3/km^{2} (381.6/sq mi)
- Demonym(s): Trangéens, Trangéenne
- Time zone: UTC+01:00 (CET)
  - Summer (DST): UTC+02:00 (CEST)
- INSEE/Postal code: 72360 /72650
- ^{1} French Land Register data, which excludes lakes, ponds, glaciers > 1 km^{2} (0.386 sq mi or 247 acres) and river estuaries.

Trangé (French pronunciation: [tʁɑ̃ʒe]) is a commune in the Sarthe department in the region of Pays de la Loire in northwestern France.

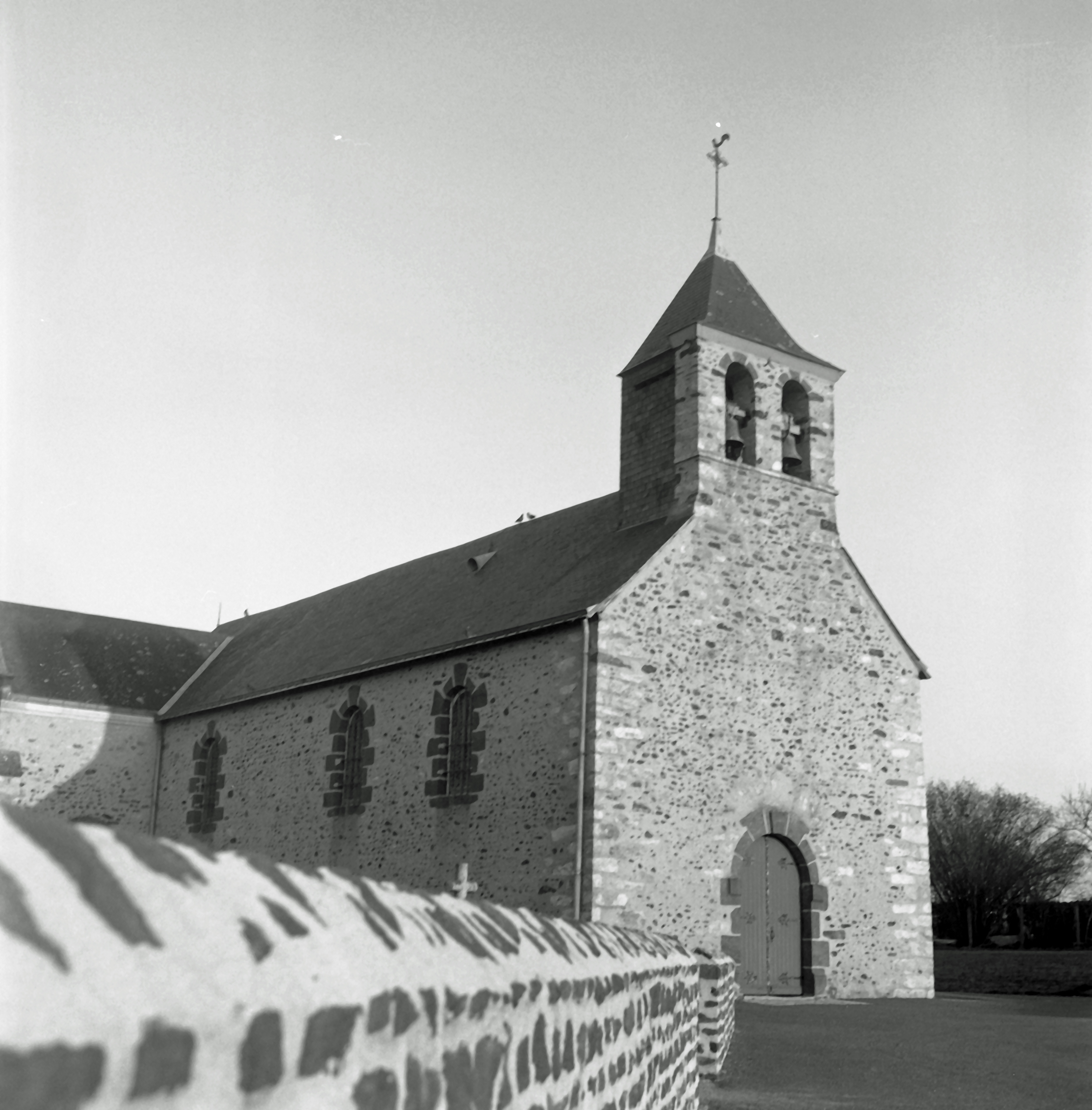
The church of Trangé

== See also ==
- Communes of the Sarthe department
