= Souligné-Flacé =

- Commune
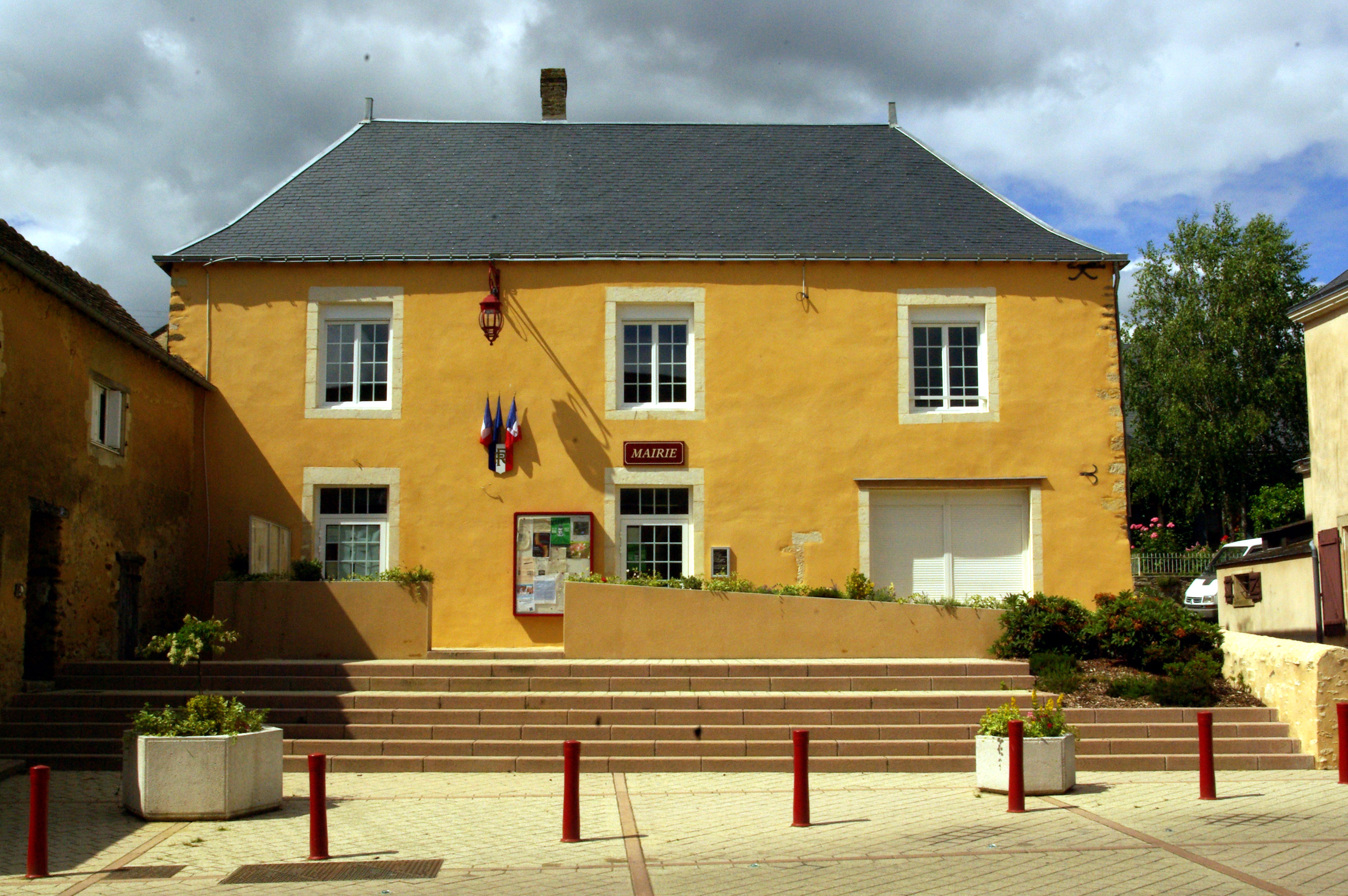
- The town hall of Souligné-Flacé
- Location of Souligné-Flacé
- Location within France Location within Pays de la Loire
- Coordinates: 47°58′29″N 0°00′44″E
- Country: France
- Region: Pays de la Loire
- Department: Sarthe
- Arrondissement: La Flèche
- Canton: La Suze-sur-Sarthe
- Intercommunality: CC du Val de Sarthe

Government
  - Mayor (2020–2026): Luc Bourmault
- Area^{1}: 16.49 km^{2} (6.37 sq mi)
- Highest elevation: 123 m (404 ft)
- Lowest elevation: 43 m (141 ft)
- Population (2023): 636
  - Density: 38.6/km^{2} (99.9/sq mi)
- Demonym(s): Soulignéen, Soulignéenne
- Time zone: UTC+01:00 (CET)
  - Summer (DST): UTC+02:00 (CEST)
- INSEE/Postal code: 72339 /72210
- ^{1} French Land Register data, which excludes lakes, ponds, glaciers > 1 km^{2} (0.386 sq mi or 247 acres) and river estuaries.

Souligné-Flacé (French pronunciation: [suliɲe flase]) is a commune in the Sarthe department in the region of Pays de la Loire in north-western France.

== See also ==
- Communes of the Sarthe department
