= Fay, Sarthe =

Fay
- Commune
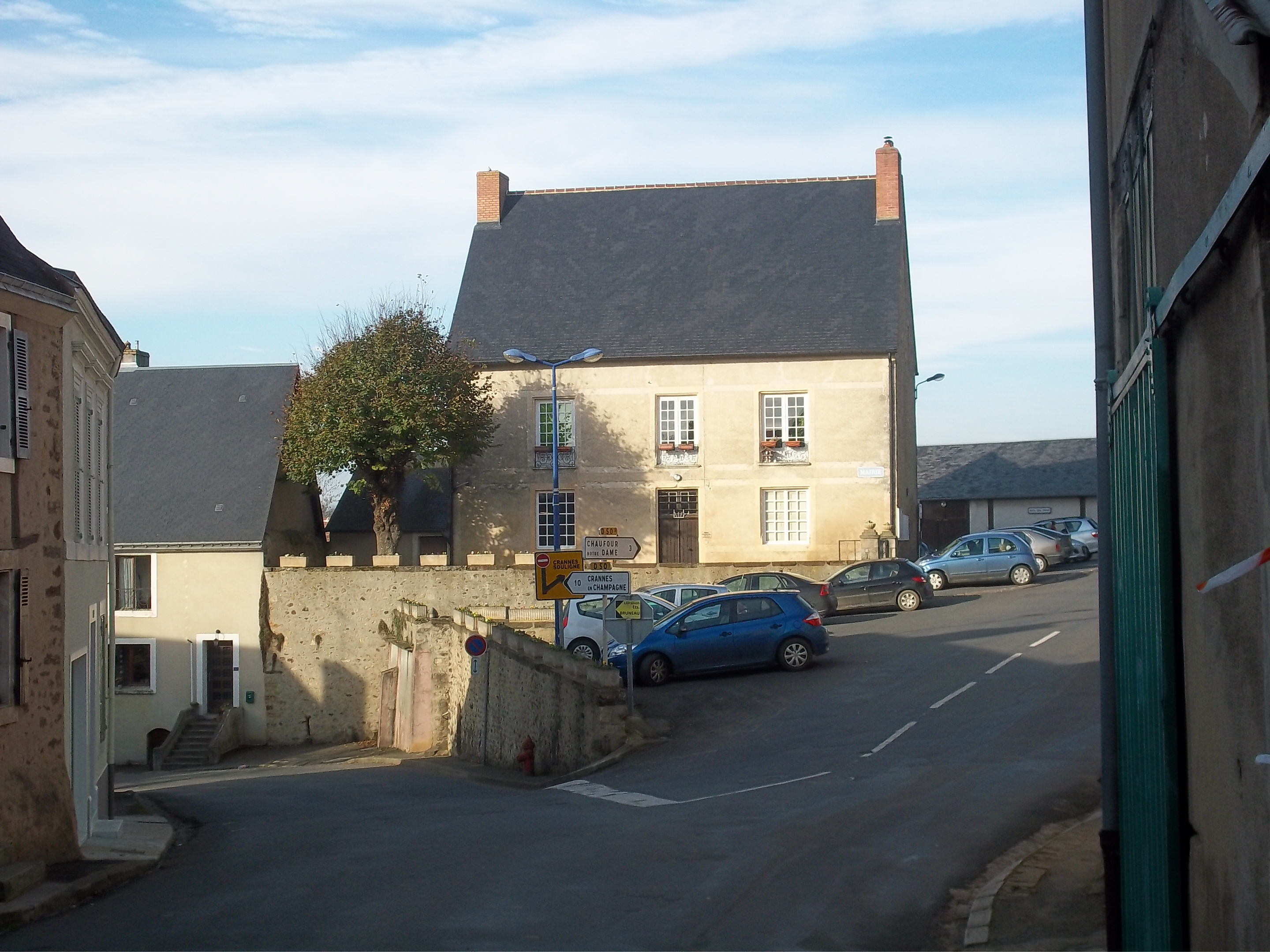
- Town hall
- Location of Fay
- Location within France Location within Pays de la Loire
- Coordinates: 48°00′32″N 0°04′17″E
- Country: France
- Region: Pays de la Loire
- Department: Sarthe
- Arrondissement: Le Mans
- Canton: Le Mans-7
- Intercommunality: Le Mans Métropole

Government
  - Mayor (2020–2026): Maurice Pollefoort
- Area^{1}: 9.48 km^{2} (3.66 sq mi)
- Highest elevation: 127 m (417 ft)
- Lowest elevation: 57 m (187 ft)
- Population (2023): 751
  - Density: 79.2/km^{2} (205/sq mi)
- Demonym(s): Fayard, Fayarde
- Time zone: UTC+01:00 (CET)
  - Summer (DST): UTC+02:00 (CEST)
- INSEE/Postal code: 72130 /72550
- ^{1} French Land Register data, which excludes lakes, ponds, glaciers > 1 km^{2} (0.386 sq mi or 247 acres) and river estuaries.

Fay is a commune in the Sarthe department in the Pays de la Loire region in north-western France.

== See also ==
- Communes of the Sarthe department
