= Pruillé-le-Chétif =

- Commune
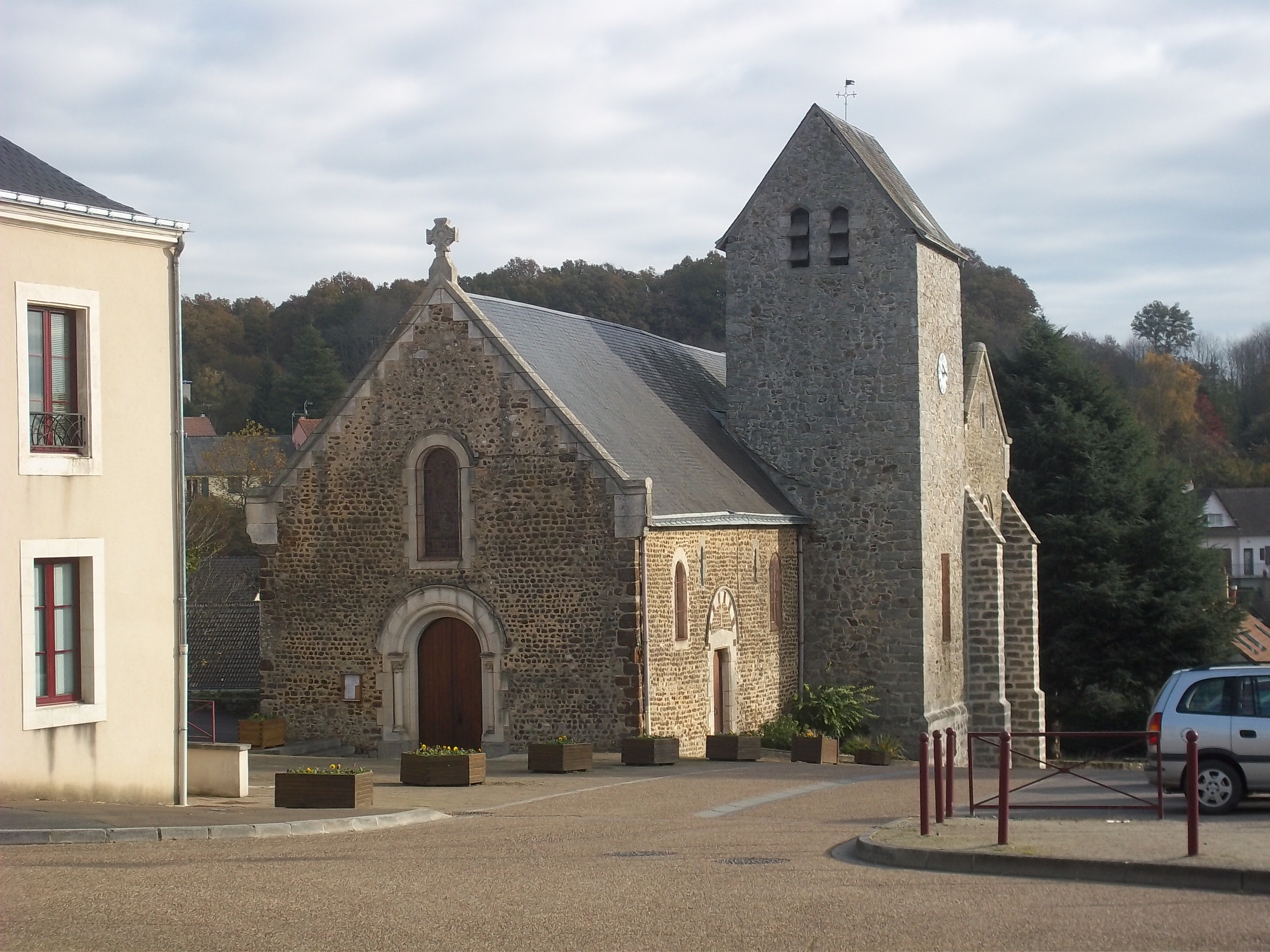
- The church of Saint-Pierre, in Pruillé-le-Chétif
- Location of Pruillé-le-Chétif
- Location within France Location within Pays de la Loire
- Coordinates: 47°59′37″N 0°06′34″E
- Country: France
- Region: Pays de la Loire
- Department: Sarthe
- Arrondissement: Le Mans
- Canton: Le Mans-7
- Intercommunality: Le Mans Métropole

Government
  - Mayor (2020–2026): Isabelle Leballeur
- Area^{1}: 10.30 km^{2} (3.98 sq mi)
- Highest elevation: 128 m (420 ft)
- Lowest elevation: 52 m (171 ft)
- Population (2023): 1,329
  - Density: 129.0/km^{2} (334.2/sq mi)
- Demonym(s): Pruilléen, Pruilléenne
- Time zone: UTC+01:00 (CET)
  - Summer (DST): UTC+02:00 (CEST)
- INSEE/Postal code: 72247 /72700
- ^{1} French Land Register data, which excludes lakes, ponds, glaciers > 1 km^{2} (0.386 sq mi or 247 acres) and river estuaries.

Pruillé-le-Chétif (French pronunciation: [pʁɥije lə ʃetif]) is a commune in the Sarthe department in the region of Pays de la Loire in north-western France.

== See also ==
- Communes of the Sarthe department
