= Chaufour-Notre-Dame =

- Commune
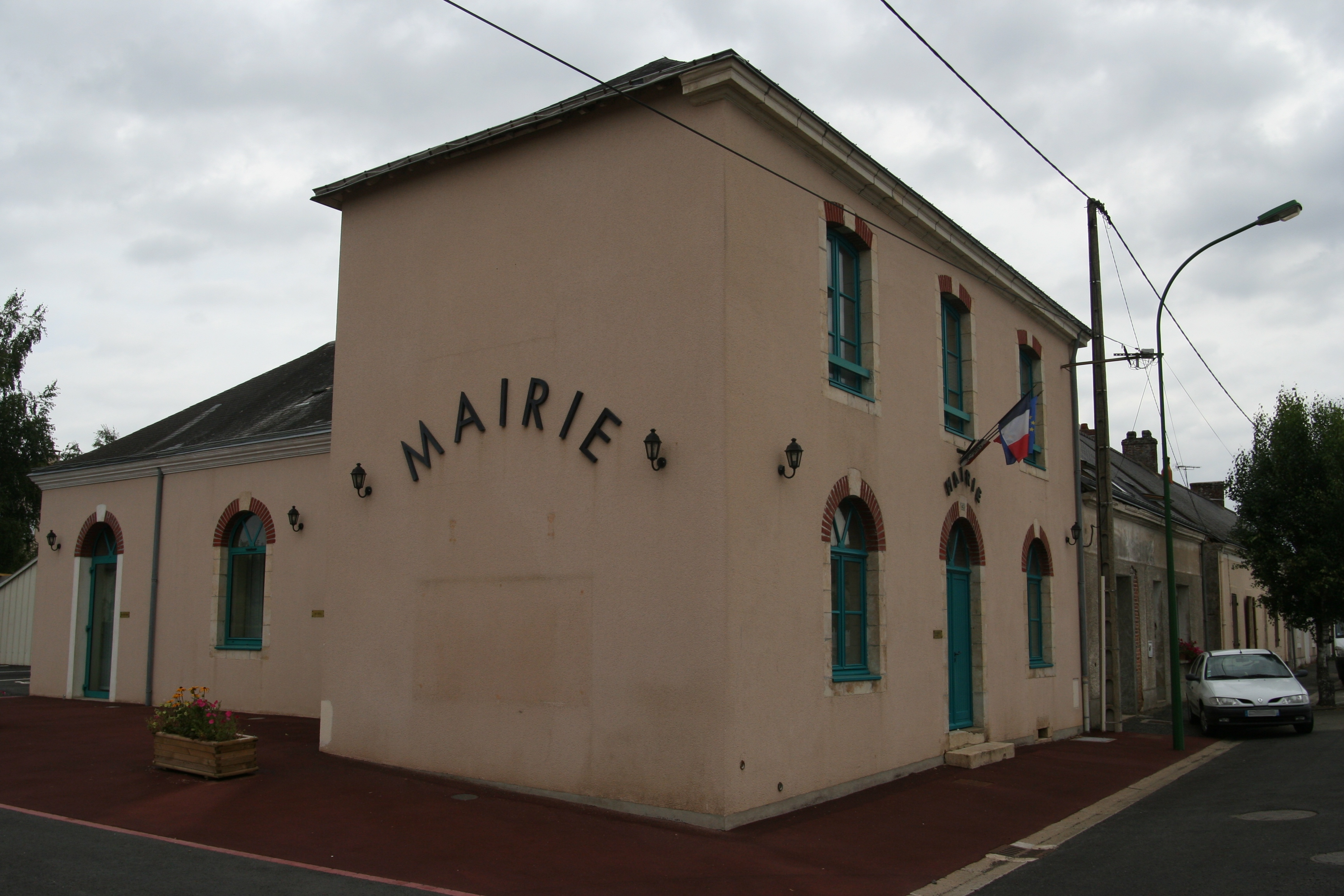
- Town hall
- Location of Chaufour-Notre-Dame
- Location within France Location within Pays de la Loire
- Coordinates: 48°01′34″N 0°04′33″E
- Country: France
- Region: Pays de la Loire
- Department: Sarthe
- Arrondissement: Le Mans
- Canton: Le Mans-7
- Intercommunality: Le Mans Métropole

Government
  - Mayor (2020–2026): Patrice Leboucher
- Area^{1}: 11.19 km^{2} (4.32 sq mi)
- Highest elevation: 131 m (430 ft)
- Lowest elevation: 68 m (223 ft)
- Population (2023): 1,173
  - Density: 104.8/km^{2} (271.5/sq mi)
- Demonym(s): Calidofournien, Calidofournienne
- Time zone: UTC+01:00 (CET)
  - Summer (DST): UTC+02:00 (CEST)
- INSEE/Postal code: 72073 /72550
- ^{1} French Land Register data, which excludes lakes, ponds, glaciers > 1 km^{2} (0.386 sq mi or 247 acres) and river estuaries.

Chaufour-Notre-Dame (French pronunciation: [ʃofuʁ nɔtʁə dam]) is a commune in the Sarthe department in the Pays de la Loire region in north-western France.

It is located on the D357, 10 km west of Le Mans.

== See also ==
- Communes of the Sarthe department
