= Étival-lès-le-Mans =

- Commune
- Coat of arms
- Location of Étival-lès-le-Mans
- Location within France Location within Pays de la Loire
- Coordinates: 47°57′26″N 0°05′25″E
- Country: France
- Region: Pays de la Loire
- Department: Sarthe
- Arrondissement: La Flèche
- Canton: La Suze-sur-Sarthe
- Intercommunality: Val de Sarthe

Government
  - Mayor (2020–2026): Emmanuel Franco
- Area^{1}: 10.34 km^{2} (3.99 sq mi)
- Highest elevation: 101 m (331 ft)
- Lowest elevation: 43 m (141 ft)
- Population (2023): 1,826
  - Density: 176.6/km^{2} (457.4/sq mi)
- Demonym(s): Etivalois, Etivaloise
- Time zone: UTC+01:00 (CET)
  - Summer (DST): UTC+02:00 (CEST)
- INSEE/Postal code: 72127 /72700
- ^{1} French Land Register data, which excludes lakes, ponds, glaciers > 1 km^{2} (0.386 sq mi or 247 acres) and river estuaries.

Étival-lès-le-Mans (French pronunciation: [etival lɛ lə mɑ̃], literally Étival near Le Mans) is a commune in the Sarthe department in the Pays de la Loire region in north-western France.

== See also ==
- Communes of the Sarthe department
