= Arrondissement of Le Mans =

Coordinates: 48°00′N 0°11′E

Le Mans
- Arrondissement
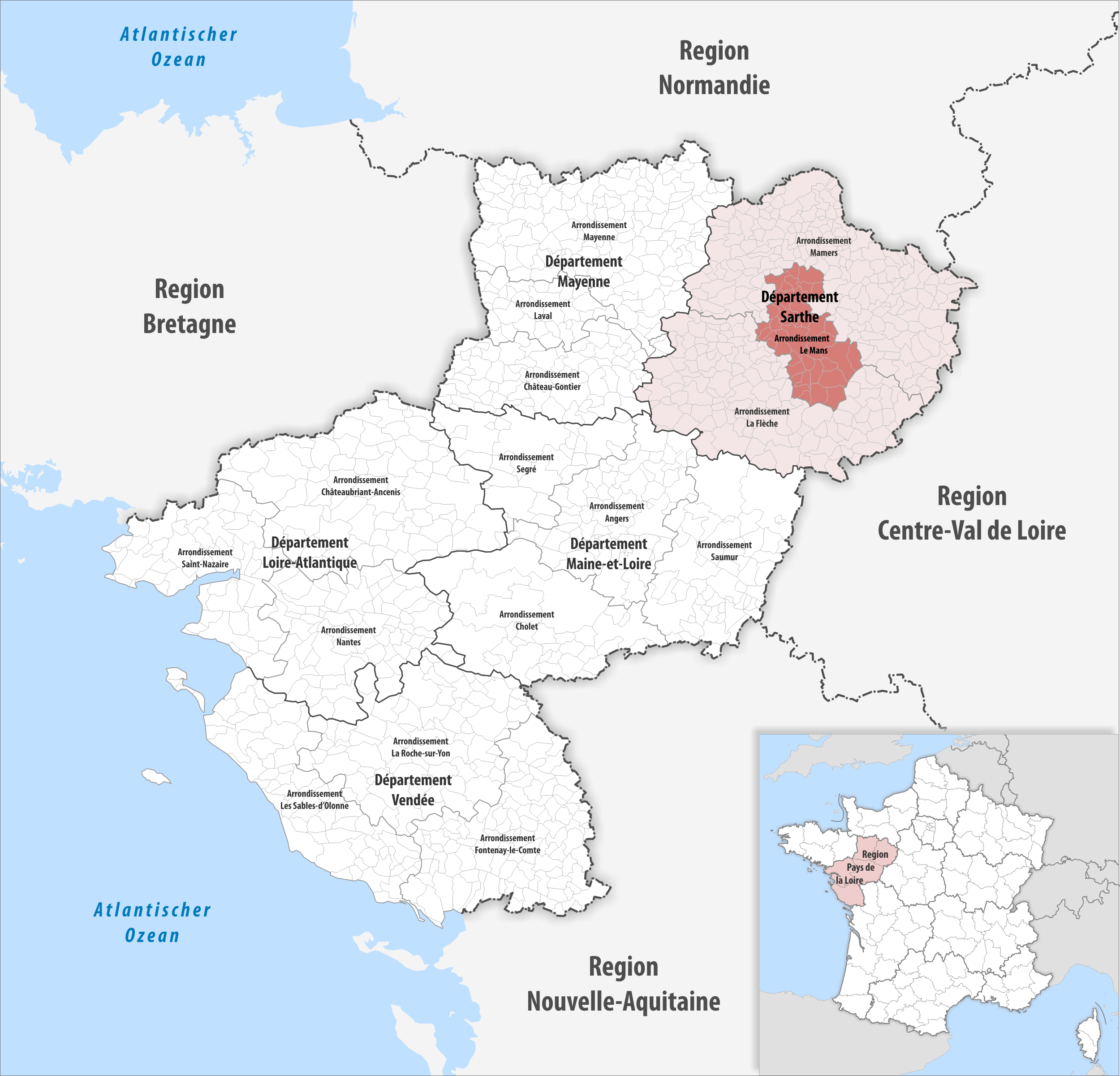
- Location within the region Pays de la Loire
- Country: France
- Region: Pays de la Loire
- Department: Sarthe
- No. of communes: {{{nbcomm}}}
- Area: 779.7 km^{2} (301.0 sq mi)
- Population (2023): 269,386
  - Density: 345.5/km^{2} (894.8/sq mi)
- INSEE code: 723

The arrondissement of Le Mans is an arrondissement of France in the Sarthe department in the Pays de la Loire region. It has 44 communes. Its population is 267,560 (2021), and its area is 779.7 km^{2} (301.0 sq mi).

== Composition ==
The communes of the arrondissement of Le Mans, and their INSEE codes, are:

1. Aigné (72001)
2. Allonnes (72003)
3. Arnage (72008)
4. Ballon-Saint-Mars (72023)
5. La Bazoge (72024)
6. Brette-les-Pins (72047)
7. Challes (72053)
8. Champagné (72054)
9. Changé (72058)
10. La Chapelle-Saint-Aubin (72065)
11. Chaufour-Notre-Dame (72073)
12. Coulaines (72095)
13. Courcebœufs (72099)
14. Écommoy (72124)
15. Fay (72130)
16. La Guierche (72147)
17. Joué-l'Abbé (72150)
18. Laigné-Saint-Gervais (72155)
19. Le Mans (72181)
20. Marigné-Laillé (72187)
21. La Milesse (72198)
22. Moncé-en-Belin (72200)
23. Montbizot (72205)
24. Mulsanne (72213)
25. Neuville-sur-Sarthe (72217)
26. Parigné-l'Évêque (72231)
27. Pruillé-le-Chétif (72247)
28. Rouillon (72257)
29. Ruaudin (72260)
30. Saint-Biez-en-Belin (72268)
31. Saint-Georges-du-Bois (72280)
32. Sainte-Jamme-sur-Sarthe (72289)
33. Saint-Jean-d'Assé (72290)
34. Saint-Mars-d'Outillé (72299)
35. Saint-Ouen-en-Belin (72306)
36. Saint-Pavace (72310)
37. Saint-Saturnin (72320)
38. Sargé-lès-le-Mans (72328)
39. Souillé (72338)
40. Souligné-sous-Ballon (72340)
41. Teillé (72349)
42. Teloché (72350)
43. Trangé (72360)
44. Yvré-l'Évêque (72386)

== History ==
The arrondissement of Le Mans was created in 1800. In February 2006 it lost the five cantons of La Chartre-sur-le-Loir, Château-du-Loir, Le Grand-Lucé, Loué and La Suze-sur-Sarthe to the arrondissement of La Flèche, and the six cantons of Bouloire, Conlie, Montfort-le-Gesnois, Saint-Calais, Sillé-le-Guillaume and Vibraye to the arrondissement of Mamers. In August 2012 it gained the commune Champagné from the arrondissement of Mamers, and it lost the communes Beaufay, Courcemont and Savigné-l'Évêque to the arrondissement of Mamers.

As a result of the reorganisation of the cantons of France which came into effect in 2015, the borders of the cantons are no longer related to the borders of the arrondissements. The cantons of the arrondissement of Le Mans were, as of January 2015:

1. Allonnes
2. Ballon
3. Écommoy
4. Le Mans-Centre
5. Le Mans-Est-Campagne
6. Le Mans-Nord-Campagne
7. Le Mans-Nord-Ouest
8. Le Mans-Nord-Ville
9. Le Mans-Ouest
10. Le Mans-Sud-Est
11. Le Mans-Sud-Ouest
12. Le Mans-Ville-Est
