= Challes =

Challes is the name or part of the name of several communes in France:

- Challes, Sarthe, in the Sarthe department
- Challes-la-Montagne (formerly Challes), in the Ain department
- Challes-les-Eaux, in the Savoie department
