= Changé, Sarthe =

Changé
- Commune
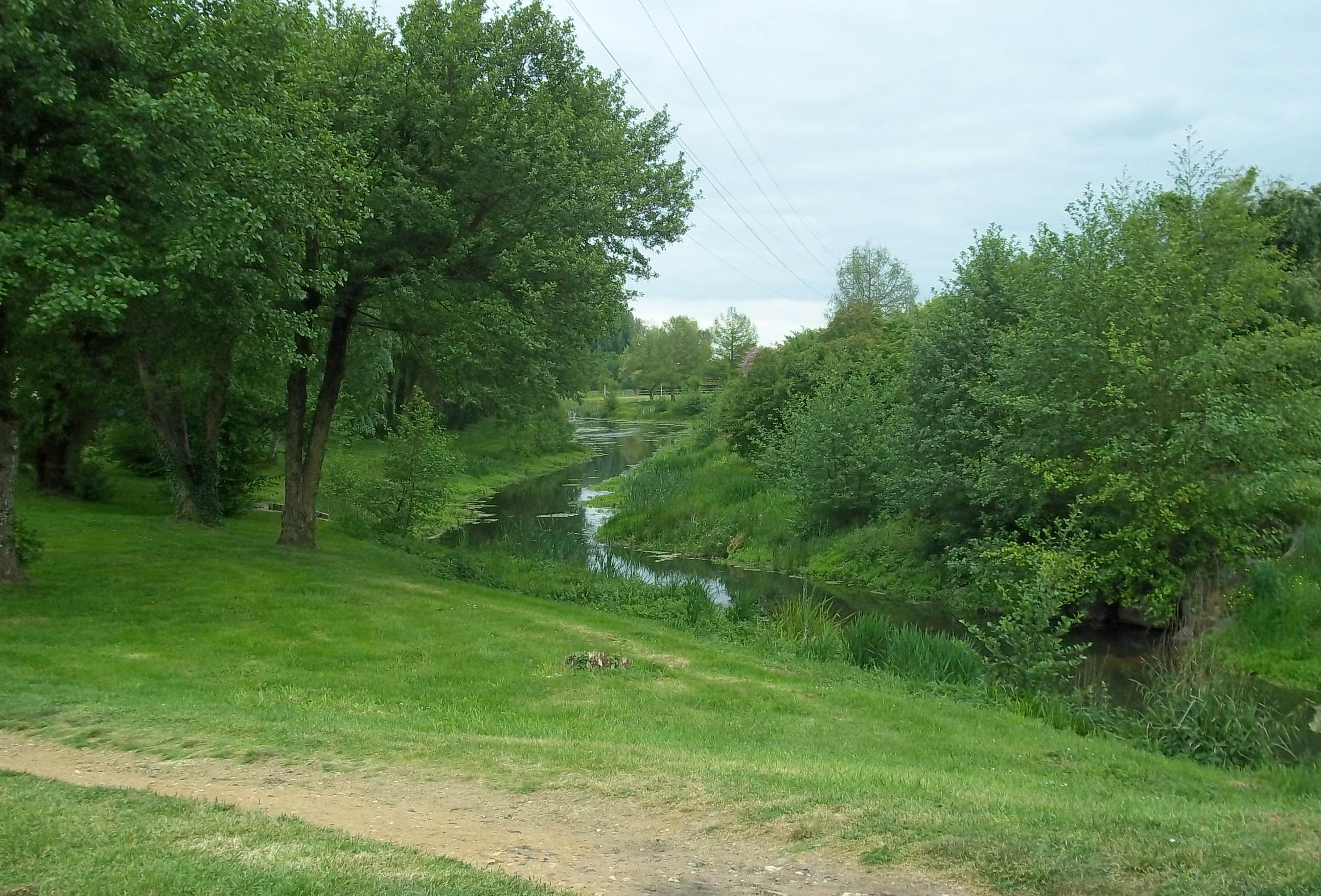
- The Auneau creek through the town center
- Location of Changé
- Location within France Location within Pays de la Loire
- Coordinates: 47°59′19″N 0°16′59″E
- Country: France
- Region: Pays de la Loire
- Department: Sarthe
- Arrondissement: Le Mans
- Canton: Changé
- Intercommunality: CC du Sud Est Manceau

Government
  - Mayor (2020–2026): Yves-Marie Hervé
- Area^{1}: 35.06 km^{2} (13.54 sq mi)
- Highest elevation: 127 m (417 ft)
- Lowest elevation: 49 m (161 ft)
- Population (2023): 6,911
  - Density: 197.1/km^{2} (510.5/sq mi)
- Demonym(s): Changéen, Changéenne
- Time zone: UTC+01:00 (CET)
  - Summer (DST): UTC+02:00 (CEST)
- INSEE/Postal code: 72058 /72560
- ^{1} French Land Register data, which excludes lakes, ponds, glaciers > 1 km^{2} (0.386 sq mi or 247 acres) and river estuaries.

Changé (French pronunciation: [ʃɑ̃ʒe]) is a commune in the Sarthe department in the region of Pays de la Loire in north-western France.

== Population ==
Historical population
Year	Pop.	±% p.a.
1968	2,989	—
1975	3,684	+3.03%
1982	4,072	+1.44%
1990	4,428	+1.05%
1999	5,200	+1.80%
2007	5,735	+1.23%
2012	6,340	+2.03%
2017	6,519	+0.56%
2023	6,911	+0.98%
Source: INSEE

== See also ==
- Communes of the Sarthe department
