= Saint-Jean-d'Assé =

- Commune
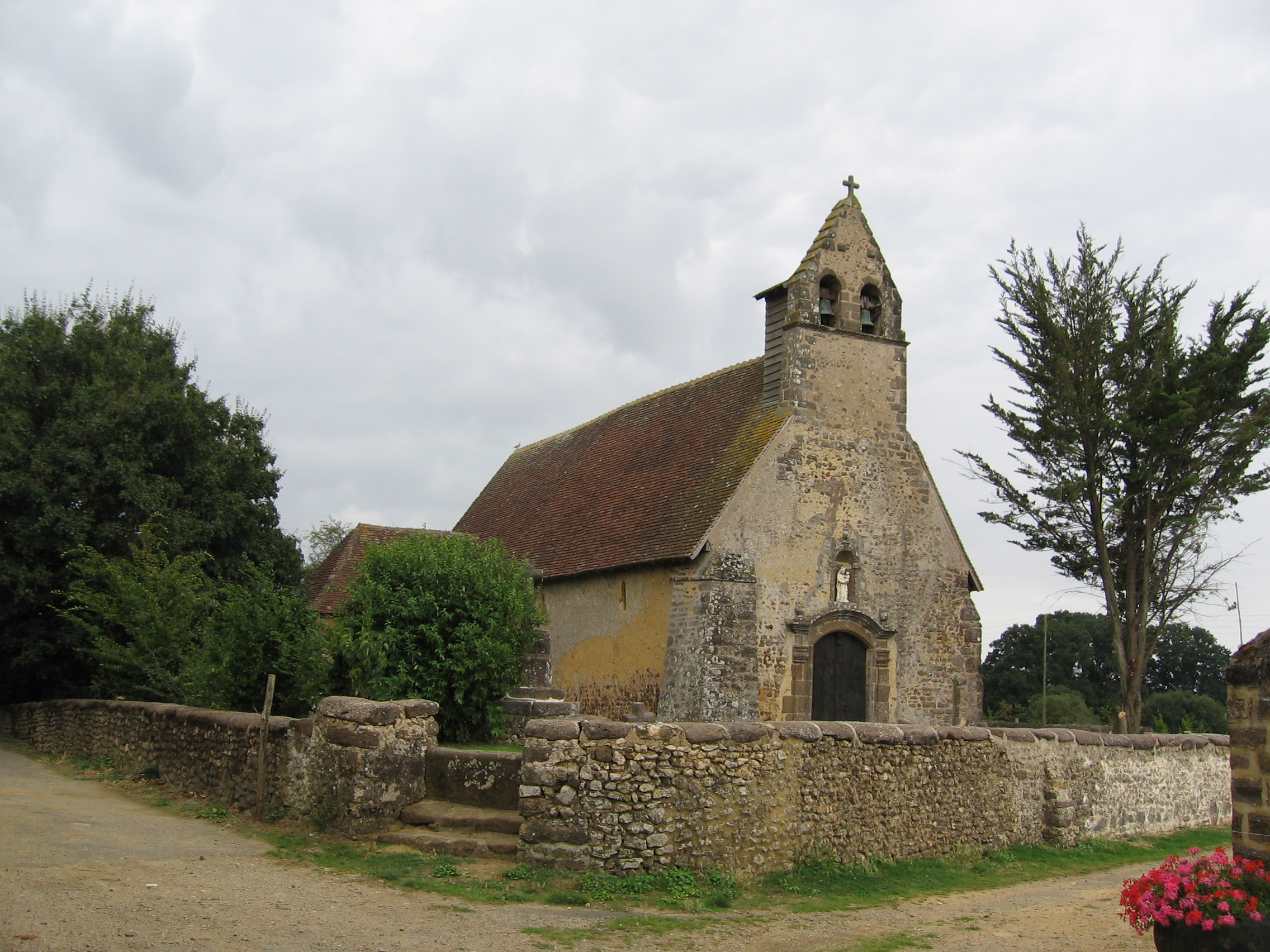
- The chapel of Notre-Dame des Champs, in Saint-Jean-d'Assé
- Location of Saint-Jean-d'Assé
- Location within France Location within Pays de la Loire
- Coordinates: 48°09′05″N 0°07′17″E
- Country: France
- Region: Pays de la Loire
- Department: Sarthe
- Arrondissement: Le Mans
- Canton: Bonnétable
- Intercommunality: Maine Cœur de Sarthe

Government
  - Mayor (2020–2026): Emmanuel Clément
- Area^{1}: 21.29 km^{2} (8.22 sq mi)
- Highest elevation: 135 m (443 ft)
- Lowest elevation: 51 m (167 ft)
- Population (2023): 1,790
  - Density: 84.1/km^{2} (218/sq mi)
- Time zone: UTC+01:00 (CET)
  - Summer (DST): UTC+02:00 (CEST)
- INSEE/Postal code: 72290 /72380
- ^{1} French Land Register data, which excludes lakes, ponds, glaciers > 1 km^{2} (0.386 sq mi or 247 acres) and river estuaries.

Saint-Jean-d'Assé (French pronunciation: [sɛ̃ ʒɑ̃ dase], literally Saint-Jean of Assé) is a commune in the Sarthe department in the region of Pays de la Loire in north-western France.

== See also ==
- Communes of the Sarthe department
