= Jauzé =

- Commune
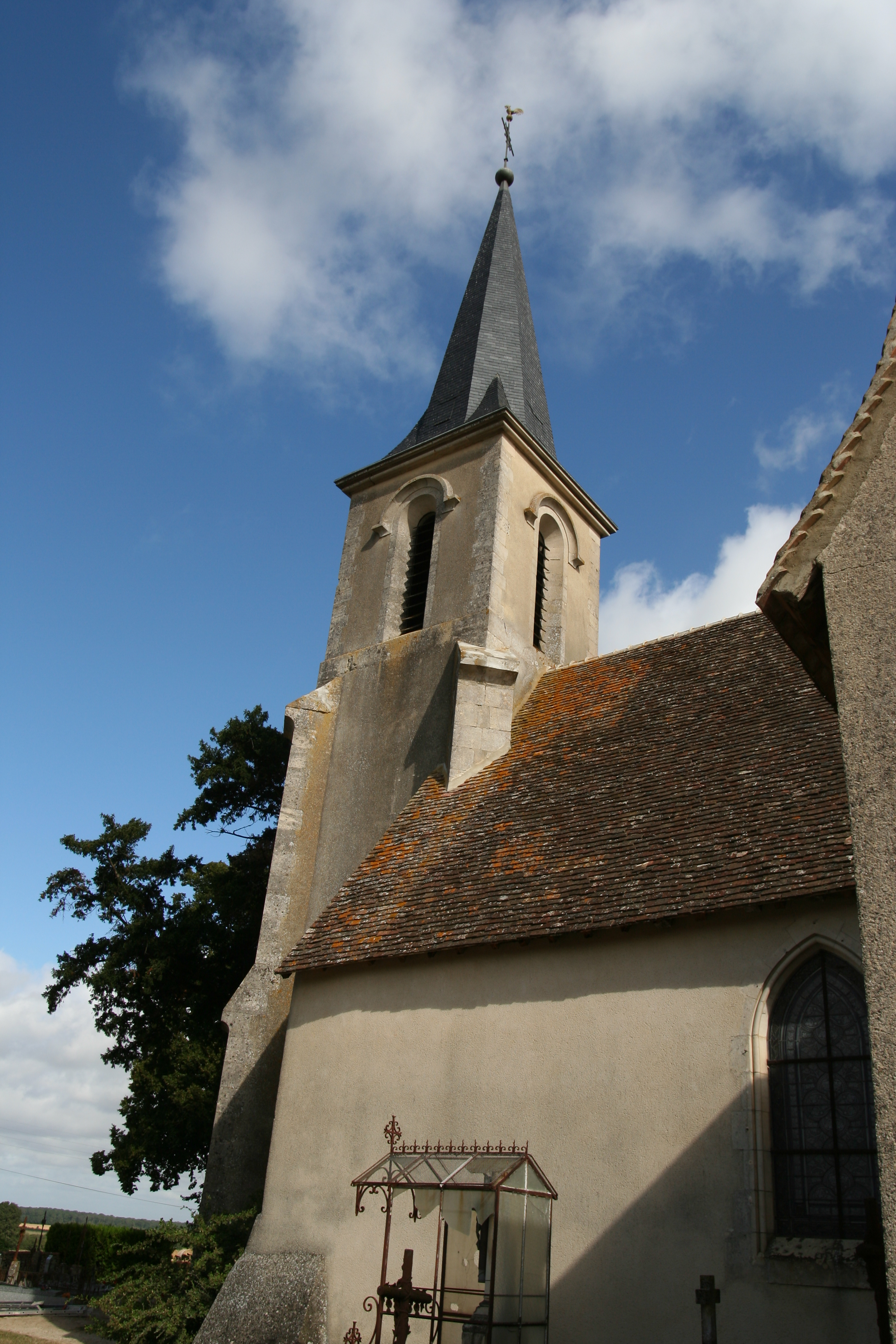
- Saint-Barthélemy Church in Jauzé
- Location of Jauzé
- Location within France Location within Pays de la Loire
- Coordinates: 48°12′44″N 0°22′14″E
- Country: France
- Region: Pays de la Loire
- Department: Sarthe
- Arrondissement: Mamers
- Canton: Bonnétable
- Intercommunality: Maine Saosnois

Government
  - Mayor (2020–2026): Loïc Crinier
- Area^{1}: 6 km^{2} (2.3 sq mi)
- Population (2023): 80
  - Density: 13/km^{2} (35/sq mi)
- Time zone: UTC+01:00 (CET)
  - Summer (DST): UTC+02:00 (CEST)
- INSEE/Postal code: 72148 /72110
- Website: Jauzéen, Jauzéenne
- ^{1} French Land Register data, which excludes lakes, ponds, glaciers > 1 km^{2} (0.386 sq mi or 247 acres) and river estuaries.

Jauzé (French pronunciation: [ʒoze]) is a commune in the Sarthe department in the region of Pays de la Loire in north-western France.

== See also ==
- Communes of the Sarthe department
