= Yvré-l'Évêque =

- Commune
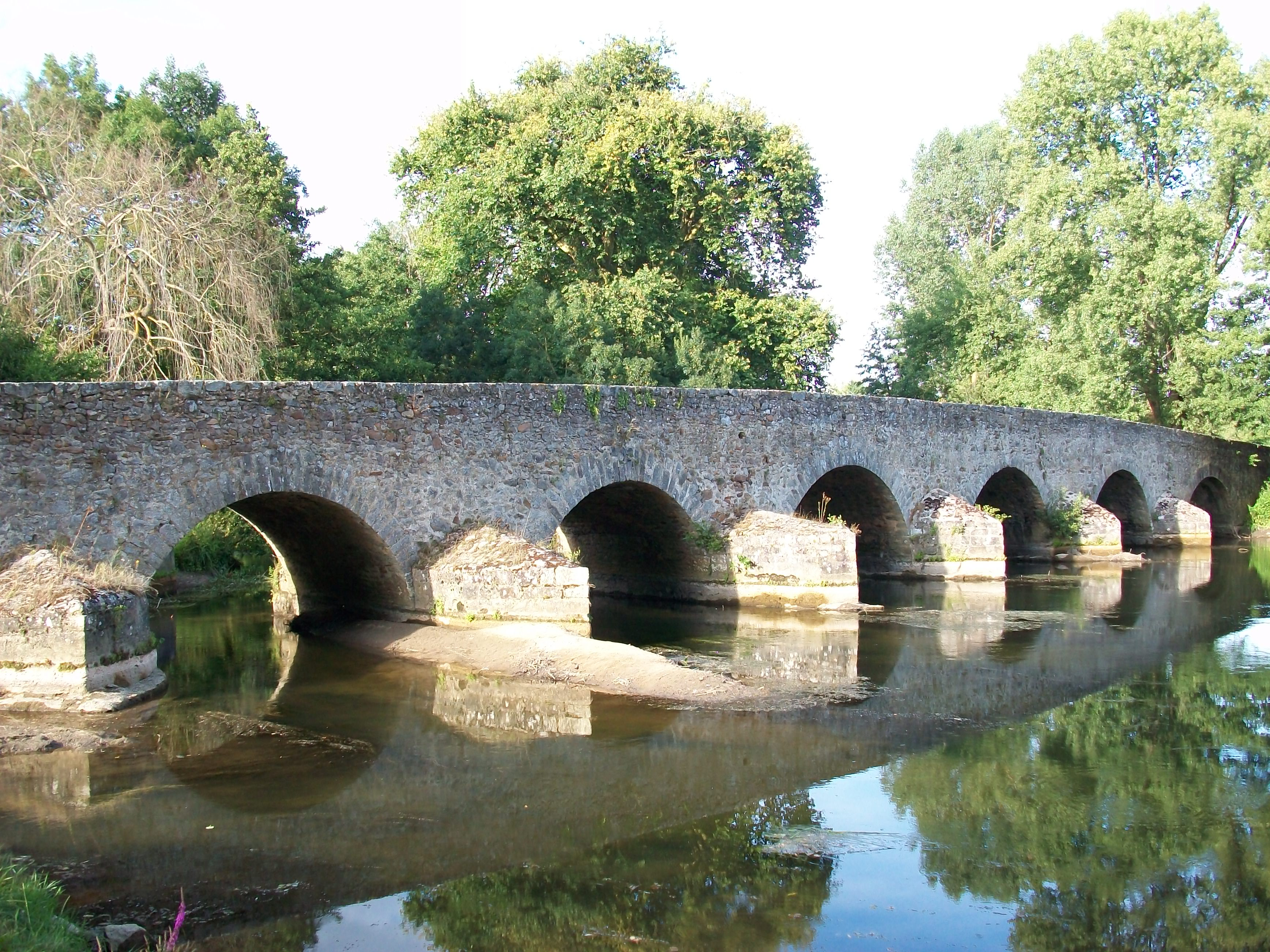
- The Roman bridge of Yvré-l'Évêque

- Coat of arms
- Location of Yvré-l'Évêque
- Location within France Location within Pays de la Loire
- Coordinates: 48°00′54″N 0°16′02″E
- Country: France
- Region: Pays de la Loire
- Department: Sarthe
- Arrondissement: Le Mans
- Canton: Changé
- Intercommunality: Le Mans Métropole

Government
  - Mayor (2020–2026): Damienne Fleury
- Area^{1}: 27.61 km^{2} (10.66 sq mi)
- Highest elevation: 118 m (387 ft)
- Lowest elevation: 44 m (144 ft)
- Population (2023): 4,181
  - Density: 151.4/km^{2} (392.2/sq mi)
- Demonym(s): Yvréen, Yvréenne
- Time zone: UTC+01:00 (CET)
  - Summer (DST): UTC+02:00 (CEST)
- INSEE/Postal code: 72386 /72530
- ^{1} French Land Register data, which excludes lakes, ponds, glaciers > 1 km^{2} (0.386 sq mi or 247 acres) and river estuaries.

Yvré-l'Évêque (French pronunciation: [ivʁe levɛk]) is a commune in the Sarthe department in the region of Pays de la Loire in north-western France.

== Population ==
Historical population

Year	Pop.	±% p.a.
1793	2,009	—
1800	1,922	−0.63%
1806	2,132	+1.74%
1821	2,214	+0.25%
1831	2,239	+0.11%
1836	2,213	−0.23%
1841	2,090	−1.14%
1846	2,192	+0.96%
1851	2,265	+0.66%
1856	2,506	+2.04%
1861	2,552	+0.36%
1866	2,563	+0.09%
1872	2,305	−1.75%
1876	2,334	+0.31%
1881	2,269	−0.56%
1886	2,205	−0.57%
1891	2,269	+0.57%
1896	2,252	−0.15%
1901	2,222	−0.27%

Year	Pop.	±% p.a.
1906	2,140	−0.75%
1911	2,134	−0.06%
1921	2,145	+0.05%
1926	2,105	−0.38%
1931	2,151	+0.43%
1936	2,230	+0.72%
1946	2,460	+0.99%
1954	2,697	+1.16%
1962	2,718	+0.10%
1968	2,666	−0.32%
1975	2,597	−0.37%
1982	3,306	+3.51%
1990	3,682	+1.36%
1999	4,230	+1.55%
2007	4,406	+0.51%
2012	4,298	−0.50%
2017	4,228	−0.33%
2023	4,181	−0.19%

Source: EHESS (1793-1999) and INSEE

== See also ==
- Communes of the Sarthe department
