= Parigné-l'Évêque =

- Commune
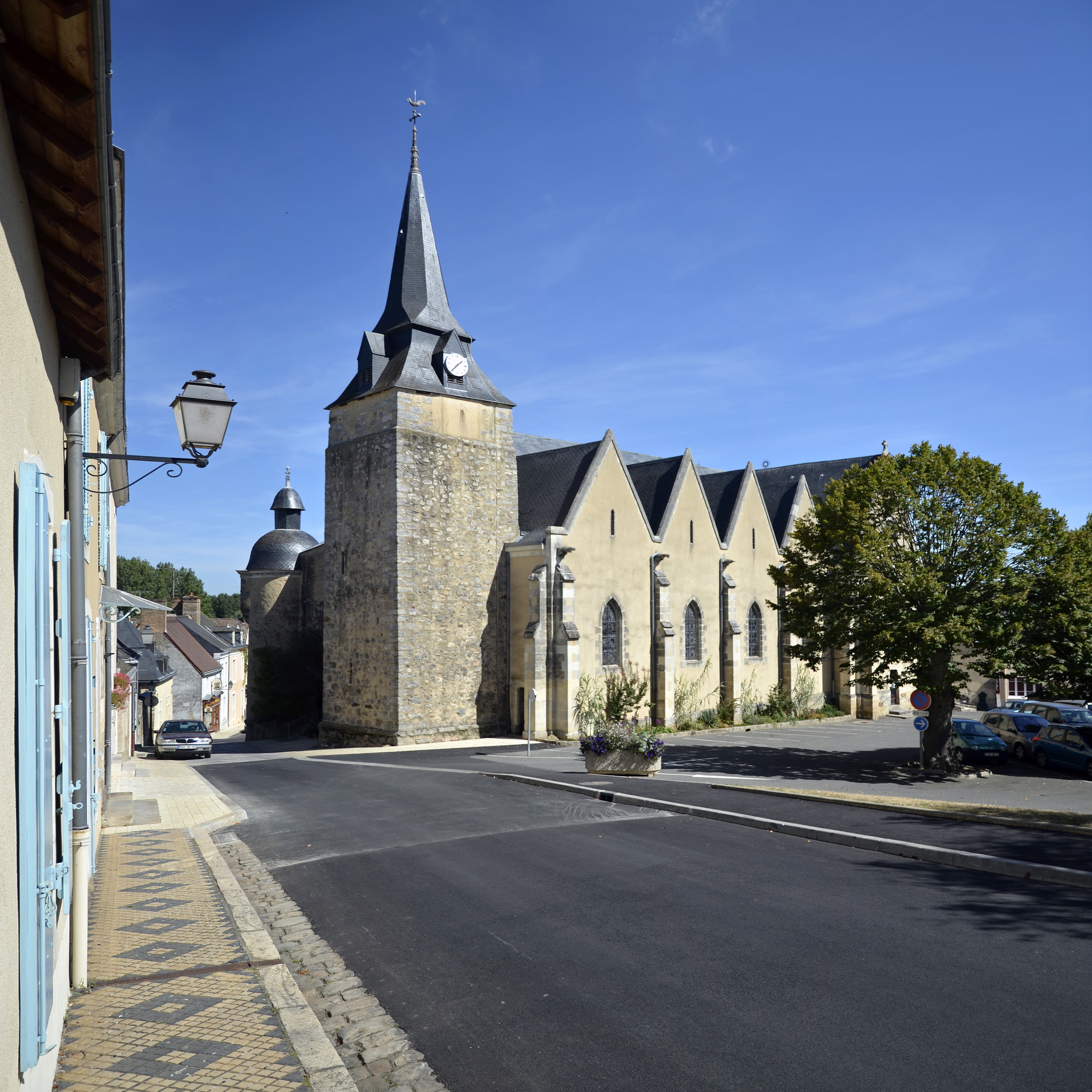
- The church of Notre-Dame-de-l'Assomption
- Location of Parigné-l'Évêque
- Location within France Location within Pays de la Loire
- Coordinates: 47°56′14″N 0°21′55″E
- Country: France
- Region: Pays de la Loire
- Department: Sarthe
- Arrondissement: Le Mans
- Canton: Changé
- Intercommunality: CC du Sud Est Manceau

Government
  - Mayor (2020–2026): Nathalie Morgant
- Area^{1}: 63.4 km^{2} (24.5 sq mi)
- Highest elevation: 151 m (495 ft)
- Lowest elevation: 55 m (180 ft)
- Population (2023): 5,358
  - Density: 84.5/km^{2} (219/sq mi)
- Demonym(s): Parignéen, Parignéenne
- Time zone: UTC+01:00 (CET)
  - Summer (DST): UTC+02:00 (CEST)
- INSEE/Postal code: 72231 /72250
- Website: www.parigneleveque.fr
- ^{1} French Land Register data, which excludes lakes, ponds, glaciers > 1 km^{2} (0.386 sq mi or 247 acres) and river estuaries.

Parigné-l'Évêque (French pronunciation: [paʁiɲe levɛk]) is a commune in the Sarthe department in the region of Pays de la Loire in north-western France.

== Population ==
Historical population
Year	Pop.	±% p.a.
1968	2,965	—
1975	3,582	+2.74%
1982	4,024	+1.68%
1990	4,324	+0.90%
1999	4,503	+0.45%
2007	4,678	+0.48%
2012	4,826	+0.62%
2017	5,086	+1.06%
2023	5,358	+0.87%
Source: INSEE
