= Saint-Pavace =

- Commune
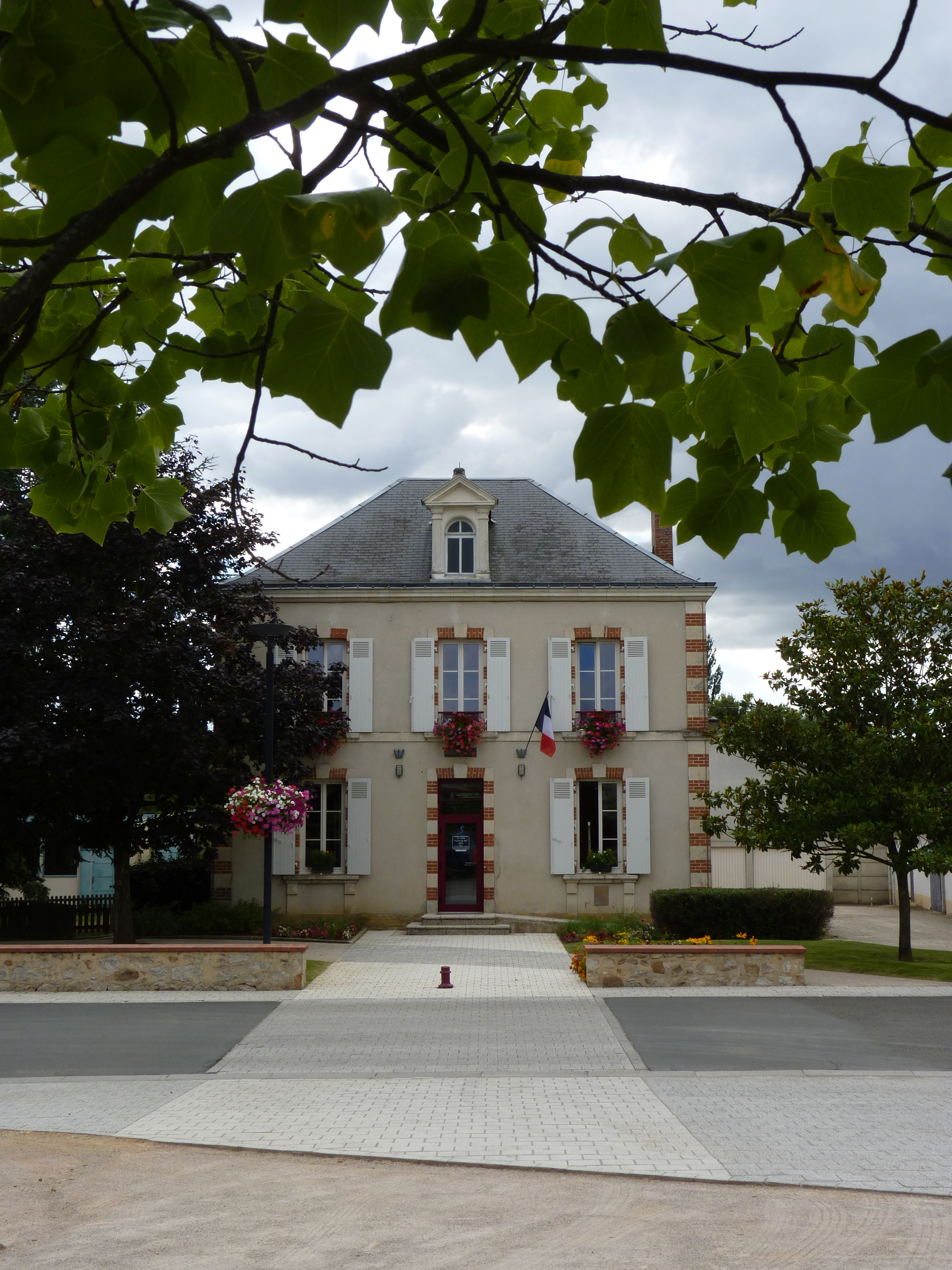
- The town hall of Saint-Pavace
- Location of Saint-Pavace
- Location within France Location within Pays de la Loire
- Coordinates: 48°02′21″N 0°11′19″E
- Country: France
- Region: Pays de la Loire
- Department: Sarthe
- Arrondissement: Le Mans
- Canton: Bonnétable
- Intercommunality: Maine Cœur de Sarthe

Government
  - Mayor (2020–2026): Christian Bonifait
- Area^{1}: 5.16 km^{2} (1.99 sq mi)
- Highest elevation: 112 m (367 ft)
- Lowest elevation: 43 m (141 ft)
- Population (2023): 2,007
  - Density: 389/km^{2} (1,010/sq mi)
- Demonym(s): Palvinéen, Palvinéenne
- Time zone: UTC+01:00 (CET)
  - Summer (DST): UTC+02:00 (CEST)
- INSEE/Postal code: 72310 /72190
- ^{1} French Land Register data, which excludes lakes, ponds, glaciers > 1 km^{2} (0.386 sq mi or 247 acres) and river estuaries.

Saint-Pavace (French pronunciation: [sɛ̃ pavas]) is a commune in the Sarthe department in the region of Pays de la Loire in north-western France.

== Population ==
Historical population
Year	Pop.	±% p.a.
1968	604	—
1975	802	+4.13%
1982	1,700	+11.33%
1990	1,698	−0.01%
1999	1,799	+0.64%
2007	1,847	+0.33%
2012	1,914	+0.72%
2017	1,925	+0.11%
2023	2,007	+0.70%
Source: INSEE

== See also ==
- Communes of the Sarthe department
