= Saint-Mars-d'Outillé =

- Commune
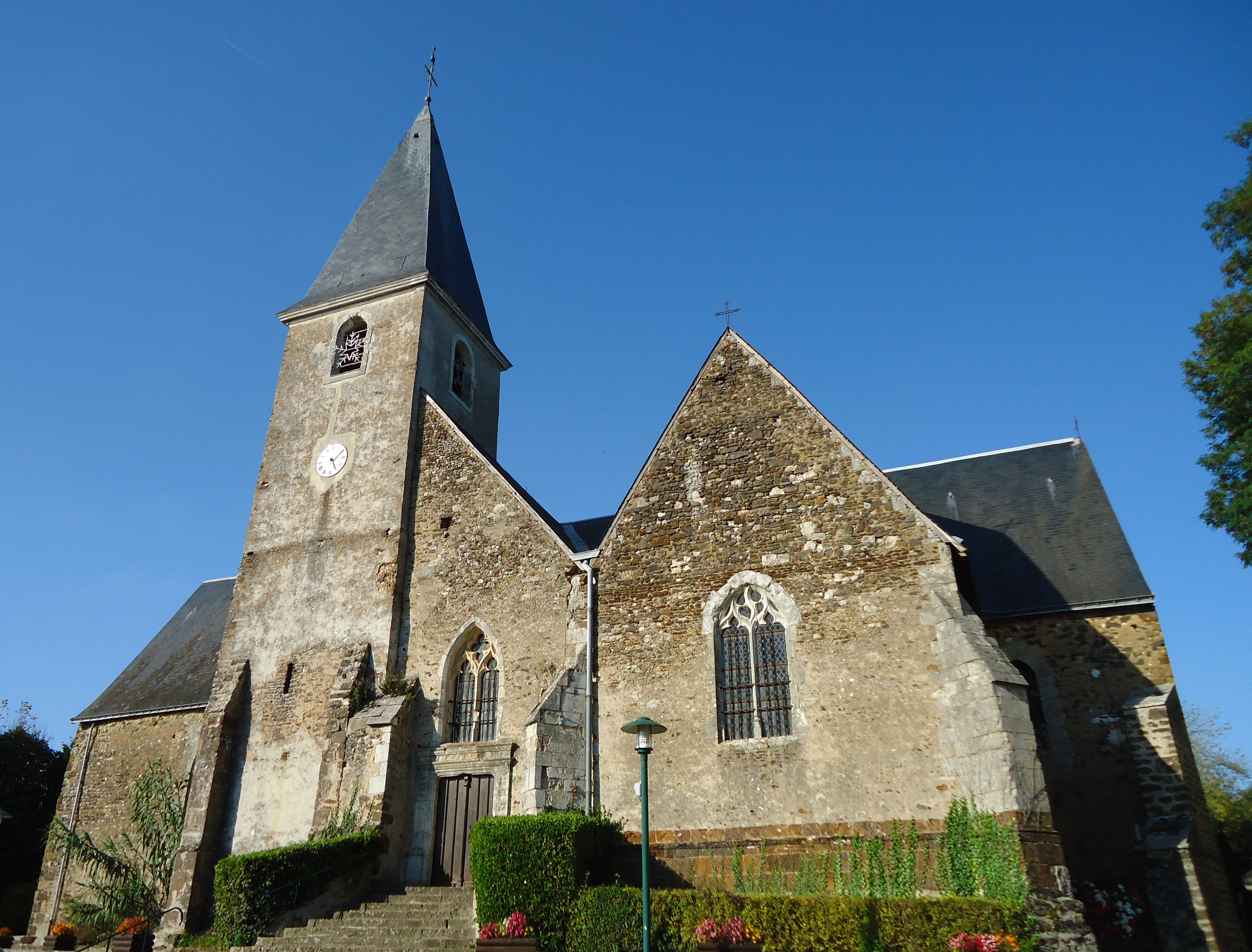
- The church of Saint-Médard, in Saint-Mars-d'Outillé
- Location of Saint-Mars-d'Outillé
- Location within France Location within Pays de la Loire
- Coordinates: 47°53′20″N 0°20′01″E
- Country: France
- Region: Pays de la Loire
- Department: Sarthe
- Arrondissement: Le Mans
- Canton: Changé
- Intercommunality: CC du Sud Est Manceau

Government
  - Mayor (2020–2026): Laurent Taupin
- Area^{1}: 38.04 km^{2} (14.69 sq mi)
- Highest elevation: 168 m (551 ft)
- Lowest elevation: 74 m (243 ft)
- Population (2023): 2,483
  - Density: 65.27/km^{2} (169.1/sq mi)
- Demonym(s): Saint-Martien, Saint-Martienne
- Time zone: UTC+01:00 (CET)
  - Summer (DST): UTC+02:00 (CEST)
- INSEE/Postal code: 72299 /72220
- ^{1} French Land Register data, which excludes lakes, ponds, glaciers > 1 km^{2} (0.386 sq mi or 247 acres) and river estuaries.

Saint-Mars-d'Outillé (French pronunciation: [sɛ̃ maʁ dutije]) is a commune in the Sarthe department in the region of Pays de la Loire in north-western France.

== Population ==
Historical population
Year	Pop.	±% p.a.
1968	1,668	—
1975	2,025	+2.81%
1982	1,770	−1.90%
1990	1,739	−0.22%
1999	1,834	+0.59%
2007	2,198	+2.29%
2012	2,323	+1.11%
2017	2,418	+0.80%
2023	2,483	+0.44%
Source: INSEE

== See also ==
- Communes of the Sarthe department
