= Souligné-sous-Ballon =

- Commune
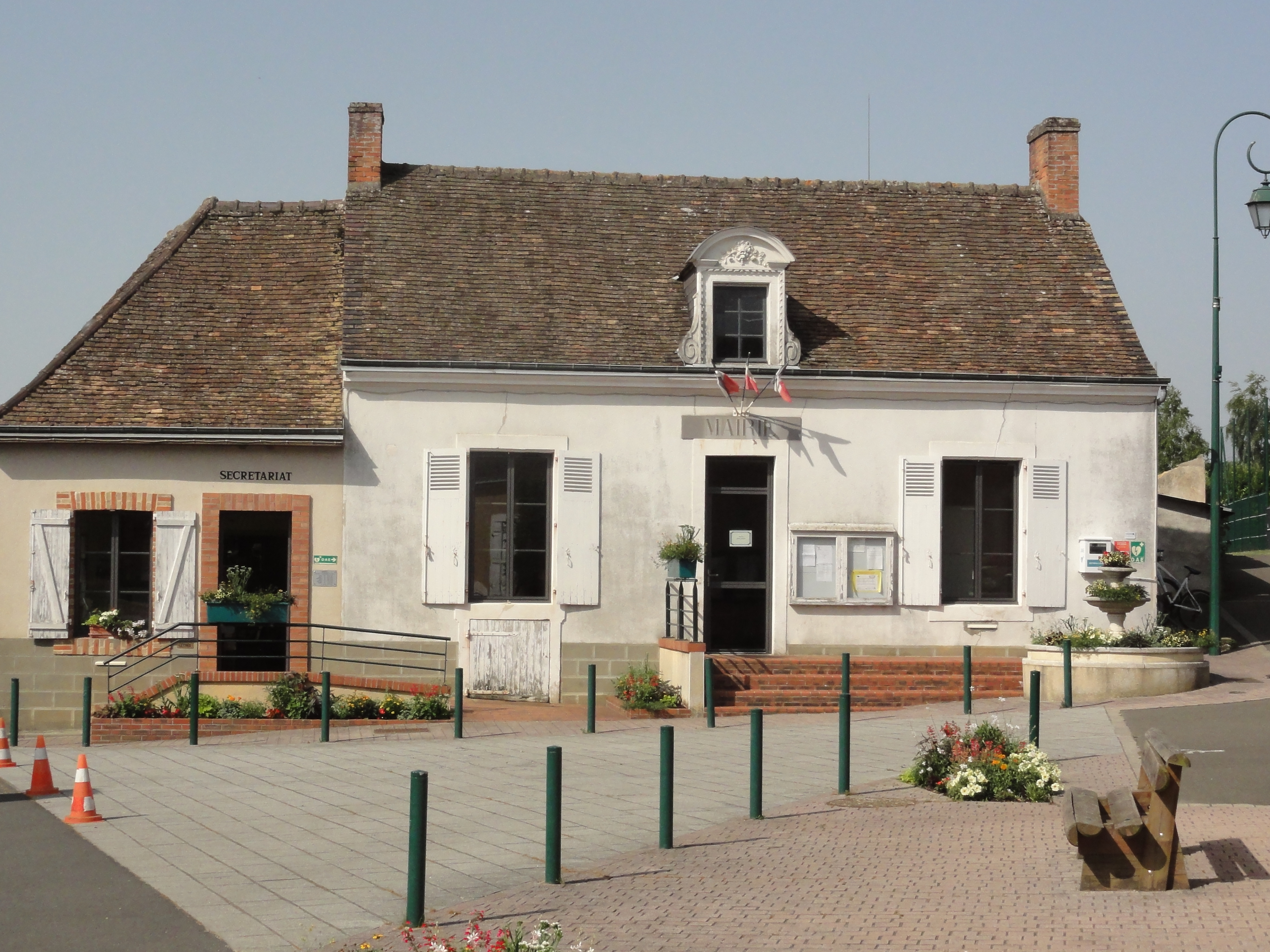
- Town hall

- Coat of arms
- Location of Souligné-sous-Ballon
- Location within France Location within Pays de la Loire
- Coordinates: 48°08′22″N 0°14′13″E
- Country: France
- Region: Pays de la Loire
- Department: Sarthe
- Arrondissement: Le Mans
- Canton: Bonnétable
- Intercommunality: Maine Cœur de Sarthe

Government
  - Mayor (2020–2026): David Chollet
- Area^{1}: 12.76 km^{2} (4.93 sq mi)
- Highest elevation: 103 m (338 ft)
- Lowest elevation: 51 m (167 ft)
- Population (2023): 1,244
  - Density: 97.49/km^{2} (252.5/sq mi)
- Demonym(s): Soulignéen, Soulignéenne
- Time zone: UTC+01:00 (CET)
  - Summer (DST): UTC+02:00 (CEST)
- INSEE/Postal code: 72340 /72290
- ^{1} French Land Register data, which excludes lakes, ponds, glaciers > 1 km^{2} (0.386 sq mi or 247 acres) and river estuaries.

Souligné-sous-Ballon (French pronunciation: [suliɲe su balɔ̃], literally Souligné under Ballon) is a commune in the Sarthe department in the region of Pays de la Loire in north-western France.

== See also ==
- Communes of the Sarthe department
