= Rouperroux-le-Coquet =

- Commune
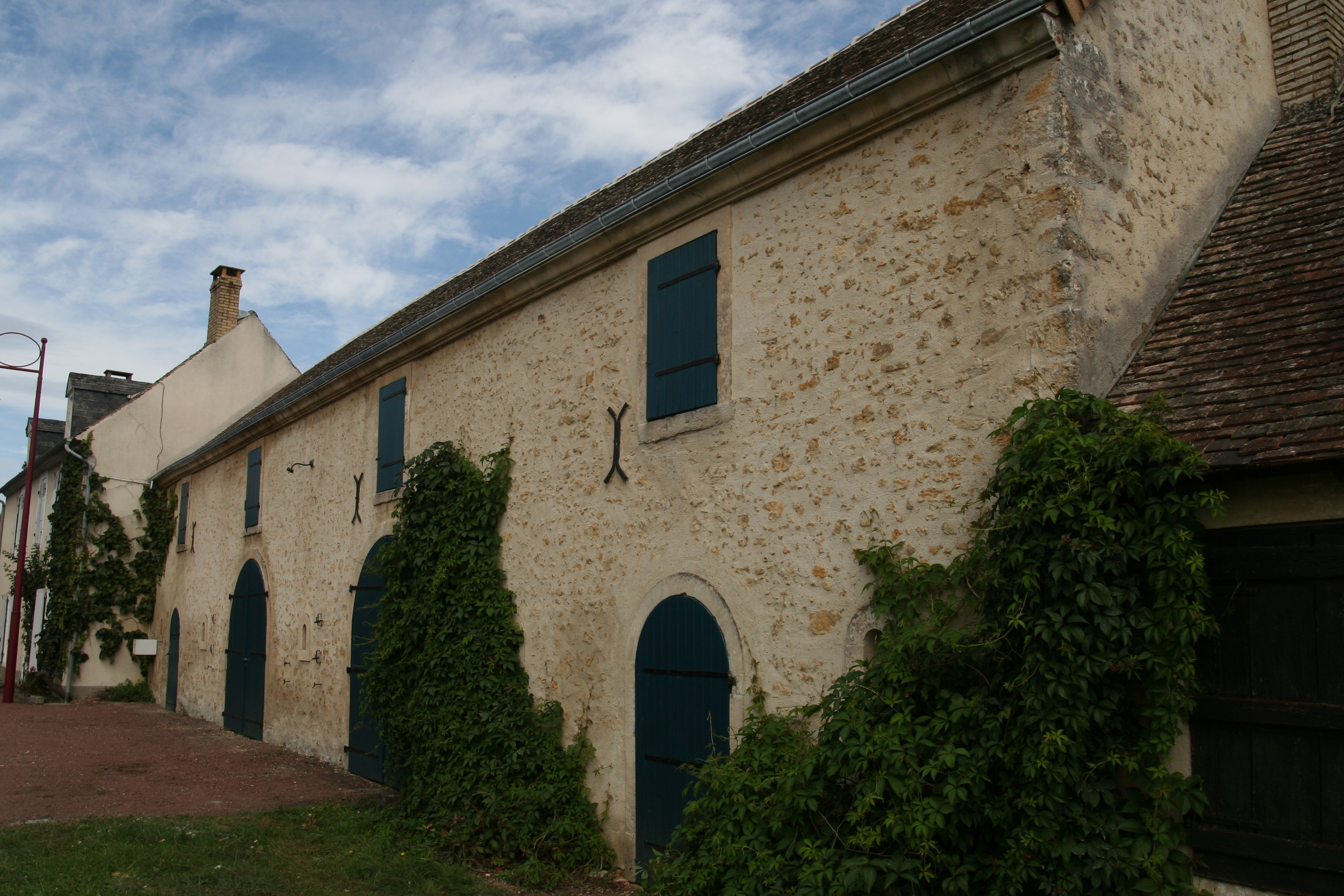
- An old barn in the centre of the village
- Location of Rouperroux-le-Coquet
- Location within France Location within Pays de la Loire
- Coordinates: 48°13′38″N 0°25′53″E
- Country: France
- Region: Pays de la Loire
- Department: Sarthe
- Arrondissement: Mamers
- Canton: Bonnétable
- Intercommunality: Maine Saosnois

Government
  - Mayor (2020–2026): Pascal Champclou
- Area^{1}: 10.27 km^{2} (3.97 sq mi)
- Highest elevation: 133 m (436 ft)
- Lowest elevation: 72 m (236 ft)
- Population (2023): 266
  - Density: 25.9/km^{2} (67.1/sq mi)
- Demonym(s): Coqueroupéen, Coqueroupéenne
- Time zone: UTC+01:00 (CET)
  - Summer (DST): UTC+02:00 (CEST)
- INSEE/Postal code: 72259 /72110
- ^{1} French Land Register data, which excludes lakes, ponds, glaciers > 1 km^{2} (0.386 sq mi or 247 acres) and river estuaries.

Rouperroux-le-Coquet (French pronunciation: [ʁupɛʁu lə kɔkɛ]) is a commune in the Sarthe department in the Pays de la Loire region in north-western France.

== See also ==
- Communes of the Sarthe department
