= Canton of Changé =

Coordinates: 47.98°N 0.28°E

The canton of Changé is an administrative division of the Sarthe department, northwestern France. It was created at the French canton reorganisation which came into effect in March 2015. Its seat is in Changé.

It consists of the following communes:

1. Brette-les-Pins
2. Challes
3. Champagné
4. Changé
5. Parigné-l'Évêque
6. Saint-Mars-d'Outillé
7. Sargé-lès-le-Mans
8. Yvré-l'Évêque
