= Terrehault =

- Commune
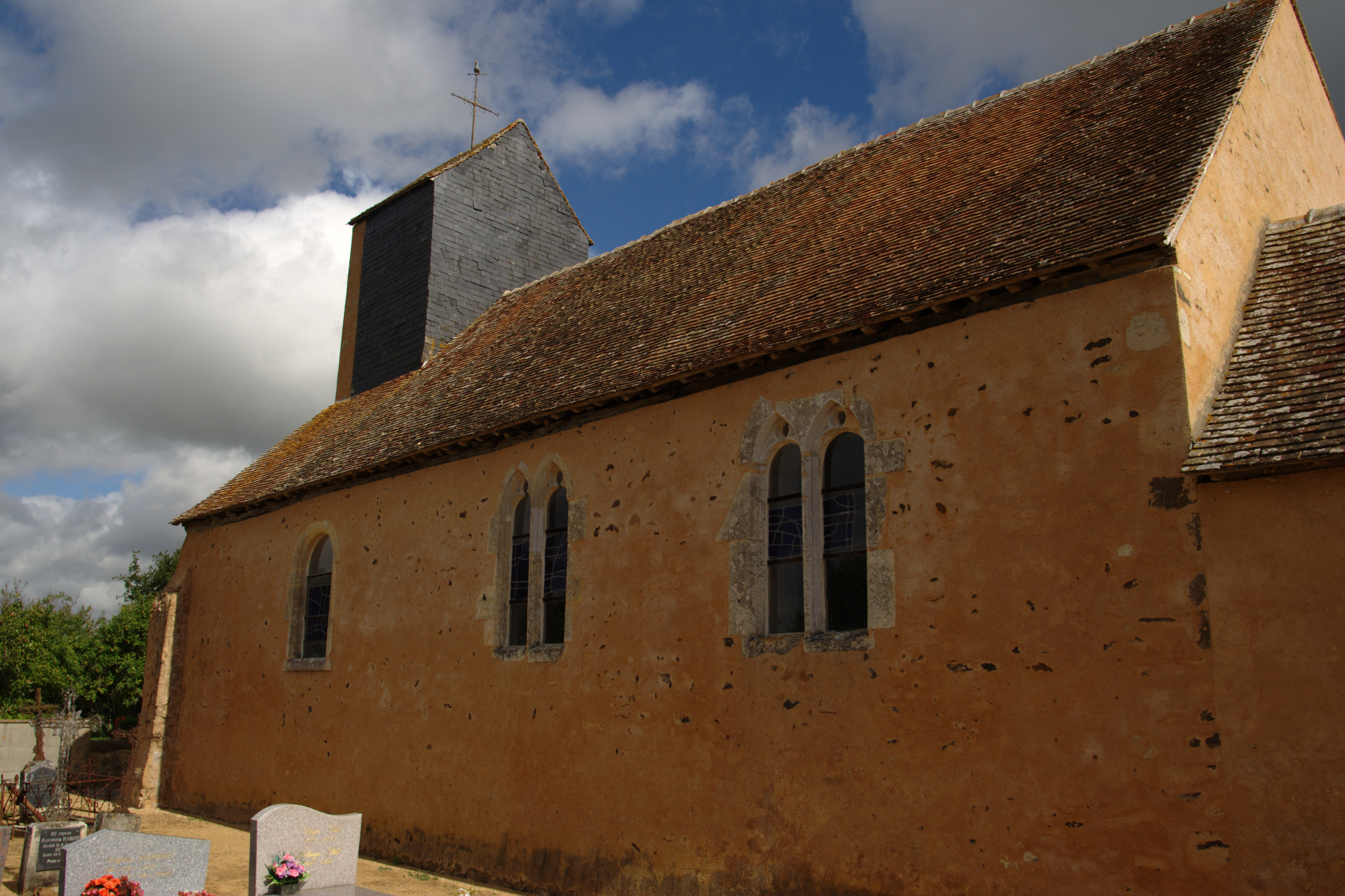
- The church of Saint-Pierre
- Location of Terrehault
- Location within France Location within Pays de la Loire
- Coordinates: 48°12′18″N 0°24′11″E
- Country: France
- Region: Pays de la Loire
- Department: Sarthe
- Arrondissement: Mamers
- Canton: Bonnétable
- Intercommunality: Maine Saosnois

Government
  - Mayor (2020–2026): Gaëlle Tison
- Area^{1}: 5.8 km^{2} (2.2 sq mi)
- Population (2023): 139
  - Density: 24/km^{2} (62/sq mi)
- Time zone: UTC+01:00 (CET)
  - Summer (DST): UTC+02:00 (CEST)
- INSEE/Postal code: 72352 /72110
- ^{1} French Land Register data, which excludes lakes, ponds, glaciers > 1 km^{2} (0.386 sq mi or 247 acres) and river estuaries.

Terrehault is a commune in the Sarthe department in the region of Pays de la Loire in north-western France.

== See also ==
- Communes of the Sarthe department
