= Joué-l'Abbé =

- Commune
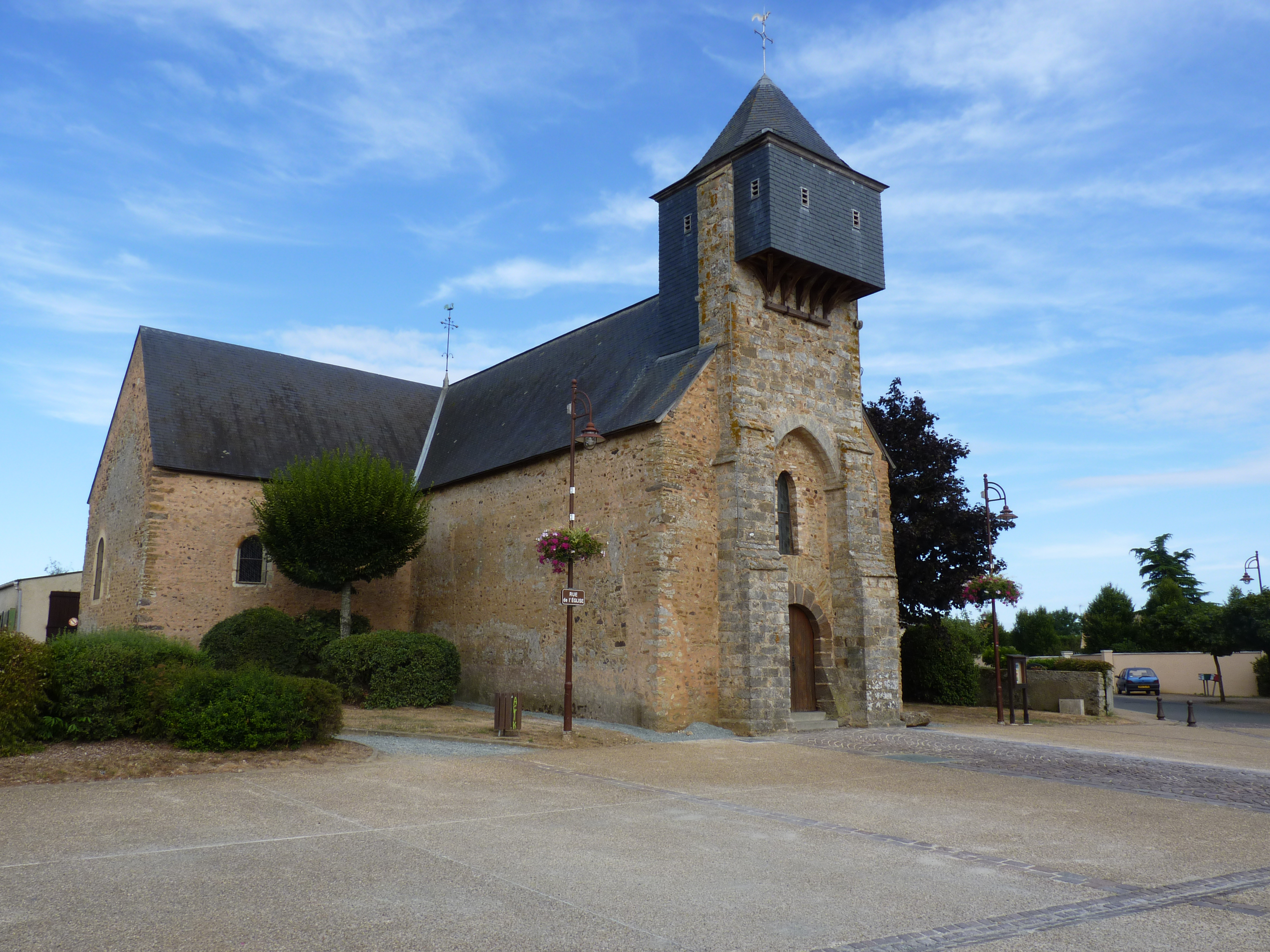
- The church of Saint-Denis, in Joué-l'Abbé
- Location of Joué-l'Abbé
- Location within France Location within Pays de la Loire
- Coordinates: 48°06′40″N 0°13′06″E
- Country: France
- Region: Pays de la Loire
- Department: Sarthe
- Arrondissement: Le Mans
- Canton: Bonnétable
- Intercommunality: Maine Cœur de Sarthe

Government
  - Mayor (2020–2026): Magali Lainé
- Area^{1}: 10.39 km^{2} (4.01 sq mi)
- Highest elevation: 95 m (312 ft)
- Lowest elevation: 52 m (171 ft)
- Population (2023): 1,267
  - Density: 121.9/km^{2} (315.8/sq mi)
- Demonym(s): Joyeu, Joyeuse
- Time zone: UTC+01:00 (CET)
  - Summer (DST): UTC+02:00 (CEST)
- INSEE/Postal code: 72150 /72380
- ^{1} French Land Register data, which excludes lakes, ponds, glaciers > 1 km^{2} (0.386 sq mi or 247 acres) and river estuaries.

Joué-l'Abbé (French pronunciation: [ʒwe labe]) is a commune in the Sarthe department in the region of Pays de la Loire in north-western France.

== See also ==
- Communes of the Sarthe department
