= Canton of Bonnétable =

Coordinates: 48.18°N 0.43°E

The canton of Bonnétable is an administrative division of the Sarthe department, northwestern France. Its borders were modified at the French canton reorganisation which came into effect in March 2015. Its seat is in Bonnétable.

It consists of the following communes:

1. Ballon-Saint-Mars
2. La Bazoge
3. Beaufay
4. Bonnétable
5. Briosne-lès-Sables
6. Courcebœufs
7. Courcemont
8. Courcival
9. La Guierche
10. Jauzé
11. Joué-l'Abbé
12. Montbizot
13. Neuville-sur-Sarthe
14. Nogent-le-Bernard
15. Rouperroux-le-Coquet
16. Sainte-Jamme-sur-Sarthe
17. Saint-Georges-du-Rosay
18. Saint-Jean-d'Assé
19. Saint-Pavace
20. Souillé
21. Souligné-sous-Ballon
22. Teillé
23. Terrehault
