= Nogent-le-Bernard =

- Commune
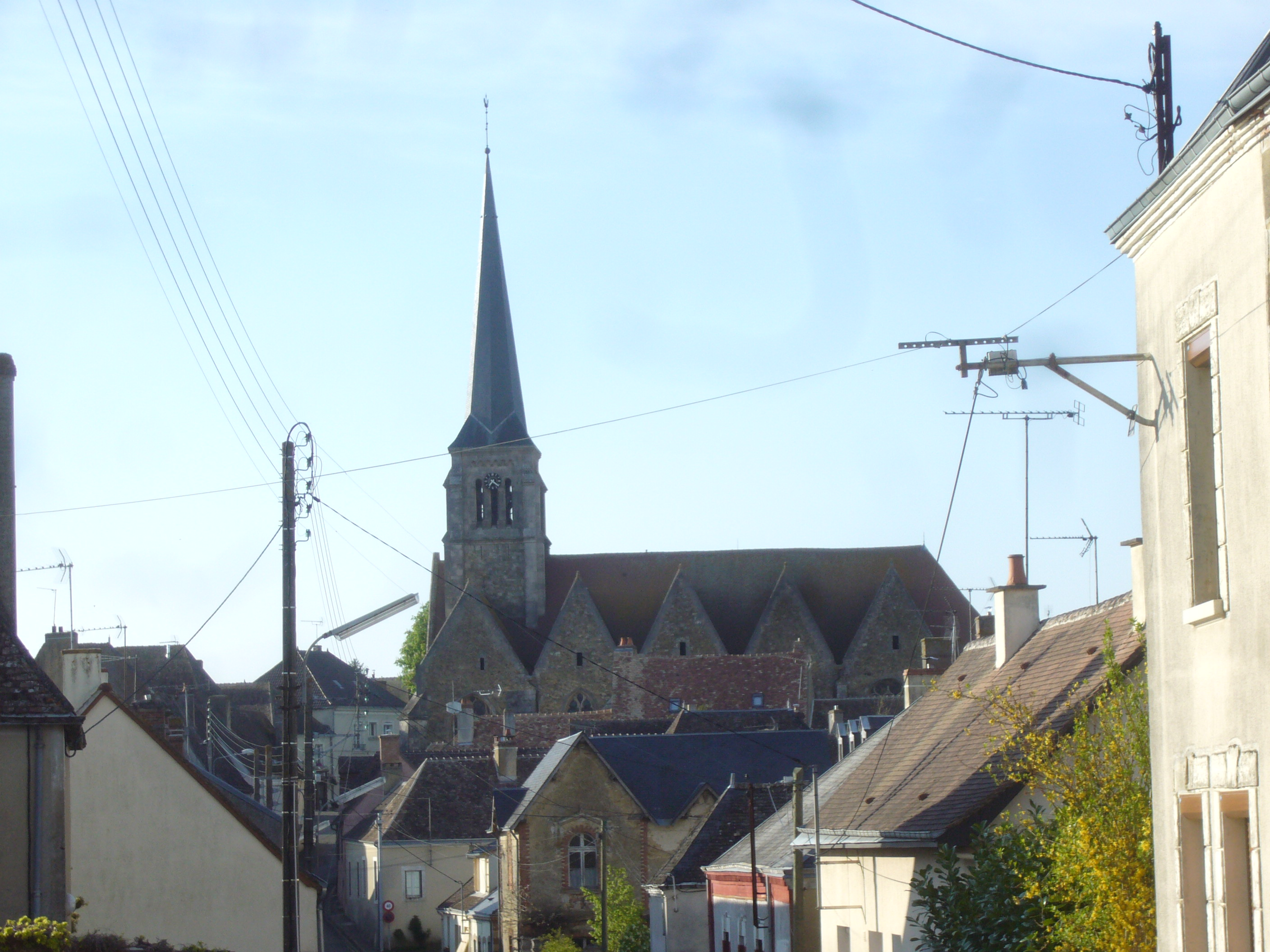
- The church of Saint-Jouin-de-Marnes

- Coat of arms
- Location of Nogent-le-Bernard
- Location within France Location within Pays de la Loire
- Coordinates: 48°14′09″N 0°29′29″E
- Country: France
- Region: Pays de la Loire
- Department: Sarthe
- Arrondissement: Mamers
- Canton: Bonnétable
- Intercommunality: Maine Saosnois

Government
  - Mayor (2020–2026): Alain Le Bray
- Area^{1}: 30.26 km^{2} (11.68 sq mi)
- Highest elevation: 196 m (643 ft)
- Lowest elevation: 75 m (246 ft)
- Population (2023): 864
  - Density: 28.6/km^{2} (74.0/sq mi)
- Time zone: UTC+01:00 (CET)
  - Summer (DST): UTC+02:00 (CEST)
- INSEE/Postal code: 72220 /72580
- ^{1} French Land Register data, which excludes lakes, ponds, glaciers > 1 km^{2} (0.386 sq mi or 247 acres) and river estuaries.

Nogent-le-Bernard is a commune in the Sarthe department in the region of Pays de la Loire in north-western France.

== See also ==
- Communes of the Sarthe department
