= Saint-Georges-du-Rosay =

- Commune
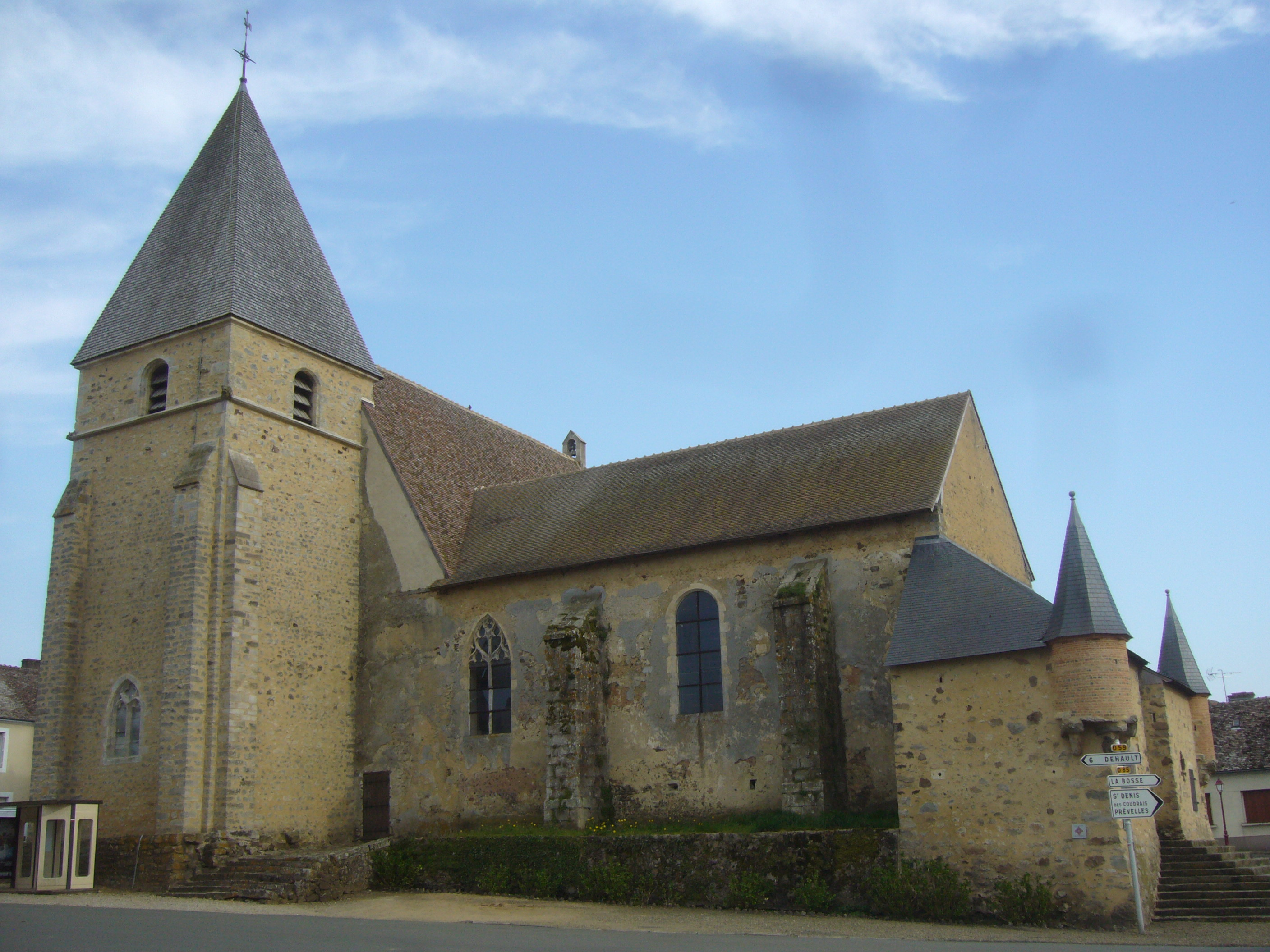
- The church of Saint-Georges-du-Rosay
- Location of Saint-Georges-du-Rosay
- Location within France Location within Pays de la Loire
- Coordinates: 48°12′03″N 0°30′10″E
- Country: France
- Region: Pays de la Loire
- Department: Sarthe
- Arrondissement: Mamers
- Canton: Bonnétable
- Intercommunality: Maine Saosnois

Government
  - Mayor (2020–2026): Annick Dutertre
- Area^{1}: 17.31 km^{2} (6.68 sq mi)
- Highest elevation: 169 m (554 ft)
- Lowest elevation: 112 m (367 ft)
- Population (2023): 452
  - Density: 26.1/km^{2} (67.6/sq mi)
- Time zone: UTC+01:00 (CET)
  - Summer (DST): UTC+02:00 (CEST)
- INSEE/Postal code: 72281 /72110
- ^{1} French Land Register data, which excludes lakes, ponds, glaciers > 1 km^{2} (0.386 sq mi or 247 acres) and river estuaries.

Saint-Georges-du-Rosay (French pronunciation: [sɛ̃ ʒɔʁʒ dy ʁozɛ]) is a commune in the Sarthe department in the region of Pays de la Loire in north-western France.

== See also ==
- Communes of the Sarthe department
