= La Guierche =

- Commune
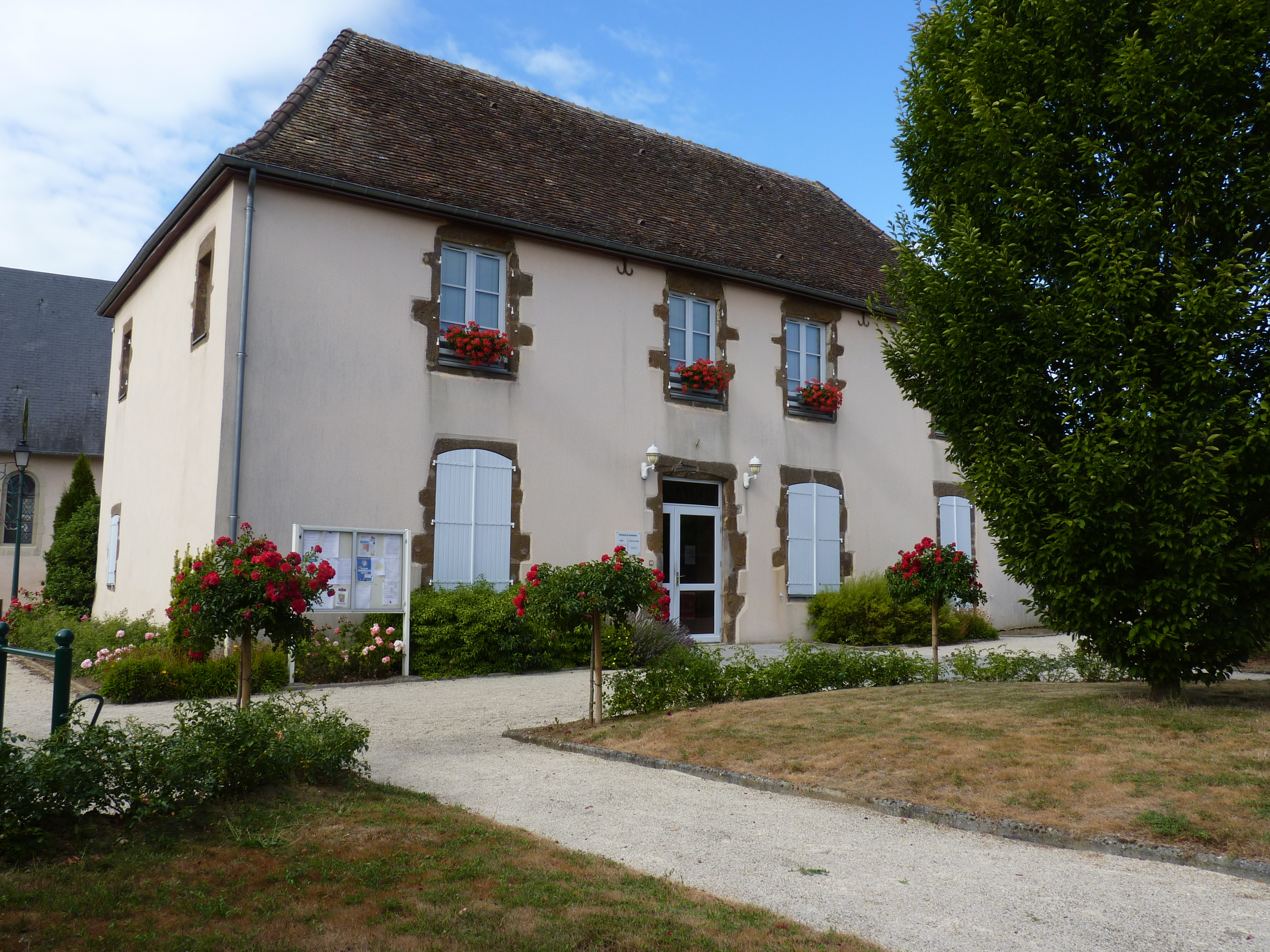
- The town hall of La Guierche
- Location of La Guierche
- Location within France Location within Pays de la Loire
- Coordinates: 48°06′53″N 0°11′43″E
- Country: France
- Region: Pays de la Loire
- Department: Sarthe
- Arrondissement: Le Mans
- Canton: Bonnétable
- Intercommunality: Maine Cœur de Sarthe

Government
  - Mayor (2020–2026): Eric Bourge
- Area^{1}: 7.88 km^{2} (3.04 sq mi)
- Highest elevation: 77 m (253 ft)
- Lowest elevation: 48 m (157 ft)
- Population (2023): 1,300
  - Density: 160/km^{2} (430/sq mi)
- Demonym(s): Guierchois, Guierchoise
- Time zone: UTC+01:00 (CET)
  - Summer (DST): UTC+02:00 (CEST)
- INSEE/Postal code: 72147 /72380
- ^{1} French Land Register data, which excludes lakes, ponds, glaciers > 1 km^{2} (0.386 sq mi or 247 acres) and river estuaries.

La Guierche (French pronunciation: [la ɡjɛʁʃ]) is a commune in the Sarthe department in the region of Pays de la Loire in north-western France.

== See also ==
- Communes of the Sarthe department
