= Courcebœufs =

- Commune
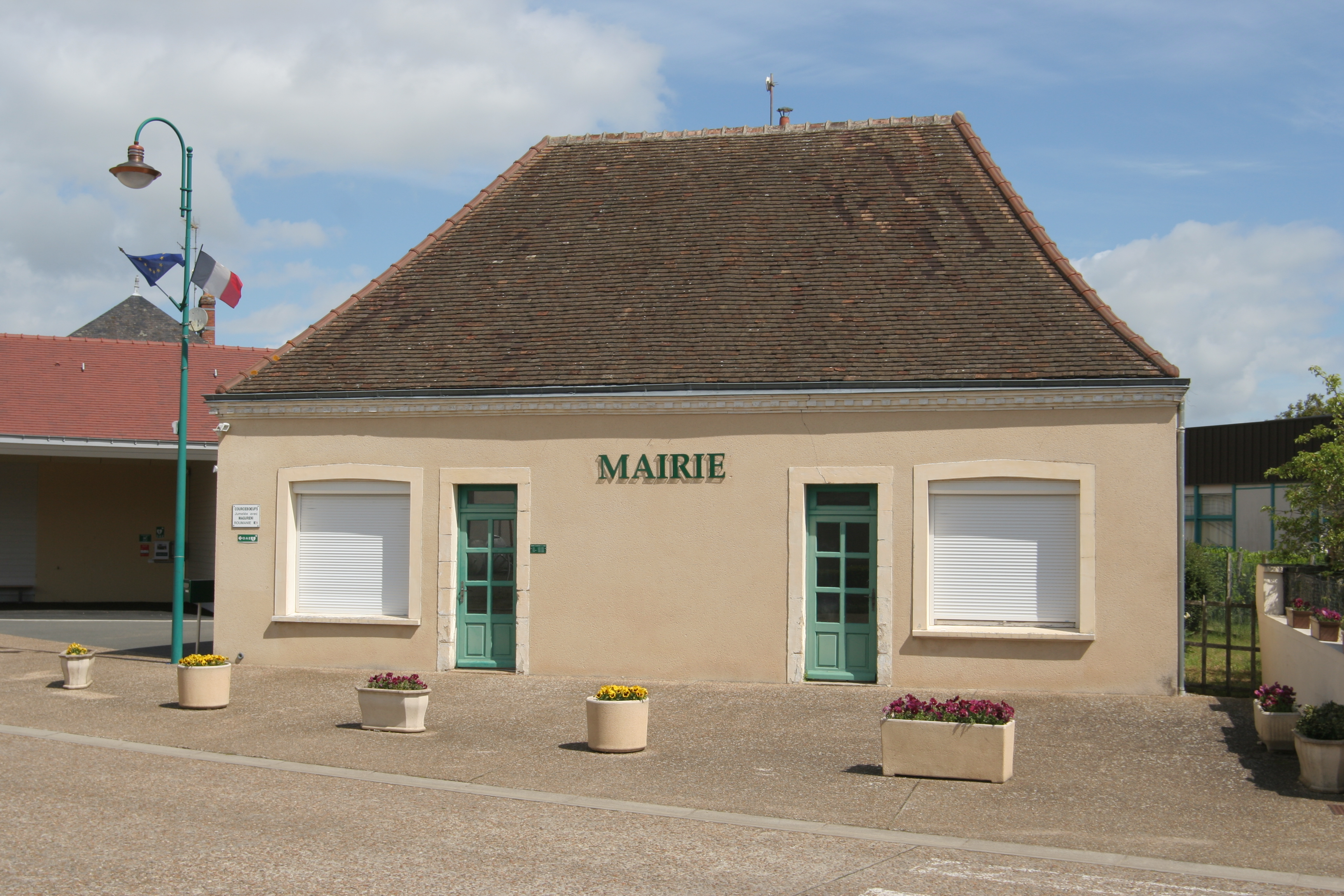
- Town hall
- Location of Courcebœufs
- Location within France Location within Pays de la Loire
- Coordinates: 48°08′18″N 0°17′18″E
- Country: France
- Region: Pays de la Loire
- Department: Sarthe
- Arrondissement: Le Mans
- Canton: Bonnétable
- Intercommunality: Maine Cœur de Sarthe

Government
  - Mayor (2020–2026): Dominique Dorizon
- Area^{1}: 16.83 km^{2} (6.50 sq mi)
- Highest elevation: 103 m (338 ft)
- Lowest elevation: 59 m (194 ft)
- Population (2023): 640
  - Density: 38/km^{2} (98/sq mi)
- Demonym(s): Courcebœusien, Courcebœusienne
- Time zone: UTC+01:00 (CET)
  - Summer (DST): UTC+02:00 (CEST)
- INSEE/Postal code: 72099 /72290
- ^{1} French Land Register data, which excludes lakes, ponds, glaciers > 1 km^{2} (0.386 sq mi or 247 acres) and river estuaries.

Courcebœufs (French pronunciation: [kuʁsəbœf]) is a commune in the Sarthe department in the Pays de la Loire region in north-western France.

== See also ==
- Communes of the Sarthe department
