= Sargé-lès-le-Mans =

- Commune
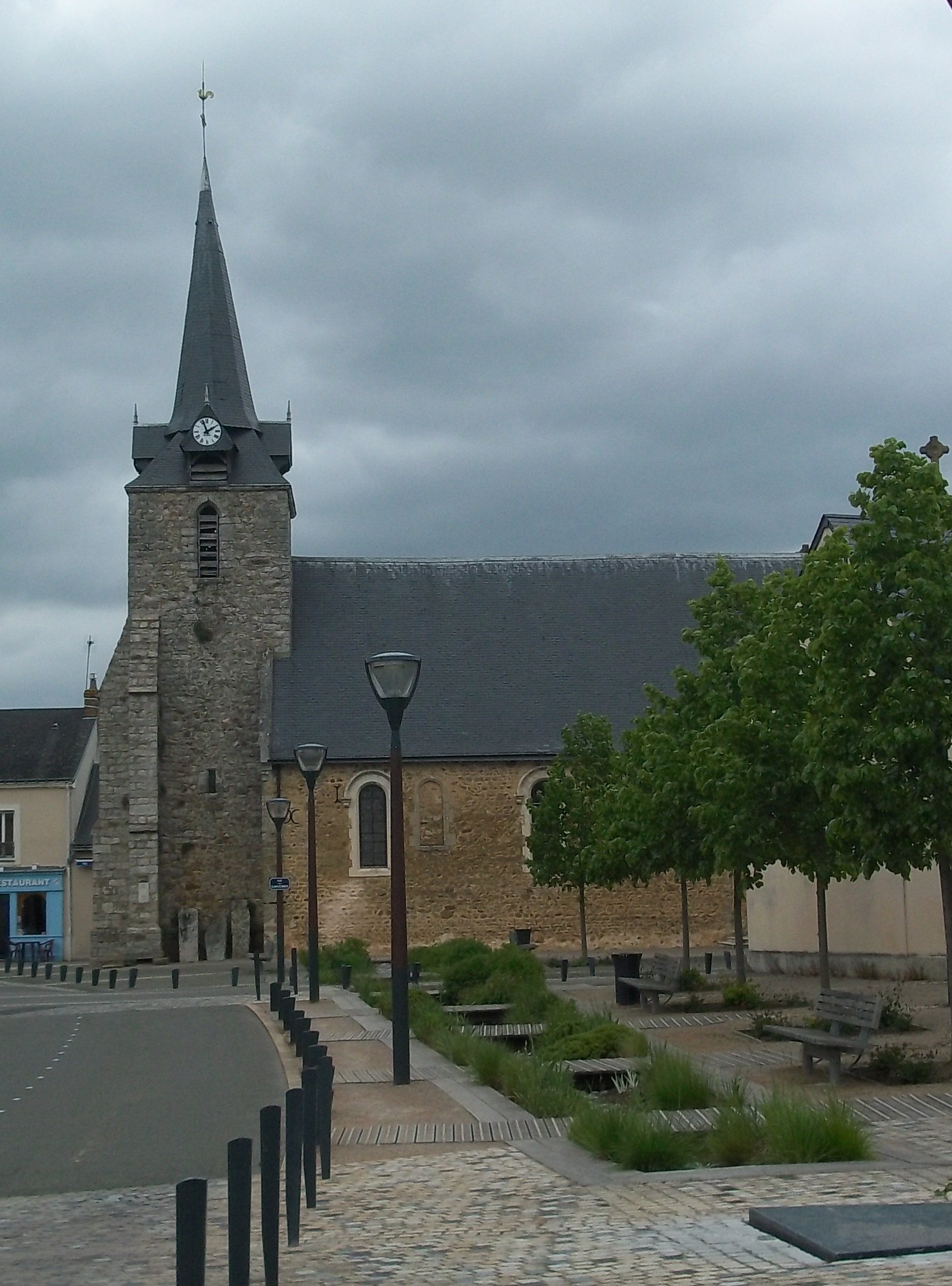
- The church of Saint-Aubin
- Location of Sargé-lès-le-Mans
- Location within France Location within Pays de la Loire
- Coordinates: 48°01′59″N 0°14′26″E
- Country: France
- Region: Pays de la Loire
- Department: Sarthe
- Arrondissement: Le Mans
- Canton: Changé
- Intercommunality: Le Mans Métropole

Government
  - Mayor (2020–2026): Marcel Mortreau
- Area^{1}: 13.65 km^{2} (5.27 sq mi)
- Highest elevation: 126 m (413 ft)
- Lowest elevation: 59 m (194 ft)
- Population (2023): 3,851
  - Density: 282.1/km^{2} (730.7/sq mi)
- Demonym(s): Sargéen, Sargéenne
- Time zone: UTC+01:00 (CET)
  - Summer (DST): UTC+02:00 (CEST)
- INSEE/Postal code: 72328 /72190
- ^{1} French Land Register data, which excludes lakes, ponds, glaciers > 1 km^{2} (0.386 sq mi or 247 acres) and river estuaries.

Sargé-lès-le-Mans (French pronunciation: [saʁʒe lɛ lə mɑ̃], literally Sargé near Le Mans) is a commune in the Sarthe department in the region of Pays de la Loire in north-western France.

== Population ==
Historical population
Year	Pop.	±% p.a.
1968	1,031	—
1975	1,936	+9.42%
1982	2,418	+3.23%
1990	2,870	+2.17%
1999	3,481	+2.17%
2007	3,605	+0.44%
2012	3,537	−0.38%
2017	3,614	+0.43%
2023	3,851	+1.06%
Source: INSEE

== See also ==
- Communes of the Sarthe department
