= Souillé =

- Commune
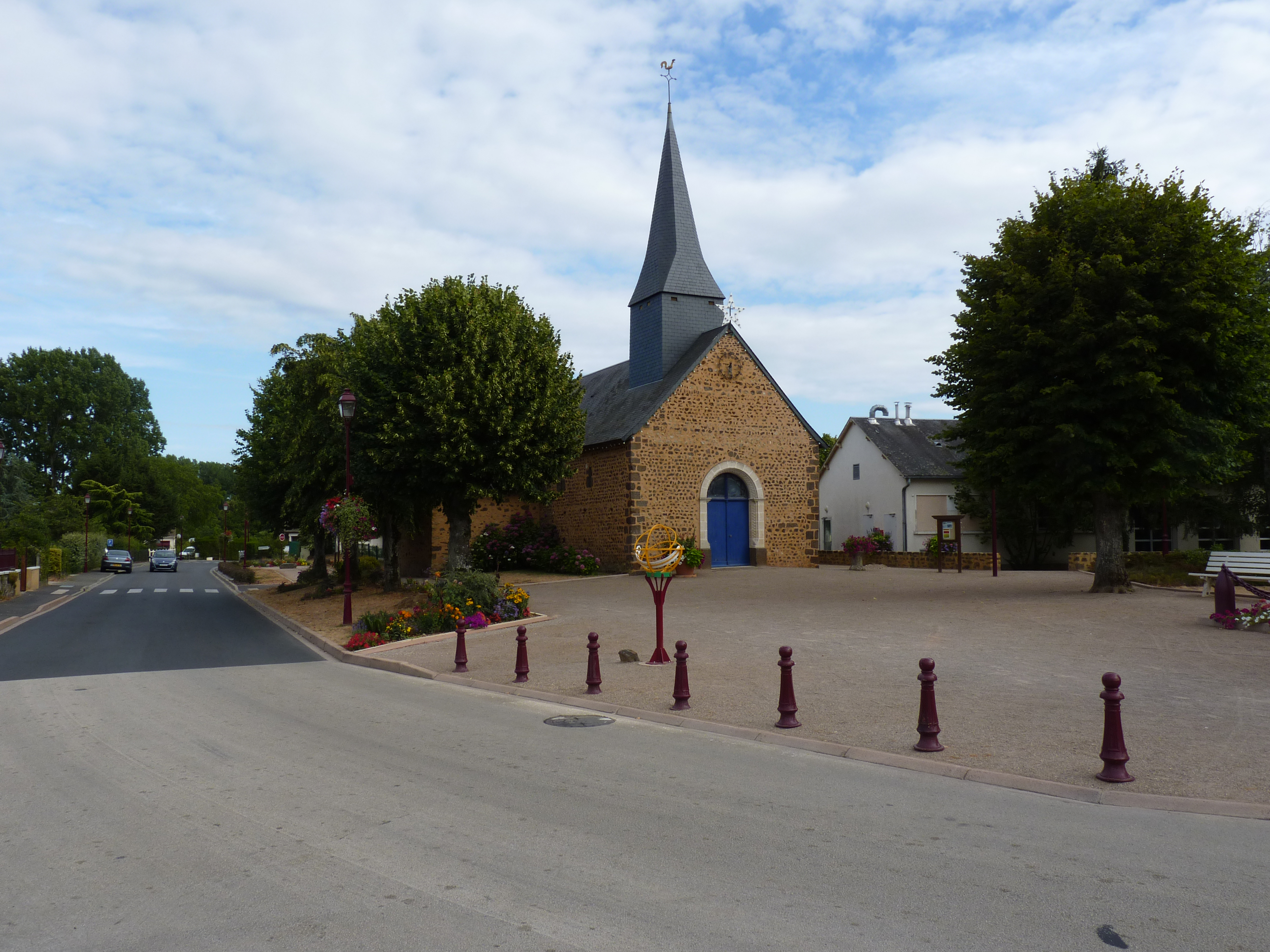
- The church of Saint-Martin
- Location of Souillé
- Location within France Location within Pays de la Loire
- Coordinates: 48°07′12″N 0°11′00″E
- Country: France
- Region: Pays de la Loire
- Department: Sarthe
- Arrondissement: Le Mans
- Canton: Bonnétable

Government
  - Mayor (2020–2026): Catherine Chaligné
- Area^{1}: 4.57 km^{2} (1.76 sq mi)
- Highest elevation: 87 m (285 ft)
- Lowest elevation: 49 m (161 ft)
- Population (2023): 797
  - Density: 174/km^{2} (452/sq mi)
- Demonym(s): Souilléen, Souilléenne
- Time zone: UTC+01:00 (CET)
  - Summer (DST): UTC+02:00 (CEST)
- INSEE/Postal code: 72338 /72380
- ^{1} French Land Register data, which excludes lakes, ponds, glaciers > 1 km^{2} (0.386 sq mi or 247 acres) and river estuaries.

Souillé (French pronunciation: [suje]) is a commune in the Sarthe department in the region of Pays de la Loire in north-western France.

== See also ==
- Communes of the Sarthe department
