= Montbizot =

- Commune
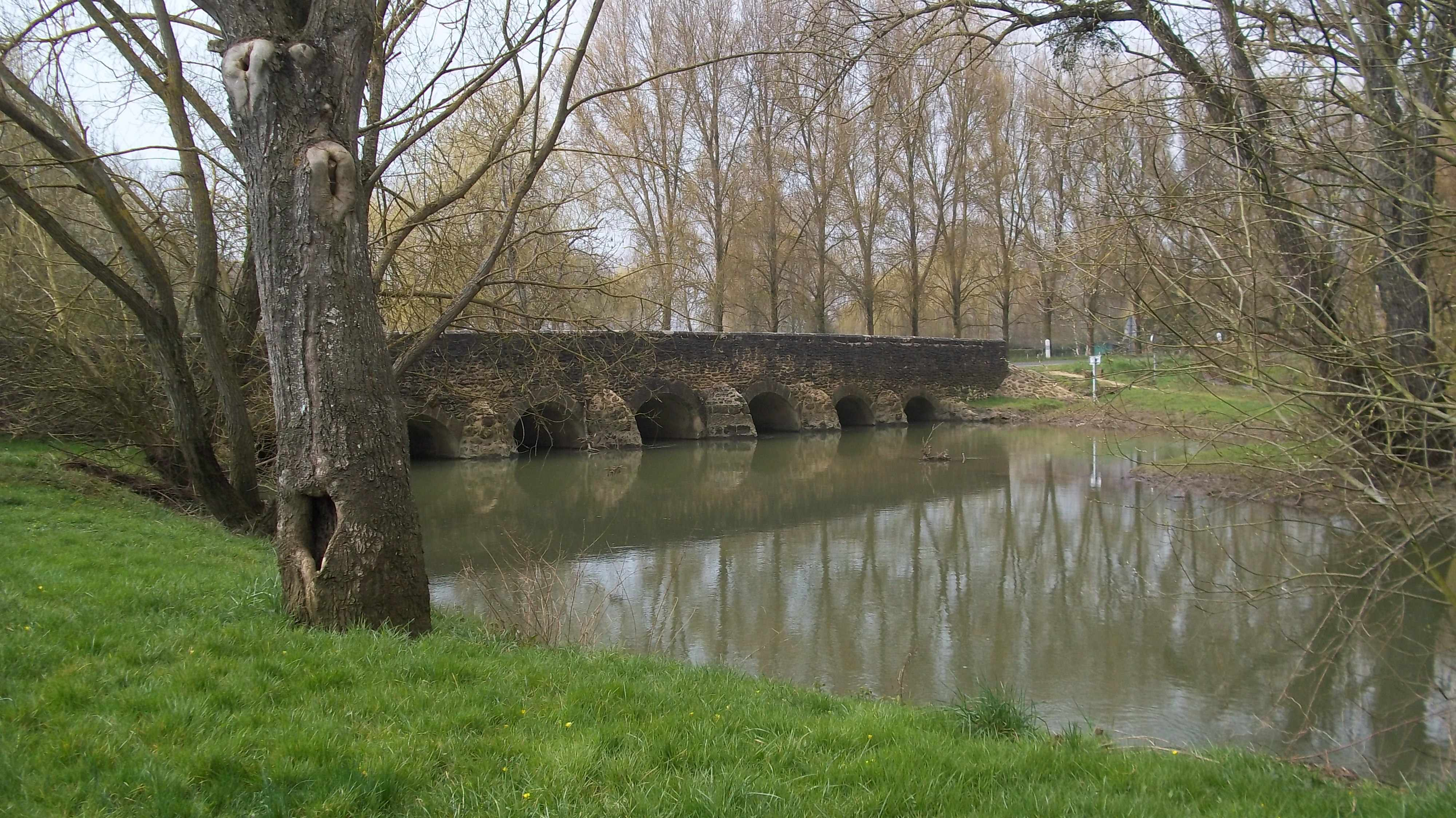
- The Orne saosnoise in Montbizot
- Location of Montbizot
- Location within France Location within Pays de la Loire
- Coordinates: 48°08′52″N 0°11′01″E
- Country: France
- Region: Pays de la Loire
- Department: Sarthe
- Arrondissement: Le Mans
- Canton: Bonnétable
- Intercommunality: Maine Cœur de Sarthe

Government
  - Mayor (2020–2026): Alain Besnier
- Area^{1}: 11.38 km^{2} (4.39 sq mi)
- Highest elevation: 91 m (299 ft)
- Lowest elevation: 49 m (161 ft)
- Population (2023): 1,841
  - Density: 161.8/km^{2} (419.0/sq mi)
- Demonym(s): Montbizotin, Montbizotine
- Time zone: UTC+01:00 (CET)
  - Summer (DST): UTC+02:00 (CEST)
- INSEE/Postal code: 72205 /72380
- ^{1} French Land Register data, which excludes lakes, ponds, glaciers > 1 km^{2} (0.386 sq mi or 247 acres) and river estuaries.

Montbizot (French pronunciation: [mɔ̃bizo]) is a commune in the Sarthe department in the region of Pays de la Loire in north-western France.

== See also ==
- Communes of the Sarthe department
