= Courcival =

- Commune
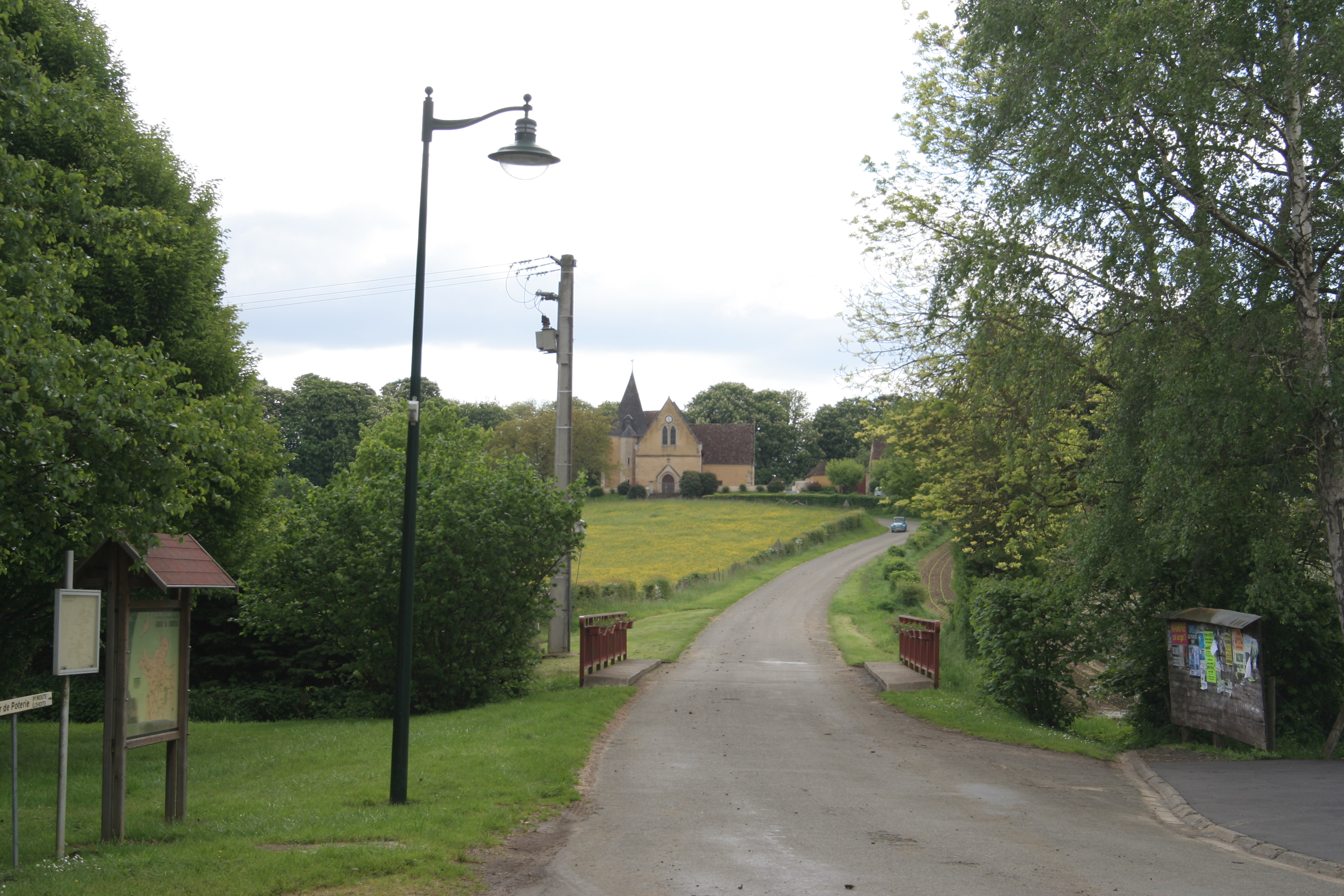
- A general view of Courcival
- Location of Courcival
- Location within France Location within Pays de la Loire
- Coordinates: 48°13′48″N 0°23′52″E
- Country: France
- Region: Pays de la Loire
- Department: Sarthe
- Arrondissement: Mamers
- Canton: Bonnétable
- Intercommunality: Maine Saosnois

Government
  - Mayor (2020–2026): Michel Couder
- Area^{1}: 8.64 km^{2} (3.34 sq mi)
- Highest elevation: 93 m (305 ft)
- Lowest elevation: 62 m (203 ft)
- Population (2023): 80
  - Density: 9.3/km^{2} (24/sq mi)
- Time zone: UTC+01:00 (CET)
  - Summer (DST): UTC+02:00 (CEST)
- INSEE/Postal code: 72102 /72110
- ^{1} French Land Register data, which excludes lakes, ponds, glaciers > 1 km^{2} (0.386 sq mi or 247 acres) and river estuaries.

Courcival (French pronunciation: [kuʁsival]) is a commune in the Sarthe department in the Pays de la Loire region in north-western France.

== See also ==
- Communes of the Sarthe department
