= La Bazoge, Sarthe =

La Bazoge
- Commune
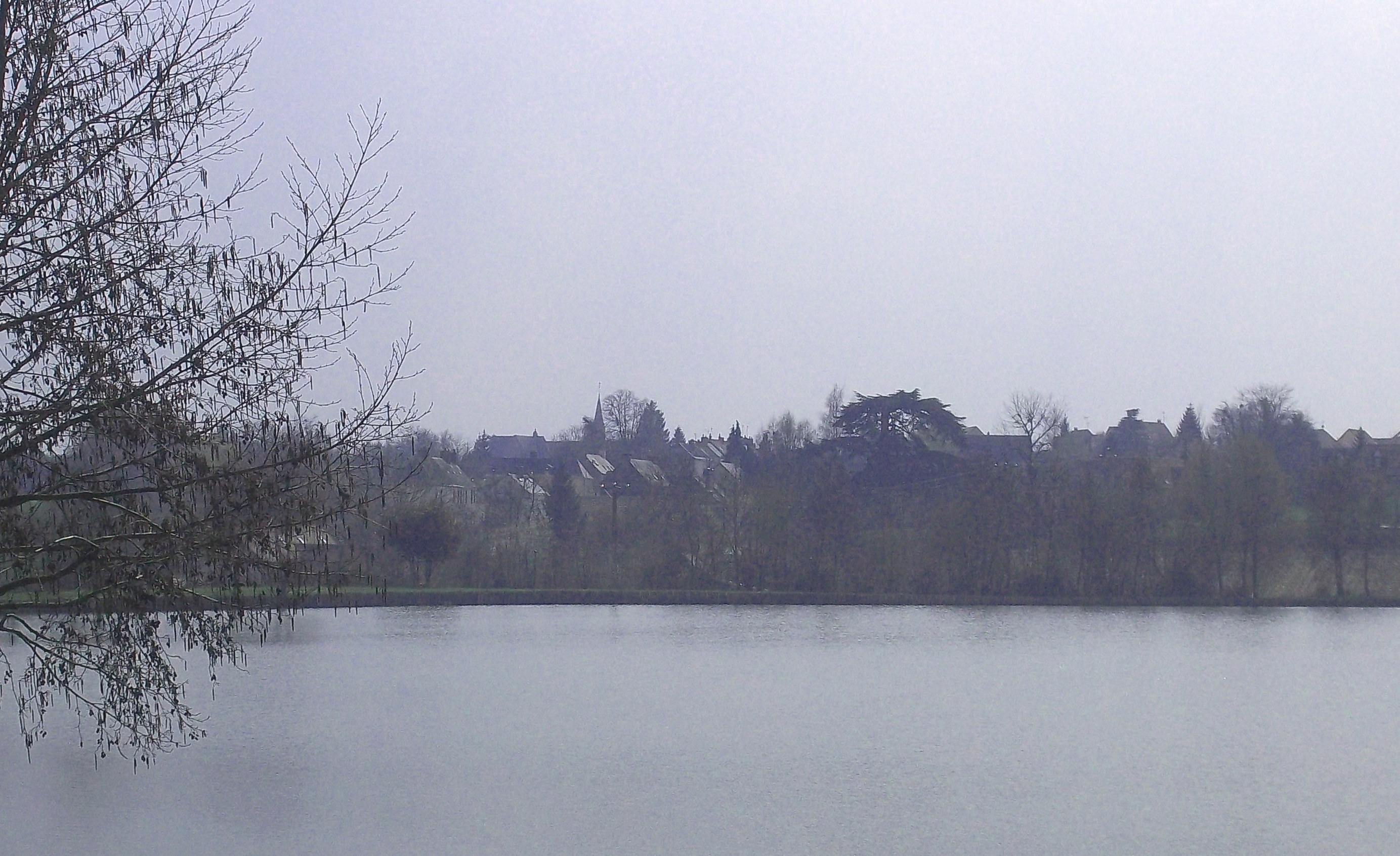
- From the lake
- Location of La Bazoge
- Location within France Location within Pays de la Loire
- Coordinates: 48°05′58″N 0°09′22″E
- Country: France
- Region: Pays de la Loire
- Department: Sarthe
- Arrondissement: Le Mans
- Canton: Bonnétable
- Intercommunality: Maine Cœur de Sarthe

Government
  - Mayor (2020–2026): Michel Lalande
- Area^{1}: 22.87 km^{2} (8.83 sq mi)
- Highest elevation: 148 m (486 ft)
- Lowest elevation: 49 m (161 ft)
- Population (2023): 3,796
  - Density: 166.0/km^{2} (429.9/sq mi)
- Demonym(s): Bazogien, Bazogienne
- Time zone: UTC+01:00 (CET)
  - Summer (DST): UTC+02:00 (CEST)
- INSEE/Postal code: 72024 /72650
- Website: www.labazoge72.fr
- ^{1} French Land Register data, which excludes lakes, ponds, glaciers > 1 km^{2} (0.386 sq mi or 247 acres) and river estuaries.

La Bazoge (French pronunciation: [la bazɔʒ]) is a commune in the Sarthe department in the region of Pays de la Loire in north-western France. It is twinned with the village of Bardney in Lincolnshire and Martfeld (Germany).

== Population ==
Historical population
Year	Pop.	±% p.a.
1968	1,319	—
1975	1,795	+4.50%
1982	2,366	+4.02%
1990	2,745	+1.87%
1999	2,860	+0.46%
2007	3,570	+2.81%
2012	3,653	+0.46%
2017	3,641	−0.07%
2023	3,796	+0.70%
Source: INSEE

== See also ==
- Communes of the Sarthe department
