= Champagné, Sarthe =

Champagné
- Commune
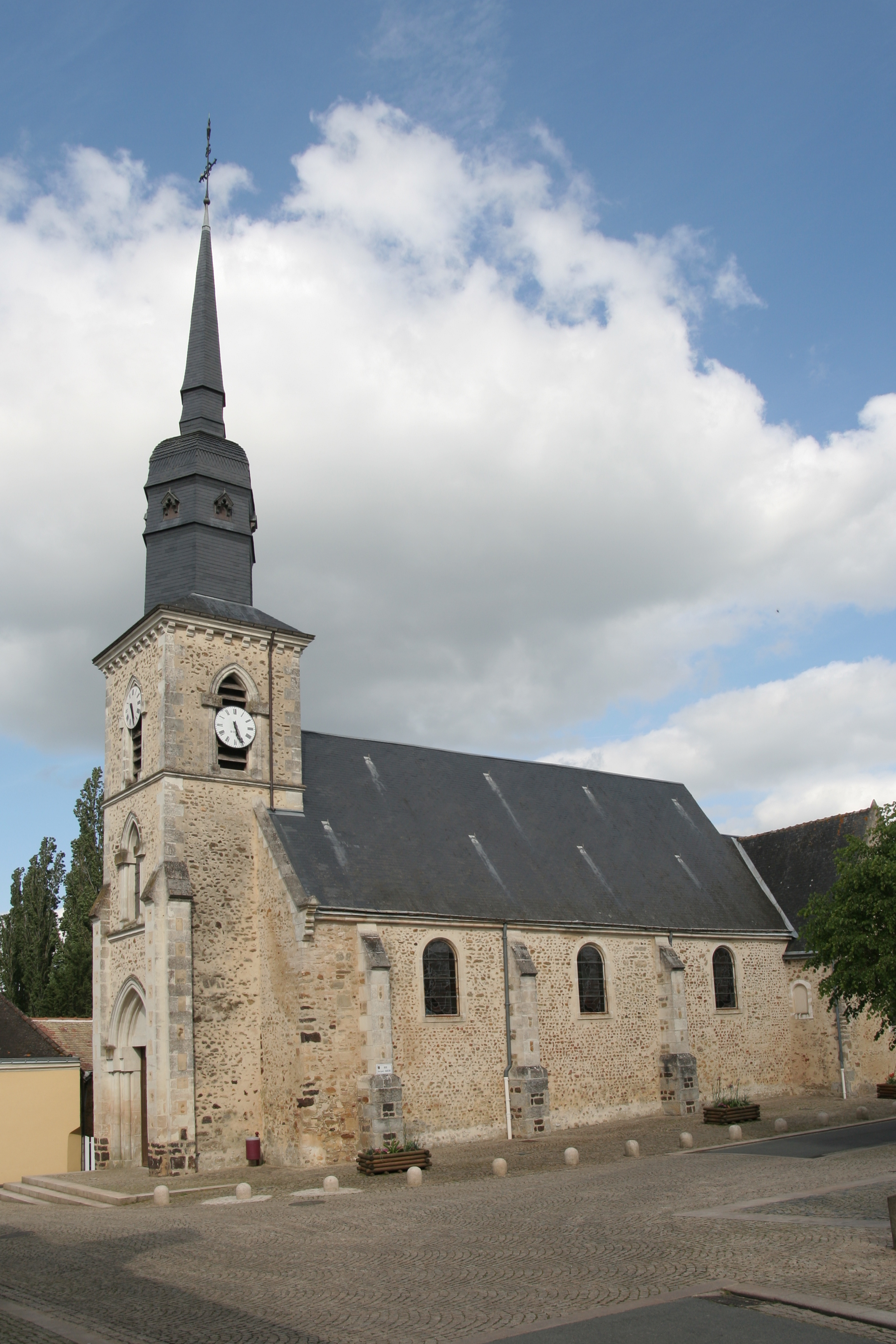
- The church of Saint-Désiré

- Coat of arms
- Location of Champagné
- Location within France Location within Pays de la Loire
- Coordinates: 48°01′22″N 0°19′58″E
- Country: France
- Region: Pays de la Loire
- Department: Sarthe
- Arrondissement: Le Mans
- Canton: Changé
- Intercommunality: Le Mans Métropole

Government
  - Mayor (2020–2026): Patrick Desmazières
- Area^{1}: 13.94 km^{2} (5.38 sq mi)
- Highest elevation: 126 m (413 ft)
- Lowest elevation: 52 m (171 ft)
- Population (2023): 3,666
  - Density: 263.0/km^{2} (681.1/sq mi)
- Demonym(s): Champagnéen, Champagnéenne
- Time zone: UTC+01:00 (CET)
  - Summer (DST): UTC+02:00 (CEST)
- INSEE/Postal code: 72054 /72470
- ^{1} French Land Register data, which excludes lakes, ponds, glaciers > 1 km^{2} (0.386 sq mi or 247 acres) and river estuaries.

Champagné is a commune in the Sarthe department in the region of Pays de la Loire in north-western France.

== Population ==
Historical population
Year	Pop.	±% p.a.
1968	2,234	—
1975	2,757	+3.05%
1982	3,333	+2.75%
1990	3,307	−0.10%
1999	3,294	−0.04%
2007	3,576	+1.03%
2012	3,819	+1.32%
2017	3,876	+0.30%
2023	3,666	−0.92%
Source: INSEE

== See also ==
- Communes of the Sarthe department
