= Teillé, Sarthe =

Teillé
- Commune
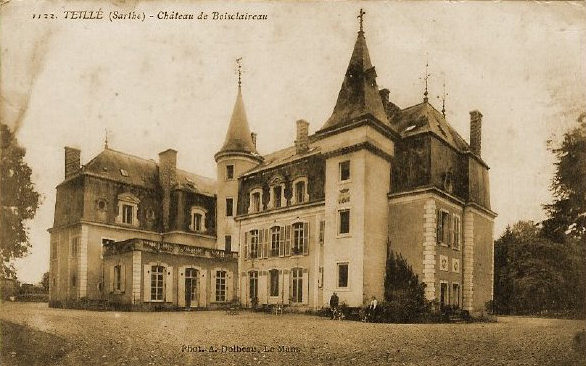
- The Château de Boisclaireau
- Location of Teillé
- Location within France Location within Pays de la Loire
- Coordinates: 48°10′57″N 0°11′21″E
- Country: France
- Region: Pays de la Loire
- Department: Sarthe
- Arrondissement: Le Mans
- Canton: Bonnétable
- Intercommunality: Maine Cœur de Sarthe

Government
  - Mayor (2020–2026): Michel Musset
- Area^{1}: 11.54 km^{2} (4.46 sq mi)
- Highest elevation: 103 m (338 ft)
- Lowest elevation: 52 m (171 ft)
- Population (2023): 543
  - Density: 47.1/km^{2} (122/sq mi)
- Demonym(s): Teillois, Teilloise
- Time zone: UTC+01:00 (CET)
  - Summer (DST): UTC+02:00 (CEST)
- INSEE/Postal code: 72349 /72290
- ^{1} French Land Register data, which excludes lakes, ponds, glaciers > 1 km^{2} (0.386 sq mi or 247 acres) and river estuaries.

Teillé (French pronunciation: [tɛje]) is a commune in the Sarthe department in the region of Pays de la Loire in north-western France.

== See also ==
- Communes of the Sarthe department
