= Château de Boisclaireau =

Gueroust family residence in France

Coordinates: 48°12′2″N 0°11′13″E

Château de Boisclaireau was the residence of the noble Gueroust family, who were the Counts of Boisclaireau, in Teillé, Sarthe, Pays de la Loire, France.

The castle hosted the Archduke Louis and his brother Johann, sons of Holy Roman Emperor Leopold II of Austria, during one of their trips to France.

== Gallery ==
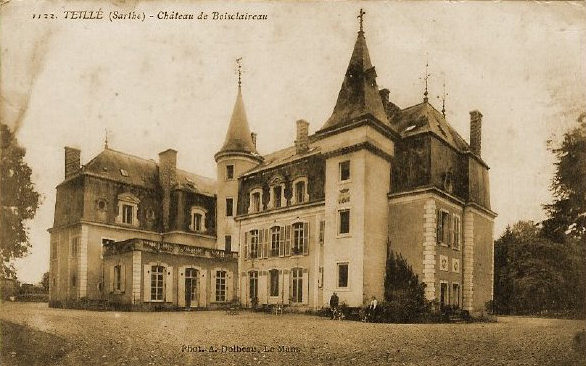

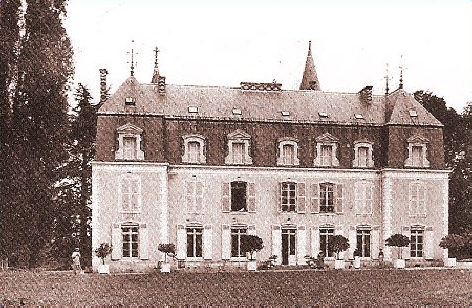

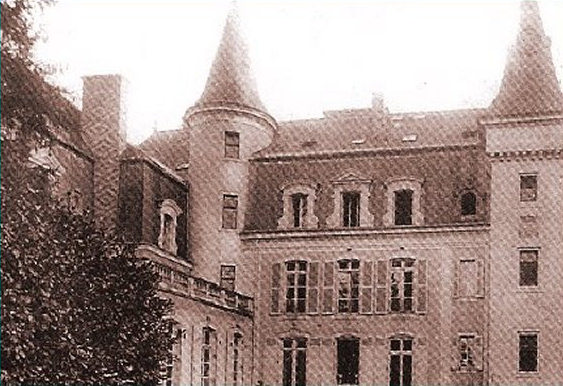
