= Brette-les-Pins =

- Commune
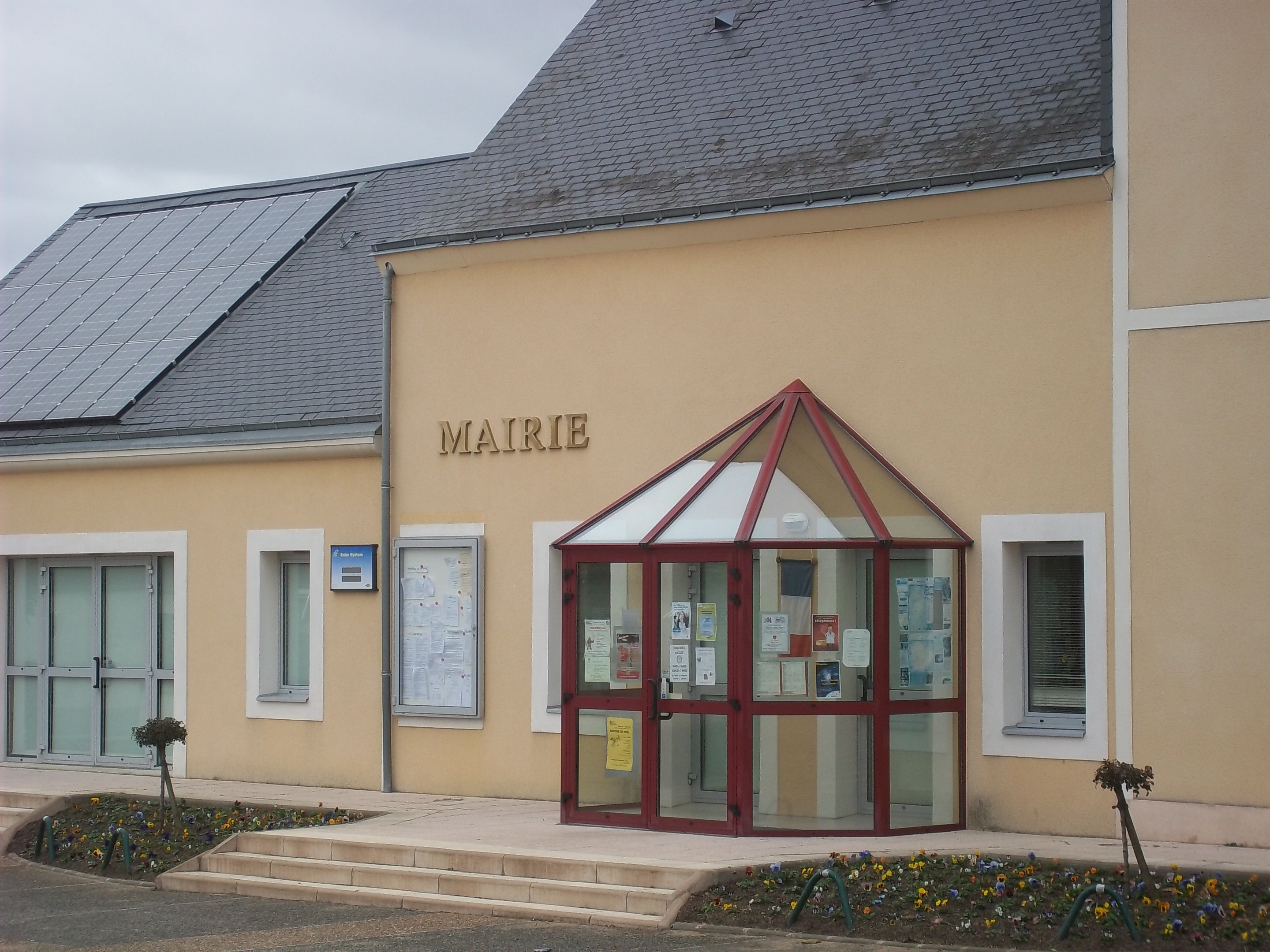
- Town hall
- Location of Brette-les-Pins
- Location within France Location within Pays de la Loire
- Coordinates: 47°54′47″N 0°20′08″E
- Country: France
- Region: Pays de la Loire
- Department: Sarthe
- Arrondissement: Le Mans
- Canton: Changé
- Intercommunality: CC du Sud Est Manceau

Government
  - Mayor (2020–2026): Stéphane Fouchard
- Area^{1}: 14.51 km^{2} (5.60 sq mi)
- Highest elevation: 139 m (456 ft)
- Lowest elevation: 61 m (200 ft)
- Population (2023): 2,131
  - Density: 146.9/km^{2} (380.4/sq mi)
- Demonym(s): Brettois, Brettoise
- Time zone: UTC+01:00 (CET)
  - Summer (DST): UTC+02:00 (CEST)
- INSEE/Postal code: 72047 /72250
- Website: www.brettelespins.fr
- ^{1} French Land Register data, which excludes lakes, ponds, glaciers > 1 km^{2} (0.386 sq mi or 247 acres) and river estuaries.

Brette-les-Pins (French pronunciation: [bʁɛt le pɛ̃]) is a commune in the Sarthe department in the region of Pays de la Loire in north-western France.

== Population ==
Historical population
Year	Pop.	±% p.a.
1968	1,176	—
1975	1,337	+1.85%
1982	1,352	+0.16%
1990	1,385	+0.30%
1999	1,491	+0.82%
2007	1,993	+3.69%
2012	2,152	+1.55%
2017	2,153	+0.01%
2023	2,131	−0.17%
Source: INSEE

== See also ==
- Communes of the Sarthe department
