= Sainte-Jamme-sur-Sarthe =

- Commune
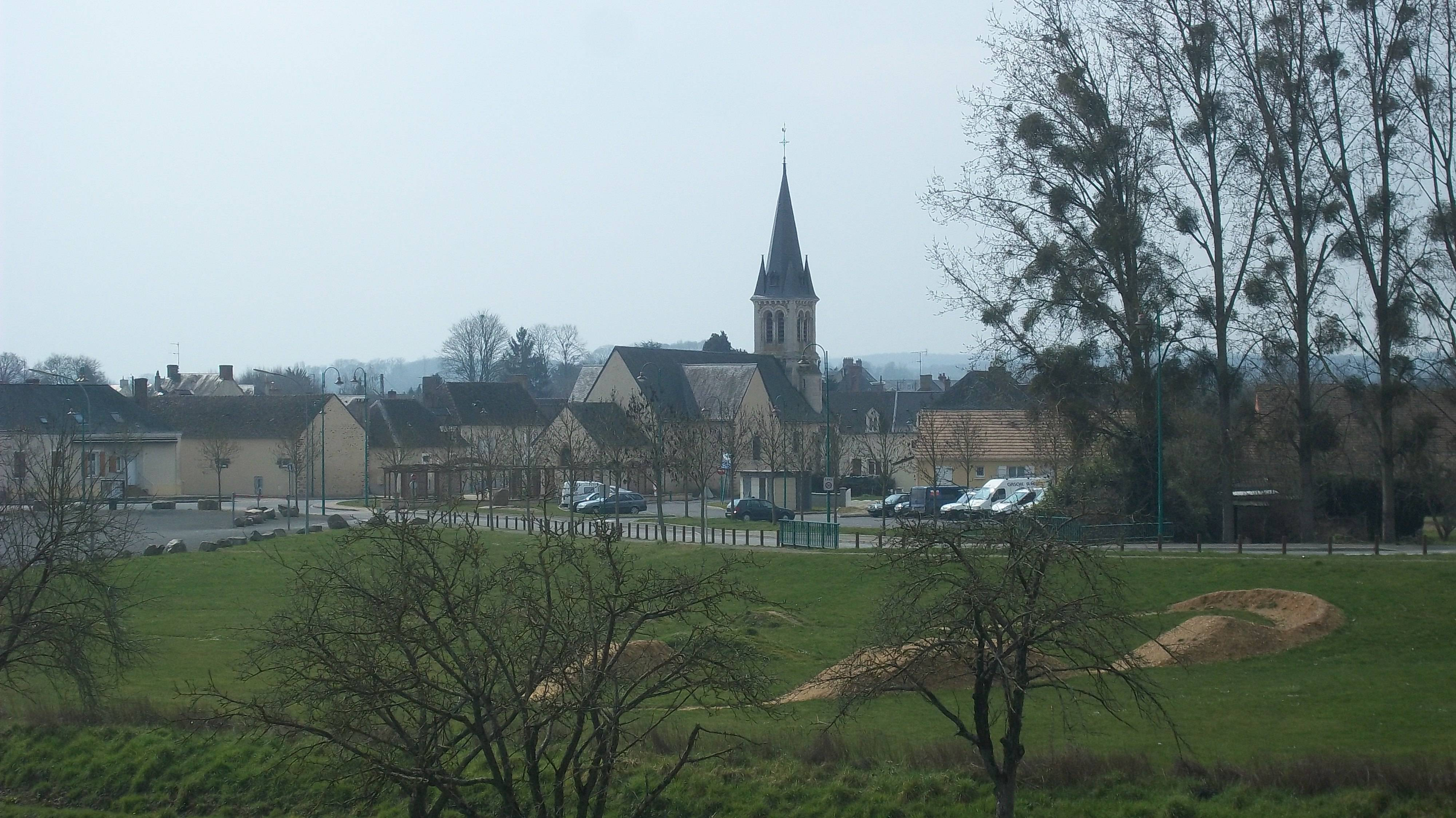
- The church of Sainte-Jamme-sur-Sarthe
- Location of Sainte-Jamme-sur-Sarthe
- Location within France Location within Pays de la Loire
- Coordinates: 48°08′37″N 0°10′10″E
- Country: France
- Region: Pays de la Loire
- Department: Sarthe
- Arrondissement: Le Mans
- Canton: Bonnétable
- Intercommunality: Maine Cœur de Sarthe

Government
  - Mayor (2020–2026): Jean-Luc Suhard
- Area^{1}: 8.43 km^{2} (3.25 sq mi)
- Highest elevation: 101 m (331 ft)
- Lowest elevation: 49 m (161 ft)
- Population (2023): 1,950
  - Density: 231/km^{2} (599/sq mi)
- Demonym(s): Saint-Jammois, Saint-Jammoise
- Time zone: UTC+01:00 (CET)
  - Summer (DST): UTC+02:00 (CEST)
- INSEE/Postal code: 72289 /72380
- ^{1} French Land Register data, which excludes lakes, ponds, glaciers > 1 km^{2} (0.386 sq mi or 247 acres) and river estuaries.

Sainte-Jamme-sur-Sarthe (French pronunciation: [sɛ̃t ʒam syʁ saʁt], literally Sainte-Jamme on Sarthe) is a commune in the Sarthe department in the region of Pays de la Loire in north-western France.

The area was host to a knighting tournament attended by William Marshal, 1st Earl Pembroke, in 1166.

== Population ==
Historical population
Year	Pop.	±% p.a.
1968	1,792	—
1975	1,769	−0.18%
1982	1,700	−0.57%
1990	1,640	−0.45%
1999	1,669	+0.19%
2007	2,019	+2.41%
2012	2,095	+0.74%
2017	2,051	−0.42%
2023	1,950	−0.84%
Source: INSEE

== See also ==
- Communes of the Sarthe department
