= Neuville-sur-Sarthe =

- Commune
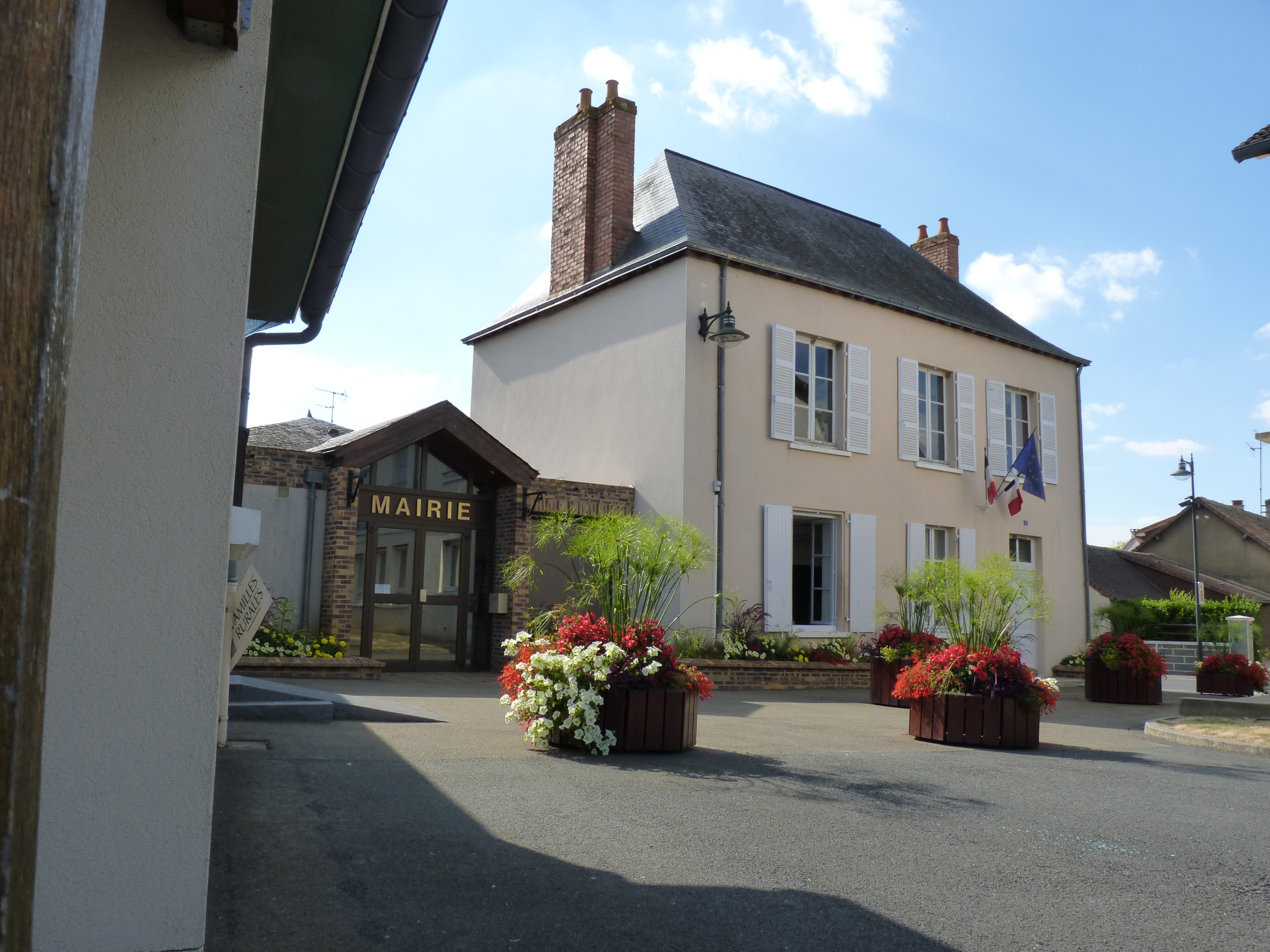
- The town hall of Neuville-sur-Sarthe
- Location of Neuville-sur-Sarthe
- Location within France Location within Pays de la Loire
- Coordinates: 48°04′34″N 0°11′20″E
- Country: France
- Region: Pays de la Loire
- Department: Sarthe
- Arrondissement: Le Mans
- Canton: Bonnétable
- Intercommunality: Maine Cœur de Sarthe

Government
  - Mayor (2020–2026): Véronique Cantin
- Area^{1}: 22.94 km^{2} (8.86 sq mi)
- Highest elevation: 123 m (404 ft)
- Lowest elevation: 42 m (138 ft)
- Population (2023): 2,463
  - Density: 107.4/km^{2} (278.1/sq mi)
- Demonym(s): Neuvillois, Neuvilloise
- Time zone: UTC+01:00 (CET)
  - Summer (DST): UTC+02:00 (CEST)
- INSEE/Postal code: 72217 /72190
- ^{1} French Land Register data, which excludes lakes, ponds, glaciers > 1 km^{2} (0.386 sq mi or 247 acres) and river estuaries.

Neuville-sur-Sarthe (French pronunciation: [nøvil syʁ saʁt]) is a commune in the Sarthe department in the region of Pays de la Loire in north-western France.

== Population ==
Historical population
Year	Pop.	±% p.a.
1968	1,070	—
1975	1,121	+0.67%
1982	1,906	+7.88%
1990	2,121	+1.34%
1999	2,221	+0.51%
2007	2,274	+0.30%
2012	2,368	+0.81%
2017	2,421	+0.44%
2023	2,463	+0.29%
Source: INSEE

== See also ==
- Communes of the Sarthe department
