= Beaufay =

- Commune
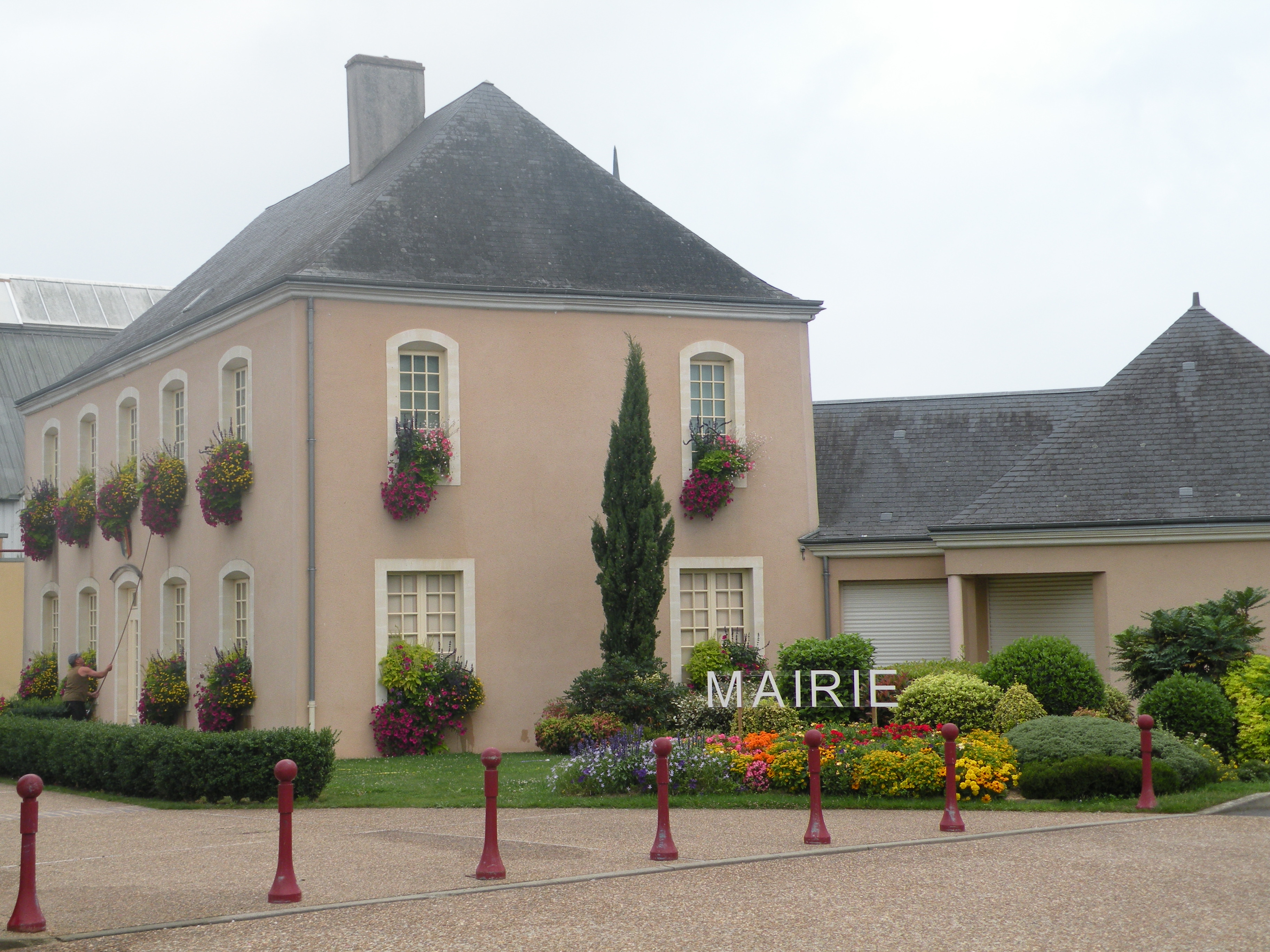
- Town hall
- Location of Beaufay
- Location within France Location within Pays de la Loire
- Coordinates: 48°08′52″N 0°21′47″E
- Country: France
- Region: Pays de la Loire
- Department: Sarthe
- Arrondissement: Mamers
- Canton: Bonnétable
- Intercommunality: Maine Saosnois

Government
  - Mayor (2020–2026): Géraldine Vogel
- Area^{1}: 23.87 km^{2} (9.22 sq mi)
- Highest elevation: 143 m (469 ft)
- Lowest elevation: 61 m (200 ft)
- Population (2023): 1,522
  - Density: 63.76/km^{2} (165.1/sq mi)
- Demonym(s): Belfaidien, Belfaidienne
- Time zone: UTC+01:00 (CET)
  - Summer (DST): UTC+02:00 (CEST)
- INSEE/Postal code: 72026 /72110
- ^{1} French Land Register data, which excludes lakes, ponds, glaciers > 1 km^{2} (0.386 sq mi or 247 acres) and river estuaries.

Beaufay (French pronunciation: [bofɛ]) is a commune in the Sarthe department in the region of Pays de la Loire in north-western France.

== Population ==
Historical population
Year	Pop.	±% p.a.
1968	1,156	—
1975	1,105	−0.64%
1982	1,103	−0.03%
1990	1,063	−0.46%
1999	1,103	+0.41%
2007	1,317	+2.24%
2012	1,402	+1.26%
2017	1,491	+1.24%
2023	1,522	+0.34%
Source: INSEE

== See also ==
- Communes of the Sarthe department
