= Courcemont =

- Commune
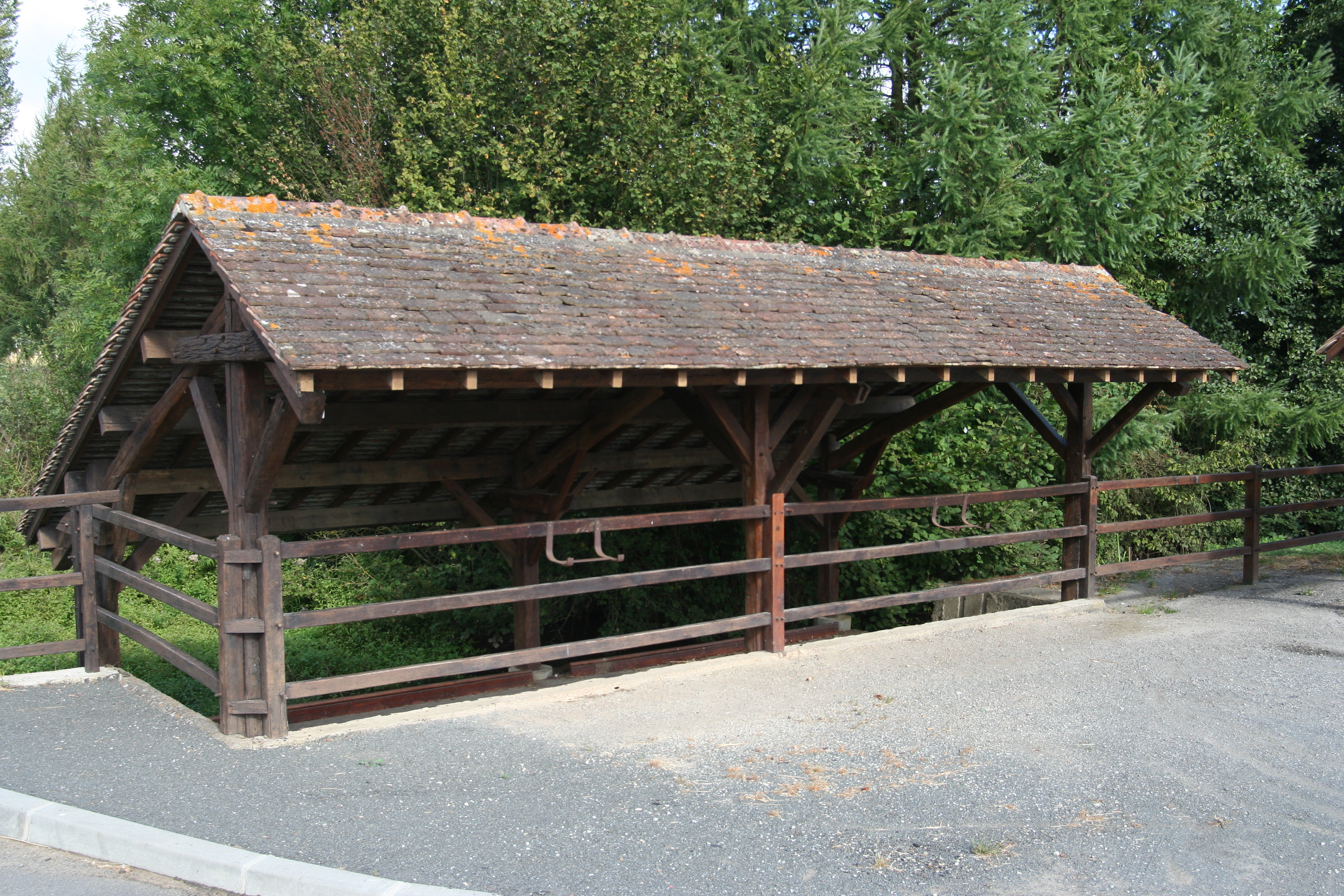
- The wash-house

- Coat of arms
- Location of Courcemont
- Location within France Location within Pays de la Loire
- Coordinates: 48°10′23″N 0°21′18″E
- Country: France
- Region: Pays de la Loire
- Department: Sarthe
- Arrondissement: Mamers
- Canton: Bonnétable
- Intercommunality: CC Maine Saosnois

Government
  - Mayor (2020–2026): Jean-Bernard Choplin
- Area^{1}: 19.26 km^{2} (7.44 sq mi)
- Highest elevation: 143 m (469 ft)
- Lowest elevation: 63 m (207 ft)
- Population (2023): 664
  - Density: 34.5/km^{2} (89.3/sq mi)
- Demonym(s): Courcemontais, Courcemontaise
- Time zone: UTC+01:00 (CET)
  - Summer (DST): UTC+02:00 (CEST)
- INSEE/Postal code: 72101 /72110
- ^{1} French Land Register data, which excludes lakes, ponds, glaciers > 1 km^{2} (0.386 sq mi or 247 acres) and river estuaries.

Courcemont (French pronunciation: [kuʁsəmɔ̃]) is a commune in the Sarthe department in the Pays de la Loire region in north-western France.

== See also ==
- Communes of the Sarthe department
