= Challes, Sarthe =

Challes
- Commune
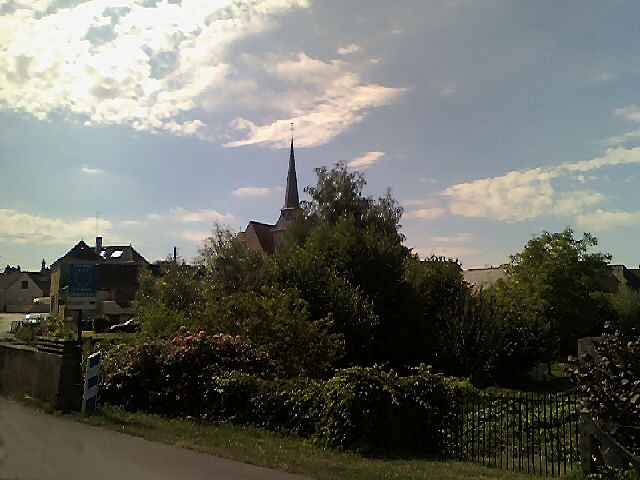
- View of the left bank of the Narais

- Coat of arms
- Location of Challes
- Location within France Location within Pays de la Loire
- Coordinates: 47°55′55″N 0°24′55″E
- Country: France
- Region: Pays de la Loire
- Department: Sarthe
- Arrondissement: Le Mans
- Canton: Changé
- Intercommunality: CC du Sud Est Manceau

Government
  - Mayor (2020–2026): Guy Fourmy
- Area^{1}: 25.83 km^{2} (9.97 sq mi)
- Highest elevation: 147 m (482 ft)
- Lowest elevation: 74 m (243 ft)
- Population (2023): 1,156
  - Density: 44.75/km^{2} (115.9/sq mi)
- Demonym(s): Challois, Challoise
- Time zone: UTC+01:00 (CET)
  - Summer (DST): UTC+02:00 (CEST)
- INSEE/Postal code: 72053 /72250
- ^{1} French Land Register data, which excludes lakes, ponds, glaciers > 1 km^{2} (0.386 sq mi or 247 acres) and river estuaries.

Challes (French pronunciation: [ʃal]) is a commune in the Sarthe department in the region of Pays de la Loire in north-western France.

== See also ==
- Communes of the Sarthe department
