= Belin =

Belin may refer to:

== People ==
- Belinus, called "the Great", a legendary 4th-century BC king of the Britons
- Albert Belin, French bishop and writer
- Augusto Belin, Argentinian writer and diplomat
- Bruno Belin, Croatian footballer
- Chuck Belin, American footballer
- David W. Belin, American businessman
- Édouard Belin, Swiss photographer
- Fred de Belin, Australian rugby footballer
- Jack de Belin, Australian rugby footballer
- Jean-Baptiste Belin, French painter
- René Belin (1898–1977), French trade unionist and politician
- Rudolf Belin (1942–2025), Yugoslav and Croatian football player and manager
- Valérie Belin, French photographer

== Places ==
- Belín, Rimavská Sobota District, village and municipality in the Banská Bystrica Region, Slovakia
- Belin-Béliet, a commune in the Gironde department, France
- Belin, Covasna, a commune in Covasna County, Romania
- Belin, Myanmar, a town in Mon State, Burma
- Belin, Poland, a village in the administrative district of Gmina Nowe Miasto, Poland
- Belin (river), a river in Tuva, Russia
- Laigné-en-Belin, a commune in the Sarthe department, France
- Moncé-en-Belin, a commune in the Sarthe department, France
- Saint-Biez-en-Belin, a commune in the Sarthe department, France
- Saint-Gervais-en-Belin, a commune in the Sarthe department, France
- Saint-Ouen-en-Belin, a commune in the Sarthe department, France

== Other ==
- Belenus, a Celtic sun-god like Apollo
- Éditions Belin, French book publisher since 1777

== See also ==
- Beilin (disambiguation)
- Bilen (disambiguation)
