= Beilin =

Beilin may refer to:

- Beilin District, Suihua, in Heilongjiang, China
- Beilin District, Xi'an, in Shaanxi province, China, so named after the Bēilín (Stele Forest) museum located there
- Stele Forest (碑林; pinyin: Bēilín), a museum in Beilin District, Xi'an, Shaanxi, China

== Surname ==
- Beilin (Surname)

== People with the surname ==
- Michael Beilin (born 1976), Israeli Olympic Greco-Roman wrestler
- Yossi Beilin (born 1948), left-wing Israeli politician
- Irving Berlin (born 1888, Israel Isidore Beilin), American composer and lyricist
- Isaac Beilin (d. 1897), Imperial Russian teacher and physician

== See also ==
- Beilin Road Subdistrict
- Belin (disambiguation)
