= Julie Bertrand =

Julie (Julienne) Bertrand (December 1, 1844 – April 2, 1923) was the first Canadian superior general of the Sisters of the Holy Cross and the Seven Dolours.

== Life ==
In 1851, Julie attended school at Saint-Laurent near Montreal. It was a local boarding school newly opened by the Sisters Marianites of Holy Cross. In 1859, she became a postulant in the order and was given the name Sister Marie de Saint-Basile. This name honoured Basile Moreau, the congregation's founder. As she took greater responsibilities in the Canadian houses the growth of the Congregation of Holy Cross found itself in an expansion crisis. Léocadie Gascoin, named Marie des Sept-Douleurs, dealt with this matter for a time. However, as founder of the Marianite Sisters of Holy Cross in Le Mans, France, she returned there in 1863. By 1869, the long distance and slow communications with Le Mans, created difficulties between the Canadian community and the French motherhouse.

Bishop Édouard-Charles Fabre of Montreal, now took a direct role in negotiation, petitions to Rome and the like, attempting to protect the interests of the community. In 1883, with some autonomy carved out for the Canadian houses, Marie de Saint-Basile was appointed vicar superior of the renamed Sisters of the Holy Cross and the Seven Dolours (since 1981, the Sisters of Holy Cross). Further actions took place and, in 1890, Mother Marie de Saint-Basile was elected the first superior general. In 1896, she was re-elected.

Under Mother Marie de Saint-Basile, the congregation underwent a large and positive expansion. She moved to less onerous duties in 1902. She is most remembered for her determination and skill during the times of conflict and expansion. She was also a leader in the field of education of young females.
