= Léocadie Gascoin =

Léocadie Gascoin (March 1, 1818 – January 29, 1900) was the co-founder and superior of the Sisters Marianites of Holy Cross. Her name in the congregation was Marie des Sept-Douleurs.

== Life ==
Léocadie-Romaine Gascoin was born on March 1, 1818, in Montenay, France. She was the fourth of six children born to middle-class farmers Michel-Jean and Rosalie-Renée Chardon Gascoin. Her mother died in 1822. Leocadie attended the local parish school and spent most of her early life at home taking care of her family. From 1833 to 1837 she went to a boarding school in Laval. She joined Father Basile Moreau in 1841 to found the Marianite Sisters of Holy Cross at Le Mans.

Missionary Sisters were sent to Indiana in 1843 and to Lower Canada in 1847. She came to Canada 1n 1849.

She entered the novitiate in Le Mans and received her religious formation at the Monastery of the Good Shepherd in Le Mans under the direction Mother Mary of St. Dosithee. Gascoin pronounced first vows in 1844 and the following year Moreau made Mother Marie des Sept-Douleurs superior of the Marianite Sisters at Saint-Laurent on Montreal Island.

In 1857, she was appointed superior general of the entire congregation of Marianite Sisters of Holy Cross, in France, the United States, and Lower Canada. She remained provincial superior at Saint-Laurent. She was recalled to LeMans in 1863. During that period, she more than tripled the number of Sisters in service with Holy Cross. The congregation received papal approval in 1867.

In 1869 the sisters in Indiana obtained a papal brief of separation and became the Sisters of the Holy Cross; in 1882, the Canadian congregation established a separate congregation called the Sisters of Holy Cross and the Seven Dolours. Its first superior was Julie Bertrand, named Marie de Saint-Basile.

Marie des Sept-Douleurs remained superior general of her community's houses in France and Louisiana until her death on 29 Jan. 1900.

== See also ==
- Julie Bertrand (Sister Marie de Saint-Basile)
