= Sisters of Holy Cross =

Roman Catholic congregation for women

The Sisters of Holy Cross, (Soeurs de Sainte-Croix) headquartered in Montreal, Quebec, Canada is an international Catholic congregation of religious sisters which traces its origins to the foundation of the Congregation of Holy Cross in 1837 in Le Mans, France by the Blessed Father Basil Anthony-Marie Moreau, CSC. Two other congregations of sisters also have the same origins: the Marianites of Holy Cross (New Orleans, Louisiana) and the Sisters of the Holy Cross (Notre Dame, Indiana).

== History ==
The congregation of the Sisters of Holy Cross developed from the Marianites of Holy Cross, founded in Le Mans, France in 1841 by Moreau and Léocadie Gascoin. The Congregation of Holy Cross is under the patronage of Our Lady of the Seven Dolors.

=== Canada ===
In 1841, Ignace Bourget, Bishop of Montreal, returned from a trip to France, having persuaded a number of religious congregations to establish a presence in the diocese. Father Saint-Germain, parish priest at Saint-Laurent Church asked Bishop Ignace Bourget to obtain some members of the Marianites of Holy Cross for his parish. On his return from Rome in 1847, Bourget introduced the Fathers of the Congregation of Holy Cross, the Clerics of St. Viator, and the Mariantes to the diocese, Sisters of the Holy Cross.

In 1847 four sisters with some companions from the motherhouse in France opened the Couvent Notre-Dame-des-Anges at St. Laurent, Canada, which formed the nucleus of the subsequently erected province. Holy Cross priests and brothers ran the Collège Saint-Laurent, the sisters taught girls at the nearby Collège Basile-Moreau. In 1970, the Collège Basile-Moreau was purchased by the government of Quebec and became Vanier College.

In 1849 four sisters took charge of the boys' orphan asylum in New Orleans, and from there a house was opened in 1854 in New York with the sanction of Father Moreau. Sisters were sent to this establishment from Canada, and New Orleans. Misunderstandings due to orders issued from France and the American foundation in Notre Dame, Indiana led in 1867 to the withdrawal of the American sisters as a separate congregation, the "Sisters of the Holy Cross". Two years later, due to the difficulty posed by long distance and slow communications with Le Mans, the Canadian community became separate as the "Sisters of Holy Cross and of the Seven Dolors" (since 1981, the Sisters of Holy Cross). The revised constitutions were approved in 1910. The houses of New Orleans and New York remained subject to France.

In 1856, at the request of Reverend John MacLaughlin, Pastor of St. Finnan's Parish, four sisters left Montreal to teach at St. Margaret's School in Alexandria, Ontario. In 1928, bilingual classes were begun. In 1912, four Sisters of Holy Cross went to teach in St. Raphael's West in 1912. In 1920, Bishop Émile Grouard asked the sisters to establish a boarding school in Grouard-McLennan. That same year, Sisters of Holy Cross arrived to teach school in Falher, Alberta.

In 1902, Our Lady of Sorrows Province was established composed of the French-speaking houses in Quebec; St. Joseph Province of the English-speaking houses of Ontario and Quebec; and most of the New England houses as Sacred Heart Province. The provincial house for Sacred Heart Province was later established at St. George Manor in Manchester, New Hampshire.

=== United States ===
By the 1880s, many French-Canadian had emigrated to New England in search of employment. pastors of parishes in mill towns began to ask Édouard-Charles Fabre, Archbishop of Montreal, for sisters to staff their parish schools. He recommended the Sisters of Holy Cross. The schools would be bilingual and a mix of both boys and girls. Although mixed classes were not customary, the sisters accepted. The first sisters to be assigned outside Canada arrived at St. Joseph Parish in North Grosvenordale, Connecticut in 1881. In 1883, they came to the parish of St. Louis de Gonzague in Nashua, New Hampshire. Around 1886, sisters from St. Laurent went to Sacred Heart Parish in New Bedford, Massachusetts. Among the tasks undertaken in addition to their teaching responsibilities, the sisters prepared children to receive the sacraments, trained altar servers, and served as sacristans. Between 1881 and 1902 sixteen foundations in five dioceses were established in the United States.

In 1945 the sisters established the Teacher Training Institute in Manchester; it developed into Notre Dame College which was in operation from 1950 to 2002.

== Present day ==
The Generalate is located in Saint-Laurent, Quebec. As of 2015, there were about 450 Sisters of Holy Cross serving in: Canada (1847), United States Region: (Maine, New Hampshire, Vermont, Massachusetts, Connecticut, and Florida); Haiti, Peru, Chile, Rome, Mali, Burkina Faso and Vietnam. In Canada, there are two sections: the English Canadian Region is based in Ontario, while the French Region is out of Quebec. In 1962, the sisters started to wear lay clothes and also changed their religious names back to their baptismal names.

Since 1984, the Sisters of the Holy Cross have directed their apostolate more toward pastoral and social activities. In Manchester, New Hampshire, Holy Cross Family Learning Center offers English as a Second Language (ESL) for beginners and intermediates for the growing immigrant and refugee population of the Greater Manchester. They also sponsor Holy Cross Health Center and St. George Manor in Manchester. HCHC is a forty-bed skilled nursing facility for women religious.
