= Pirouette cacahuète =

French nursery rhyme

"Pirouette cacahuète", sometimes written as "Pirouette, cacahuète", also known under the title "Il était un petit homme", is a popular French children's song or comptine (a nursery rhyme or a "counting-out song").

== History ==
The author is very probably Gabrielle Grandière, born in 1920, resident of Ruaudin, a commune in the Sarthe department, who, at the time of creation of the comptine, was a teacher in Alençon. The slight doubt arises from the fact that she didn't claim authorship until 2012, 60 years later.

== Structure ==
It was originally organized into five stanzas of the same structure (A — Pirouette cacahuète — A — B — B). A more recent variant adds three stanzas and concludes with an invitation to applaud.
