= Laigné-Saint-Gervais =

- Commune
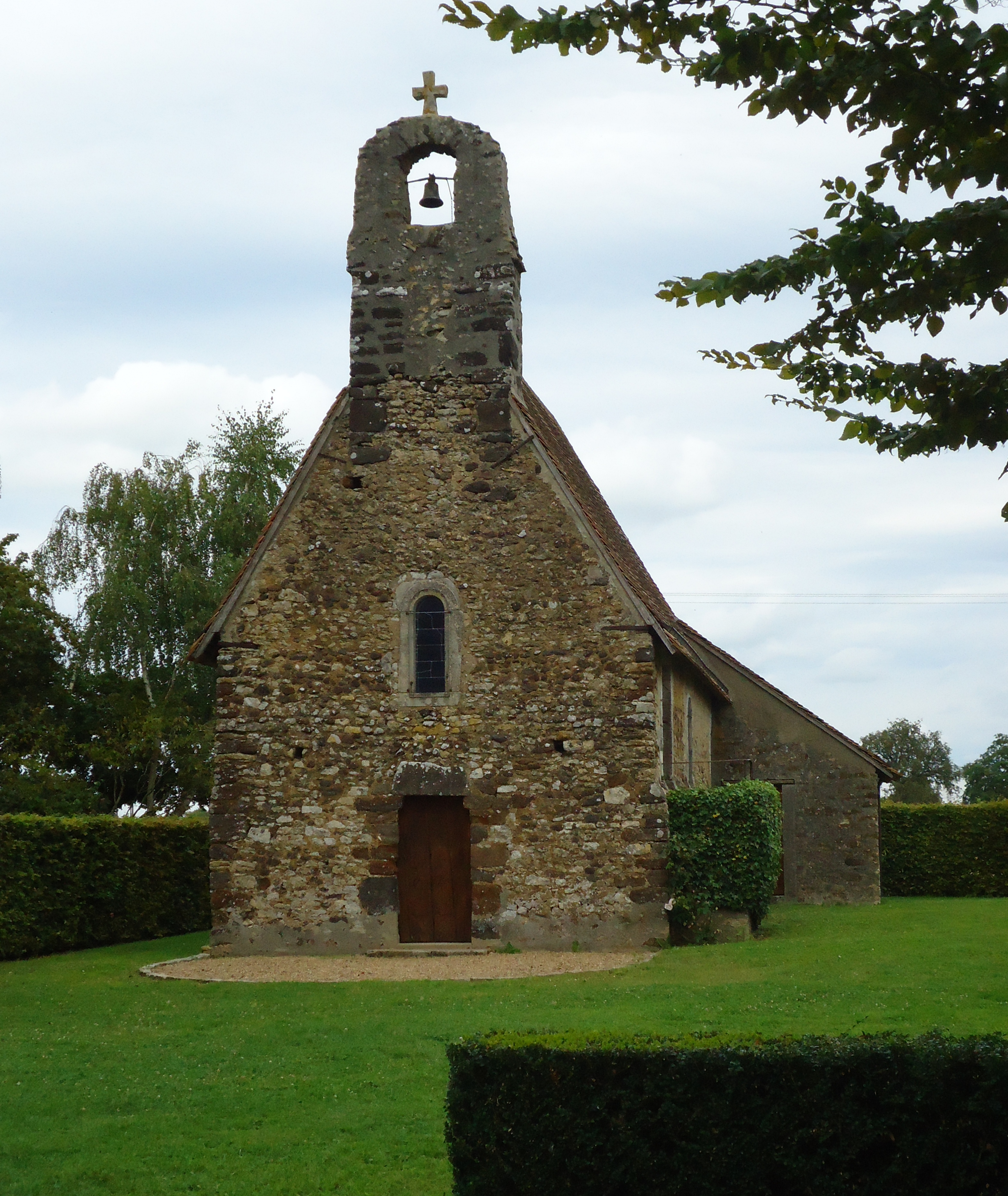
- The chapel of Saint-Anne in Laigné-en-Belin
- Location of Laigné-Saint-Gervais
- Location within France Location within Pays de la Loire
- Coordinates: 47°52′45″N 0°13′51″E
- Country: France
- Region: Pays de la Loire
- Department: Sarthe
- Arrondissement: Le Mans
- Canton: Écommoy
- Intercommunality: Orée de Bercé Bélinois
- Area^{1}: 22.25 km^{2} (8.59 sq mi)
- Highest elevation: 95 m (312 ft)
- Lowest elevation: 40 m (130 ft)
- Population (2023): 4,252
  - Density: 191.1/km^{2} (494.9/sq mi)
- Time zone: UTC+01:00 (CET)
  - Summer (DST): UTC+02:00 (CEST)
- INSEE/Postal code: 72155 /72220
- ^{1} French Land Register data, which excludes lakes, ponds, glaciers > 1 km^{2} (0.386 sq mi or 247 acres) and river estuaries.

Laigné-Saint-Gervais (French pronunciation: [lɛɲe sɛ̃ ʒɛʁvɛ]) is a commune in the Sarthe department in the region of Pays de la Loire in north-western France. It was formed on 1 January 2025, with the merger of Laigné-en-Belin and Saint-Gervais-en-Belin.

== Population ==
Historical population
Year	Pop.	±% p.a.
1968	1,871	—
1975	2,302	+3.01%
1982	3,050	+4.10%
1990	3,409	+1.40%
1999	3,674	+0.84%
2007	4,043	+1.20%
2012	4,530	+2.30%
2017	4,429	−0.45%
2023	4,252	−0.68%
Source: INSEE

== See also ==
- Communes of the Sarthe department
