= Moncé-en-Belin =

- Commune
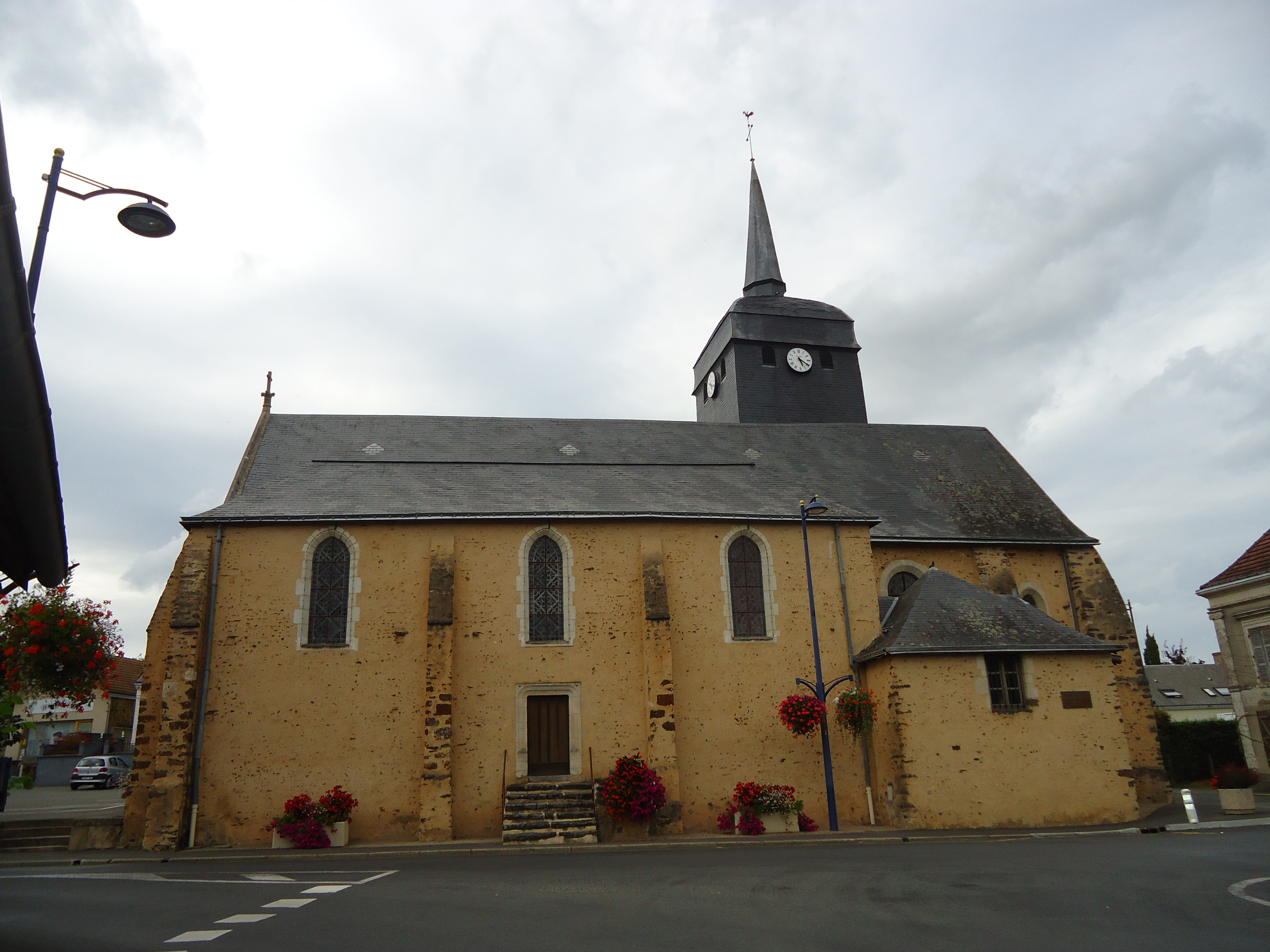
- The church of Saint-Étienne, in Moncé-en-Belin

- Coat of arms
- Location of Moncé-en-Belin
- Location within France Location within Pays de la Loire
- Coordinates: 47°53′43″N 0°11′56″E
- Country: France
- Region: Pays de la Loire
- Department: Sarthe
- Arrondissement: Le Mans
- Canton: Écommoy
- Intercommunality: CC de l'Orée de Bercé Bélinois

Government
  - Mayor (2020–2026): Irène Boyer
- Area^{1}: 17.49 km^{2} (6.75 sq mi)
- Highest elevation: 81 m (266 ft)
- Lowest elevation: 40 m (130 ft)
- Population (2023): 3,697
  - Density: 211.4/km^{2} (547.5/sq mi)
- Demonym(s): Moncéen, Moncéenne
- Time zone: UTC+01:00 (CET)
  - Summer (DST): UTC+02:00 (CEST)
- INSEE/Postal code: 72200 /72230
- ^{1} French Land Register data, which excludes lakes, ponds, glaciers > 1 km^{2} (0.386 sq mi or 247 acres) and river estuaries.

Moncé-en-Belin (French pronunciation: [mɔ̃se ɑ̃ bəlɛ̃]) is a commune in the Sarthe department in the region of Pays de la Loire in north-western France.

The commune is historically in the Haut-Maine part of the province of Maine.

== Toponymy ==
The suffix Belin expresses the belonging of the commune to the territory of Belinois.

During the French Revolution, the town bore the name of Moncé-lès-Le Mans, in reference to the nearby city of Le Mans.

== Geography ==
Moncé-en-Belin is located 12 km south of Le Mans, 10 km north-west of Écommoy, and about 8 km from the 24 Hours of Le Mans circuit. The commune is a part of the community of communes of Orée de Bercé - Belinois, in southern Sarthe.

- Latitude: 47° 53' 41'' N
- Longitude: 0° 11' 53'' E
- Altitude: 40–81 m

== Population ==
Historical population
Year	Pop.	±% p.a.
1968	1,205	—
1975	1,688	+4.93%
1982	2,056	+2.86%
1990	2,257	+1.17%
1999	2,463	+0.98%
2007	3,245	+3.51%
2012	3,440	+1.17%
2017	3,670	+1.30%
2023	3,697	+0.12%
Source: INSEE

== Local culture and heritage ==
The area around the town has several sites of notable historical value, including the following:

- Church of Saint-Étienne from the 11th century, containing a retable set, a mural of the Virgin Mary, a painting, and two statues, which have been given the designation of Monument historique
- Chapel of Notre-Dame-des-Bois from 1828
- War memorial
- Monument to the eight airmen (six Canadians, one English, and one Australian) who died on 23 May 1944, during World War II
- Castle mound of Vaux
- Roman camp
- Château de la Gourdinière
- Château de la Beaussonière
- Hattonnieres Castle
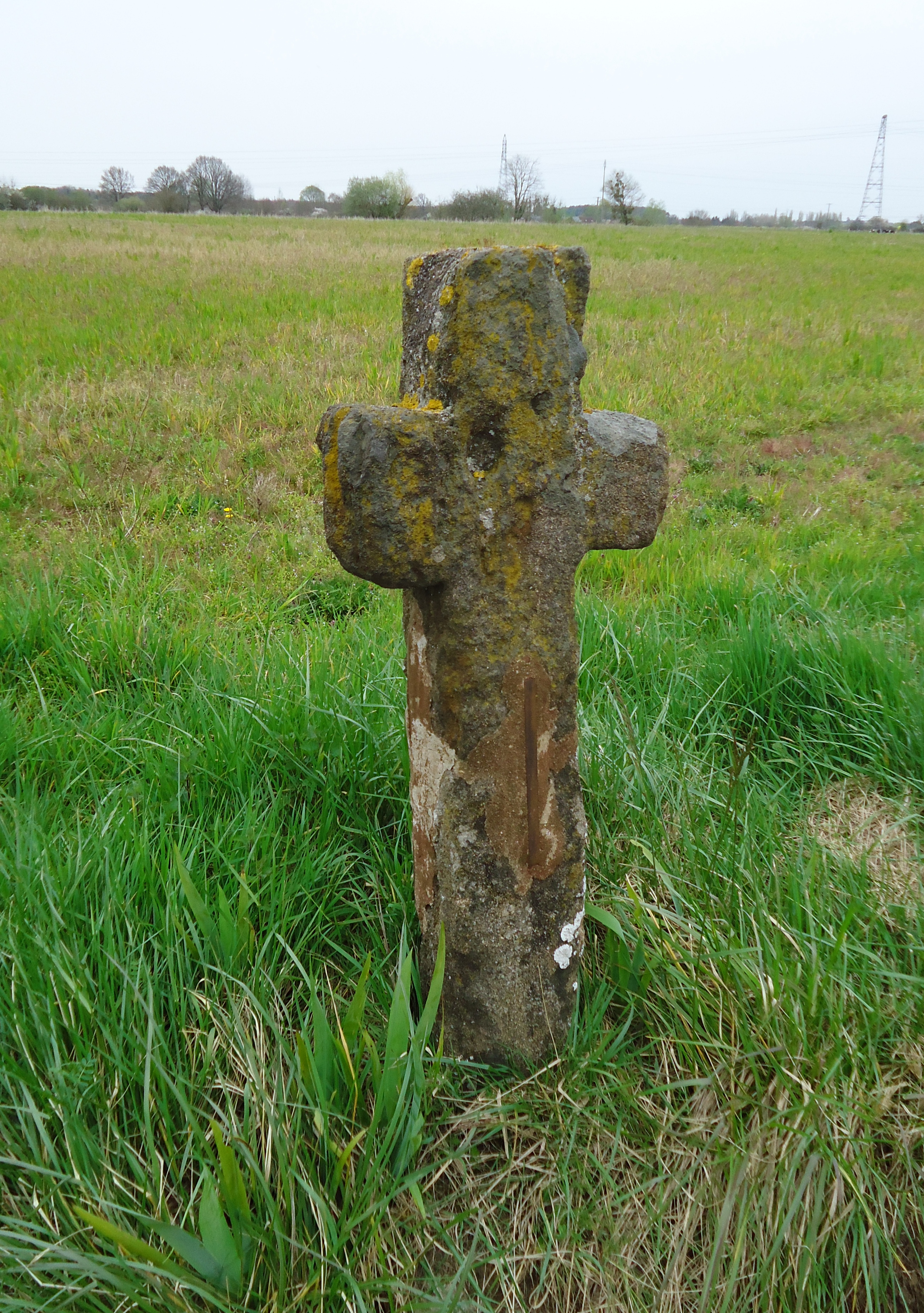
A Latin wayside cross in Roussard sandstone.

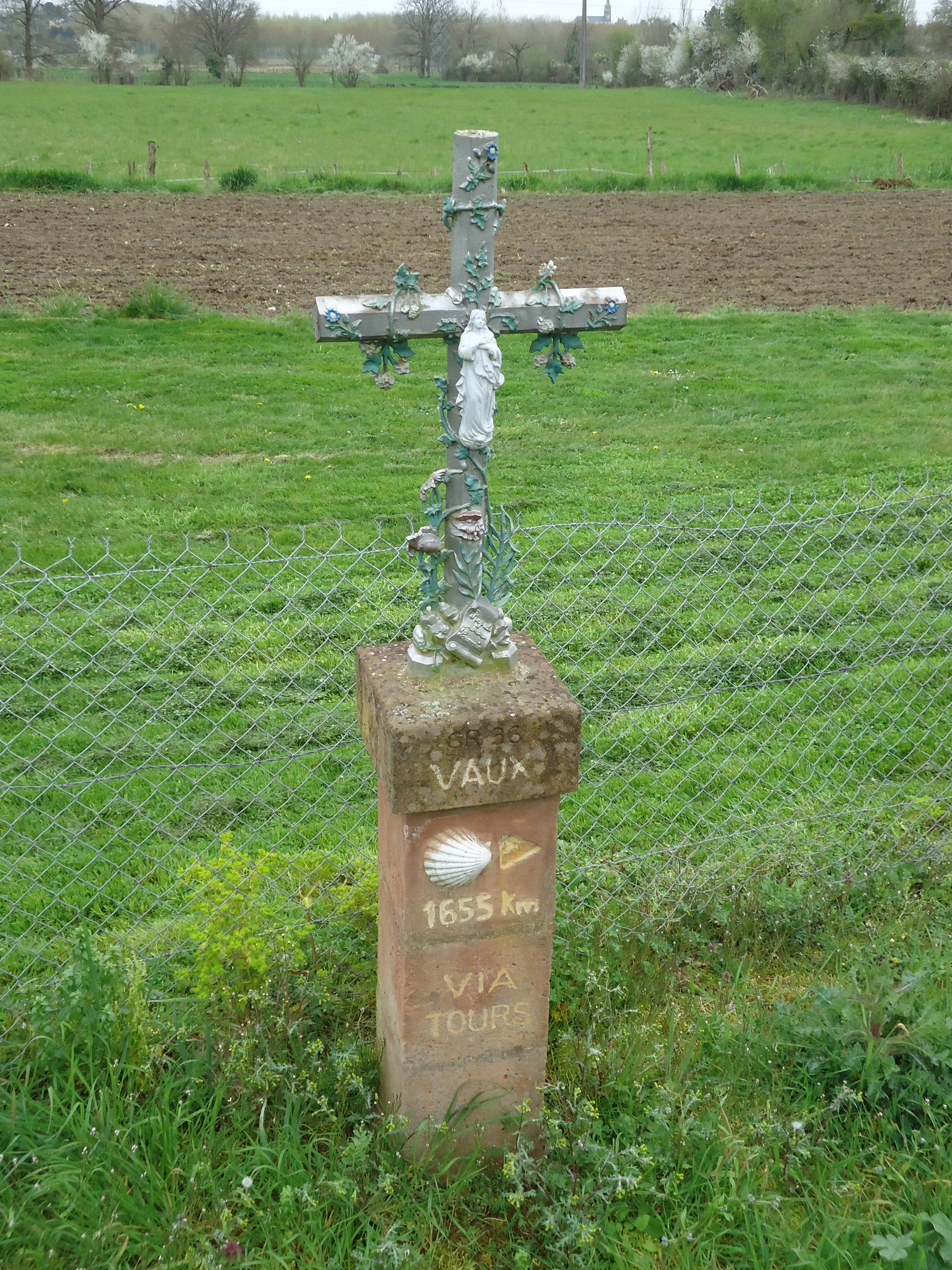
A cross from the Santiago de Compostela pilgrimage.

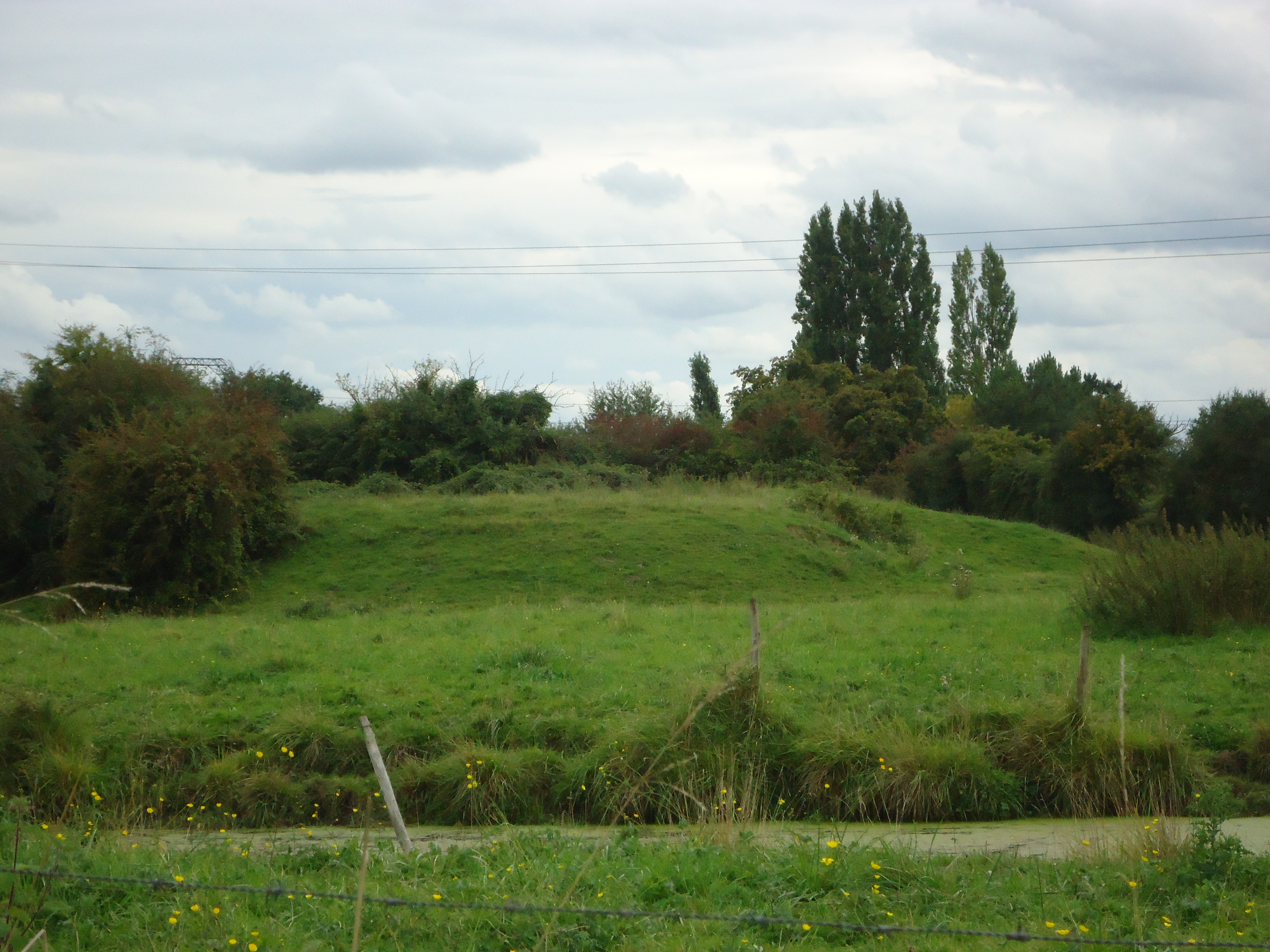
The castle mound in the hamlet of Vaux.

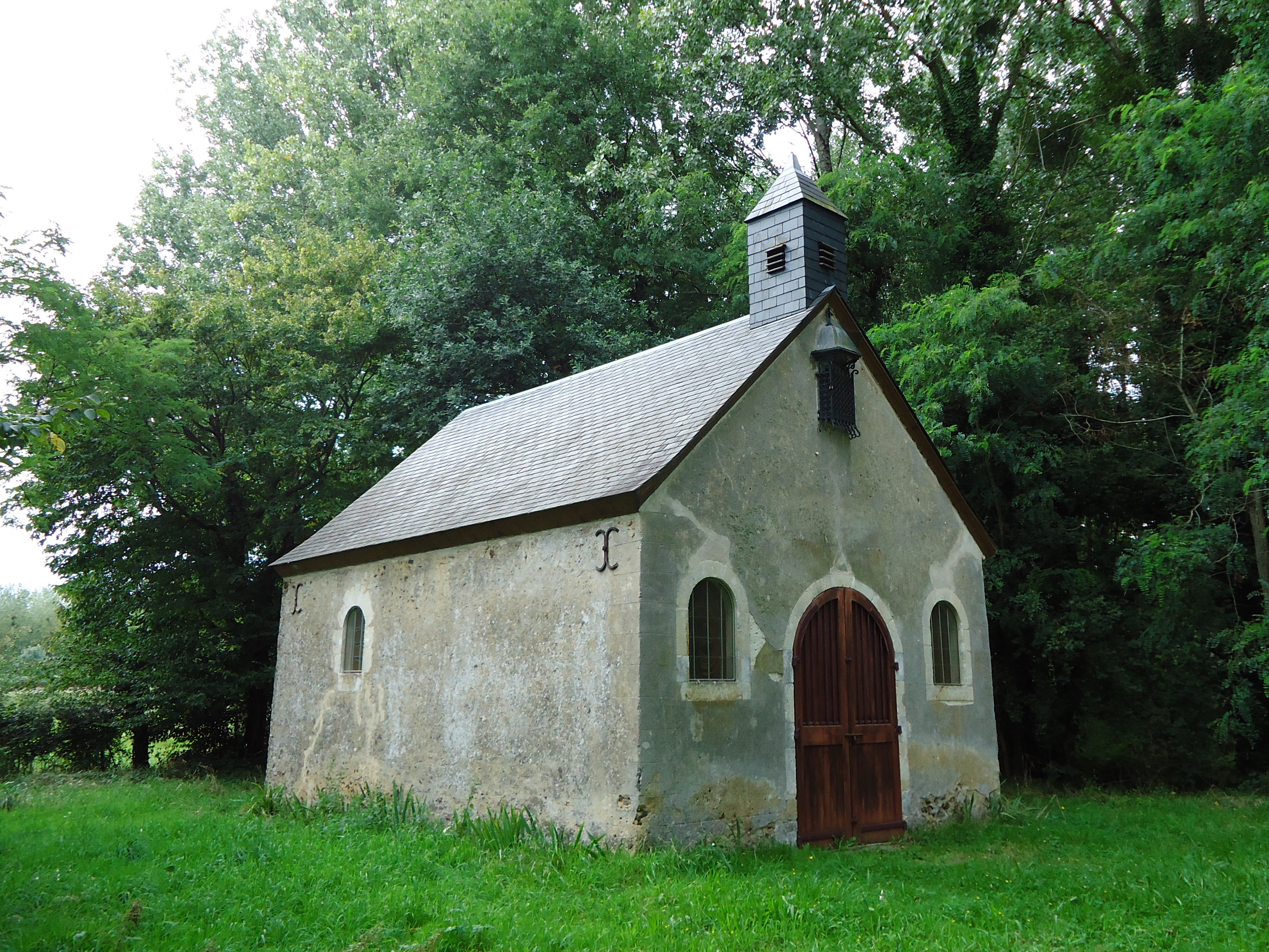
The Notre-Dame-des-Bois chapel.

== See also ==
- Communes of the Sarthe department
