= Beilin (surname) =

The surname Beilin derives from the Ashkenazi Jewish ethnic group. It is related to the large amount of Ashkenazi Jewish surnames derived from the name "Bella".

== People with the surname ==
- Asher Beilin (born 1881), Ukrainian Hebrew and Yiddish journalist
- Irving Berlin (born 1888, Israel Isidore Beilin), American composer and lyricist
- Isaac Beilin (d. 1897), Imperial Russian teacher and physician
- Michael Beilin (born 1976), Israeli Olympic Greco-Roman wrestler
- Yossi Beilin (born 1948), left-wing Israeli politician
