= Saint-Gervais-en-Belin =

- Part of Laigné-Saint-Gervais
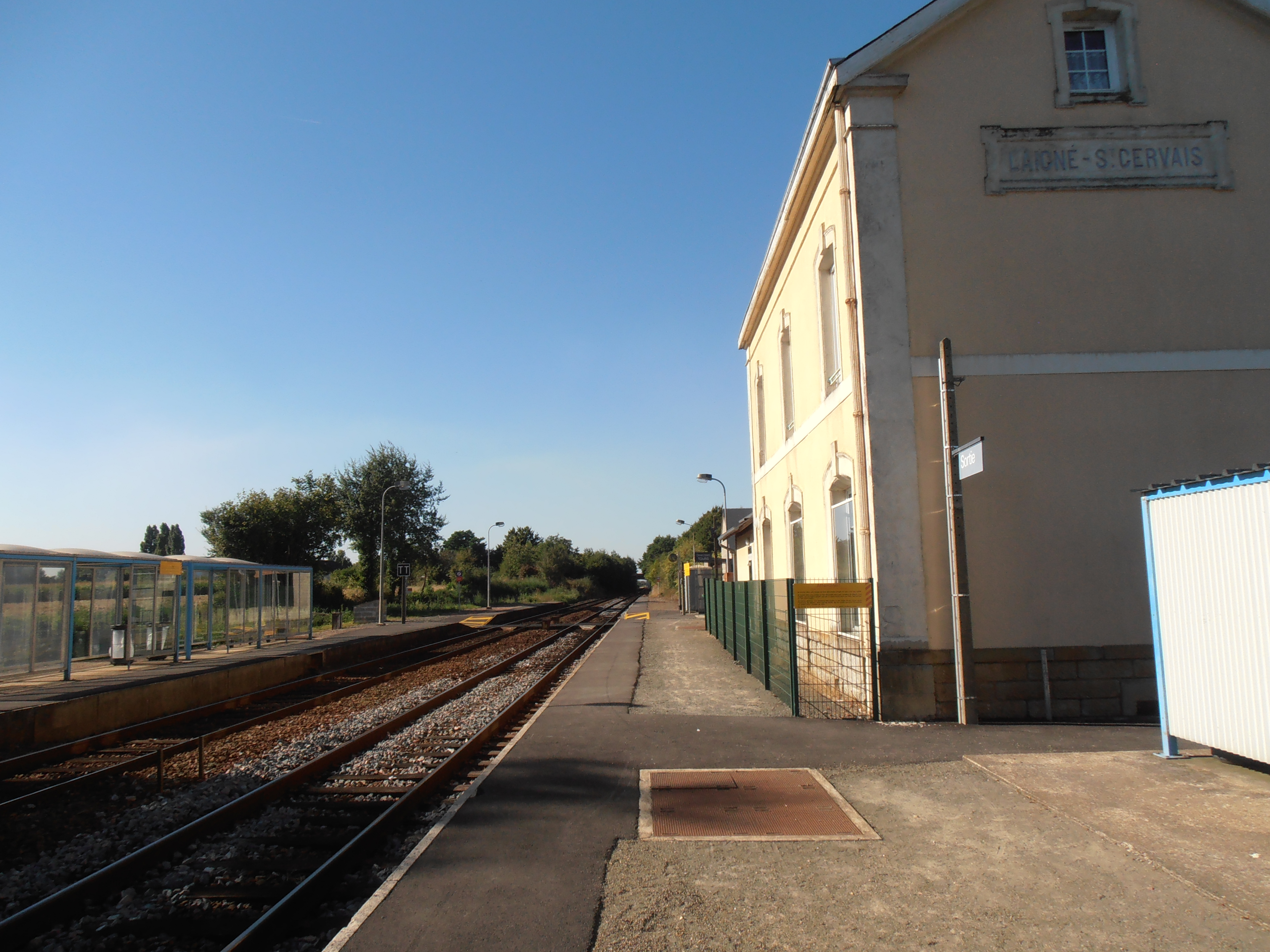
- Laigné - Saint-Gervais railway station
- Location of Saint-Gervais-en-Belin
- Location within France Location within Pays de la Loire
- Coordinates: 47°52′38″N 0°12′59″E
- Country: France
- Region: Pays de la Loire
- Department: Sarthe
- Arrondissement: Le Mans
- Canton: Écommoy
- Commune: Laigné-Saint-Gervais
- Area^{1}: 9.53 km^{2} (3.68 sq mi)
- Highest elevation: 64 m (210 ft)
- Lowest elevation: 40 m (130 ft)
- Population (2022): 1,991
  - Density: 209/km^{2} (541/sq mi)
- Demonym(s): Gervaisien, Gervaisienne
- Time zone: UTC+01:00 (CET)
  - Summer (DST): UTC+02:00 (CEST)
- Postal code: 72220
- ^{1} French Land Register data, which excludes lakes, ponds, glaciers > 1 km^{2} (0.386 sq mi or 247 acres) and river estuaries.

Saint-Gervais-en-Belin (French pronunciation: [sɛ̃ ʒɛʁvɛ ɑ̃ bəlɛ̃]) is a former commune in the Sarthe department in the region of Pays de la Loire in north-western France. On 1 January 2025, it was merged into the new commune of Laigné-Saint-Gervais.

== Population ==
Historical population
Year	Pop.	±% p.a.
1968	746	—
1975	939	+3.34%
1982	1,363	+5.47%
1990	1,655	+2.46%
1999	1,764	+0.71%
2007	1,865	+0.70%
2012	2,114	+2.54%
2017	2,076	−0.36%
Source: INSEE

== See also ==
- Communes of the Sarthe department
