= University of Holy Cross =

Catholic college in New Orleans, Louisiana, US

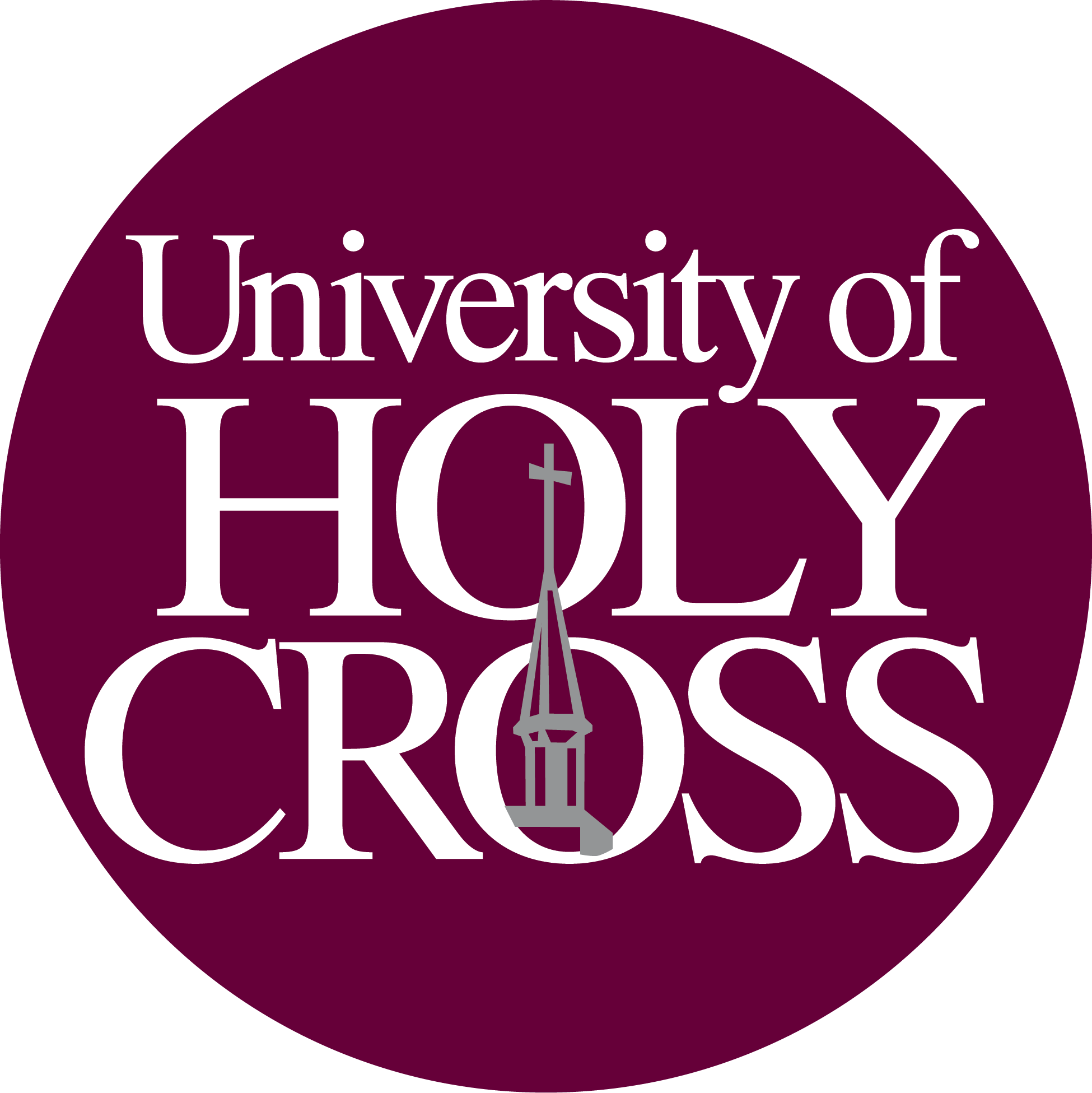
- Former name: Our Lady of Holy Cross College
- Type: Private liberal arts college
- Established: 1916
- Accreditation: SACS
- Affiliations: ACCU
- Religious affiliation: Roman Catholic (Marianites of Holy Cross)
- President: Stanton F. McNeely III
- Faculty: 147
- Students: 1,120
- Undergraduates: 774
- Postgraduates: 346
- Location: New Orleans, Louisiana, United States; 29.9121°N 89.9950°W
- Campus: Large city
- Colors: Maroon and grey
- Website: www.uhcno.edu

University of Holy Cross (UHC) is a private Catholic liberal arts college in New Orleans, Louisiana, United States. It was founded by the Marianites of Holy Cross.

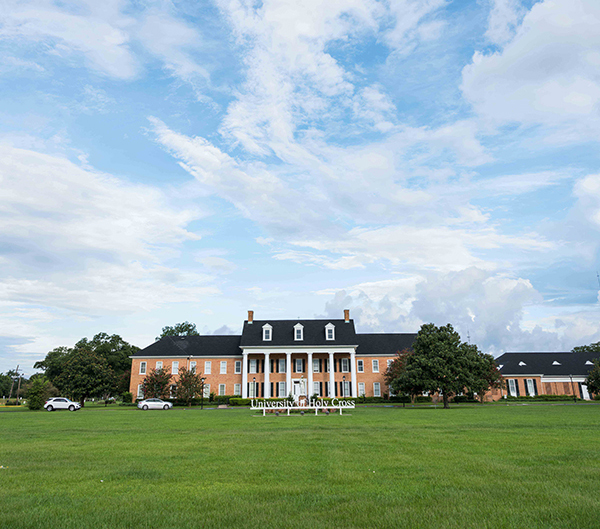
University of Holy Cross - Main Building

== History ==
University of Holy Cross was founded in 1916 as a two-year women's normal school by the Marianites of Holy Cross. Its original location was in the Bywater area of New Orleans. It became a 4-year institution in 1938. In 1947, a 40-acre (16 ha) parcel of land in Algiers was donated to the Marianites. The college completed a move across the river to this new site in 1960. Its area was later reduced by a sale. Men were first admitted in 1967.

In August 2011, the Marianites dismissed the college's president and all 19 of its trustees without warning. The move prompted an investigation by the Southern Association of Colleges and Schools (SACS) Commission on Colleges, the college's regional accreditor. Following the investigation, SACS placed the college on probation for six months.

In January 2016, the institution, formerly Our Lady of Holy Cross College, was renamed University of Holy Cross.

== Campus ==
University of Holy Cross is situated on a 16-acre (65,000 m^{2}) campus in a middle-class residential neighborhood of the Algiers area of New Orleans on the west bank of the Mississippi River. It is built primarily in the Southern Colonial style.

== Academics ==
There are more than 50 undergraduate and graduate programs.

== Notable people ==
- Troy Carter, Congressman serving the 2nd U.S. Congressional District of Louisiana
- Norman Robinson, television news reporter
