= Marigné-Laillé =

- Commune
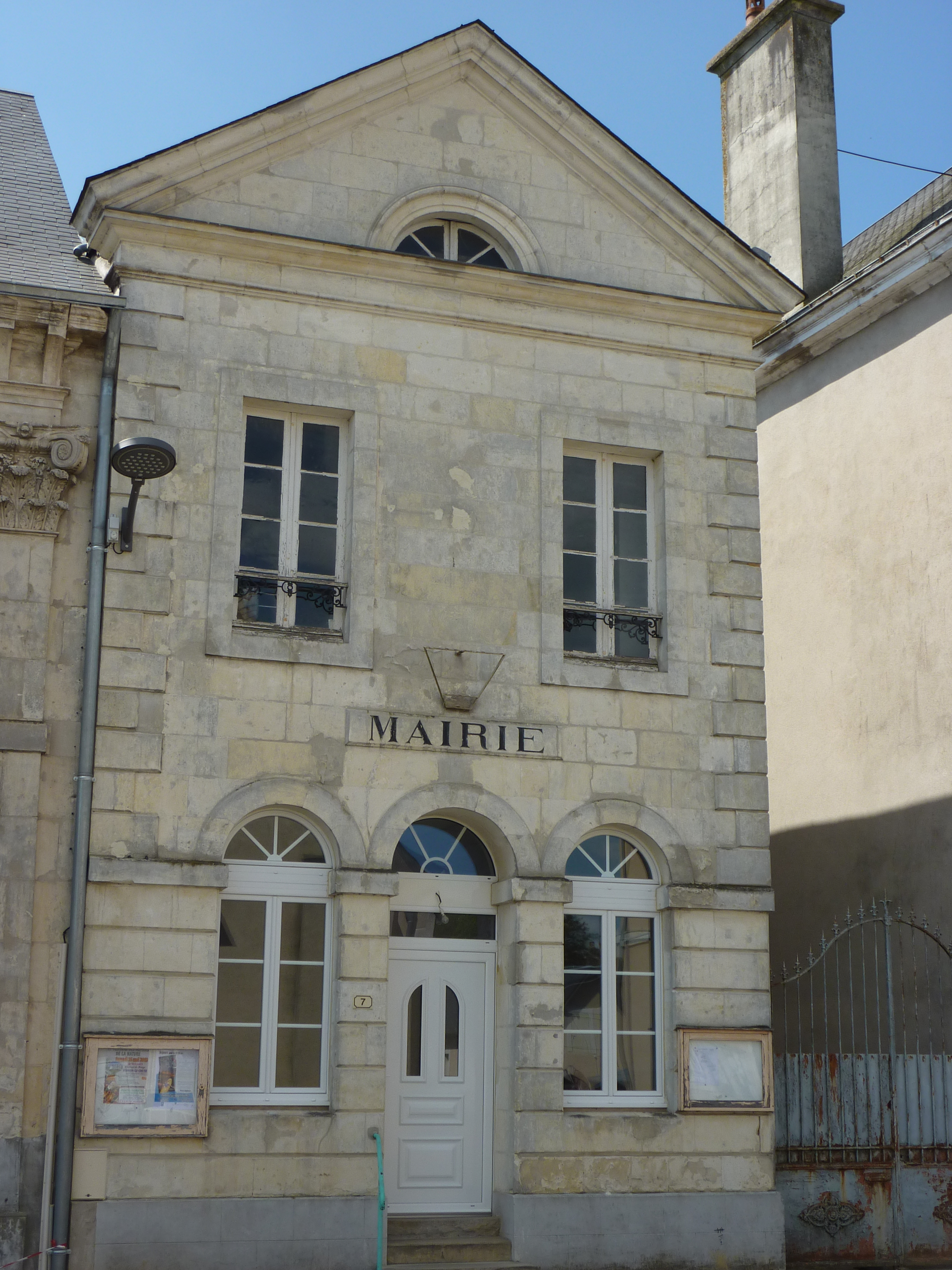
- The town hall of Marigné-Laillé

- Coat of arms
- Location of Marigné-Laillé
- Location within France Location within Pays de la Loire
- Coordinates: 47°49′12″N 0°20′26″E
- Country: France
- Region: Pays de la Loire
- Department: Sarthe
- Arrondissement: Le Mans
- Canton: Écommoy
- Intercommunality: CC de l'Orée de Bercé Bélinois

Government
  - Mayor (2020–2026): Dominique Covemaeker
- Area^{1}: 32.73 km^{2} (12.64 sq mi)
- Highest elevation: 177 m (581 ft)
- Lowest elevation: 90 m (300 ft)
- Population (2023): 1,653
  - Density: 50.50/km^{2} (130.8/sq mi)
- Demonym(s): Marigéen, Marigéenne
- Time zone: UTC+01:00 (CET)
  - Summer (DST): UTC+02:00 (CEST)
- INSEE/Postal code: 72187 /72220
- ^{1} French Land Register data, which excludes lakes, ponds, glaciers > 1 km^{2} (0.386 sq mi or 247 acres) and river estuaries.

Marigné-Laillé (French pronunciation: [maʁiɲe laje]) is a commune in the Sarthe department in the region of Pays de la Loire in north-western France.

== See also ==
- Communes of the Sarthe department
