= Laigné-en-Belin =

- Part of Laigné-Saint-Gervais
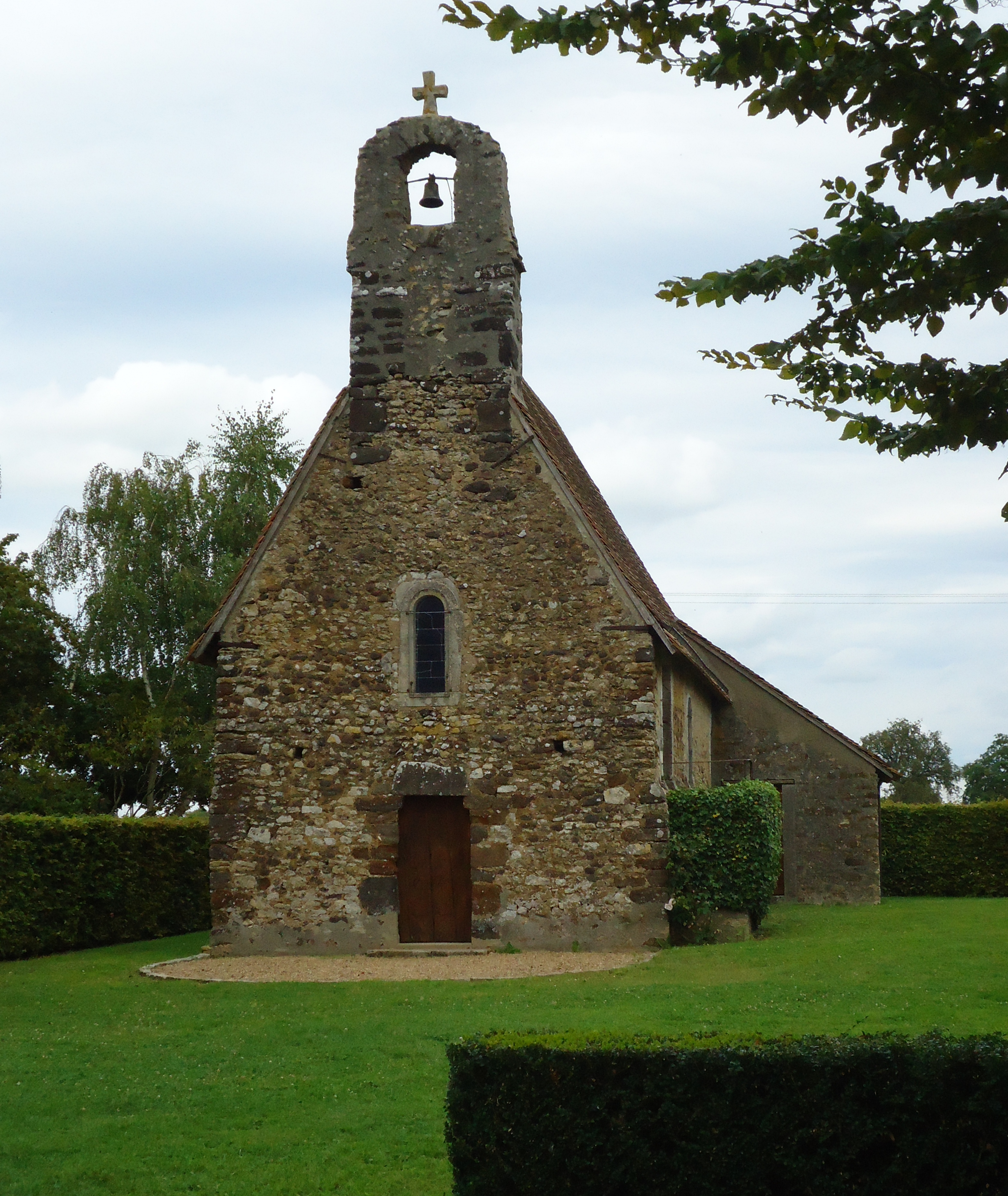
- The chapel of Saint-Anne, in Laigné-en-Belin
- Location of Laigné-en-Belin
- Location within France Location within Pays de la Loire
- Coordinates: 47°52′45″N 0°13′51″E
- Country: France
- Region: Pays de la Loire
- Department: Sarthe
- Arrondissement: Le Mans
- Canton: Écommoy
- Commune: Laigné-Saint-Gervais
- Area^{1}: 12.72 km^{2} (4.91 sq mi)
- Highest elevation: 95 m (312 ft)
- Lowest elevation: 47 m (154 ft)
- Population (2022): 2,269
  - Density: 178.4/km^{2} (462.0/sq mi)
- Demonym(s): Laignéen, Laignéenne
- Time zone: UTC+01:00 (CET)
  - Summer (DST): UTC+02:00 (CEST)
- Postal code: 72220
- ^{1} French Land Register data, which excludes lakes, ponds, glaciers > 1 km^{2} (0.386 sq mi or 247 acres) and river estuaries.

Laigné-en-Belin (French pronunciation: [lɛɲe ɑ̃ bəlɛ̃]) is a former commune in the Sarthe department in the region of Pays de la Loire in north-western France. On 1 January 2025, it was merged into the new commune of Laigné-Saint-Gervais. It was the birthplace of Basil Moreau, founder of the Congregation of Holy Cross.

== Population ==
Historical population
Year	Pop.	±% p.a.
1968	1,125	—
1975	1,363	+2.78%
1982	1,687	+3.09%
1990	1,754	+0.49%
1999	1,910	+0.95%
2007	2,178	+1.65%
2012	2,416	+2.10%
2017	2,353	−0.53%
Source: INSEE

== Points of interest ==
- Arboretum des Quintes

== Notable residents ==
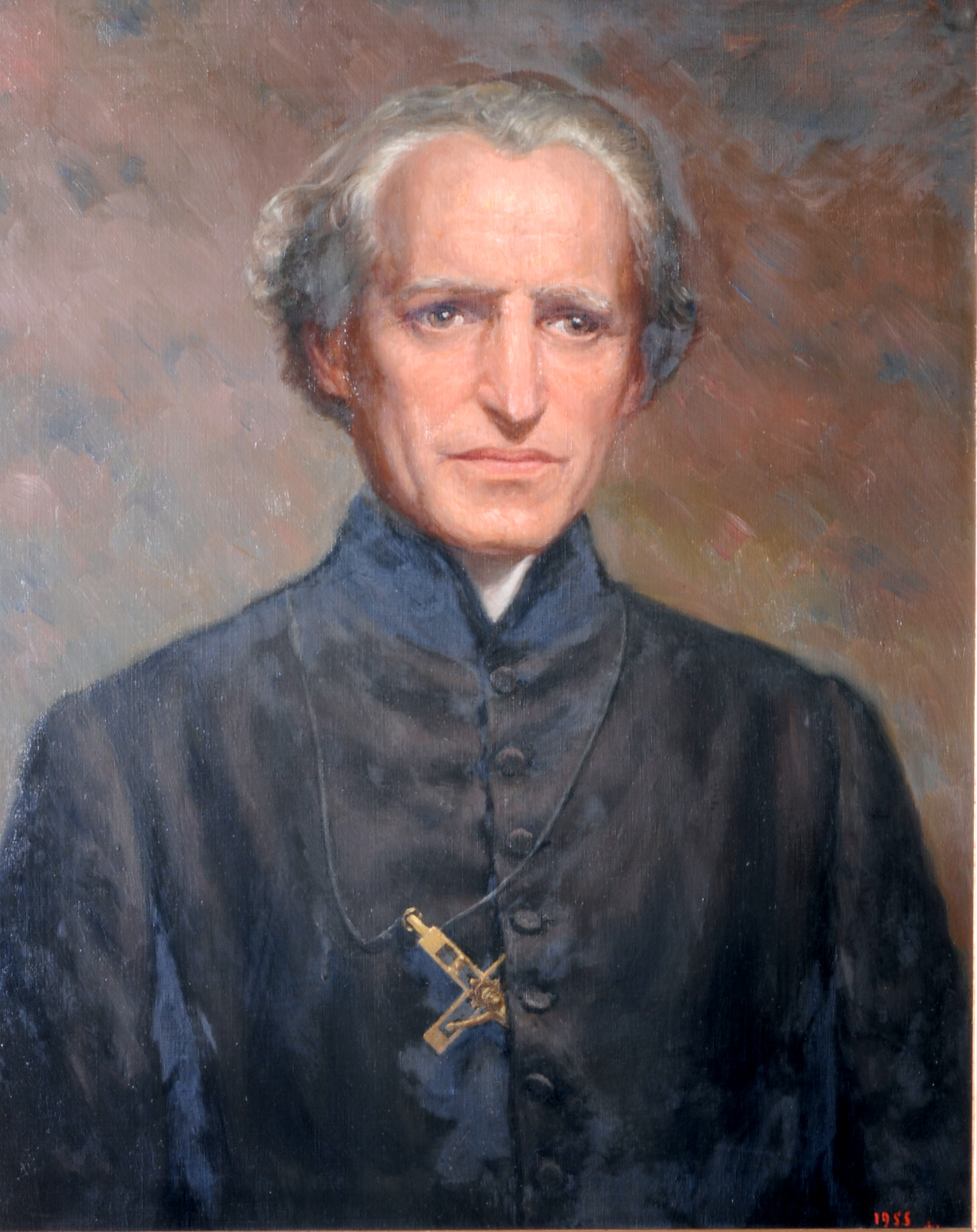
Basil Moreau

- Basil Moreau, (1799–1873), Catholic priest and founder of the Congregation of Holy Cross

== See also ==
- Communes of the Sarthe department
