= Arboretum des Quintes =

Arboretum in Sarthe, Pays de la Loire, France

Coordinates: 47.87°N 0.23°E

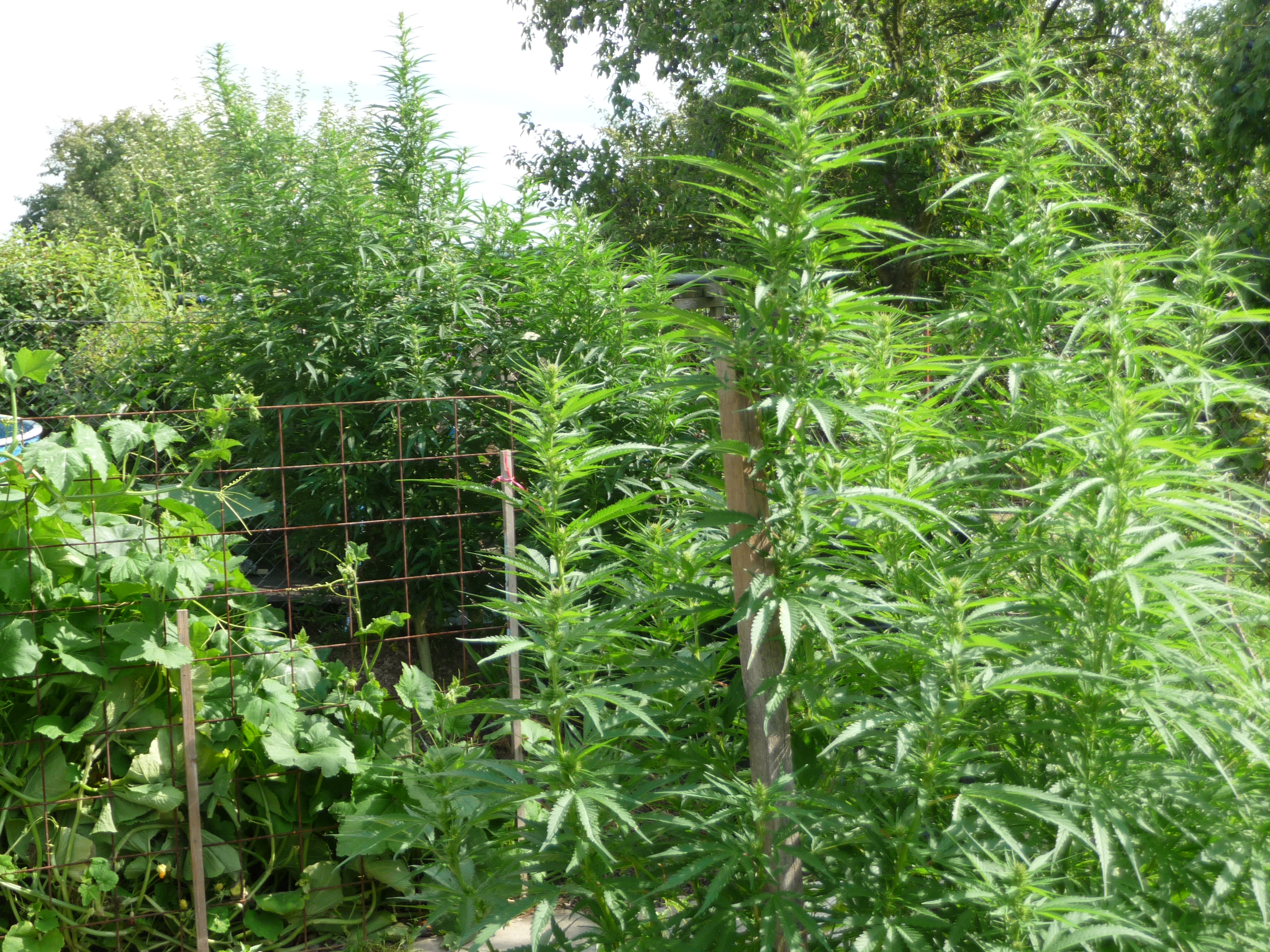
Cannabis sativa plant at Arboretum des Quintes

The Arboretum des Quintes (5 hectares) is an arboretum located in Laigné-en-Belin, Sarthe, Pays de la Loire, France. It contains several hundred trees and shrubs, consisting of oaks, chestnuts, fruit trees, and so forth, as well as one hectare planted with representative landscapes of the Sarthe, including hedges and orchards.

== See also ==
- List of botanical gardens in France
