= Teloché =

Téloché
- Commune
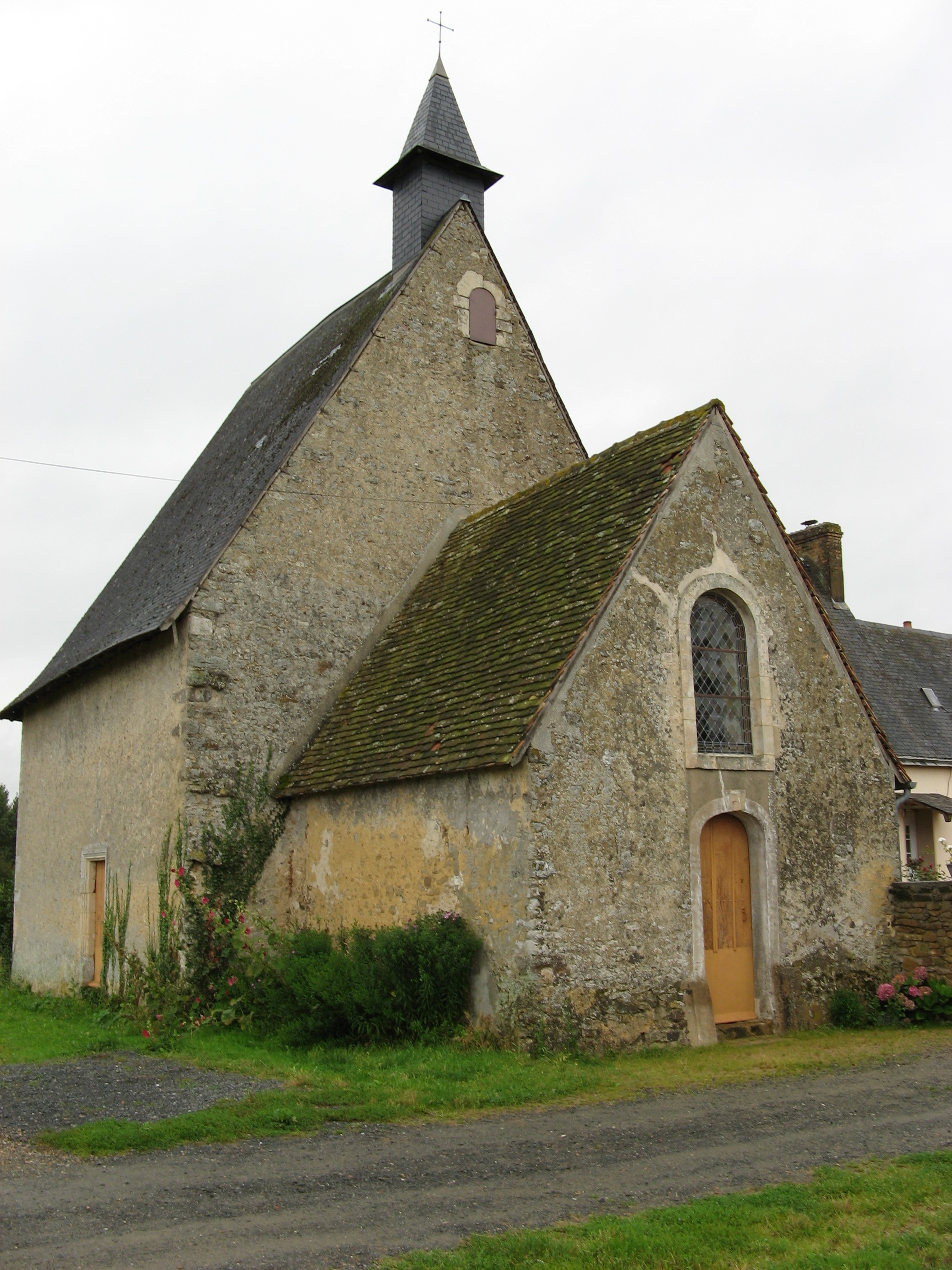
- The chapel of Notre-Dame-de-l’Épine

- Coat of arms
- Location of Téloché
- Location within France Location within Pays de la Loire
- Coordinates: 47°53′17″N 0°16′10″E
- Country: France
- Region: Pays de la Loire
- Department: Sarthe
- Arrondissement: Le Mans
- Canton: Écommoy
- Intercommunality: CC de l'Orée de Bercé Bélinois

Government
  - Mayor (2020–2026): Gérard Lambert
- Area^{1}: 22.79 km^{2} (8.80 sq mi)
- Highest elevation: 101 m (331 ft)
- Lowest elevation: 57 m (187 ft)
- Population (2023): 3,067
  - Density: 134.6/km^{2} (348.6/sq mi)
- Demonym(s): Télochéen, Télochéenne
- Time zone: UTC+01:00 (CET)
  - Summer (DST): UTC+02:00 (CEST)
- INSEE/Postal code: 72350 /72220
- Website: www.mairiedeteloche.fr
- ^{1} French Land Register data, which excludes lakes, ponds, glaciers > 1 km^{2} (0.386 sq mi or 247 acres) and river estuaries.

Teloché is a commune in the Sarthe department in the region of Pays de la Loire in north-western France.

== Population ==
Historical population
Year	Pop.	±% p.a.
1968	1,793	—
1975	2,043	+1.88%
1982	2,355	+2.05%
1990	2,521	+0.86%
1999	2,654	+0.57%
2007	3,040	+1.71%
2012	3,064	+0.16%
2017	3,056	−0.05%
2023	3,067	+0.06%
Source: INSEE

== See also ==
- Communes of the Sarthe department
