= Ruaudin =

- Commune
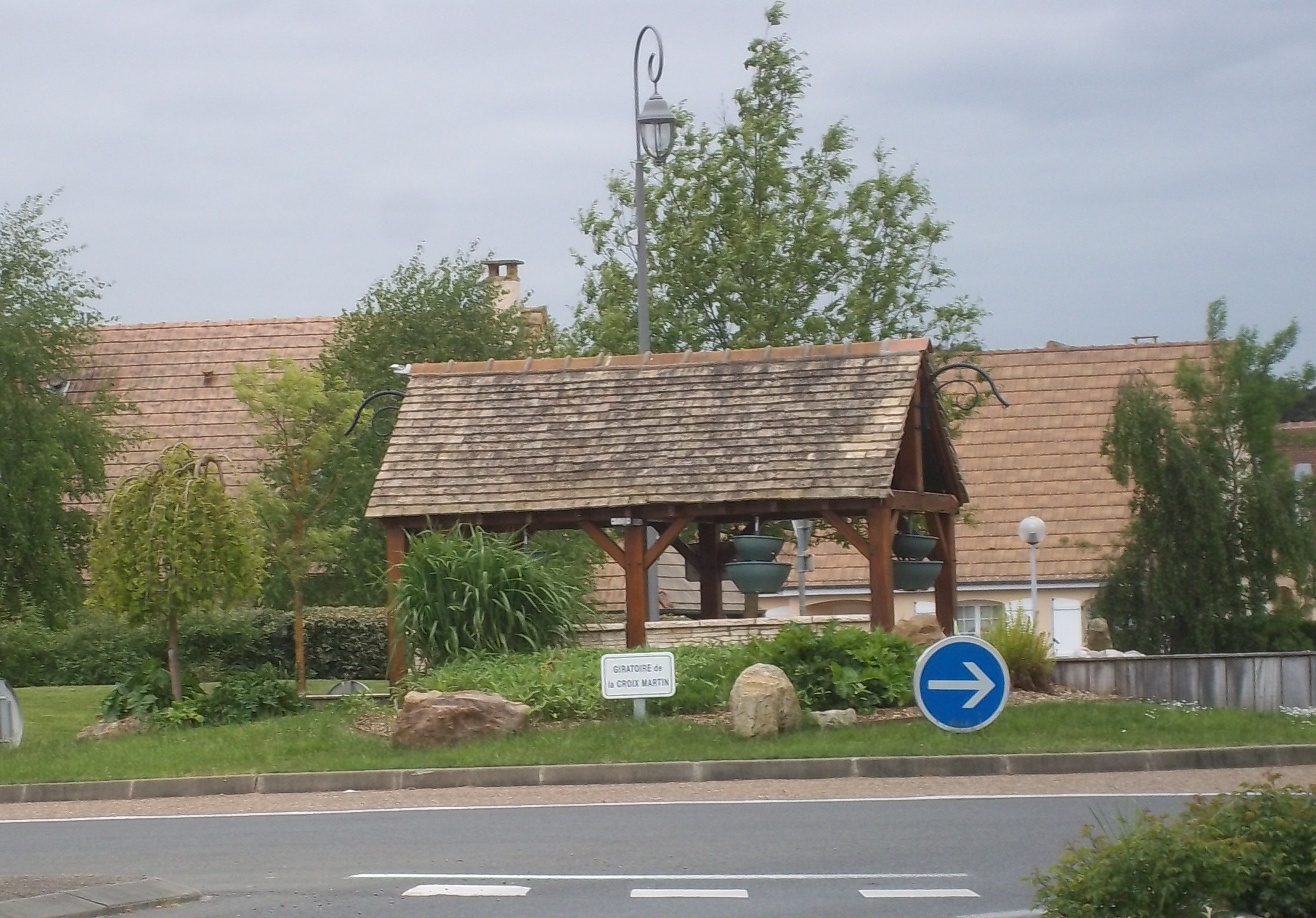
- Roundabout on the road to Le Mans
- Location of Ruaudin
- Location within France Location within Pays de la Loire
- Coordinates: 47°56′44″N 0°16′02″E
- Country: France
- Region: Pays de la Loire
- Department: Sarthe
- Arrondissement: Le Mans
- Canton: Écommoy
- Intercommunality: Le Mans Métropole

Government
  - Mayor (2020–2026): Carole Heulot
- Area^{1}: 13.78 km^{2} (5.32 sq mi)
- Highest elevation: 66 m (217 ft)
- Lowest elevation: 47 m (154 ft)
- Population (2023): 3,481
  - Density: 252.6/km^{2} (654.3/sq mi)
- Demonym(s): Ruaudinois, Ruaudinoise
- Time zone: UTC+01:00 (CET)
  - Summer (DST): UTC+02:00 (CEST)
- INSEE/Postal code: 72260 /72230
- ^{1} French Land Register data, which excludes lakes, ponds, glaciers > 1 km^{2} (0.386 sq mi or 247 acres) and river estuaries.

Ruaudin (French pronunciation: [ʁɥodɛ̃]) is a commune in the department of Sarthe in the Pays de la Loire Region of north-western France. Ruaudin is located in the canton of Écommoy and the arrondissement of Le Mans. The INSEE code is 72260 and the postal code is 72230. The minimum elevation is 47 meters and the maximum elevation is 66 meters. The town has a total surface area of 13.78 km^{2} (5.32 sq mi). The nearest town from Ruaudin is Mulsanne, which is just 4.8 kilometers away. The village had 144 active establishments at the end of 2018. There were 22 documented births in 2019.

== Population ==
Historical population
Year	Pop.	±% p.a.
1968	1,290	—
1975	1,553	+2.69%
1982	2,047	+4.02%
1990	2,579	+2.93%
1999	2,862	+1.16%
2007	3,322	+1.88%
2012	3,421	+0.59%
2017	3,418	−0.02%
2023	3,481	+0.30%
Source: INSEE

== Twin towns ==
Ruaudin has been twinned with the comune of Uggiate-Trevano in Italy since 2013.

== See also ==
- Communes of the Sarthe department
