= Écommoy =

- Commune
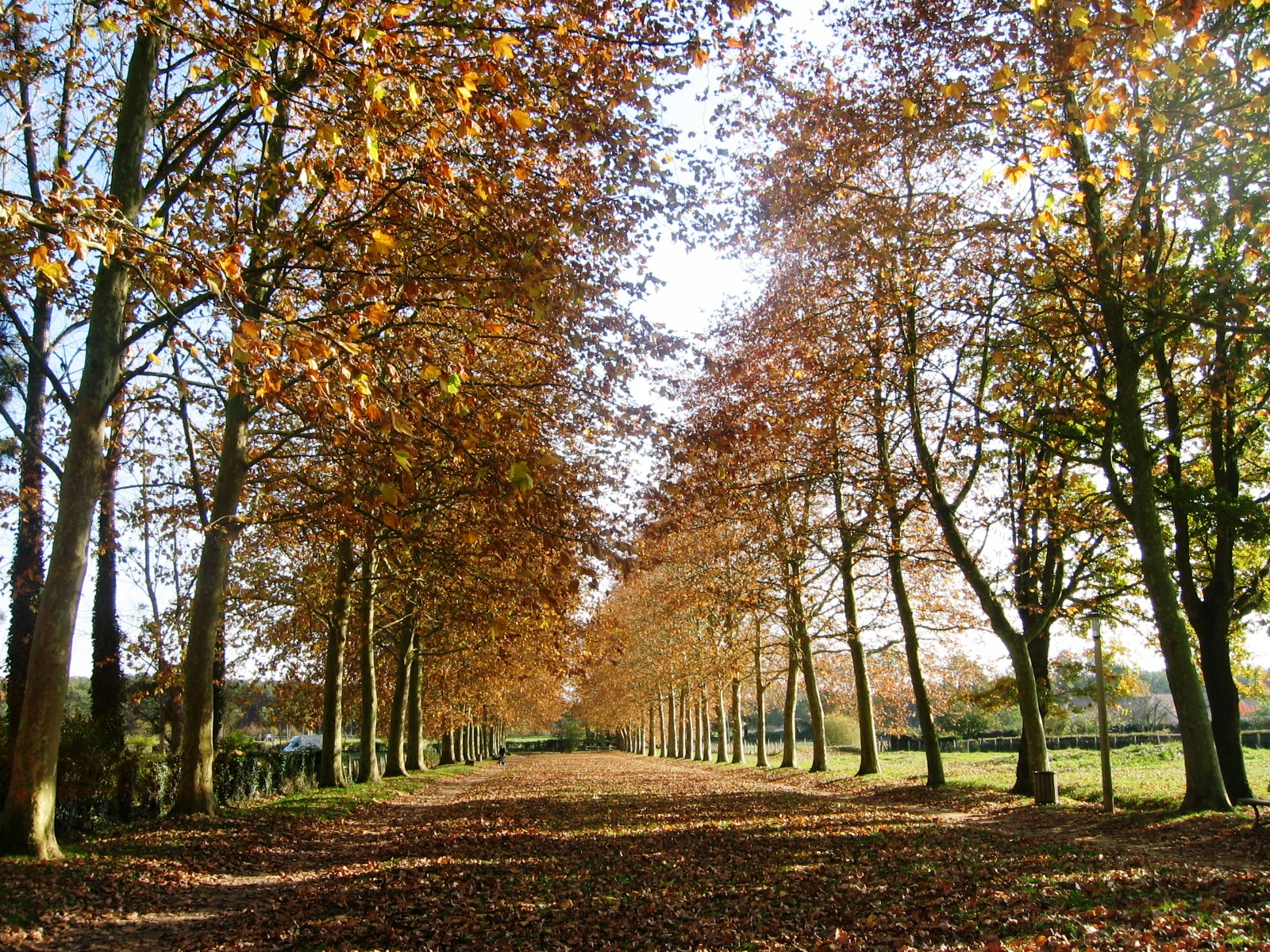
- Entrance to Fontenailles

- Coat of arms
- Location of Écommoy
- Location within France Location within Pays de la Loire
- Coordinates: 47°47′46″N 0°16′27″E
- Country: France
- Region: Pays de la Loire
- Department: Sarthe
- Arrondissement: Le Mans
- Canton: Écommoy
- Intercommunality: Orée de Bercé Bélinois

Government
  - Mayor (2020–2026): Sébastien Gouhier
- Area^{1}: 28.50 km^{2} (11.00 sq mi)
- Highest elevation: 168 m (551 ft)
- Lowest elevation: 62 m (203 ft)
- Population (2023): 4,868
  - Density: 170.8/km^{2} (442.4/sq mi)
- Demonym(s): Ecomméen, Ecomméenne
- Time zone: UTC+01:00 (CET)
  - Summer (DST): UTC+02:00 (CEST)
- INSEE/Postal code: 72124 /72220
- ^{1} French Land Register data, which excludes lakes, ponds, glaciers > 1 km^{2} (0.386 sq mi or 247 acres) and river estuaries.

Écommoy (French pronunciation: [ekɔmwa]) is a commune in the Sarthe department in the Pays de la Loire region in north-western France.

The municipality covers 28.5 km^{2} (11.0 sq mi).

== Geography ==
Écommoy is a town in the south of Sarthe, located 21 km south of the city center of Le Mans, on the Le Mans - Tours axis (the center of the latter city being 58 km away). It is located in the Bélinois, between the Le Mans conurbation (to the north), the Loir valley (to the south), the Sarthe valley (to the west) and the Bercé forest (to the east).

It is served by the A28 motorway and by a station on the Tours - Le Mans line.

== Population ==
Historical population
Year	Pop.	±% p.a.
1968	3,810	—
1975	4,069	+0.94%
1982	4,148	+0.28%
1990	4,235	+0.26%
1999	4,316	+0.21%
2007	4,621	+0.86%
2012	4,669	+0.21%
2017	4,677	+0.03%
2023	4,868	+0.67%
Source: INSEE

== See also ==
- Communes of the Sarthe department
