= Saint-Ouen-en-Belin =

- Commune
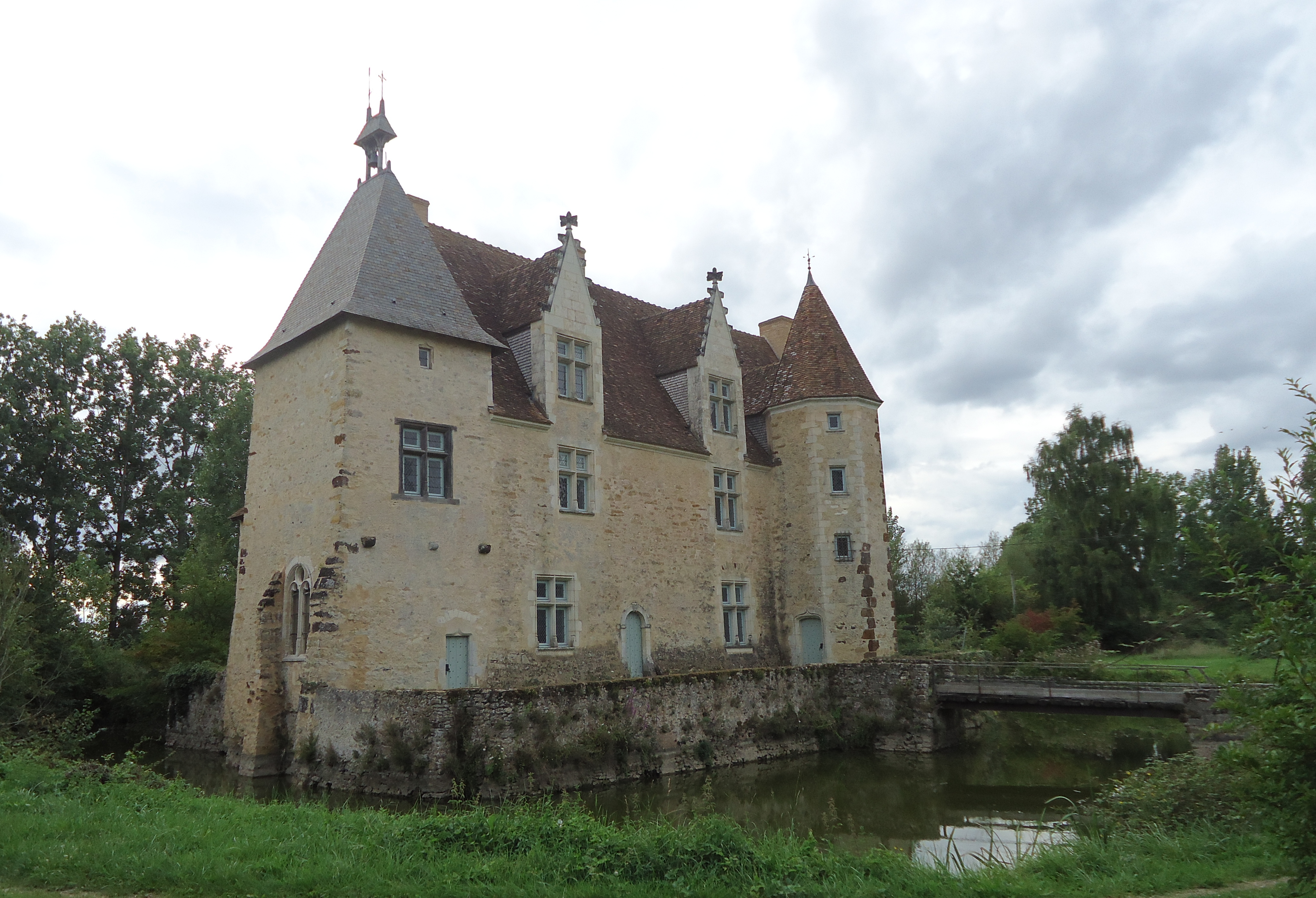
- La Poissonnière Manor, in Saint-Ouen-en-Belin

- Coat of arms
- Location of Saint-Ouen-en-Belin
- Location within France Location within Pays de la Loire
- Coordinates: 47°50′01″N 0°12′41″E
- Country: France
- Region: Pays de la Loire
- Department: Sarthe
- Arrondissement: Le Mans
- Canton: Écommoy
- Intercommunality: CC de l'Orée de Bercé Bélinois

Government
  - Mayor (2020–2026): Florence Février
- Area^{1}: 15.14 km^{2} (5.85 sq mi)
- Highest elevation: 112 m (367 ft)
- Lowest elevation: 46 m (151 ft)
- Population (2023): 1,313
  - Density: 86.72/km^{2} (224.6/sq mi)
- Demonym(s): Oudonien, Oudonienne
- Time zone: UTC+01:00 (CET)
  - Summer (DST): UTC+02:00 (CEST)
- INSEE/Postal code: 72306 /72220
- ^{1} French Land Register data, which excludes lakes, ponds, glaciers > 1 km^{2} (0.386 sq mi or 247 acres) and river estuaries.

Saint-Ouen-en-Belin (French pronunciation: [sɛ̃t‿wɛ̃ ɑ̃ bəlɛ̃]) is a commune in the Sarthe department in the region of Pays de la Loire in north-western France.

== See also ==
- Communes of the Sarthe department
