= Basil Moreau =

French priest

Blessed Basil Moreau C.S.C.
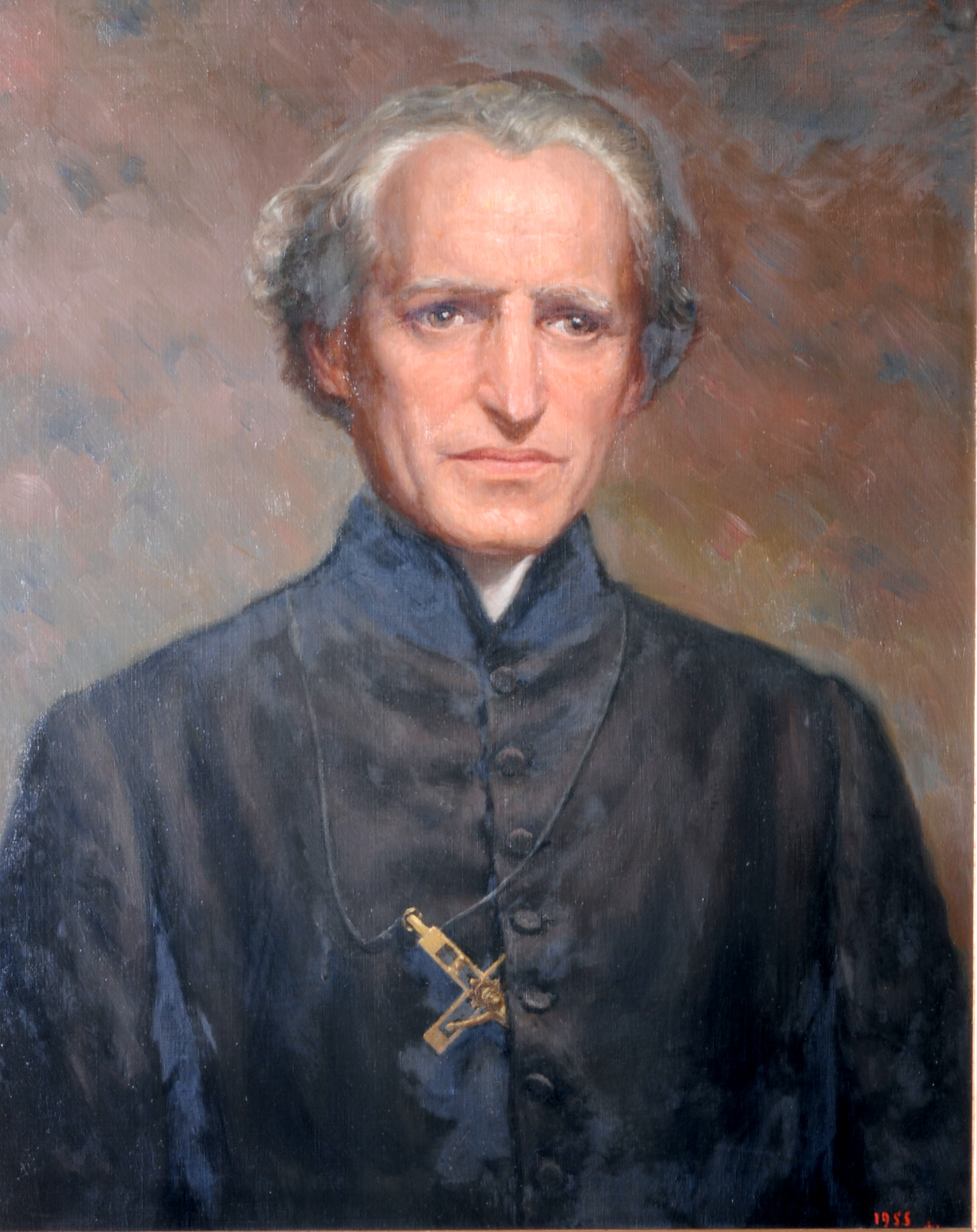
- Blessed Basil Moreau

Priest, Religious, Founder and Confessor
- Born: February 11, 1799; Laigné-en-Belin, France
- Died: January 20, 1873 (aged 73); Le Mans, France
- Venerated in: Roman Catholicism
- Beatified: September 15, 2007, Le Mans, France by Pope Benedict XVI

1st Superior General of the Congregation of Holy Cross
- In office 1837–1866
- Succeeded by: Pierre Dufal

Basile-Antoine Marie Moreau, C.S.C. (February 11, 1799 – January 20, 1873) was the French priest who founded the Congregation of Holy Cross from which two additional congregations were founded, namely the Marianites of Holy Cross and the Sisters of the Holy Cross. Moreau was beatified on September 15, 2007 in Le Mans, France.

== Early life ==
Basile-Antoine Marie Moreau was born on February 11, 1799, in Laigné-en-Belin, a small village near Le Mans, the ninth of fourteen children of Louis and Louise Pioger Moreau. His father was a farmer and a wine merchant. He grew up in the midst of the turmoil of the French Revolution. As his parents were devout Catholics involved in the underground Church, the aspect of the Revolution that most affected him was the suppression of the Church.

Moreau was able to receive a good primary education by the generosity of his parish priest Abbé Julian Le Provost who tutored him. In 1814 Provost made arrangements for Moreau to enter the minor seminary at Chateau Gontier (today the Lycée Victor-Hugo ). In 1816 Moreau entered the diocesan seminary in Le Mans (located at St. Vincent's Abbey, today the Lycée Bellevue), when the hostilities of the Revolution toward the Church had subsided. The seminary was run by the Society of Saint-Sulpice and schooled him in the French school of spirituality which remained an inspiration in his preaching and writings all his life. At the age of 22, in 1821, Moreau was ordained a priest of the Diocese of Le Mans at the Old Visitation Convent Chapel of the Sacred Heart, while the Cathedral of St. Julien in Le Mans was under restoration. After ordination Moreau spent two more years with the Sulpicians in Paris, first at the Seminary of St. Sulpice and then at the Suplician Solitude at Issy.

== Ministry ==
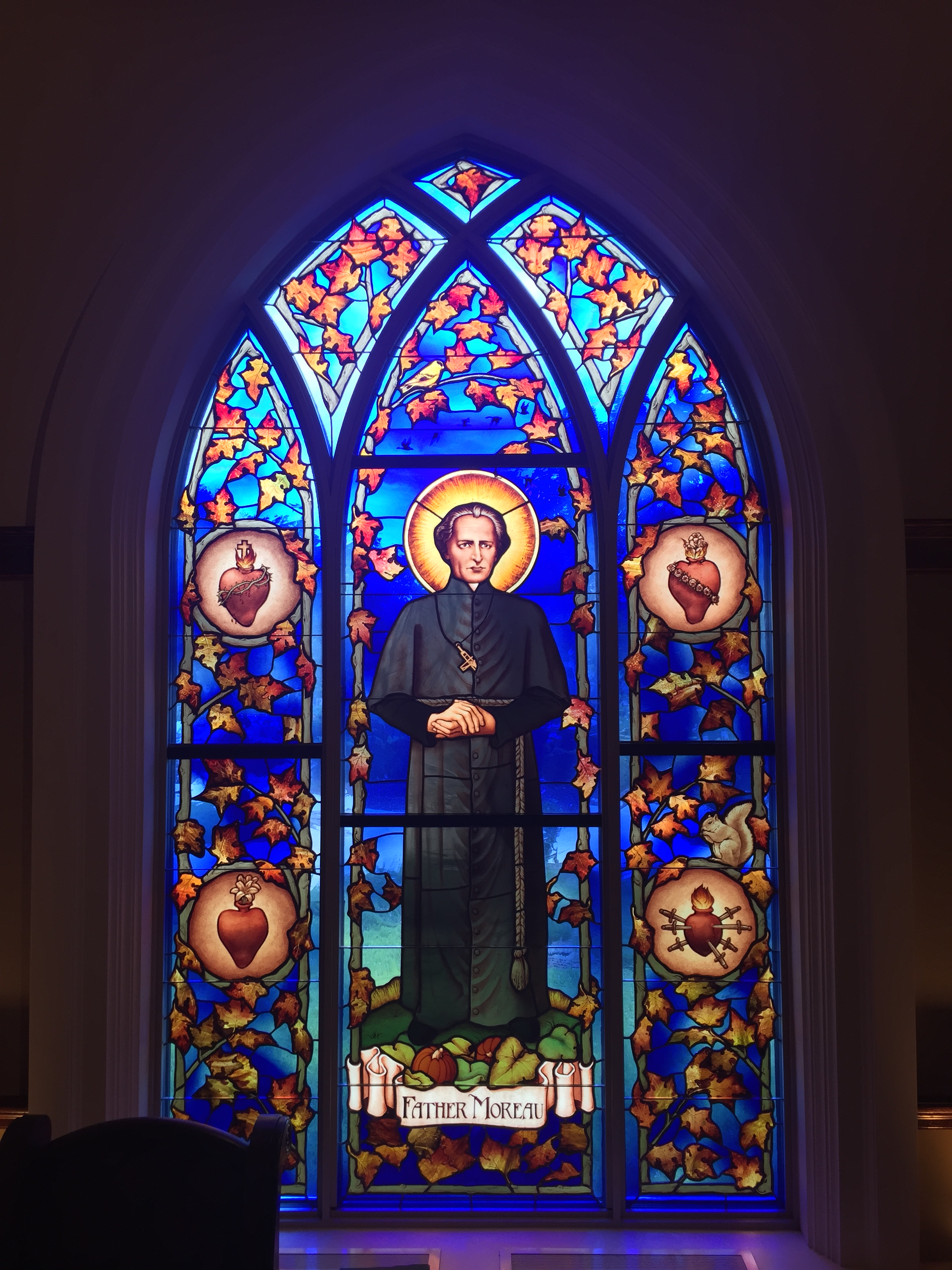
Basile Moreau in a stained glass window in Stinson-Remick hall at the University of Notre Dame

In 1823, Moreau became professor of philosophy at the minor seminary of Tessé (today the Museum of Tessé in Le Mans). Then in 1825 he taught at St Vincent Seminary and later became the vice-rector and spiritual director. As most of the pastors and teachers in France before the Revolution were priests and religious forced into exile, by the 1820s most of the nation was ill-catechized, illiterate, and without benefit of the sacraments. Restoration of the Church was the principal theme and work of Moreau's life. As a young priest and throughout his life, Moreau was an effective preacher who preached parish missions and offered the sacraments on an itinerant basis to rekindle the neglected faith in towns and villages throughout the region.

In 1835, he was assigned to be the assistant superior of the seminary at Le Mans, where he was a popular and inspiring professor of theology. He founded a group of priests within the Diocese of Le Mans to assist diocesan clergy in his various endeavors to re-invigorate the Church, especially preaching parish missions. He called them the Society of Auxiliary Priests. In the same year, an older priest of the same diocese, Jacques-Francois Dujarié, who fifteen years before, in 1820, had founded a band of young men to re-establish and teach in the schools throughout the region, handed responsibility for them over to Moreau on account of his failing health. While not technically religious because they had not made a novitiate or taken public vows, these young men were known as the Brothers of St. Joseph.

== Foundation of Holy Cross ==
Following the developments of 1835, which placed in Moreau's hands all the pieces of a nascent religious community, he began to lay the groundwork for just that. In 1837, under the leadership of Moreau, the Brothers of St. Joseph and the Society of Auxiliary Priests joined by signing together the "Fundamental Pact of Union", becoming two equal societies in one community, the Congregation of Holy Cross.

The congregation took its name from the neighborhood of Sainte-Croix in Le Mans, where the 12th-century church, Notre-Dame de Sainte-Croix, was to become the mother church of the new foundation. Holy Cross, following the example of its founder, would be ultramontane in its outlook, even adopting at the behest of Pope Pius IX the Roman collar and the black cape for the priest (which is identical to the pope's, but in black).

== Foundations of sisters ==
There is evidence that Dujarié's dream was to found a religious community of three societies, priests, brothers, and sisters under one rule and one superior general. Moreau made good on that vision by founding in 1841, with Léocadie Gascoin, a third society within the Congregation, that of the sisters. Today, there are three distinct congregations of women religious: the Marianites of Holy Cross (France), Sisters of the Holy Cross (United States), and Sisters of Holy Cross (Canada).

Taking his inspiration from Dujarié, Moreau named the societies the Salvatorists, the Josephites and the Marianites, after the three persons of the Holy Family. It was Moreau's vision for the three societies to be united in a single religious institute, but Church norms did not allow for men and women to be so joined in a canonically recognised congregation. To this day, though in separate congregations, the priests, brothers and sisters of Holy Cross refer to themselves collectively as the Holy Cross Family.

== Later life ==
In the late 1850s, several influential members at a general chapter had him ousted as superior general over differences in what direction the congregation should take. Forced to live apart from the community, he moved in with his sisters but continued to preach retreats in the country parishes around Le Mans. Moreau died on January 20, 1873.

== Veneration ==
The cause for Moreau's beatification was formally opened on 20 June 1950, and he was given the title of Servant of God in 1957. On April 12, 2003, Pope John Paul II proclaimed him Venerable.

Moreau was beatified in Le Mans by Pope Benedict XVI on September 15, 2007, the feast day of Our Lady of Sorrows. Blessed Basile Moreau is commemorated on January 20.

== Legacy ==
Education is Moreau's lasting legacy. Moreau Seminary, located on the University of Notre Dame campus, is the main seminary for the American province of the Congregation of Holy Cross. In 1841, Moreau sent Edward Sorin and six brothers to the Diocese of Vincennes, Indiana to assist the bishop is setting up a school for boys. A year later, the bishop gave them land at the northern end of the diocese for a new foundation. Thus, Moreau is credited with playing a key role in the foundation of the University of Notre Dame as well as Saint Mary's College in Notre Dame, Indiana. Dozens of other schools, colleges, and universities around the world have been erected under the auspices of the four congregations of Holy Cross who continue to follow in the footsteps of their founder.

In 1966, the Josephites (or Brothers of Holy Cross) founded the third institution of higher education in Notre Dame, Indiana to base its educational philosophy on the teachings of Moreau. Holy Cross College began as a community college with the mission of helping students with the intent to transfer into one of the other two institutions. However, in 2003 Holy Cross College became a residential baccalaureate liberal arts college with its own reputation for superior teaching. Basil Hall, a men's residential hall at Holy Cross College, is named in honor of Moreau. Holy Cross College's mascot is a St. Bernard (dog) named Basil, in honor of Basile Moreau.

St. Edward's University in Austin, Texas is a Holy Cross school and has a co-ed residential hall called Basil Moreau Hall.

The University of Portland in Portland, Oregon is run by the Congregation of Holy Cross. It features the Moreau Center for Service and Leadership, which connects students to service opportunities throughout Portland and beyond.

Moreau Catholic High School is located in Hayward, California, about 25 miles (40 km) southeast of San Francisco. It is among nine Catholic high schools in the Diocese of Oakland, and it is sponsored by the South-West Province of the Congregation of Holy Cross. Moreau Catholic is affiliated with many other Holy Cross educational institutions worldwide, but they are the only one named after the founder of Holy Cross, Moreau.

The Holy Cross High School, New Orleans in New Orleans, Louisiana was founded by Moreau. It was once called Holy Cross College, but is now known as Holy Cross School. It is located on Paris Avenue.

== See also ==
- Julie Bertrand (Sister Marie de Saint-Basile)
