= Saint-Biez-en-Belin =

- Commune
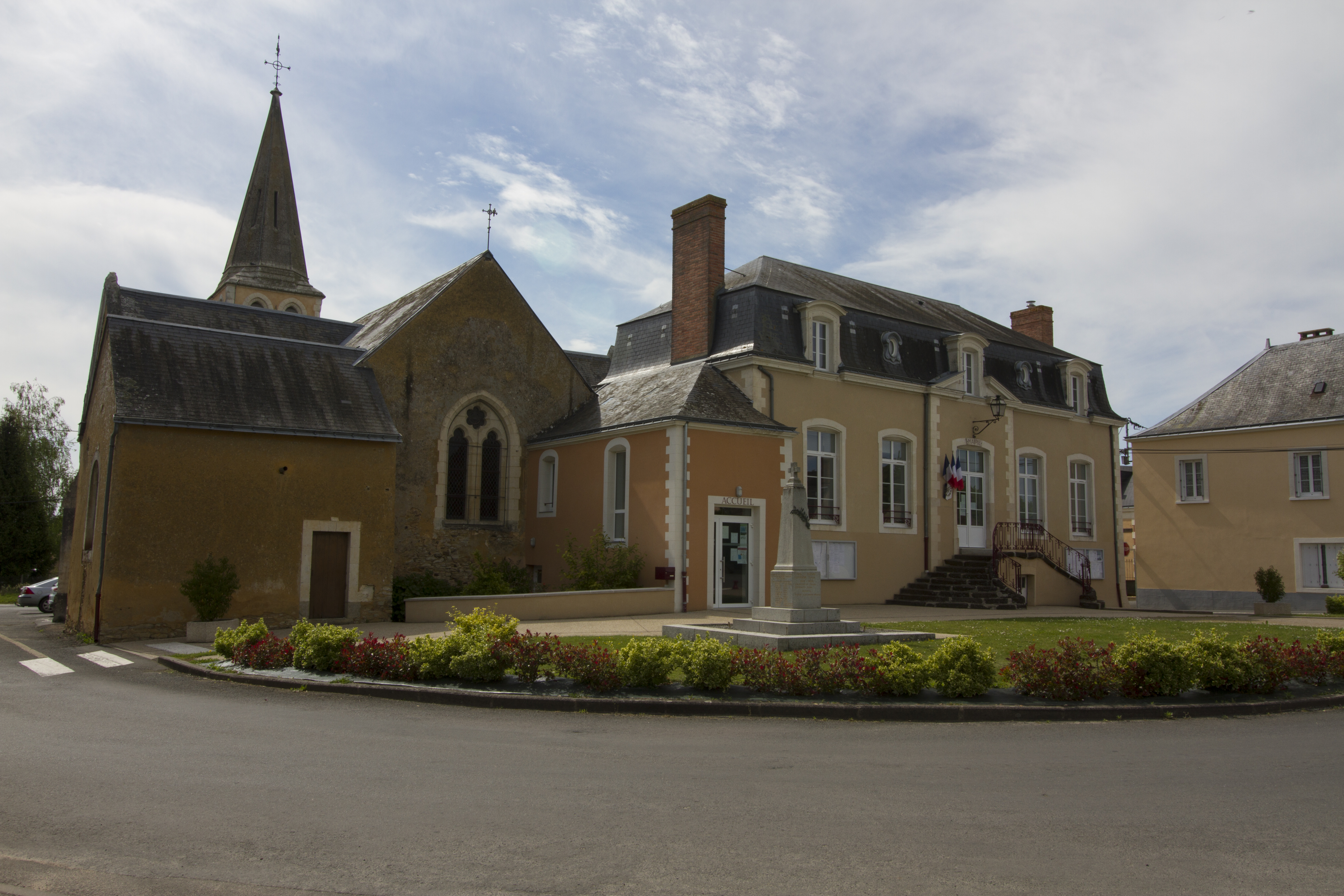
- Saint-Biez-en-Belin Town hall
- Location of Saint-Biez-en-Belin
- Location within France Location within Pays de la Loire
- Coordinates: 47°49′19″N 0°14′09″E
- Country: France
- Region: Pays de la Loire
- Department: Sarthe
- Arrondissement: Le Mans
- Canton: Écommoy
- Intercommunality: Orée de Bercé Bélinois

Government
  - Mayor (2020–2026): Jean-Claude Bizeray
- Area^{1}: 9.27 km^{2} (3.58 sq mi)
- Highest elevation: 86 m (282 ft)
- Lowest elevation: 56 m (184 ft)
- Population (2023): 710
  - Density: 77/km^{2} (200/sq mi)
- Demonym(s): Biézois, Biézoise
- Time zone: UTC+01:00 (CET)
  - Summer (DST): UTC+02:00 (CEST)
- INSEE/Postal code: 72268 /72220
- ^{1} French Land Register data, which excludes lakes, ponds, glaciers > 1 km^{2} (0.386 sq mi or 247 acres) and river estuaries.

Saint-Biez-en-Belin is a commune in the Sarthe department in the region of Pays de la Loire in north-western France.

== See also ==
- Communes of the Sarthe department
