= Mulsanne =

- Commune
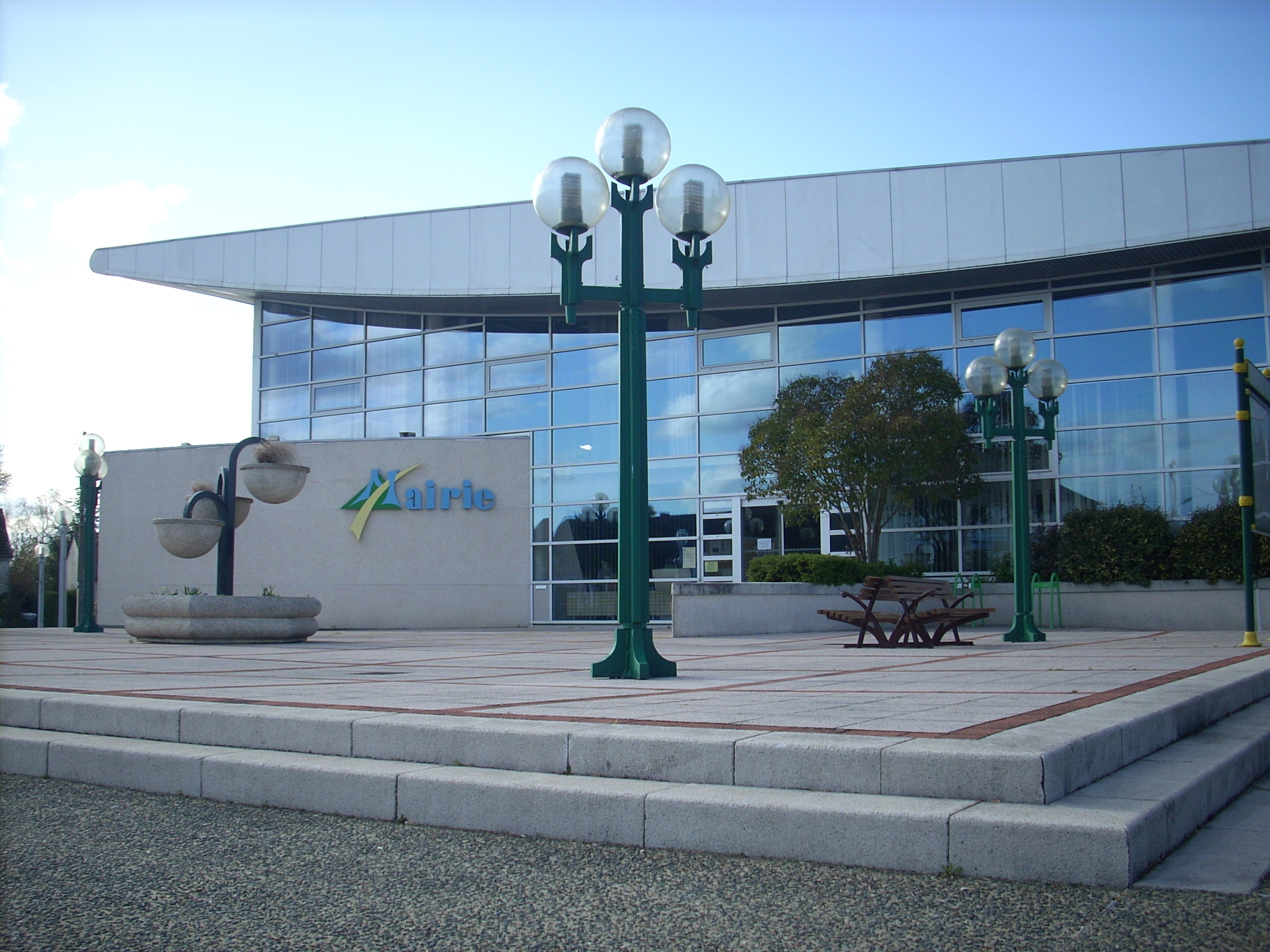
- The town hall of Mulsanne

- Coat of arms
- Location of Mulsanne
- Location within France Location within Pays de la Loire
- Coordinates: 47°54′29″N 0°14′53″E
- Country: France
- Region: Pays de la Loire
- Department: Sarthe
- Arrondissement: Le Mans
- Canton: Écommoy
- Intercommunality: Le Mans Métropole

Government
  - Mayor (2020–2026): Jean-Yves Lecoq
- Area^{1}: 15.25 km^{2} (5.89 sq mi)
- Highest elevation: 82 m (269 ft)
- Lowest elevation: 44 m (144 ft)
- Population (2023): 5,244
  - Density: 343.9/km^{2} (890.6/sq mi)
- Demonym: Mulsannais
- Time zone: UTC+01:00 (CET)
  - Summer (DST): UTC+02:00 (CEST)
- INSEE/Postal code: 72213 /72230
- ^{1} French Land Register data, which excludes lakes, ponds, glaciers > 1 km^{2} (0.386 sq mi or 247 acres) and river estuaries.

Mulsanne (French pronunciation: [mylsan]) is a commune in the Sarthe department in the region of Pays de la Loire in north-western France.

== Population ==
Historical population
Year	Pop.	±% p.a.
1968	891	—
1975	3,055	+19.25%
1982	3,776	+3.07%
1990	5,058	+3.72%
1999	5,213	+0.34%
2007	4,566	−1.64%
2012	4,610	+0.19%
2017	5,238	+2.59%
2023	5,244	+0.02%
Source: INSEE

== Motor racing ==
The Circuit de la Sarthe, which is used in the sports car endurance race 24 Hours of Le Mans, features the long straight Ligne Droite des Hunaudières leading to Mulsanne, making a tight right hand turn before the entrance of the village itself. The famous straight is often called the Mulsanne Straight in English.

== See also ==
- Communes of the Sarthe department
