= Belín =

Belín Bellény
- Municipality
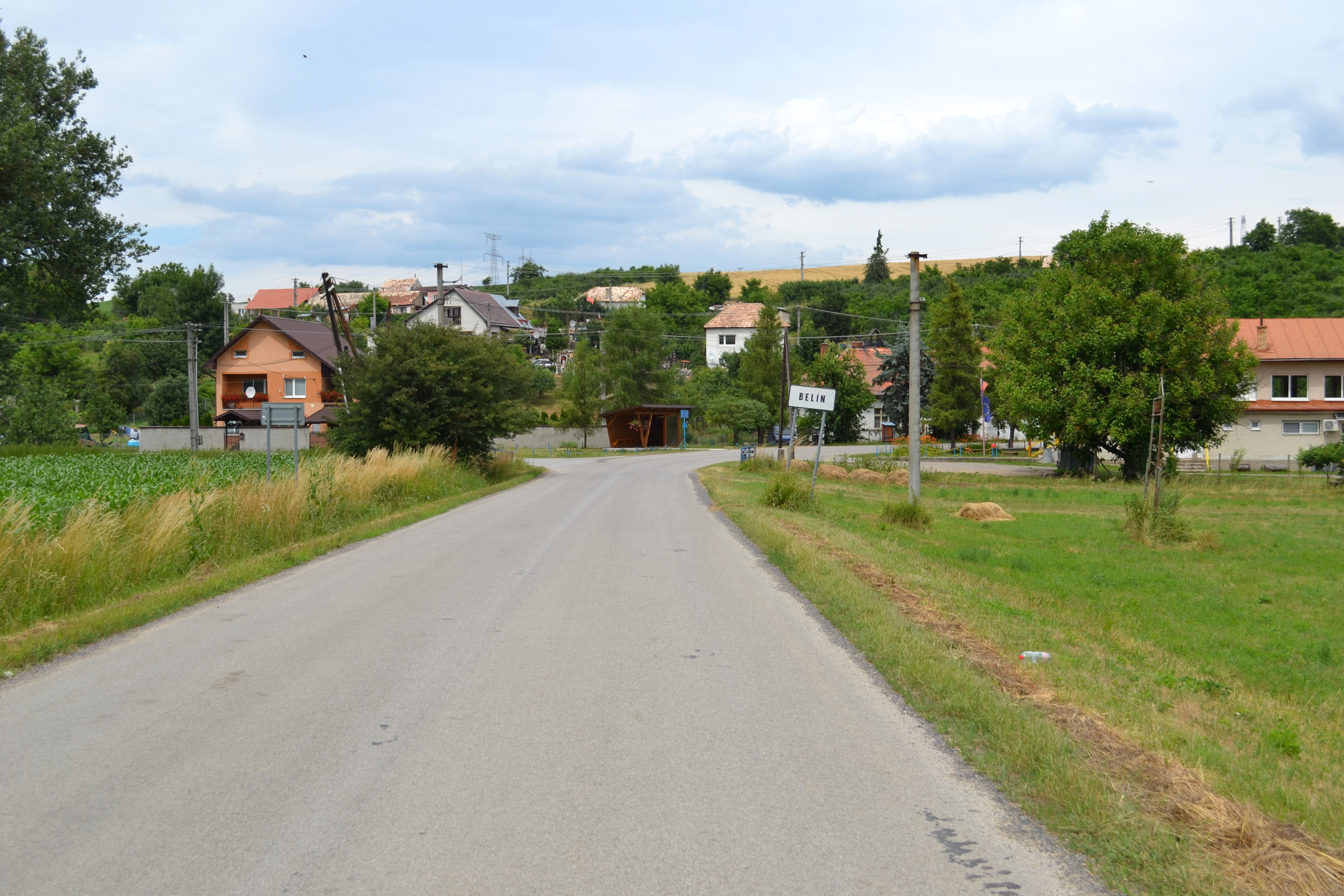

- Flag

- Location of Belín in the Banská Bystrica Region Location of Belín in Slovakia
- Coordinates: 48.35°N 20.12°E
- Country: Slovakia
- Region: Banská Bystrica Region
- District: Rimavská Sobota District
- First mentioned: 1349

Area
  - Total: 4.19 km^{2} (1.62 sq mi)
- Elevation: 219 m (719 ft)

Population (2025)
  - Total: 177
- Time zone: UTC+1 (CET)
  - Summer (DST): UTC+2 (CEST)
- Postal code: 980 01
- Area code: +421 47
- Vehicle registration plate (until 2022): RS
- Website: obecbelin.sk

Belín (Hungarian: Bellény) is a village and municipality in the Rimavská Sobota District of the Banská Bystrica Region of southern Slovakia. In the village is foodstuff store, public library and football pitch. Important sightseeing is late-classical church.

== Geography ==
The municipality lies at an altitude of 219 metres (719 ft) and covers an area of 4.19 km^{2} (1.62 sq mi) (2025).

== History ==
The village arose in the late 12th century. In historical records the village was first mentioned in 1349. In 1823 had been in the village 23 houses. Locals were engaged in agriculture and a hand made production of brooms and brushes.

== Population ==
Population statistic (10 years)
Year	1995	2005	2015	2025
Count	159	164	194	177
Difference		+3.14%	+18.29%	−8.76%

Population statistic
Year	2024	2025
Count	176	177
Difference		+0.56%

It has a population of 177 people (31 December 2025).

=== Ethnicity ===
Census 2021 (1+ %)
Ethnicity	Number	Fraction
Slovak	140	78.21%
Hungarian	44	24.58%
Romani	5	2.79%
Not found out	5	2.79%
Total	179	

In year 2021 was 179 people by ethnicity 140 as Slovak, 44 as Hungarian, 5 as Romani, 5 as Not found out and 1 as Austrian.

Note on population: The difference values of population numbers in the table "Population statistic" and in the sections "Ethnicity" & "Religion" is caused by the use of various statistical methods.

=== Religion ===
Census 2021 (1+ %)
Religion	Number	Fraction
Roman Catholic Church	128	71.51%
None	30	16.76%
Jehovah's Witnesses	8	4.47%
Evangelical Church	5	2.79%
Not found out	4	2.23%
Calvinist Church	3	1.68%
Total	179	

In year 2021 was 179 people by religion 128 from Roman Catholic Church, 30 from None, 8 from Jehovah's Witnesses, 5 from Evangelical Church, 4 from Not found out, 3 from Calvinist Church and 1 from Greek Catholic Church.

== See also ==
- List of municipalities and towns in Slovakia

== Genealogical resources ==
The records for genealogical research are available at the state archive "Statny Archiv in Banska Bystrica, Slovakia"

- Roman Catholic church records (births/marriages/deaths): 1768-1878 (parish B)
- Reformated church records (births/marriages/deaths): 1780-1897 (parish B)
