= Isaac Beilin =

Imperial Russian teacher and physician

Isaac Wulfovich Beilin (Russian: Исаак Вульфович Бейлин; died March 9, 1897) was an Imperial Russian teacher and physician.

== Biography ==
Beilin graduated from the Rabbinical School of Vilna, and subsequently held the position of senior teacher there for seventeen years, until the school was closed by order of the government. He then, at the age of forty, began to study medicine, and, after graduating from the Academy of Medicine of St. Petersburg, was appointed military physician to the 107th Troitzky Regiment, which position he held until his death. He contributed some valuable articles on the Jewish question to the Yevreiskaya Biblioteka and to Razsvyet.

He died in Vilna on March 9, 1897.
