= Canton of Écommoy =

Coordinates: 47.83°N 0.28°E

The canton of Écommoy is an administrative division of the Sarthe department, northwestern France. Its borders were modified at the French canton reorganisation which came into effect in March 2015. Its seat is in Écommoy.

It consists of the following communes:

1. Écommoy
2. Laigné-Saint-Gervais
3. Marigné-Laillé
4. Moncé-en-Belin
5. Mulsanne
6. Ruaudin
7. Saint-Biez-en-Belin
8. Saint-Ouen-en-Belin
9. Teloché
