= Marianites of Holy Cross =

Catholic congregation of nuns

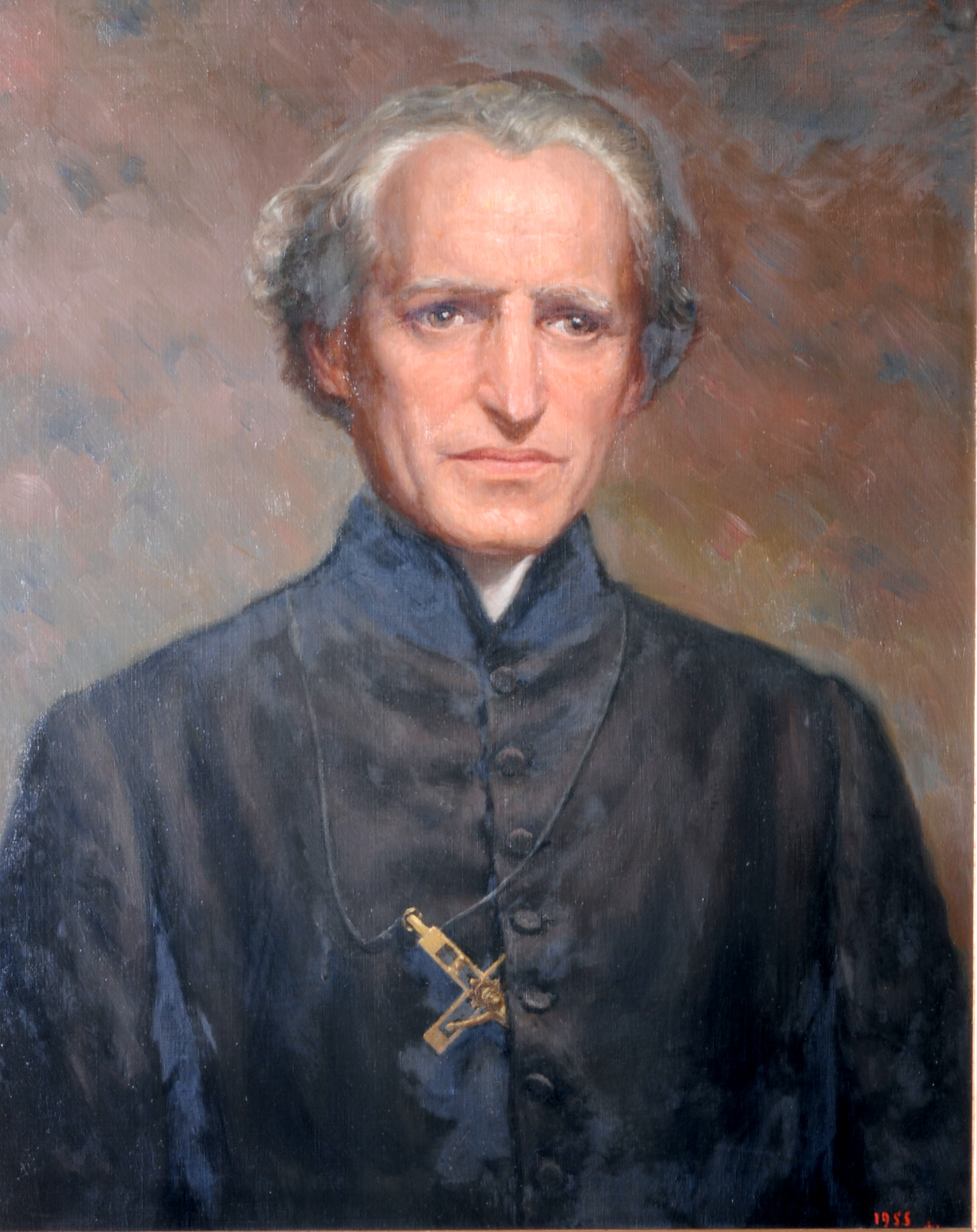
- Bl. Basil Anthony Moreau
- Abbreviation: MSC
- Formation: c. AD 1841; 185 years ago
- Founder: Blessed Father Basil Anthony-Marie Moreau, CSC
- Type: Catholic religious order
- Headquarters: United States of America
- Main organ: Congregation of Holy Cross
- Website: marianites.org

The Marianites of Holy Cross (MSC) is a Catholic congregation of nuns, founded in Le Mans, France, in 1841, by Fr Basil Moreau. It was founded as a third distinct society within the Congregation of Holy Cross. The Marianites of Holy Cross is now an independent congregation.

== History ==
=== Founders ===
==== Basil Moreau ====
In 1835 Father Basil Anthony Moreau, then assistant superior of the seminary at Le Mans, founded a group of priests to assist him in his endeavors to re-invigorate the Church throughout the diocese. He called them the Society of Auxiliary Priests. He also assumed supervision of the Brothers of St. Joseph when their founder Father Jacques Dujarié became too ill to continue their direction. In 1837 the two organizations were combined to form the Association of the Holy Cross.

The following year he gave a rule of life to a group of devout laywomen who assisted the priests and brothers, first by doing domestic work, then in teaching and nursing. These women became the Marianites of Holy Cross. In 1841 the first Marianites received the religious habit. The Marianites were dedicated to Mary, under the title of Our Lady of Seven Dolors. The women of Holy Cross came to form three distinct congregations: Marianites of Holy Cross, Sisters of the Holy Cross, and Sisters of Holy Cross.

==== Léocadie Romaine Gascoin ====
Léocadie Romaine Gascoin was born 1818 in Montenay, the 4th of 6 children. Her parents were middle-class farmers. Her mother died in 1822. Léocadie spent most of her early life at home taking care of her family. 1841 she became one of the first Marianites, entered the novitiate in Le Mans. She received her religious formation with the Sisters of the Good Shepherd at their monastery in Le Mans. Gascoin pronounced first vows in 1844 and the following year she was named the first Superior General of the Marianites, taking the name Mother Mary of Seven Dolors (Mère Marie des Sept Douleurs). She died in 1900 in Le Mans.

== Expansion ==
As the congregation grew throughout the 1840s and early 1850s in the United States and Canada, Fr. Moreau sent groups of priests, brothers and sisters to work together and support each other's mission within the Family of Holy Cross. The sisters initially supported the priests and brothers by providing domestic services.

At the request of Célestine Guynemer de la Hailandière, Bishop of Vincennes, Moreau sent some sisters who established in 1844, in Bertrand, Michigan, a school for girls. By 1855, this school moved the 6 miles to Notre Dame, Indiana to become Saint Mary's College, still one of the leading Catholic women's liberal arts colleges.

In 1846 Bishop Ignace Bourget of Montreal asked Moreau, whom he had visited at Holy Cross, to send him sisters whom he might establish in his diocese. Four religious were sent in 1847 and founded their first house in the village of St. Lawrence, near Montreal.

In 1856, Rome approved the constitutions of Holy Cross for the men. Doubting the propriety of a mixed congregation of men and women, Rome separated the women into an independent community at that time. Fr. Moreau, in his role as their founder, continued to work for Rome's approval of the sisters' constitution. In 1885, Rome approved the constitutions of the Marianites of Holy Cross, granting them the status of "congregation" within the Church.

Meanwhile, the sisters set up schools in New Orleans, Louisiana, Le Mans, France and Quebec, Canada. The unity of the Marianites of Holy Cross would not last long: competing authorities at Notre Dame and Le Mans, complicated by slow communications over large distances, led to the withdrawal of the sisters at Indiana in 1867 and Quebec in 1883. They formed two new, independent congregations: the Sisters of the Holy Cross at Notre Dame, Indiana, and the Sisters of Holy Cross at Montreal, Quebec.

=== Louisiana ===
In 1849 three Marianite sisters traveled from France to New Orleans and opened an orphanage for boys. In 1866 they set up Holy Angels Academy, a high school for girls in the Bywater historic district. With the opening of the Archdiocesan Archbishop Hannan High School in Meraux, enrollment was reduced and Holy Angels closed in 1992.

In 1965 the Marianites of Holy Cross founded Our Lady of Prompt Succor Nursing Home to provide long-term health care and short term rehabilitation services to the surrounding communities. C'est la Vie Independent Living Center for seniors was added in March 1986.

The Marianites of Holy Cross continue to work in their traditional geographical areas of Le Mans, France and New Orleans, Louisiana. They continue to operate several significant institutions including: Our Lady of Holy Cross College, founded in New Orleans in 1916 and Holy Family School, in Port Allen, Louisiana, founded in 1949. As of 2016 there were 140 sisters worldwide.

== Recent events ==
Sister Suellen Tennyson, age 83, who was at one time head of the congregation was kidnapped on the night of 4–5 April 2022 while working in Burkina Faso. She was released on 29 August through the efforts of the U.S. government, which thanked the government of Niger for its assistance in obtaining her release.

== See also ==
- Holy Family Elementary School (Port Allen, LA)
