= Cantons of the Sarthe department =

The following is a list of the 21 cantons of the Sarthe department, in France, following the French canton reorganisation which came into effect in March 2015:

- Bonnétable
- Changé
- Écommoy
- La Ferté-Bernard
- La Flèche
- Loué
- Le Lude
- Mamers
- Le Mans-1
- Le Mans-2
- Le Mans-3
- Le Mans-4
- Le Mans-5
- Le Mans-6
- Le Mans-7
- Montval-sur-Loir
- Sablé-sur-Sarthe
- Saint-Calais
- Savigné-l'Évêque
- Sillé-le-Guillaume
- La Suze-sur-Sarthe
