= Trait du Maine =

Extinct draft horse breed from Maine, France

Trait du Main
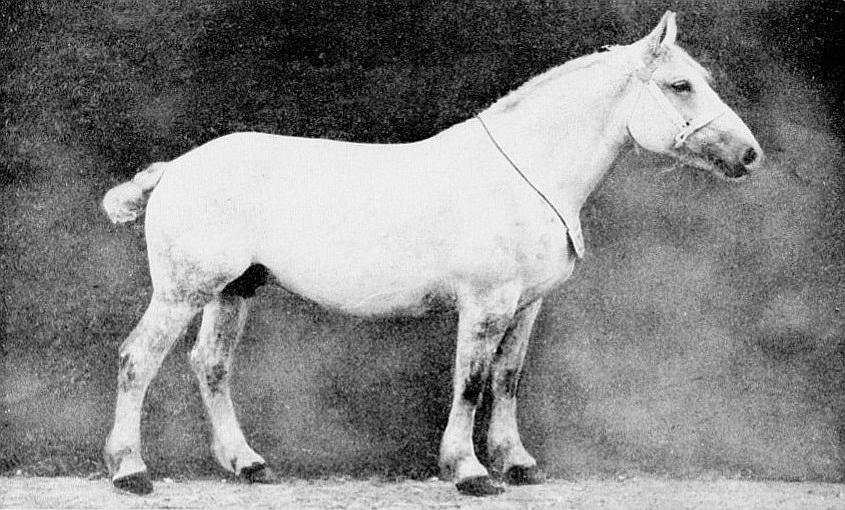
- Four-year-old gray stallion c. 1930

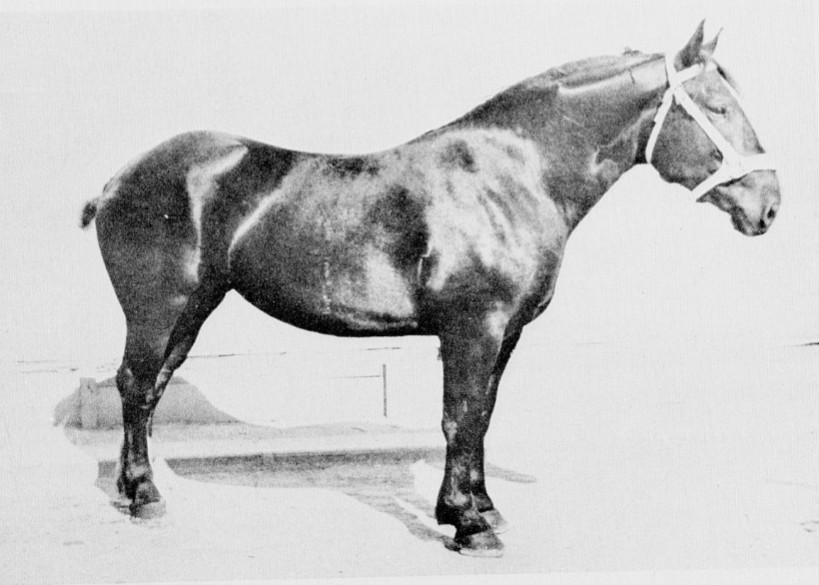
- 3-year-old filly c. 1930
- Conservation status: extinct
- Country of origin: France

Traits
- Height: 1.60 m to 1.65 m recommended, up to 1.70 m
- Color: Black or grey coat
- Distinguishing features: Long head, straight profile

The Trait du Maine is an extinct draft horse breed originating from the region of Maine in northwestern France. Bred from the 1830s onwards by crossing mares from Mayenne with Percheron stallions, it had its own studbook due to the Percheron Horse Society refusing to include horses born outside of the Perche region. The Trait du Maine was officially recognized as a horse breed in 1926 and had up to 25,000 annual births in 1929. These horses were mainly exported to the agricultural regions of Beauce, France and Spain. In 1966, the Trait du Maine merged their studbook with the Percheron breed, which absorbed it, leading to the elimination of the Trait du Maine as a distinct breed.

== History ==
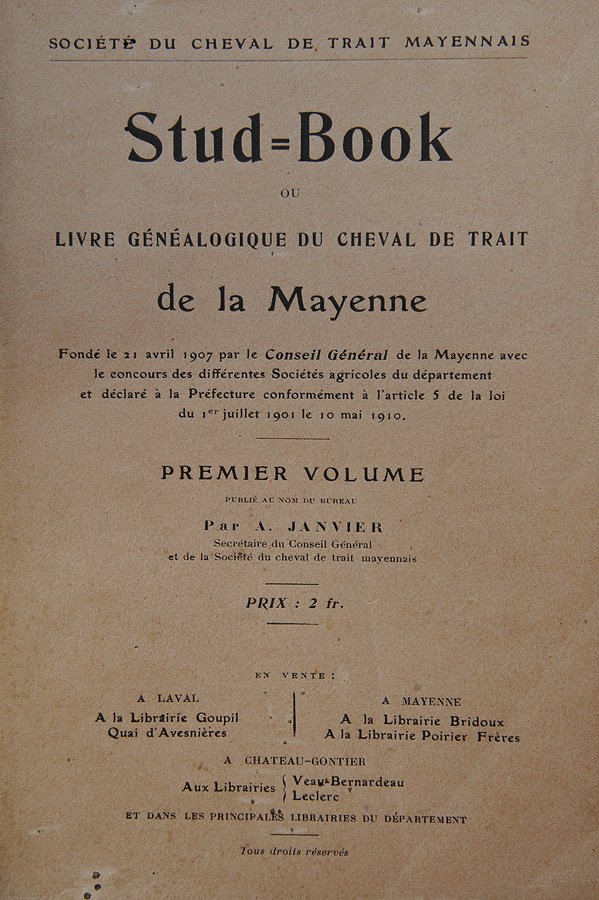
Studbook of the draft horse of Mayenne, published in 1907

This draft horse is also known as the "Mayennais" or "Mayenne." The Trait du Maine breeding began in the 1830s when agricultural societies in Mayenne recommended crossing local Mayenne mares with Percheron stallions. Since the soil and climate of Perche and Mayenne were similar, they had hoped crossing with Percherons would improve Mayenne's working horses.

Two different dates are mentioned for the creation of the studbook. According to the Agricultural Monograph of the Mayenne Department, the department created a "Studbook of the Draft Horse of Mayenne" in 1896, allocating significant funds for it. According to the Annals of Brittany and Western France, the "Studbook of the Mayenne Draft Horse" was created in 1907. The presentation of the breed at the Paris Horse Congress (Note: Congrès hippique de Paris) in 1909 elicited praise from Mr. Lavalard: "The horses of Mayenne show the effects of a more methodical breeding; the mares and fillies now stand out for the solidity of their limbs, the correctness of their forms, and the freedom of their gaits.” Mayenne provided about 10,000 horses for World War I, which significantly disrupted breeding, despite efforts by the Ministry of Agriculture to preserve the best broodmares.

In 1922, the department of Maine-et-Loire succeeded in creating a "Maine-Anjou" section in the French draft horse studbook, leading to the establishment of the "Society of the Maine-Anjou Draft Horse" the same year. Breeders from Sarthe tried to align with the Percheron Horse Society of France (Note: Société Hippique Percheronne de France) but were unsuccessful. Indeed, the breeders' union of the Percheron refused to register animals born outside of Perche, which excluded breeders from Mayenne, Sarthe, and Maine-et-Loire. In response, Sarthe breeders founded the "Trait du Maine Studbook." and its society, chaired by Mr. D'Andigné, whose purview included the 16 Sarthe cantons excluded by the Percheron Horse Society. Their goal was both to promote the quality of their animals and to benefit from state subsidies for this breeding. Initially, they did not intend to create a new breed, but rather to have a breeding society for their "Percheron-type" horses born outside the designated area. They received subsidies from the Sarthe County Council for organizing breeding competitions in Le Mans, and for managing the studbook, although this caused tensions with breeders outside of Perche who did not wish to register with the Trait du Maine Studbook. In two years, they registered 1,800 mares.

On May 16, 1925, they joined forces with draft horse breeders from Mayenne and Maine-et-Loire to establish the "Union of Breeding Syndicates of the Trait du Maine Horse", define a breed standard, and unify their selection method. The following year, the breed was officially recognized as the "Trait du Maine", subsidized for the purchase of departmental stallions, and admitted to the Central Horse Show in Paris with 40,000 francs in prizes to be distributed. Breeding these horses became intensive, especially in Mayenne. Significant progress was made in just a few years, notably due to the presentation of animals at the Central Horse Show in Paris. In L'Ouest-Éclair newspaper, on July 24, 1929, a "breeder, who is interested in the future of the Maine Horse, notes that a "noticeable improvement seems to have occurred, although the number of exhibitors does not increase". He adds that "Many breeders, who own elite subjects, are deterred by the expenses of a trip to Paris, with the concern of being absent from home for a week during haymaking season". The majority of the exhibited horses come from Mayenne.

The breeding area of the Trait du Maine was clearly defined, subject to an order published in the Official Journal of the French Republic, following an order on May 29, 1917. The territorial jurisdiction was limited to the departments of Mayenne, Maine-et-Loire (in the North), and the cantons of Sarthe not included in the jurisdiction of the Percheron Horse Society, especially in the Bocage Mayenne. In the Mayenne department alone, in 1929, 48,000 Trait du Maine mares were used for reproduction each year, for 25,000 annual foal births. The Union des Syndicats d'Élevage du Cheval de Trait du Maine, headquartered in Le Mans, organized the selection of the breed. The Departmental Council of Mayenne was responsible for the administration of the Trait du Maine studbook, the Mayenne departmental agricultural competition, the distribution of subsidies for breeding, and organizing competitions. Applicants to the studbook were examined by three members, including a veterinarian. A brand representing the letters "SM" was applied to the upper third of the left side of the neck and the owner received an identification card for their animal.

According to Marcel Mavré, the decline in draft horse numbers following World War II motivated a reorganization, and in 1966 breeds near Perche which had their own studbooks were merged into the Percheron studbook. The Trait du Maine was integrated into the Percheron stud book in 1966 according to the 2016 edition of the CAB International encyclopedia.

== Characteristics ==
The Trait du Maine was similar to the Percheron, although smaller and stockier. It was used for all types of draft work, especially in agriculture. The breed standard, published in 1930, indicates an average height of 1.60 m for mares and 1.65 m for males. However, at the central equestrian competition in Paris, horses measuring 1.70 m were awarded prizes. Heavier and shorter animals were preferred. The horses were described as gentle and quiet.

The head was long, with a straight profile, a broad and flat forehead. The neck was long and powerful. The body was well-developed and muscular. The pasterns were rather short, with little to no feathering on the lower legs.

The breed society allowed black and gray coats, as also noted by Marcel Mavré. However, according to the CIRAD dictionary of animal sciences, the coat was "often" black. The preference between dark or light coat was the subject of discussions among breeders, with light gray horses being less favored than dark gray and black ones.

== See also ==
- List of French horse breeds
