= La Milesse =

- Commune
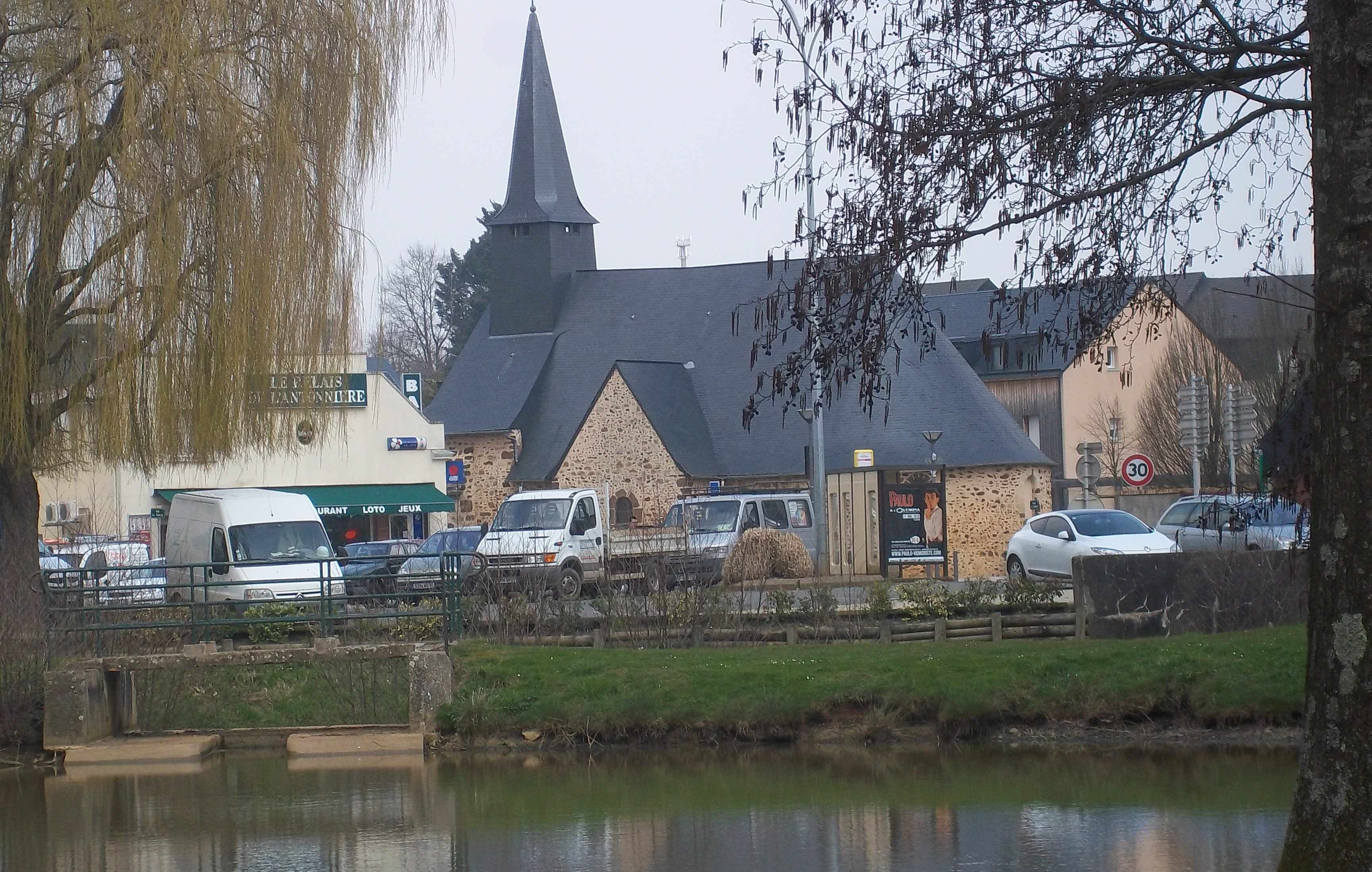
- The water and church at La Milesse
- Location of La Milesse
- Location within France Location within Pays de la Loire
- Coordinates: 48°03′55″N 0°08′11″E
- Country: France
- Region: Pays de la Loire
- Department: Sarthe
- Arrondissement: Le Mans
- Canton: Le Mans-2
- Intercommunality: Le Mans Métropole

Government
  - Mayor (2020–2026): Claude Loriot
- Area^{1}: 10.41 km^{2} (4.02 sq mi)
- Highest elevation: 129 m (423 ft)
- Lowest elevation: 48 m (157 ft)
- Population (2023): 2,617
  - Density: 251.4/km^{2} (651.1/sq mi)
- Demonym(s): Milessois, Milessoise
- Time zone: UTC+01:00 (CET)
  - Summer (DST): UTC+02:00 (CEST)
- INSEE/Postal code: 72198 /72650
- ^{1} French Land Register data, which excludes lakes, ponds, glaciers > 1 km^{2} (0.386 sq mi or 247 acres) and river estuaries.

La Milesse (French pronunciation: [la milɛs]) is a commune in the Sarthe department in the region of Pays de la Loire in north-western France.

== Population ==
Historical population
Year	Pop.	±% p.a.
1968	726	—
1975	1,241	+7.96%
1982	1,548	+3.21%
1990	2,117	+3.99%
1999	2,264	+0.75%
2007	2,476	+1.13%
2012	2,359	−0.96%
2017	2,640	+2.28%
2023	2,617	−0.15%
Source: INSEE

== See also ==
- Communes of the Sarthe department
