= Saint-Saturnin, Sarthe =

Saint-Saturnin
- Commune
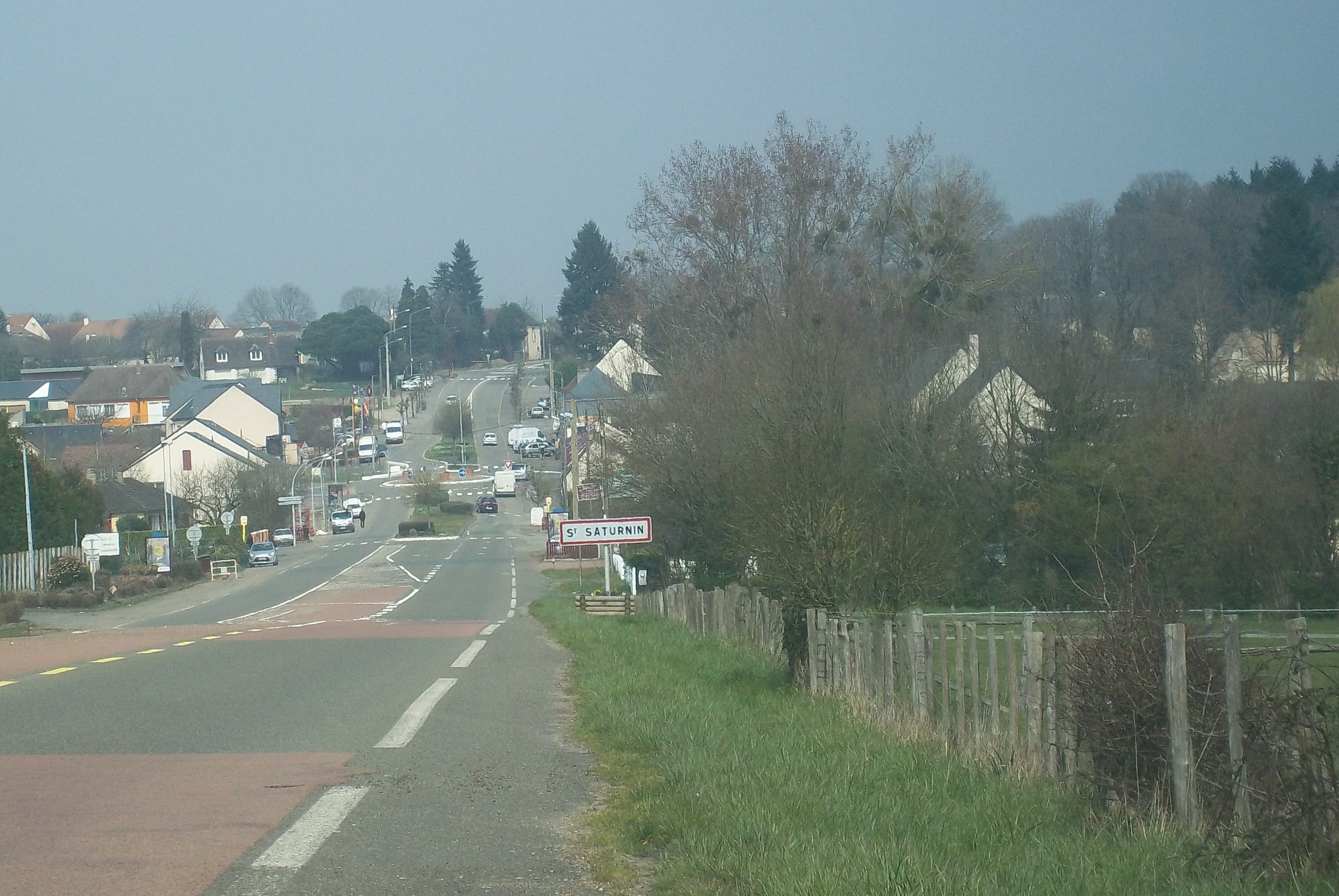
- The road into Saint-Saturnin

- Coat of arms
- Location of Saint-Saturnin
- Location within France Location within Pays de la Loire
- Coordinates: 48°03′29″N 0°09′07″E
- Country: France
- Region: Pays de la Loire
- Department: Sarthe
- Arrondissement: Le Mans
- Canton: Le Mans-2
- Intercommunality: Le Mans Métropole

Government
  - Mayor (2020–2026): Yvan Goulette
- Area^{1}: 9.66 km^{2} (3.73 sq mi)
- Highest elevation: 100 m (330 ft)
- Lowest elevation: 43 m (141 ft)
- Population (2023): 2,774
  - Density: 287/km^{2} (744/sq mi)
- Demonym(s): Saint-Sannien, Saint-Sannienne
- Time zone: UTC+01:00 (CET)
  - Summer (DST): UTC+02:00 (CEST)
- INSEE/Postal code: 72320 /72650
- ^{1} French Land Register data, which excludes lakes, ponds, glaciers > 1 km^{2} (0.386 sq mi or 247 acres) and river estuaries.

Saint-Saturnin (French pronunciation: [sɛ̃ satyʁnɛ̃]) is a commune in the Sarthe department in the region of Pays de la Loire in north-western France.

== Population ==
Historical population
Year	Pop.	±% p.a.
1968	592	—
1975	849	+5.29%
1982	1,206	+5.14%
1990	1,697	+4.36%
1999	1,995	+1.81%
2007	2,271	+1.63%
2012	2,516	+2.07%
2017	2,529	+0.10%
2023	2,774	+1.55%
Source: INSEE

== See also ==
- Communes of the Sarthe department
