= Rouillon =

- Commune
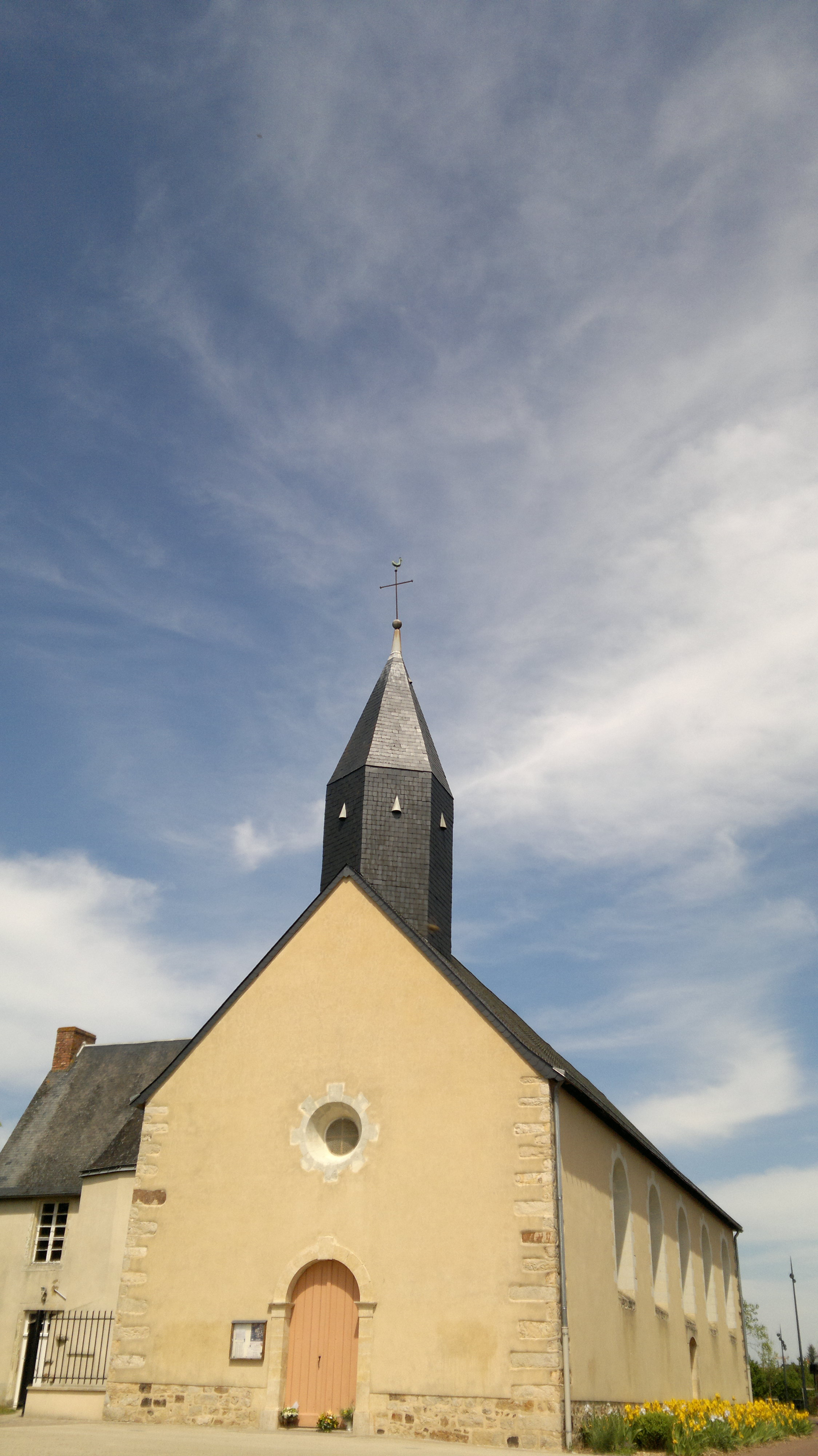
- The church of Notre-Dame
- Location of Rouillon
- Location within France Location within Pays de la Loire
- Coordinates: 48°00′30″N 0°08′13″E
- Country: France
- Region: Pays de la Loire
- Department: Sarthe
- Arrondissement: Le Mans
- Canton: Le Mans-1
- Intercommunality: Le Mans Métropole

Government
  - Mayor (2020–2026): Laurent Paris
- Area^{1}: 9.15 km^{2} (3.53 sq mi)
- Highest elevation: 127 m (417 ft)
- Lowest elevation: 52 m (171 ft)
- Population (2023): 2,382
  - Density: 260/km^{2} (674/sq mi)
- Demonym(s): Rouillonnais, Rouillonnaise
- Time zone: UTC+01:00 (CET)
  - Summer (DST): UTC+02:00 (CEST)
- INSEE/Postal code: 72257 /72700
- ^{1} French Land Register data, which excludes lakes, ponds, glaciers > 1 km^{2} (0.386 sq mi or 247 acres) and river estuaries.

Rouillon (French pronunciation: [ʁujɔ̃]) is a commune in the Sarthe department in the Pays de la Loire region in north-western France.

== Population ==
Historical population
Year	Pop.	±% p.a.
1968	684	—
1975	864	+3.39%
1982	1,450	+7.68%
1990	1,592	+1.17%
1999	2,101	+3.13%
2007	2,145	+0.26%
2012	2,266	+1.10%
2017	2,259	−0.06%
2023	2,382	+0.89%
Source: INSEE

== See also ==
- Communes of the Sarthe department
