= Yves Jumeau =

French artist (born 1955)

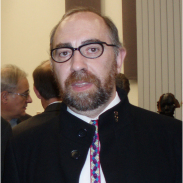
- Born: 7 August 1955 (age 70); Le Mans, France
- Known for: Installation Art, Sculpture, Glass Casting
- Notable work: Kundalini

Yves Jumeau is a French artist who was born in 1955 in Le Mans, France.

== Biography ==
Son of a glass-work master, Yves was initiated to arts from his earliest days. He was five years old when he created his first stained glass panel. While he was studying, he collaborated from time to time with his father to the creation and restoration of stained glass.

He had many different professional experiences, among which being the director of a company, which didn't give him any satisfactions corresponding to his aspiration. He thus stopped those activities and undertook studies in electronics. He graduated in sound engineering and show technician light manager. :Of this development, derives nowadays all the freedom we find in his artistic expression", considers Jung-Chou Lin.

Yves Jumeau, as a self-taught artist, directs his focus to glass work in new ways: that of volume, of sculpture. Since May 1984 his works have been exhibited (Le Mans congress centre, Vittel,...), and they appeared for the first time in galleries in 1986 (Galerie Art Objet in Angoulême, Galerie Artitude in Paris).

Yves Jumeau explored many fields in contemporary art. He made sculptures, installation art, organized events (Tree of knowledge est mort, A ma Lulu forever...), and he also contributed to stage lightning for the movie art industry. He is a specialist of glass casting, and his works include such medias as metal, bronze, plaster, fabrics, sound environment, x-rays, etc.

"From the smallest, we get into gigantic works with his monumental glass settings for public places. For Yves Jumeau's creativity has no limit, he displays statues for us, faces, which are several meters high, held up by an inner stainless steel structures, worthy of the Statue of Liberty" considers Christian Germak.

== Crystallization ==
His work on crystallization, starting in 2008, is a meeting point with Marcel Duchamp's ready-made concepts. Yves Jumeau's crystallization concept consists covering emblematic objects with glass crystals, thus creating a coating which expresses both time passing by and protection. The object is thus petrified and plunged into "a sort of fixation of time and space".

"Yves Jumeau's art work is a way of appropriating objects, concepts and environments. It is a way of absorbing them, phagocyte them to present them to us, deprived of the function and temporality. Their symbolic value is thus protected for eternity as it seems", considers Hsu.

Rolls-Royce, clothes, art objects, etc. are privileged supports for crystallization.

== Sources ==
- Bloch, Janine (1988). Le verre en France, les années 1980. France.
- Bray, Charles (1995). Dictionary of glass. United Kingdom: A&C Black.
- Jung-Chou Lin (2002). From shadow to light, from the past to the future. Taiwan: Hsinchu Art Museum. ISBN 957-01-1685-4.
- Philippe, Joseph (1989). Sculptures contemporaines en cristal et verre en Europe. Luxemburg: Général de banque.
- Philippe, Joseph (1992). Sculptures contemporaines en cristal et en verre des pays de la Communauté européenne. Luxemburg: Général de banque.
- Philippe, Joseph (1996). Sculptures contemporaines en cristal et en verre des 15 pays de l'Union européenne. Luxemburg: Général de banque.
- Philippe, Joseph (2000). Sculptures contemporaines en cristal et en verre de 17 pays entre méditerranée et nord baltique. Luxemburg: Fortis Banque.
