= Le Mans Métropole =

Coordinates: 48.00°N 0.20°E

- Communauté urbaine
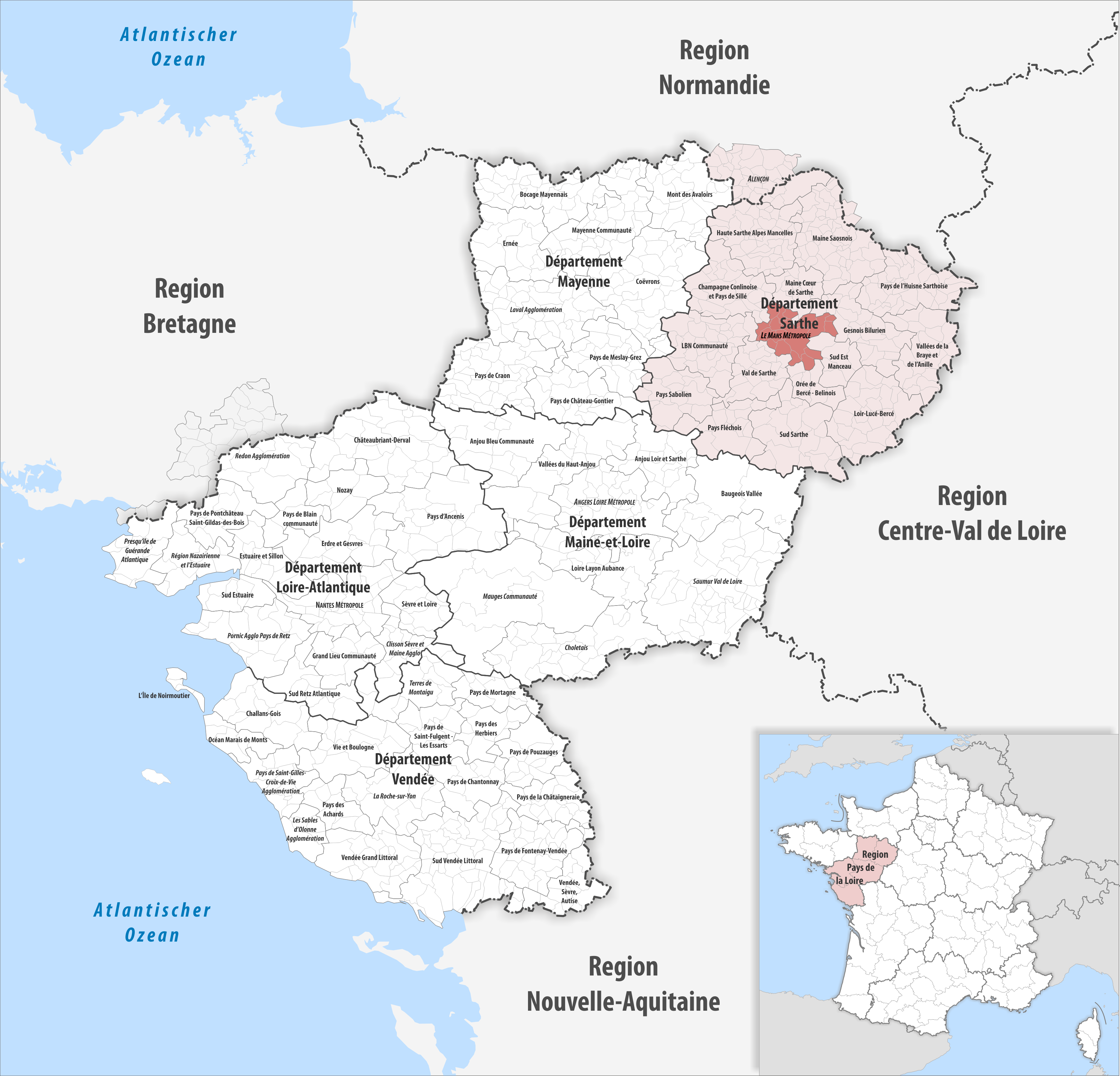
- Location within the Sarthe department
- Country: France
- Region: Pays de la Loire
- Department: Sarthe
- No. of communes: {{{nbcomm}}}
- Established: 1971
- Area: 272.5 km^{2} (105.2 sq mi)
- Population (2018): 209,557
  - Density: 769.0/km^{2} (1,992/sq mi)
- Website: www.lemansmetropole.fr

The Communauté urbaine Le Mans Métropole is the communauté urbaine, an intercommunal structure, centred on the city of Le Mans. It is located in the Sarthe department, in the Pays de la Loire region, northwestern France. It was created in November 1971. Its area is 272.5 km^{2}. Its population was 209,557 in 2020, of which 145,155 in Le Mans proper.

== Composition ==
Le Mans Métropole consists of the following 20 communes:

1. Aigné
2. Allonnes
3. Arnage
4. Champagné
5. La Chapelle-Saint-Aubin
6. Chaufour-Notre-Dame
7. Coulaines
8. Fatines
9. Fay
10. Le Mans
11. La Milesse
12. Mulsanne
13. Pruillé-le-Chétif
14. Rouillon
15. Ruaudin
16. Saint-Georges-du-Bois
17. Saint-Saturnin
18. Sargé-lès-le-Mans
19. Trangé
20. Yvré-l'Évêque
