= La Chapelle-Saint-Aubin =

- Commune
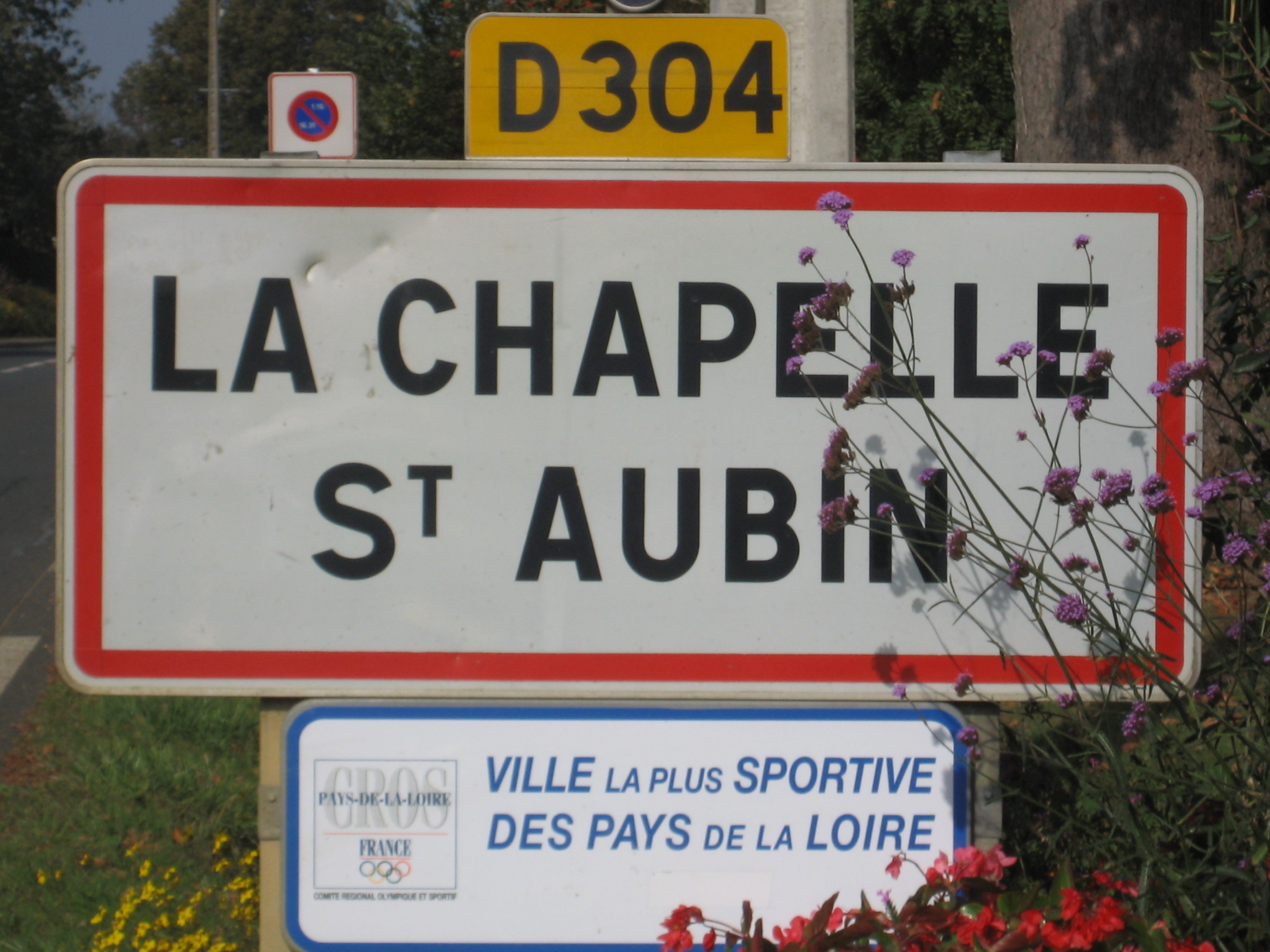
- A road sign at the entrance to La Chapelle-Saint-Aubin
- Location of La Chapelle-Saint-Aubin
- Location within France Location within Pays de la Loire
- Coordinates: 48°02′10″N 0°09′41″E
- Country: France
- Region: Pays de la Loire
- Department: Sarthe
- Arrondissement: Le Mans
- Canton: Le Mans-2
- Intercommunality: Le Mans Métropole

Government
  - Mayor (2020–2026): Joël Le Bolu
- Area^{1}: 5.93 km^{2} (2.29 sq mi)
- Highest elevation: 128 m (420 ft)
- Lowest elevation: 42 m (138 ft)
- Population (2023): 2,256
  - Density: 380/km^{2} (985/sq mi)
- Demonym(s): Capellaubinois, Capellaubinoise
- Time zone: UTC+01:00 (CET)
  - Summer (DST): UTC+02:00 (CEST)
- INSEE/Postal code: 72065 /72650
- ^{1} French Land Register data, which excludes lakes, ponds, glaciers > 1 km^{2} (0.386 sq mi or 247 acres) and river estuaries.

La Chapelle-Saint-Aubin (French pronunciation: [la ʃapɛl sɛ̃.t‿obɛ̃]) is a commune in the Sarthe department in the Pays de la Loire region in north-western France.

== Geography ==
La Chapelle-Saint-Aubin is located north of the city of Le Mans, on its outskirts. It is served by the Setram bus network, which connects it to Le Mans city center.

== Population ==
Historical population
Year	Pop.	±% p.a.
1968	678	—
1975	921	+4.47%
1982	1,559	+7.81%
1990	1,817	+1.93%
1999	2,094	+1.59%
2007	2,164	+0.41%
2012	2,209	+0.41%
2017	2,360	+1.33%
2023	2,256	−0.75%
Source: INSEE

== See also ==
- Communes of the Sarthe department
