= Coulaines =

- Commune
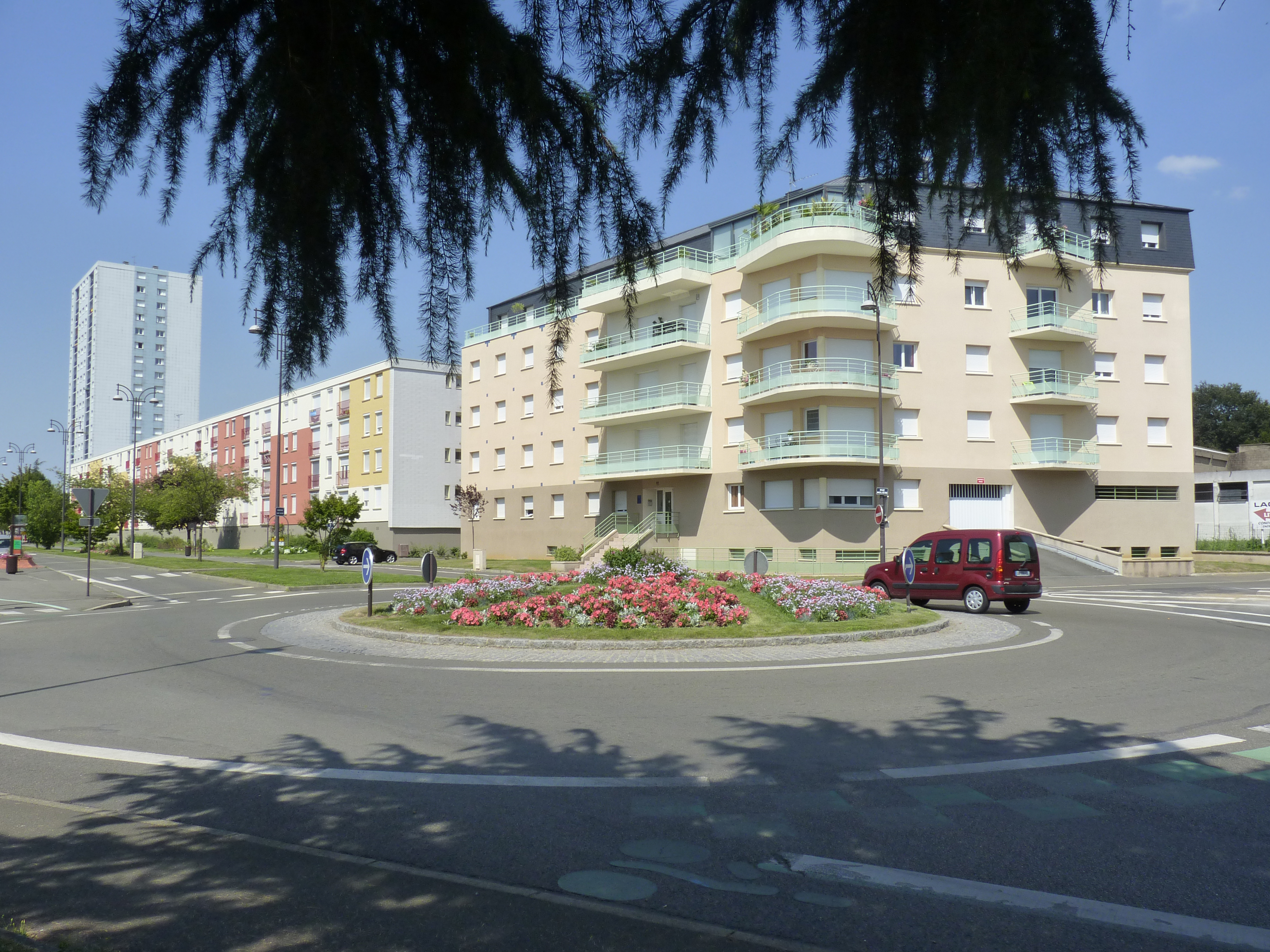
- The Boulevard Saint-Michel, in Coulaines
- Location of Coulaines
- Location within France Location within Pays de la Loire
- Coordinates: 48°01′36″N 0°12′15″E
- Country: France
- Region: Pays de la Loire
- Department: Sarthe
- Arrondissement: Le Mans
- Canton: Le Mans-4
- Intercommunality: Le Mans Métropole

Government
  - Mayor (2020–2026): Christophe Rouillon
- Area^{1}: 3.93 km^{2} (1.52 sq mi)
- Elevation: 91 m (299 ft)
- Highest elevation: 112 m (367 ft)
- Lowest elevation: 43 m (141 ft)
- Population (2023): 8,121
  - Density: 2,070/km^{2} (5,350/sq mi)
- Time zone: UTC+01:00 (CET)
  - Summer (DST): UTC+02:00 (CEST)
- INSEE/Postal code: 72095 /72190
- ^{1} French Land Register data, which excludes lakes, ponds, glaciers > 1 km^{2} (0.386 sq mi or 247 acres) and river estuaries.

Coulaines (French pronunciation: [kulɛn]) is a commune in the Sarthe department in the Pays de la Loire region in north-western France. Its sister city is Kitty Hawk, North Carolina, United States.

== Population ==
Historical population
Year	Pop.	±% p.a.
1968	3,721	—
1975	7,423	+10.37%
1982	7,291	−0.26%
1990	7,370	+0.13%
1999	7,544	+0.26%
2007	7,429	−0.19%
2012	7,687	+0.69%
2017	7,423	−0.70%
2023	8,121	+1.51%
Source: INSEE

== See also ==
- Communes of the Sarthe department
- Treaty of Coulaines
