= Aigné =

- Commune
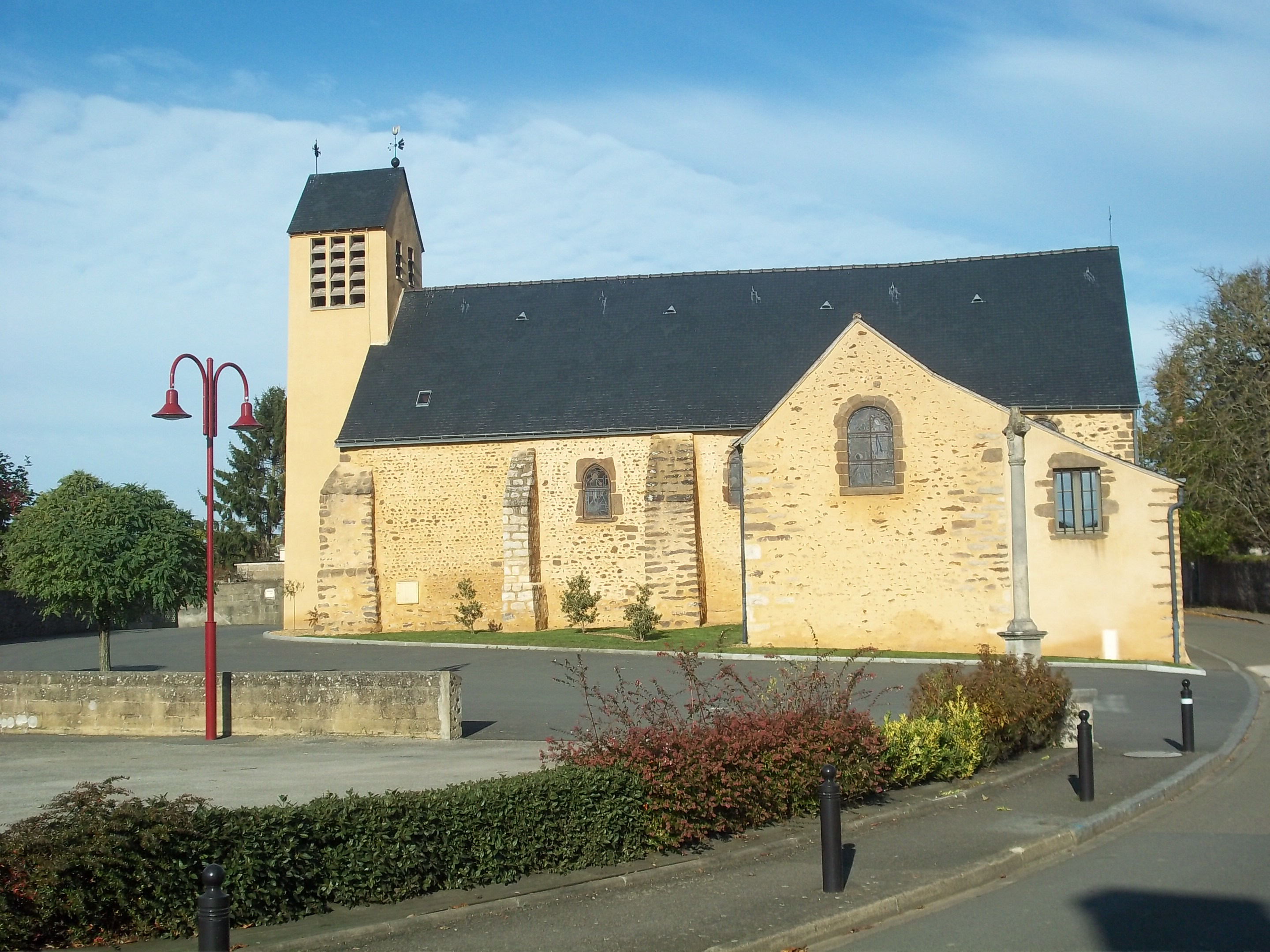
- The church of the Assumption

- Coat of arms
- Location of Aigné
- Location within France Location within Pays de la Loire
- Coordinates: 48°04′05″N 0°07′12″E
- Country: France
- Region: Pays de la Loire
- Department: Sarthe
- Arrondissement: Le Mans
- Canton: Le Mans-2
- Intercommunality: Le Mans Métropole

Government
  - Mayor (2020–2026): Karine Mullet
- Area^{1}: 12.59 km^{2} (4.86 sq mi)
- Highest elevation: 125 m (410 ft)
- Lowest elevation: 53 m (174 ft)
- Population (2023): 1,695
  - Density: 134.6/km^{2} (348.7/sq mi)
- Demonym(s): Aignéen, Aignéenne
- Time zone: UTC+01:00 (CET)
  - Summer (DST): UTC+02:00 (CEST)
- INSEE/Postal code: 72001 /72650
- ^{1} French Land Register data, which excludes lakes, ponds, glaciers > 1 km^{2} (0.386 sq mi or 247 acres) and river estuaries.

Aigné (French pronunciation: [ɛɲe]) is a commune in the Sarthe department in the region of Pays de la Loire in north-western France.

== Population ==
Historical population
Year	Pop.	±% p.a.
1968	519	—
1975	646	+3.18%
1982	871	+4.36%
1990	1,155	+3.59%
1999	1,349	+1.74%
2007	1,528	+1.57%
2012	1,600	+0.93%
2017	1,659	+0.73%
2023	1,695	+0.36%
Source: INSEE

== See also ==
- Communes of the Sarthe department
