= Le Mans =

- Prefecture and commune
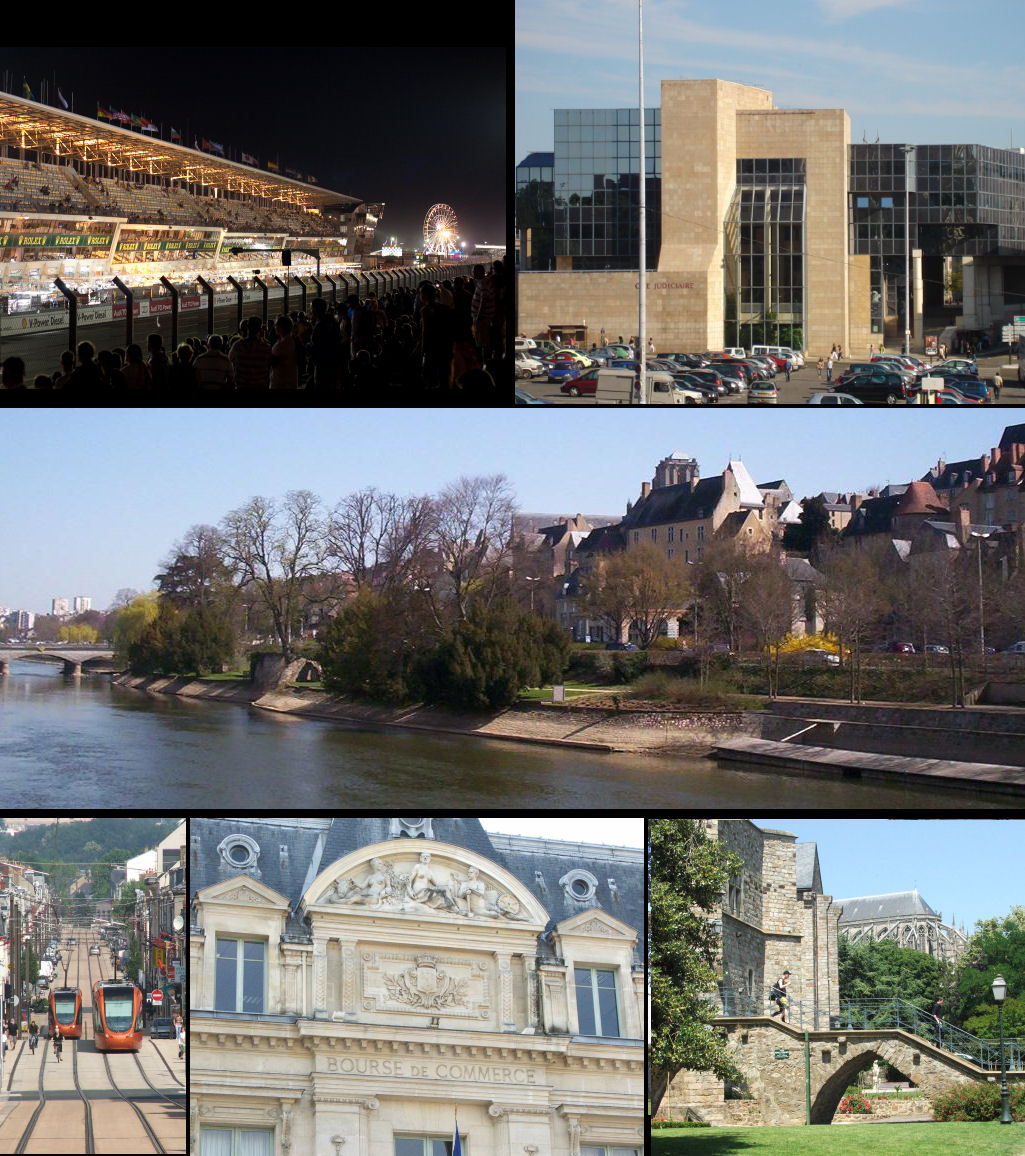
- Top, from left to right: 24 Hours of Le Mans automobile race at night; Le Mans Justice Department Office; Middle: View of Sarthe River and historic area, including the Palais of Comtes du Maine; Bottom, from left to right: Le Mans tramway in Gambetta Street; Facade of Le Mans Commerce Center; Saint Julien Cathedral

- Coat of arms
- Location of Le Mans
- Location within France Location within Pays de la Loire
- Coordinates: 48°00′28″N 0°11′54″E
- Country: France
- Region: Pays de la Loire
- Department: Sarthe
- Arrondissement: Le Mans
- Canton: Le Mans-1, 2, 3, 4, 5, 6 and 7
- Intercommunality: Le Mans Métropole

Government
  - Mayor (2026–32): Stéphane Le Foll
- Area^{1}: 52.81 km^{2} (20.39 sq mi)
- Elevation: 51 m (167 ft)
- Highest elevation: 134 m (440 ft)
- Lowest elevation: 38 m (125 ft)
- Population (2023): 146,249
  - Density: 2,769/km^{2} (7,173/sq mi)
- Demonym(s): Manceau (masculine); Mancelle (feminine)
- Time zone: UTC+01:00 (CET)
  - Summer (DST): UTC+02:00 (CEST)
- INSEE/Postal code: 72181 /72000
- Dialling codes: (0)243
- ^{1} French Land Register data, which excludes lakes, ponds, glaciers > 1 km^{2} (0.386 sq mi or 247 acres) and river estuaries.

Le Mans (/ləˈmɒ̃/; French: [lə mɑ̃]) is a city in northwestern France on the Sarthe River where it meets the Huisne. Traditionally the capital of the province of Maine, it is now the capital of the Sarthe department and the seat of the Roman Catholic diocese of Le Mans. Le Mans is a part of the Pays de la Loire region.

Its inhabitants are called Manceaux (male) and Mancelles (female). Since 1923, the city has hosted the 24 Hours of Le Mans, the world's oldest active endurance sports car race. The event is among the most attended and prestigious motor sports events in the world.

== History ==
First mentioned by Claudius Ptolemy, the Roman city Vindinium was the capital of the Aulerci, a sub tribe of the Aedui. Le Mans is also known as Civitas Cenomanorum (City of the Cenomani), or Cenomanus. Their city, seized by the Romans in 47 BC, was within the ancient Roman province of Gallia Lugdunensis. A 3rd-century amphitheatre is still visible. The thermae were demolished during the crisis of the third century when workers were mobilized to build the city's defensive walls. The ancient wall around Le Mans is one of the most complete circuits of Gallo-Roman city walls to survive.

As the use of the French language replaced late Vulgar Latin in the area, Cenomanus, with dissimilation, became known as Celmins. Cel- was taken to be a form of the French word for "this" and "that", and was replaced by le, which means "the".

As the principal city of Maine, Le Mans was the stage for struggles in the eleventh century between the counts of Anjou and the dukes of Normandy. When the Normans had control of Maine, William the Conqueror successfully invaded England and established an occupation. In 1069 the citizens of Maine revolted and expelled the Normans, resulting in Hugh V being proclaimed count of Maine. Geoffrey V of Anjou married Matilda of England in the cathedral. Their son Henry II Plantagenet, king of England, was born in the town.

In the 13th century Le Mans came under the control of the French crown. It was subsequently invaded by England during the Hundred Years' War.

Industrialization took place in the 19th century which saw the development of railway and motor vehicle production as well as textiles and tobacco manufacture.

Wilbur Wright began official public demonstrations of the airplane he had developed with his younger brother Orville on 8 August 1908, at the Hunaudières horse racing track near Le Mans.

=== World War II ===
Just outside Le Mans city centre there used to be an airfield, built to protect the Renault factory.

Soon after Le Mans was liberated by the U.S. 79th and 90th Infantry Divisions on 8 August 1944, engineers of the Ninth Air Force Engineering Command began construction of a combat Advanced Landing Ground on a location the Germans had used a simple airfield. The airfield was declared operational on 3 September and designated as "A-35". It was used by several American fighter and transport units in additional offensives across France; the airfield was closed in November 1944.

== Main sights ==
- Le Mans has a well-preserved old town (Cité Plantagenêt, also called Vieux Mans) and the Cathédrale St-Julien, dedicated to St Julian of Le Mans, who is honoured as the city's first bishop.
- Remnants of a Roman wall are visible in the old town and Roman baths are located by the river. These walls are highlighted every summer (July and August) evening in a light show that tells the history of the town.
- Arboretum de la Grand Prée
- Notre-Dame de la Couture, medieval church
- Notre Dame de Sainte Croix, neogothic church
- Part of the former Cistercian abbey de l'Epau, founded by Queen Berengaria and currently maintained in extensive grounds by the Département de la Sarthe.
- Jardin des Plantes du Mans
- Musée de la reine Bérengère, a museum of Le Mans history located in a gothic manor house.
- Musée de Tessé, the fine arts museum of the city, displaying painting (including artworks by Philippe de Champaigne, Charles Le Brun, François Boucher, John Constable, Ingres, Théodore Géricault and Camille Corot) and archaeological collections as well as decorative arts.
- The Hôtel de Ville (City Hall)

== Gallery ==
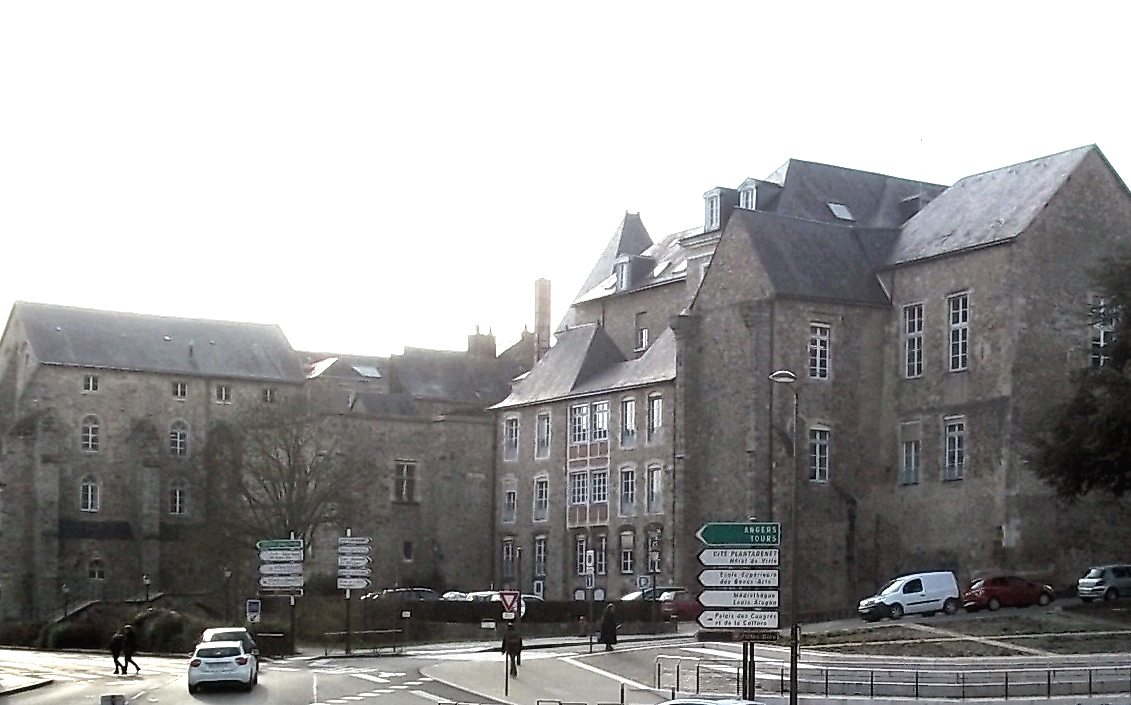
Le Palais des Comtes du Maine (Note: birthplace of Henry II of England (now part of the Hôtel de Ville (City Hall) and not open to the public))

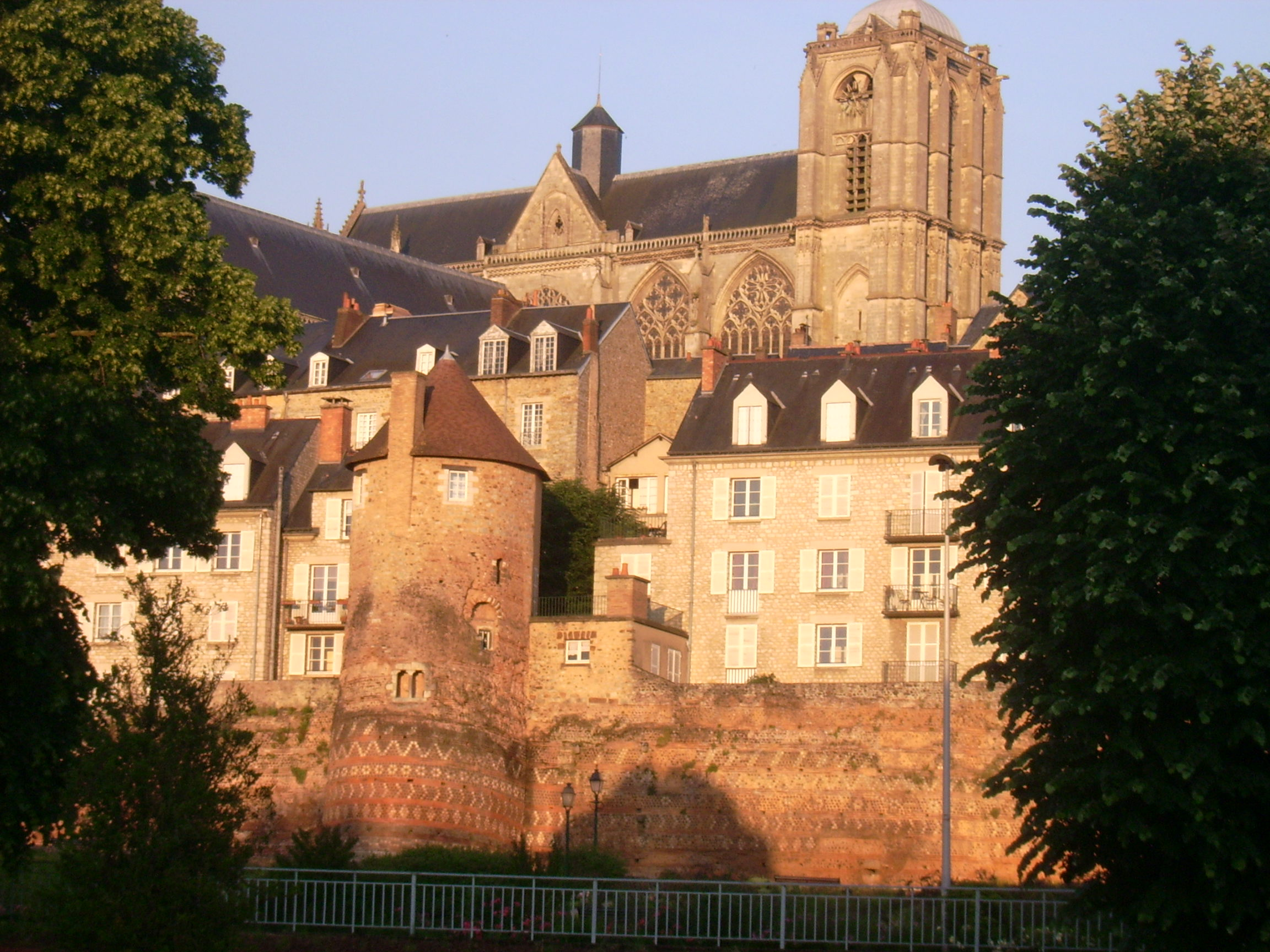
Gallo-Roman walls

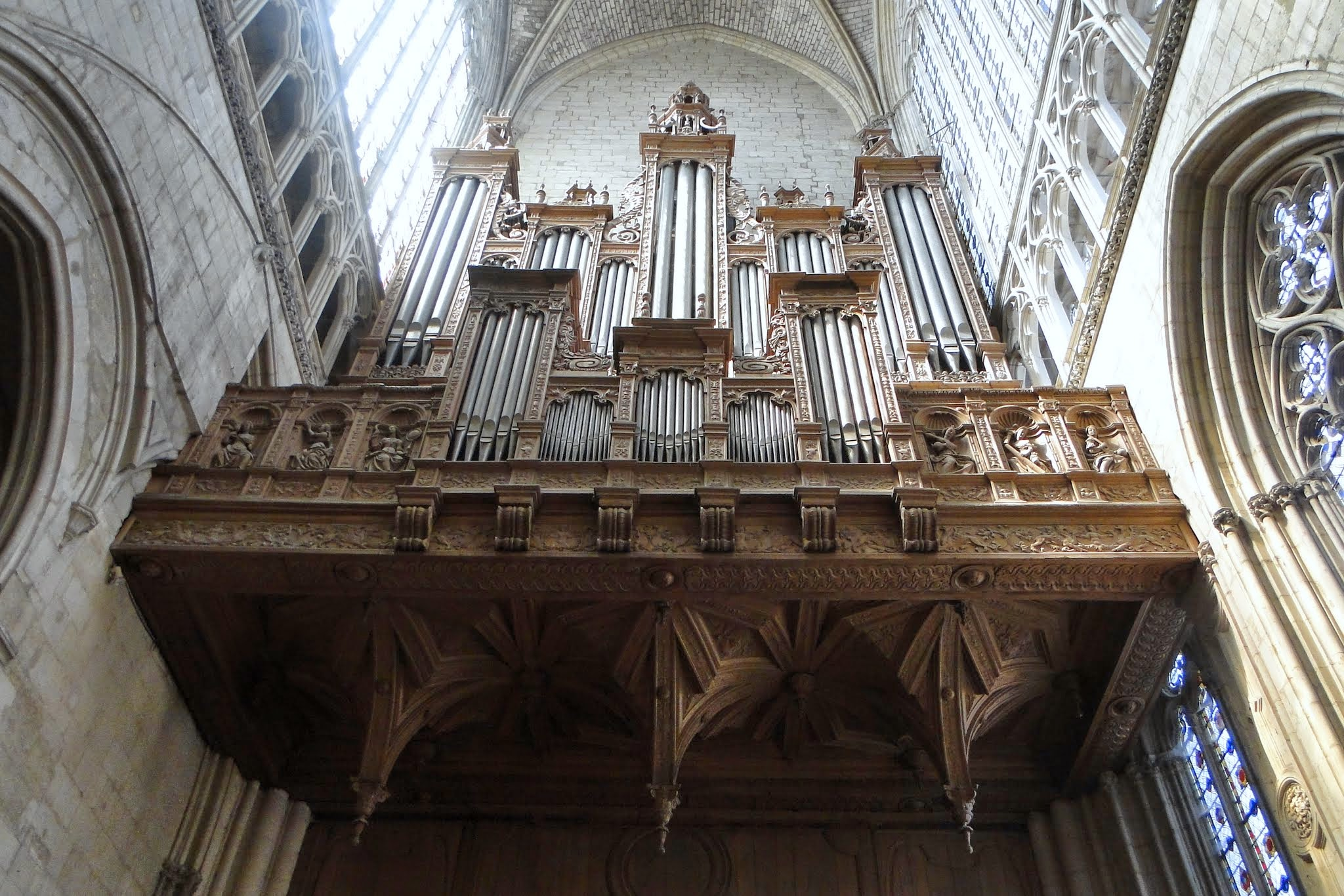
Organ in the cathedral

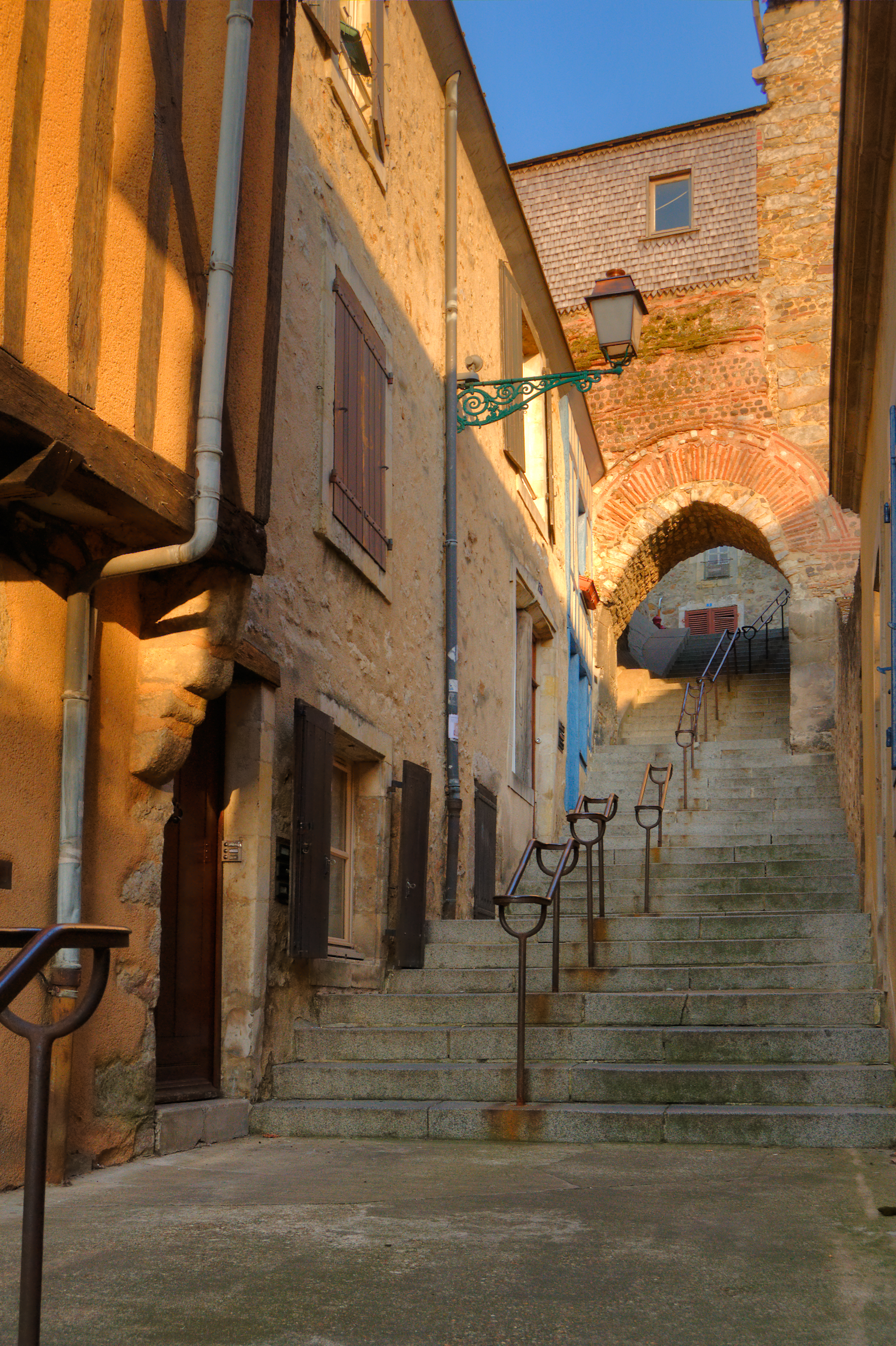
A street in the old town

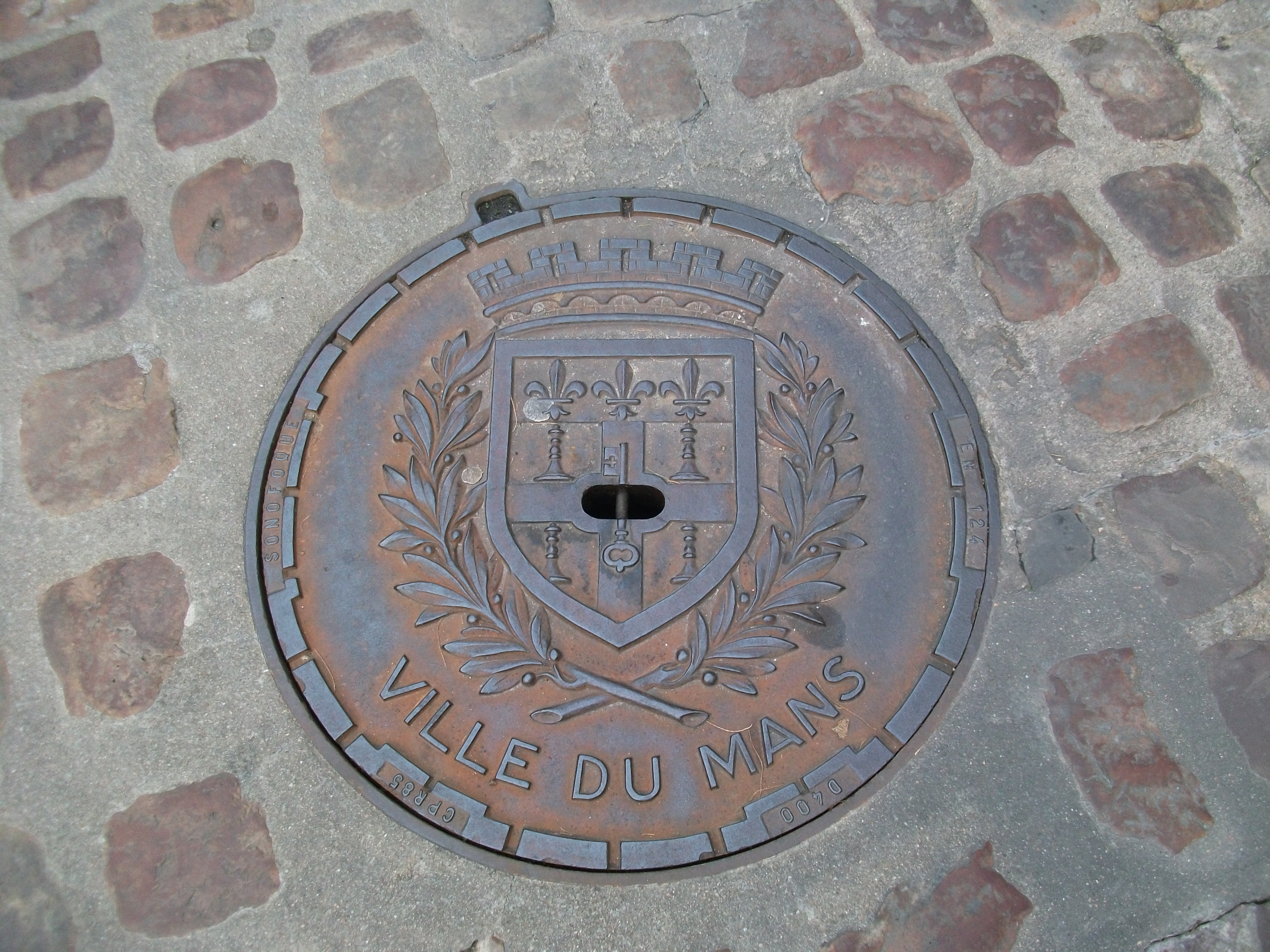
Manhole cover depicting the city's coat-of-arms

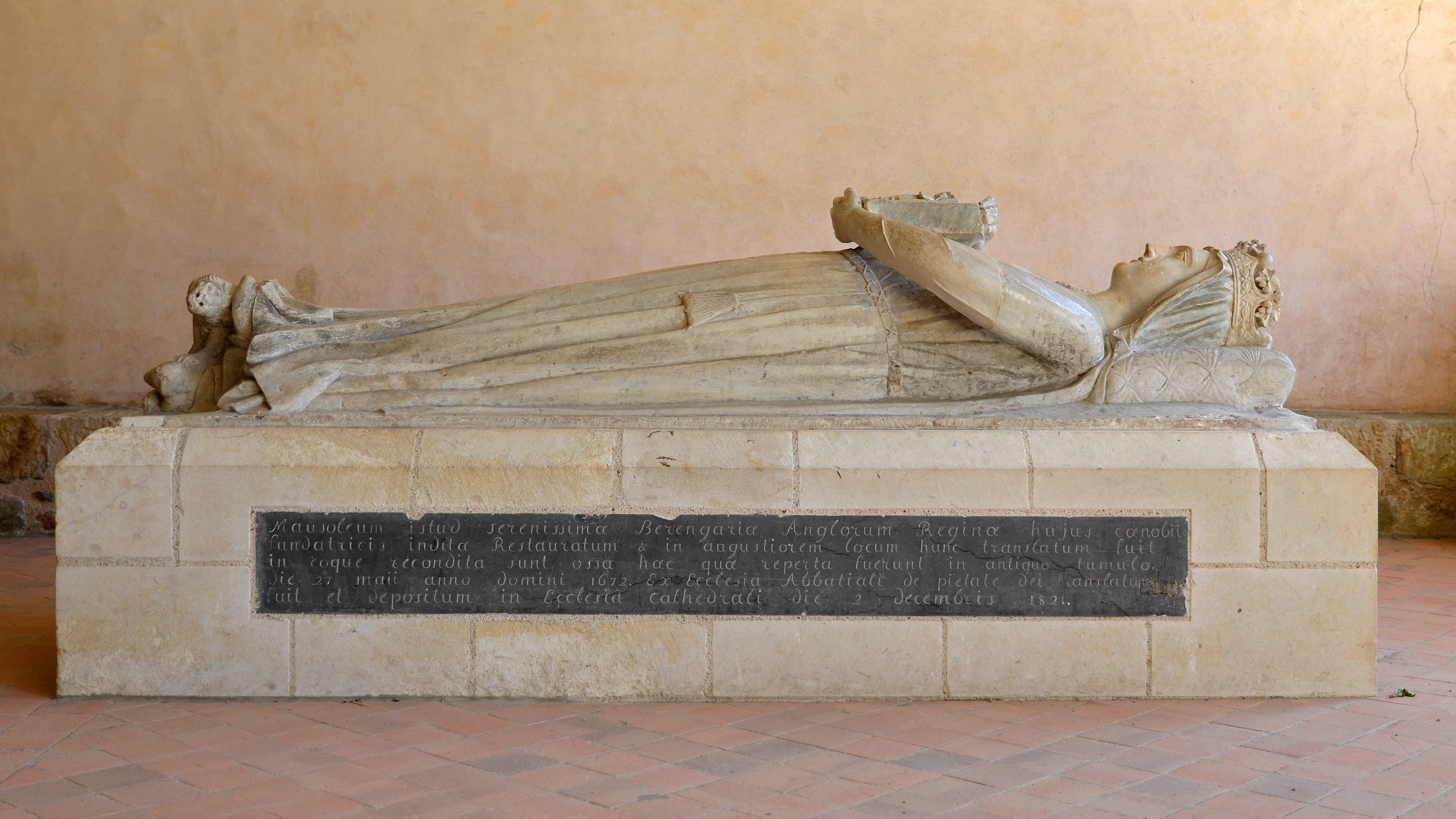
Effigy of Berengaria of Navarre in the chapter house of Épau abbey.

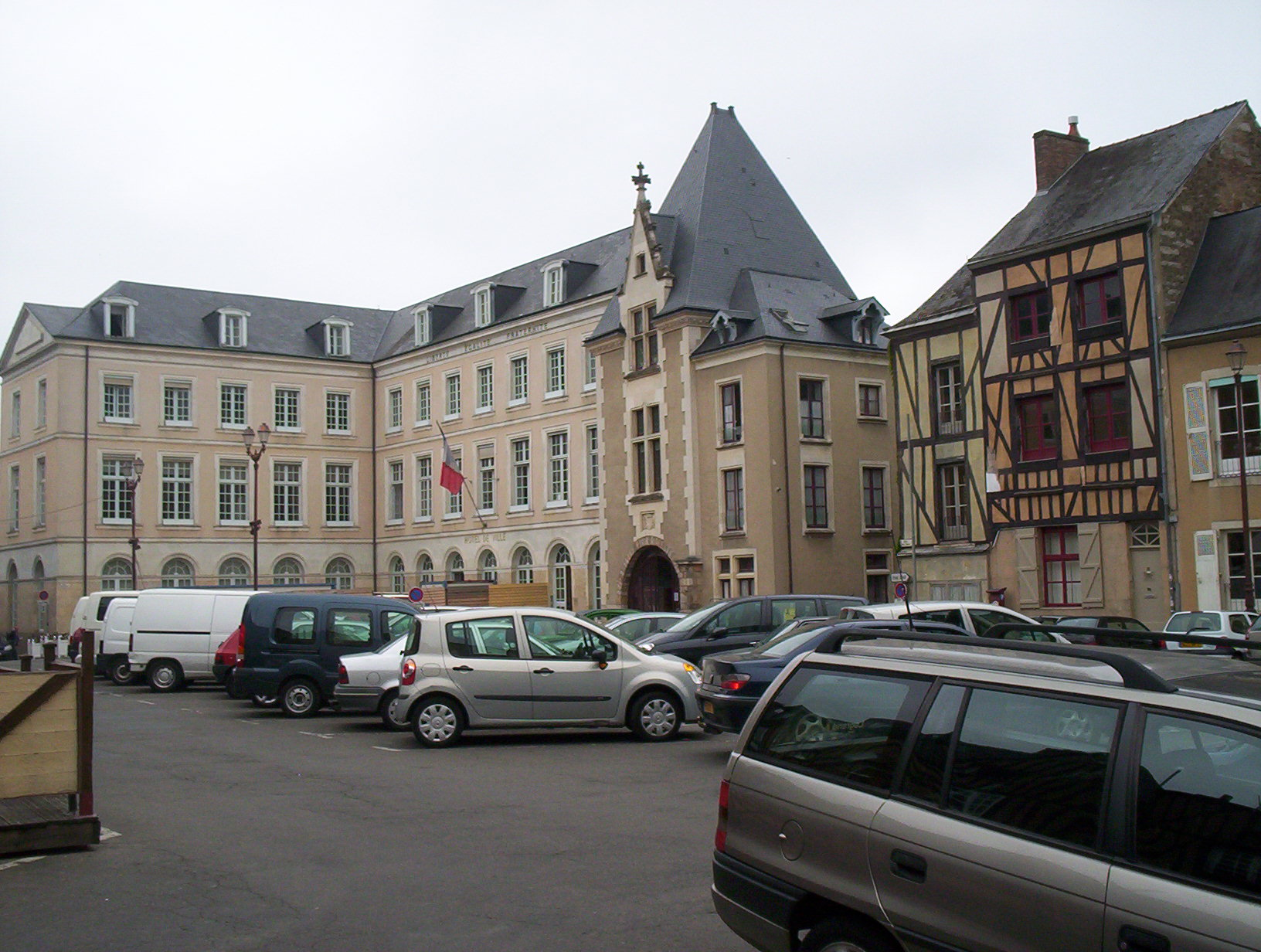
The Hôtel de Ville (City Hall)

== Climate ==
Le Mans has a temperate oceanic climate (Cfb) influenced by the mild Atlantic air travelling inland. Summers are warm and occasionally hot, whereas winters are mild and cloudy. Precipitation is relatively uniform and moderate year round.

Climate data for Le Mans (1991–2020 normals, extremes 1944-present)
Month	Jan	Feb	Mar	Apr	May	Jun	Jul	Aug	Sep	Oct	Nov	Dec	Year
Record high °C (°F)	17.2 (63.0)	21.8 (71.2)	25.6 (78.1)	30.3 (86.5)	32.6 (90.7)	41.4 (106.5)	41.1 (106.0)	40.5 (104.9)	35.0 (95.0)	30.1 (86.2)	22.2 (72.0)	18.3 (64.9)	41.1 (106.0)
Mean maximum °C (°F)	14.4 (57.9)	16.2 (61.2)	20.4 (68.7)	24.8 (76.6)	28.2 (82.8)	32.4 (90.3)	33.9 (93.0)	34.0 (93.2)	29.2 (84.6)	23.5 (74.3)	17.6 (63.7)	14.3 (57.7)	35.4 (95.7)
Mean daily maximum °C (°F)	8.4 (47.1)	9.7 (49.5)	13.3 (55.9)	16.6 (61.9)	20.1 (68.2)	23.6 (74.5)	26.0 (78.8)	26.0 (78.8)	22.2 (72.0)	17.2 (63.0)	11.9 (53.4)	8.8 (47.8)	17.0 (62.6)
Daily mean °C (°F)	5.5 (41.9)	5.9 (42.6)	8.7 (47.7)	11.3 (52.3)	14.9 (58.8)	18.2 (64.8)	20.3 (68.5)	20.1 (68.2)	16.7 (62.1)	13.0 (55.4)	8.6 (47.5)	5.9 (42.6)	12.4 (54.3)
Mean daily minimum °C (°F)	2.7 (36.9)	2.2 (36.0)	4.0 (39.2)	6.0 (42.8)	9.7 (49.5)	12.9 (55.2)	14.6 (58.3)	14.3 (57.7)	11.2 (52.2)	8.8 (47.8)	5.2 (41.4)	2.9 (37.2)	7.9 (46.2)
Mean minimum °C (°F)	−6.1 (21.0)	−5.1 (22.8)	−3.0 (26.6)	−0.6 (30.9)	2.7 (36.9)	6.8 (44.2)	8.8 (47.8)	7.7 (45.9)	4.5 (40.1)	0.8 (33.4)	−2.8 (27.0)	−5.2 (22.6)	−8.0 (17.6)
Record low °C (°F)	−18.2 (−0.8)	−17.0 (1.4)	−11.3 (11.7)	−4.9 (23.2)	−3.7 (25.3)	1.6 (34.9)	3.9 (39.0)	3.2 (37.8)	−0.5 (31.1)	−5.4 (22.3)	−12.0 (10.4)	−21.0 (−5.8)	−21.0 (−5.8)
Average precipitation mm (inches)	65.9 (2.59)	49.1 (1.93)	52.2 (2.06)	51.1 (2.01)	63.2 (2.49)	55.1 (2.17)	49.4 (1.94)	49.0 (1.93)	50.8 (2.00)	65.5 (2.58)	67.1 (2.64)	75.0 (2.95)	693.4 (27.30)
Average precipitation days (≥ 1.0 mm)	11.0	9.6	9.4	9.0	9.5	7.9	7.3	7.1	7.7	10.6	11.3	11.6	112.1
Average relative humidity (%)	87	83	78	74	75	73	72	74	79	86	88	88	79.8
Mean monthly sunshine hours	65.0	93.6	139.2	180.0	206.6	220.7	232.9	226.1	185.2	117.8	75.0	66.5	1,808.5
Source 1: Meteo France
Source 2: Infoclimat (humidity 1961–1990)

== Demographics ==
As of 2022, there were 370,280 inhabitants in the metropolitan area (aire d'attraction) of Le Mans, with 145,182 of these living in the city proper (commune). In 1855 Le Mans absorbed four neighbouring communes. The population data for 1851 and earlier in the table and graph below refer to the pre-1855 borders.

Historical population of Le Mans

Year	Pop.	±% p.a.
1793	18,855	—
1800	18,081	−0.60%
1806	19,030	+0.86%
1821	18,881	−0.05%
1831	19,792	+0.47%
1836	23,164	+3.20%
1841	25,189	+1.69%
1846	27,461	+1.74%
1851	27,059	−0.29%
1856	34,664	+5.08%
1861	37,209	+1.43%
1866	45,230	+3.98%
1872	46,981	+0.64%
1876	50,175	+1.66%
1881	55,347	+1.98%
1886	57,591	+0.80%
1891	57,412	−0.06%
1896	60,075	+0.91%
1901	63,272	+1.04%

Year	Pop.	±% p.a.
1906	65,467	+0.68%
1911	69,361	+1.16%
1921	71,783	+0.34%
1926	72,867	+0.30%
1931	76,868	+1.07%
1936	84,525	+1.92%
1946	100,455	+1.74%
1954	111,891	+1.36%
1962	132,181	+2.10%
1968	143,246	+1.35%
1975	152,285	+0.88%
1982	147,697	−0.44%
1990	145,502	−0.19%
1999	146,105	+0.05%
2007	144,164	−0.17%
2012	143,599	−0.08%
2017	142,946	−0.09%
2023	146,249	+0.38%

Source: EHESS and INSEE (1968–2023)

== Transportation ==
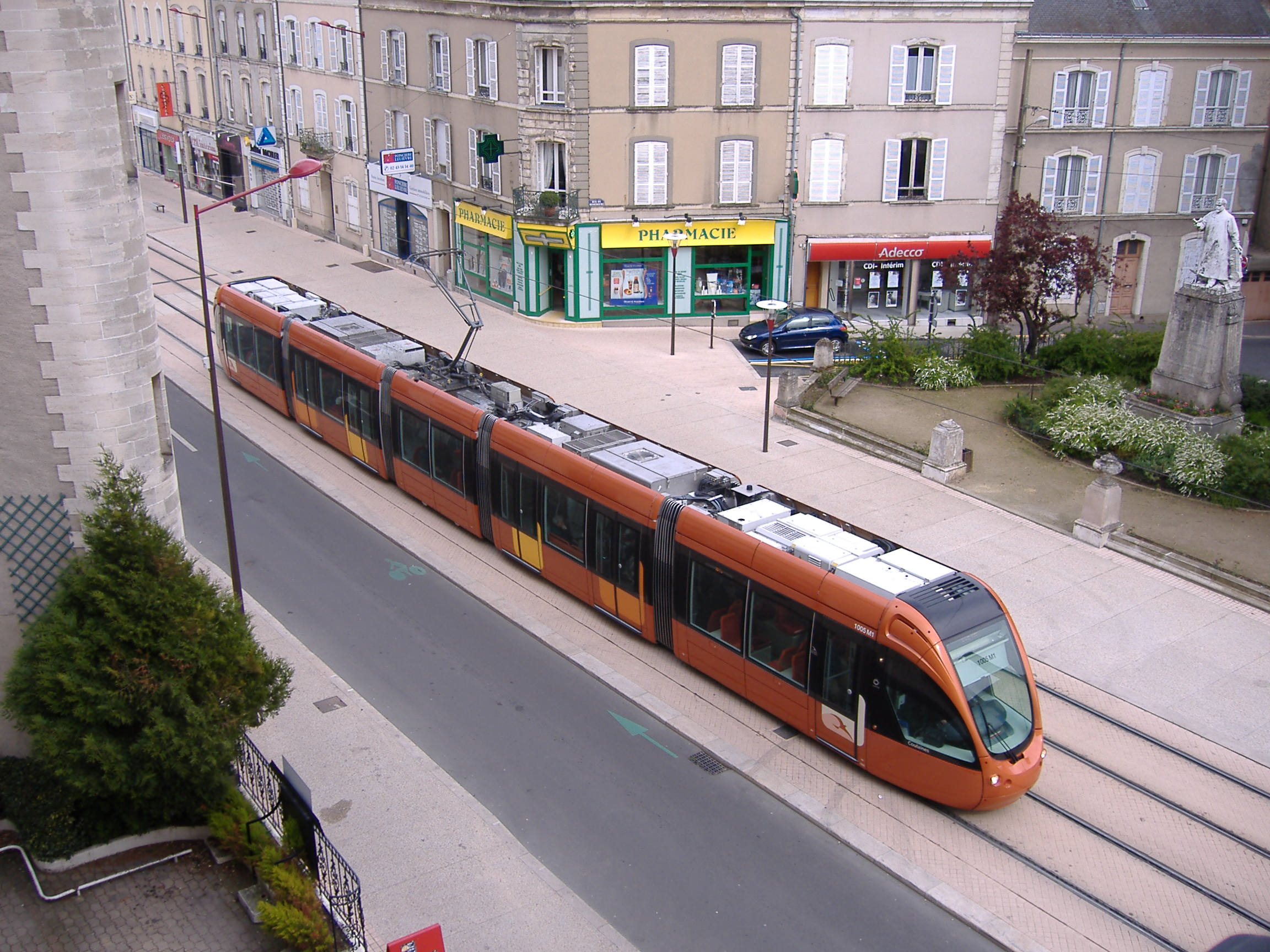
Tram in town center of Le Mans

The Gare du Mans is the main railway station of Le Mans. It takes 1 hour to reach Paris from Le Mans by TGV high speed train. There are also TGV connections to Lille, Marseille, Nantes, Rennes and Brest. Gare du Mans is also a hub for regional trains. Le Mans inaugurated a light rail system, Le Mans tramway (French: Tramway du Mans), on 17 November 2007.

The Le Mans Airfield (fr:Aéroport Le Mans-Arnage (LME LFRM, until 1971 Aérodrome des Raineries) located in the Arnage community to the south of the City serves as regional airport.

== Sport ==
=== Motorsport ===
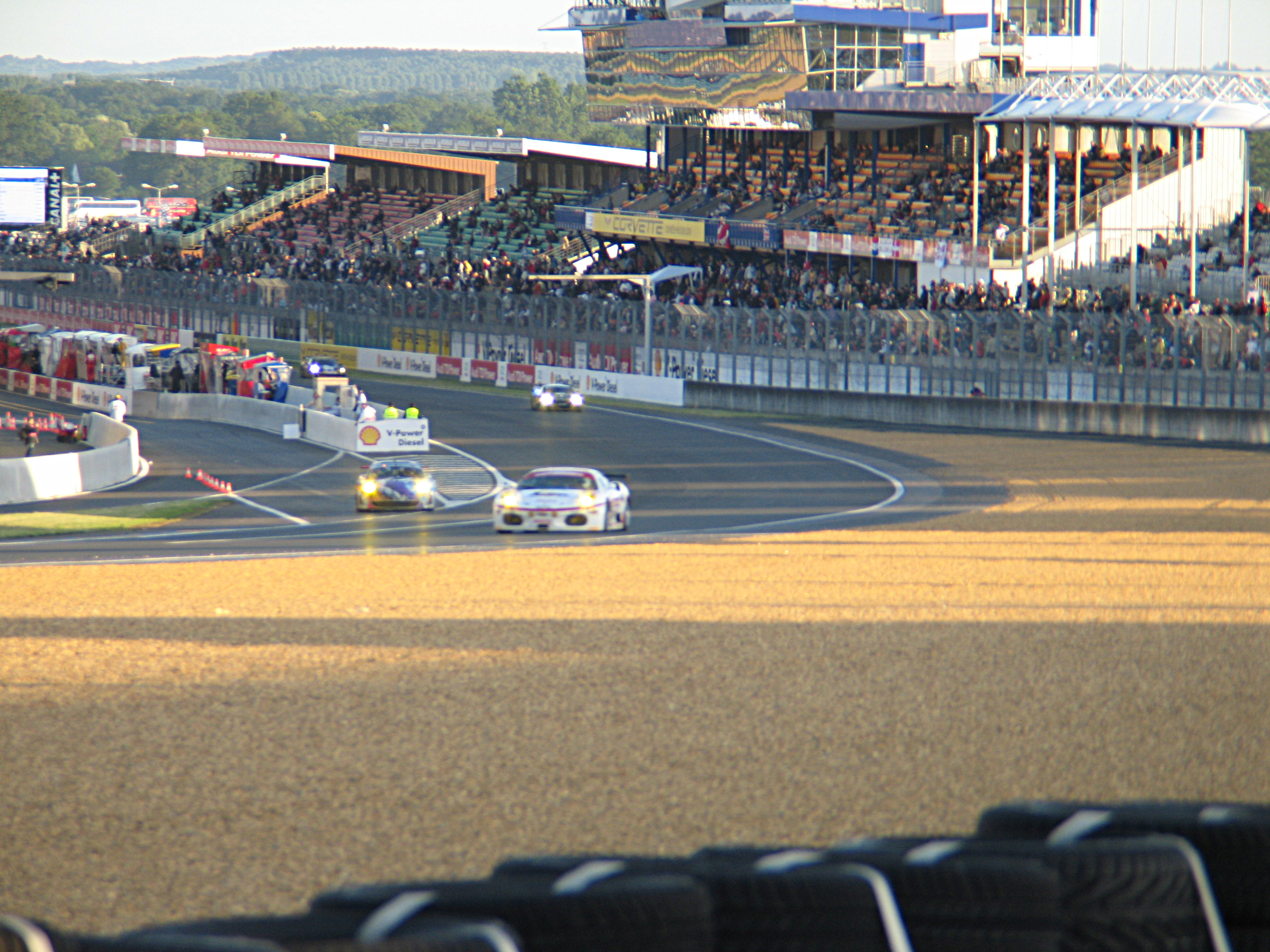
Dunlop Curve at the Circuit de la Sarthe

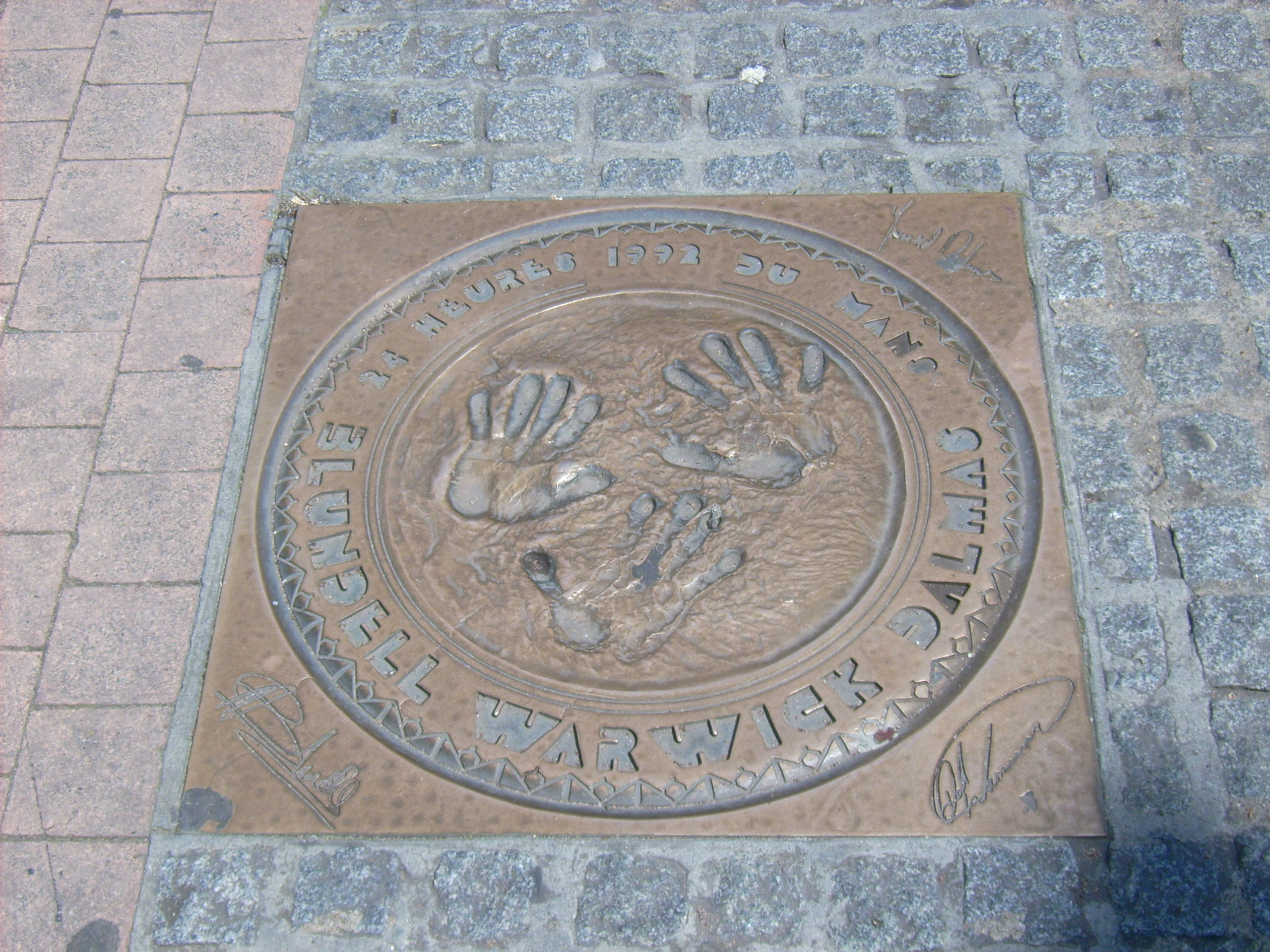
Handprints and signatures from the winners of the 1992 edition of the 24 Hours of Le Mans, Mark Blundell, Derek Warwick, and Yannick Dalmas, at Le Mans

The first French Grand Prix took place on a 64-mile (103 km) Circuit de la Sarthe based outside of Le Mans in 1906.

Since the introduction of the 24 Hours of Le Mans sports car endurance race in 1923, the city has been best known for its connection with motorsports. The Circuit des 24 Heures du Mans originally used public roads to the South of the city leading to Mulsanne. Some parts were replaced by permanent race track sections. The Bugatti Circuit (named after Ettore Bugatti, founder of the car company bearing his name), a relatively short permanent circuit without public roads, can be used for racing throughout the year and regularly hosts the French motorcycle Grand Prix.

The "Le Mans start" was used in the 24-hour race until 1969: drivers lined up across the track from their cars, ran across the track, jumped into their cars, started them, and began the race. The use of safety belts prevented this. The drivers have to be properly strapped in by mechanics.

The 1955 Le Mans disaster was a large accident during the race that killed eighty-four spectators.

=== Basketball ===
The city is home to Le Mans Sarthe Basket, 2006 Champion of the LNB Pro A, France's top professional basketball division.

The team plays its home games at the Antarès, which served as one of the host arenas of the FIBA EuroBasket 1999.

=== Football ===
- Le Mans FC

=== Cycling ===
- Circuit de la Sarthe (cycling)

== Notable people ==
Le Mans was the birthplace of:

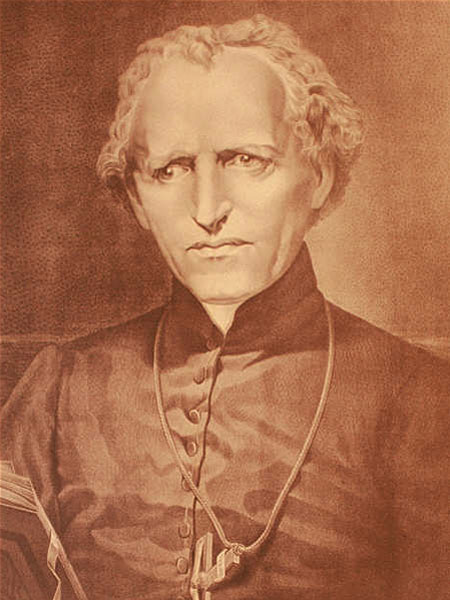
Basil Moreau around 1860

- Elijah ben Menahem Ha-Zaken, born 980
- Henry II of England, born 1133
- Geoffroy V d'Anjou, born 1113
- Geoffrey de Goreham or Gorron, became Abbot of St Albans, Hertfordshire, UK in 1119
- John II of France, born 1319
- Dom Louis Le Pelletier, born 1663, linguist of the Breton language
- Gilles-François de Beauvais, born 7 July 1693, Jesuit writer and preacher
- Jean-Marie-Joseph Coutelle (1748–1835), engineer, scientist and pioneer of ballooning
- Basil Moreau, born 1799, priest of Le Mans, founded the Congregation of Holy Cross, beatified in Le Mans in 2007
- Léon Bollée, born 1870, car manufacturer and inventor
- Henri Fournier, born 1871, racing driver
- Christine and Lea Papin, whose murder (1933) of their employers inspired Jean Genêt's The Maids
- Jean Françaix, born in 1912, composer
- Jean Lucas, born 1917, racing driver
- Anny-Charlotte Verney, born 1943, racing driver
- François Migault, born 1944, racing driver
- Jean Rondeau, born in 1946, racing driver and constructor
- Gérard Tremblay, born 1950, racing driver
- Jean-Yves Empereur born 1952, archeologist
- Bertrand Lançon, born 1952, Roman history scholar
- François Fillon, born in 1954, former Prime Minister of France
- Yves Jumeau, born in 1955, visual artist
- François Vallejo, born 1960, novelist
- Sylvie Tolmont, born 1962, politician
- Lionel Robert, born 1962, racing driver
- Sabine Toutain, born in 1966, violist
- Doan Bui, born in the 1970s, journalist
- Amaelle Landais-Israël, born 1977, climatologist
- Emmanuel Moire, born 1979, French singer
- Sébastien Bourdais, born 1979, race car driver
- Julien Canal, born 1982, race car driver
- Jo-Wilfried Tsonga, born 1985, professional tennis player
- Guillaume Loriot, born 1986, footballer
- Leslie, born 4 February 1985, French singer
- Louis Rossi born 1989, Grand Prix motorcycle racer
- Emma Mackey, born 1996, French-British actress

Notable residents include:

- Gilles Villeneuve, lived temporarily in Le Mans in 1973.
- Gérard Genette, literary theorist, lived and taught in Le Mans from 1956 to 1963.
- Jacques Derrida, philosopher, lived and taught in Le Mans in 1959–1960.
- David Jason, English actor, lived in Le Mans between 1965–1968 and 1999–2001.
- Andy Wallace, born 1961, racecar driver.

Died in Le Mans:

- Liborius of Le Mans (c. 348–397), bishop of Le Mans
- André d'Arbelles (1767–1825), journalist and historiographer
- Lawrence Aubrey Wallace (1857–1942), British Colonial Administrator
- Gojko Nikoliš (1911–1995), Yugoslavian physician, historian and general

== International relations ==
Le Mans is twinned with:

- Bolton, England, United Kingdom
- Haouza, Morocco
- Paderborn, Germany (officially since 1967, traditionally since 836, the oldest partnership of its kind)
- Rostov-on-Don, Russia
- Suzuka, Japan
- Volos, Greece
- Xianyang, China
- Indianapolis, Indiana, United States

== Gastronomy ==
The culinary specialty of Le Mans is rillettes, a shredded pork pâté.

== Landmarks ==
Located at Mayet near Le Mans, the Le Mans-Mayet transmitter has a height of 342 m and is one of the tallest radio masts in France.

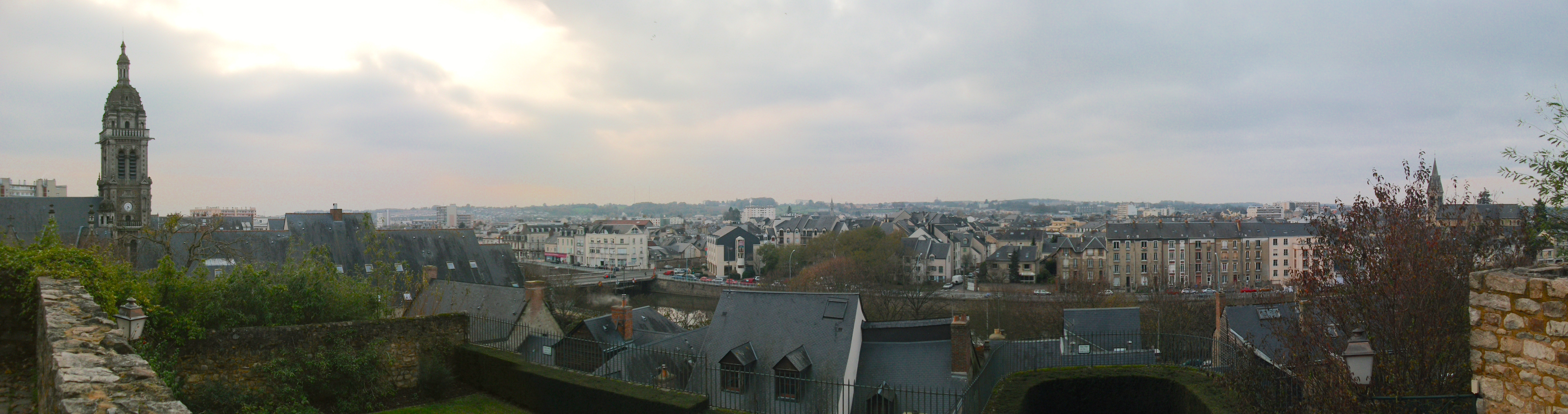
Panorama of Le Mans, facing north-west

== Representation in popular culture ==
- Le Mans has been a setting for numerous feature films that feature its famous race.
- Le Mans is a setting for sections of the 2020 novel, The Invisible Life of Addie LaRue, by V.E. Schwab.

== See also ==
- The Cenomanian Age of the Cretaceous Period of geological time is named for Cenomanus (Gallo-Roman Le Mans)
- Communes of the Sarthe department
- Gallo-Roman enclosure of Le Mans
- Museum of Archaeology and History of Le Mans
