= Hôtel de Ville, Le Mans =

Town hall in Le Mans, France

Hôtel de Ville
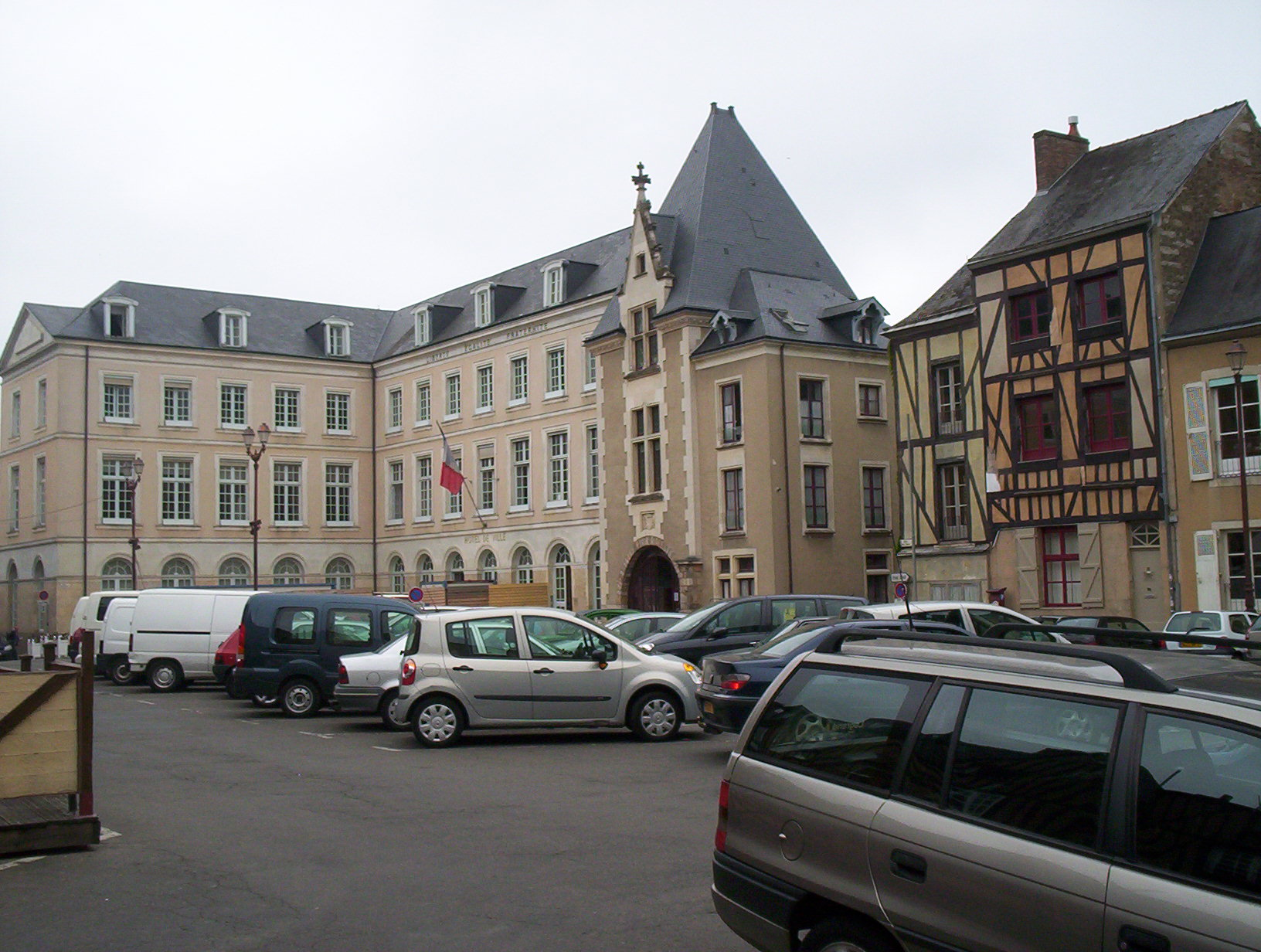
- The main frontage of the Hôtel de Ville in June 2007

General information
- Type: City hall
- Architectural style: Gothic style
- Location: Le Mans, France
- Coordinates: 48.0074°N 0.1973°E
- Completed: 1764

Monument historique
- Official name: Château des Comtes du Maine
- Type: Inscrit
- Designated: 1930
- Reference no.: PA00109801

The Hôtel de Ville (French pronunciation: [otɛl də vil], City Hall) is a municipal building in Le Mans, Sarthe, northwest France, standing on the Place Saint-Pierre. It was designated a monument historique by the French government in 1930.

== History ==
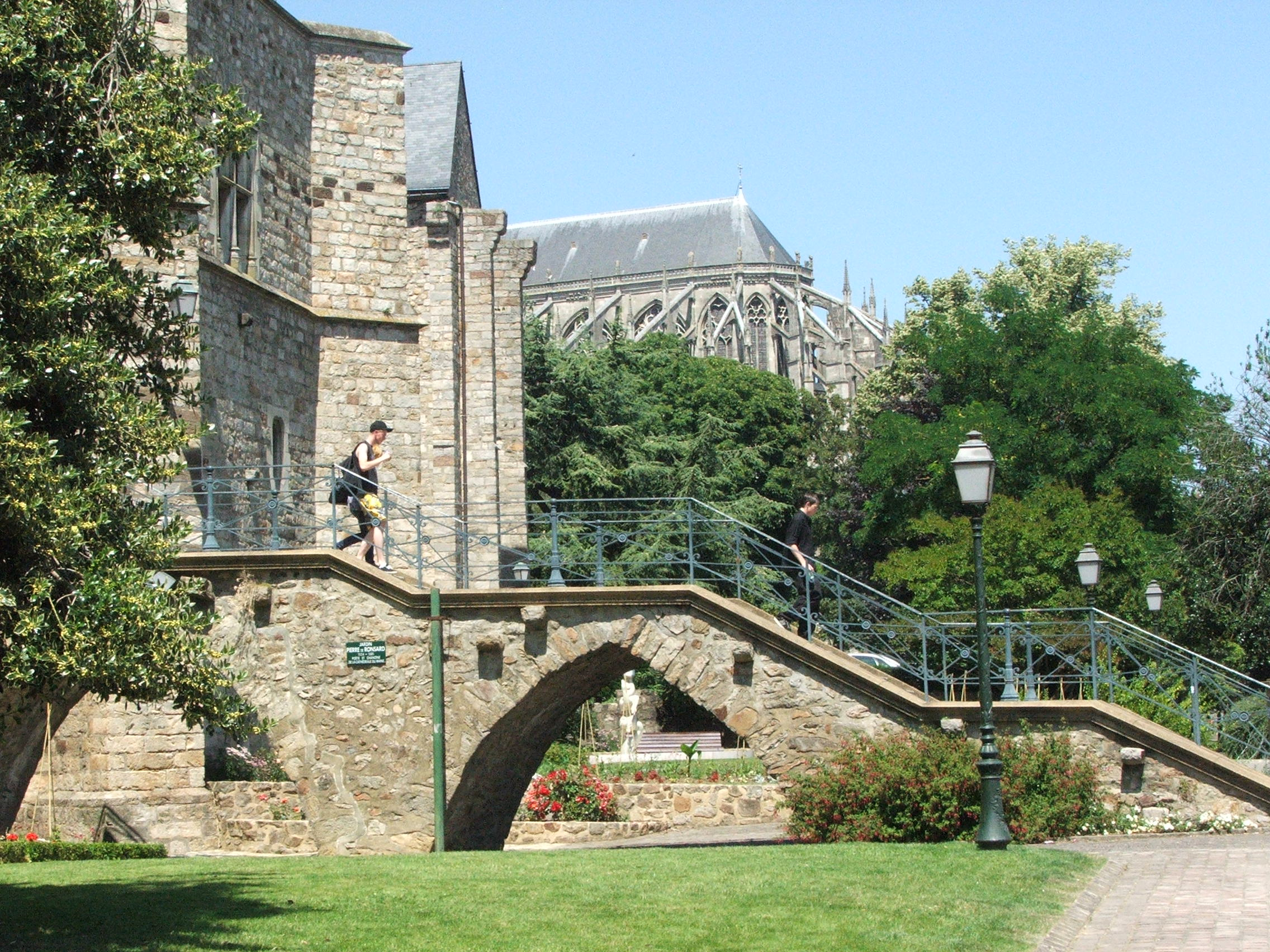
The Tour du Gros-Pilier, behind the Hôtel de Ville, is the main surviving part of the old palace

The complex has its origins in the Palais des Comtes du Maine (Palace of the Counts of Maine), the oldest part of which was the Grand Salle (Great Hall), commissioned by Hugh V, Count of Maine in the 11th century. Later additions included the Tour de la Roche in the 13th century and the Tour du Gros-Pilier in the 14th century.

Henry II, whose parents were Geoffrey Plantagenet, Count of Anjou and the Empress Matilda, was born in the palace on 5 March 1133 and went on to become King of England on 19 December 1154. Later, Berengaria of Navarre, who became consort of King Richard I of England in 1191, lived in the place until her death in 1230.

In 1471, Charles IV, Count of Maine offered one of the city gates, the Porte de la Cigogne, to the city council as a meeting place. However, the Porte de la Cigogne was in poor condition and, in 1529, Francis I offered part of the palace complex to the city council for municipal use.

By the mid-18th century, the Grand Salle was very dilapidated, and the council decided to demolish it and replace it with a more robust structure. Construction work on the new building started in 1756. It was designed in the neoclassical style, built in stone with a cement render and was completed in 1764. The design involved a seven-bay block adjacent to the Place Saint-Pierre (on the site of the Grand Salle) with a five-bay block projecting to the northwest. The three storey building was fenestrated with round headed windows on the ground floor and casement windows with window sills on the upper floors. Following the French Revolution the city council took over the whole complex.

A three-storey entrance tower, designed in the Gothic Revival style, was added at the southwest end of the complex in 1930. This featured a wide round headed opening on the ground floor, cross-windows on the first and second floors and a small square shaped window in the gable above. There was a pyramid-shaped roof behind the gable.

Following the liberation of the town on 6 August 1944, a plaque was unveiled in the forecourt to commemorate the lives of the five elected members of the council, including the mayor, Henri Lefeuvre, who died while serving with the French Resistance during the Second World War. An improved reception area within the entrance tower was officially opened by the mayor, Stéphane Le Foll, in November 2019. During this work, a section of the Roman wall beneath the building, was exposed and covered with a plate of glass so that it could be viewed by tourists.
