= Canton of Le Mans-4 =

Coordinates: 48.01°N 0.22°E

The canton of Le Mans-4 is an administrative division of the Sarthe department, northwestern France. It was created at the French canton reorganisation which came into effect in March 2015. Its seat is in Le Mans.

It consists of the following communes:

1. Coulaines
2. Le Mans (partly)
