= Arnage, Sarthe =

Arnage
- Commune
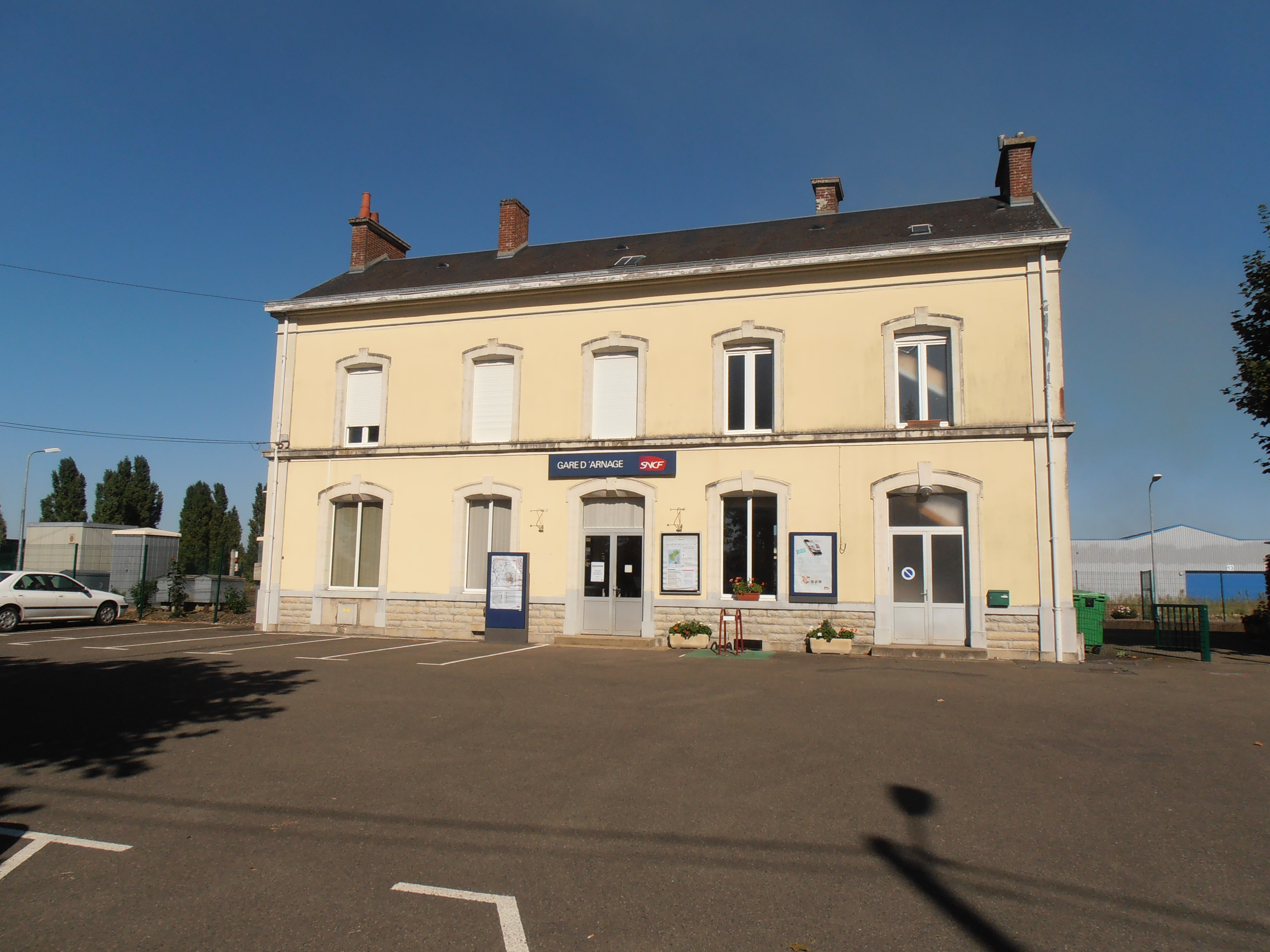
- The railway station

- Coat of arms
- Location of Arnage
- Location within France Location within Pays de la Loire
- Coordinates: 47°55′34″N 0°11′16″E
- Country: France
- Region: Pays de la Loire
- Department: Sarthe
- Arrondissement: Le Mans
- Canton: Le Mans-6
- Intercommunality: Le Mans Métropole

Government
  - Mayor (2020–2026): Eve Sans
- Area^{1}: 10.76 km^{2} (4.15 sq mi)
- Highest elevation: 56 m (184 ft)
- Lowest elevation: 38 m (125 ft)
- Population (2023): 5,445
  - Density: 506.0/km^{2} (1,311/sq mi)
- Demonym(s): Arnageois, Arnageoise
- Time zone: UTC+01:00 (CET)
  - Summer (DST): UTC+02:00 (CEST)
- INSEE/Postal code: 72008 /72230
- ^{1} French Land Register data, which excludes lakes, ponds, glaciers > 1 km^{2} (0.386 sq mi or 247 acres) and river estuaries.

Arnage (French pronunciation: [aʁnaʒ]) is a commune in the Sarthe department in the administrative region of Pays de la Loire, north-western France.

== Population ==
Historical population
Year	Pop.	±% p.a.
1968	3,697	—
1975	5,004	+4.42%
1982	5,367	+1.01%
1990	5,600	+0.53%
1999	5,565	−0.07%
2007	5,177	−0.90%
2012	5,143	−0.13%
2017	5,311	+0.64%
2023	5,445	+0.42%
Source: INSEE

== Twin towns ==
Arnage is twinned with:

- Hude, Germany
- Kröpelin, Germany

== See also ==
- Communes of the Sarthe department
