= Jacques de Juigné =

French politician (1874–1951)

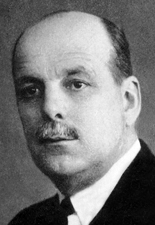
- Born: Jacques Auguste Marie Le Clerc de Juigné; 16 February 1874; Paris, France
- Died: 12 February 1951 (aged 76); Juigné-sur-Sarthe, Sarthe, France
- Occupation: Politician
- Title: Marquess
- Spouse: Madeleine Le Clerc de Juigné
- Relatives: Henri Schneider (father-in-law)

Jacques Auguste Marie Le Clerc, marquis de Juigné (16 February 1874 – 12 February 1951) was a French politician.

== Early life ==
Le Clerc de Juigné was born on 16 February 1874 in Paris, France.

== Career ==
He served as the mayor of Juigné-sur-Sarthe from 1900 to 1944.

He served as a member of the Chamber of Deputies from 1906 to 1936. He then served in the Senate from 1936 to 1941. On 10 July 1940, he voted as a Senator in favour of granting the cabinet presided by Marshal Philippe Pétain authority to draw up a new constitution, thereby effectively ending the French Third Republic and establishing Vichy France.

== Personal life ==
He married Marie Madeleine Schneider, the daughter of Henri Schneider. They resided at the Château de Juigné. He also inherited the Château du Bois-Rouaud in Chéméré, Loire-Atlantique, from his uncle.

== Death ==
He died on 12 February 1951.
