= Château du Bois-Rouaud =

Castle in France

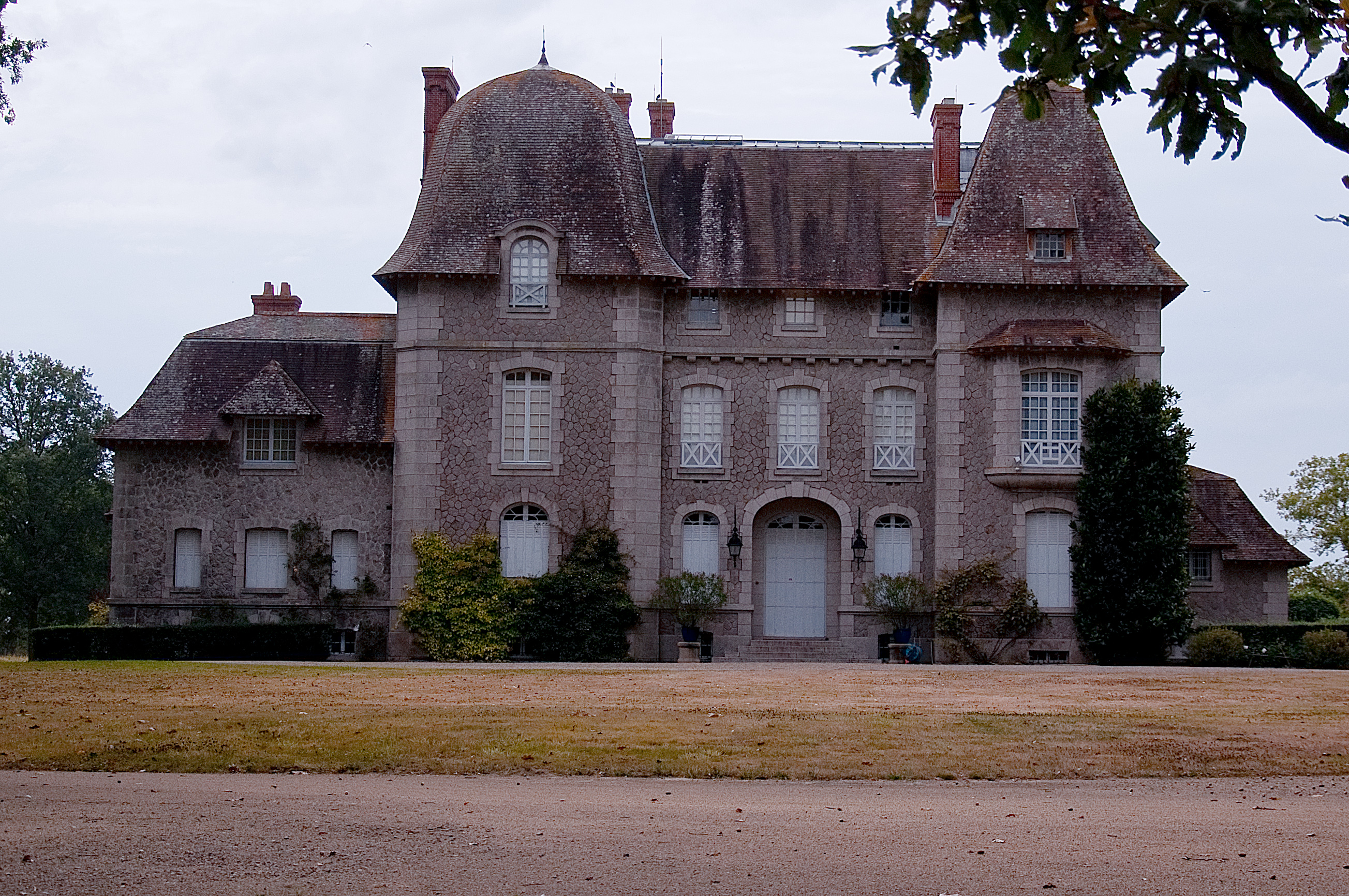

- Location within France

General information
- Coordinates: 47°6′58″N 1°51′27″W

The Château du Bois-Rouaud is a castle in Chéméré, Loire-Atlantique, France.

== History ==
It was built in 1905 to the design of architect Alfred Coulomb. The grounds were designed by Édouard André and his son, René Édouard André.

In 1912, the former dadoes of the Jockey-Club de Paris were moved to the drawing-room in this castle.

Marquess Jacques Le Clerc de Juigné, a politician, inherited this castle from his uncle, where he spent some time with his wife, Madeleine Le Clerc de Juigné, an heiress to the Schneider-Creusot fortune. However, they resided at the Château de Juigné in Juigné-sur-Sarthe.

== Architectural significance ==
It has been listed as an official historical monument by the French Ministry of Culture since 2001.
