= Neuvy =

Neuvy may refer to the following places in France:

- Neuvy, Allier, a commune in the department of Allier
- Neuvy, Loir-et-Cher, a commune in the department of Loir-et-Cher
- Neuvy, Marne, a commune in the department of Marne
- Neuvy-au-Houlme, a commune in the department of Orne
- Neuvy-Bouin, a commune in the department of Deux-Sèvres
- Neuvy-Deux-Clochers, a commune in the department of Cher
- Neuvy-en-Beauce, a commune in the department of Eure-et-Loir
- Neuvy-en-Champagne, a commune in the department of Sarthe
- Neuvy-en-Dunois, a commune in the department of Eure-et-Loir
- Neuvy-en-Mauges, a commune in the department of Maine-et-Loire
- Neuvy-en-Sullias, a commune in the department of Loiret
- Neuvy-Grandchamp, a commune in the department of Saône-et-Loire
- Neuvy-le-Barrois, a commune in the department of Cher
- Neuvy-le-Roi, a commune in the department of Indre-et-Loire
- Neuvy-Pailloux, a commune in the department of Indre
- Neuvy-Saint-Sépulchre, a commune in the department of Indre
- Neuvy-Sautour, a commune in the department of Yonne
- Neuvy-sur-Barangeon, a commune in the department of Cher
- Neuvy-sur-Loire, a commune in the department of Nièvre
