= Château de Juigné =

Castle in Pays de la Loire, France

- Interactive map of the Château de Juigné area

General information
- Coordinates: 47.8614°N 0.2849°W

The Château de Juigné is an historic castle in Juigné-sur-Sarthe, Sarthe, Pays de la Loire, France.

== History ==
The castle was built in the 17th century for the Le Clerc de Juigné family. In 1680, Jacques Le Clerc de Juigné left his Château de Verdelles in Poillé-sur-Vègre, also in Sarthe, for this new castle.

It was partly demolished in 1832, and subsequently rebuilt from 1918 to 1940.

In the first half of the 20th century, it was the private residence of Jacques Le Clerc de Juigné, a politician, and his wife, Madeleine Le Clerc de Juigné, an heiress to the Schneider-Creusot fortune.
