= Vègre =

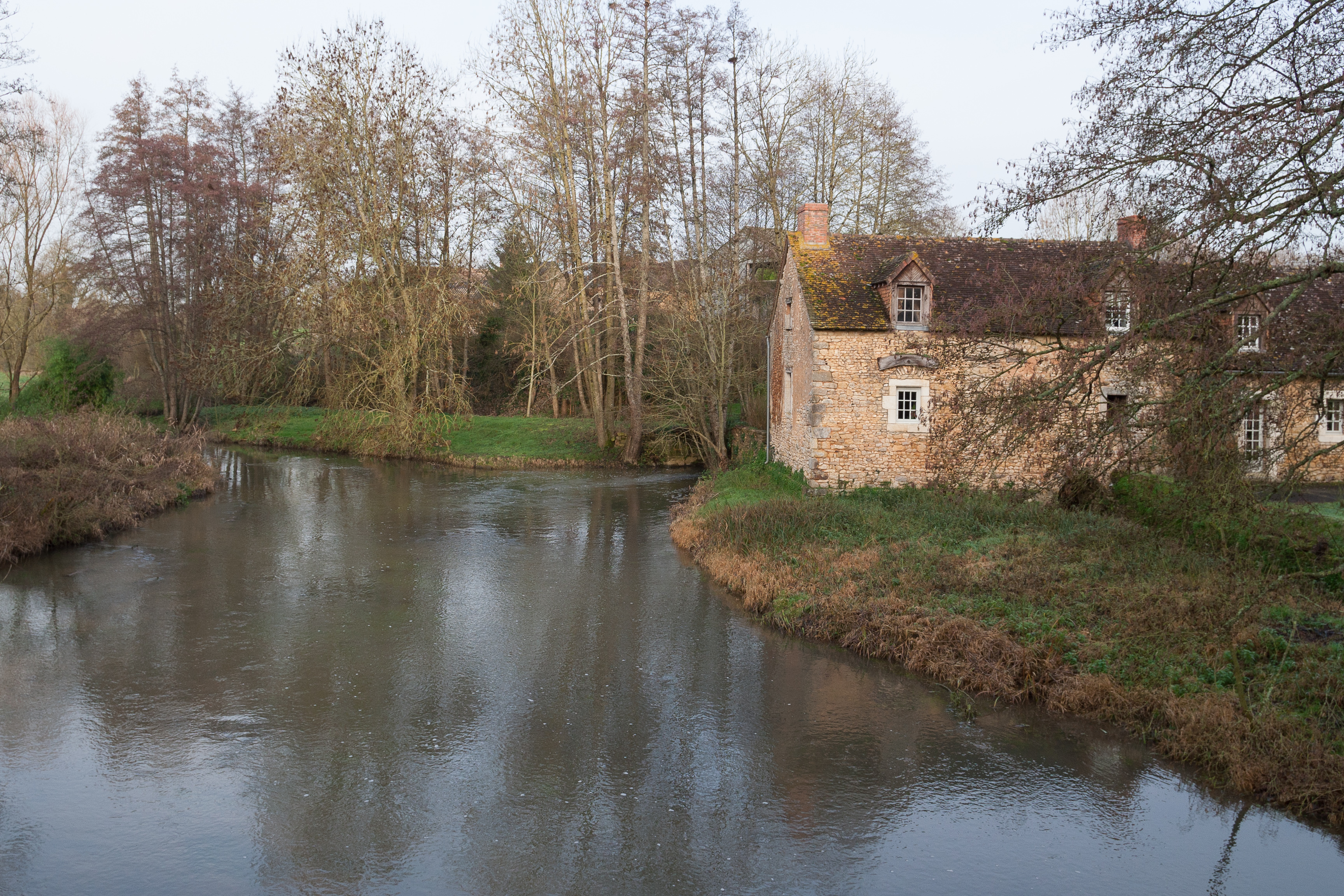
- The Vègre in Ruillé-en-Champagne

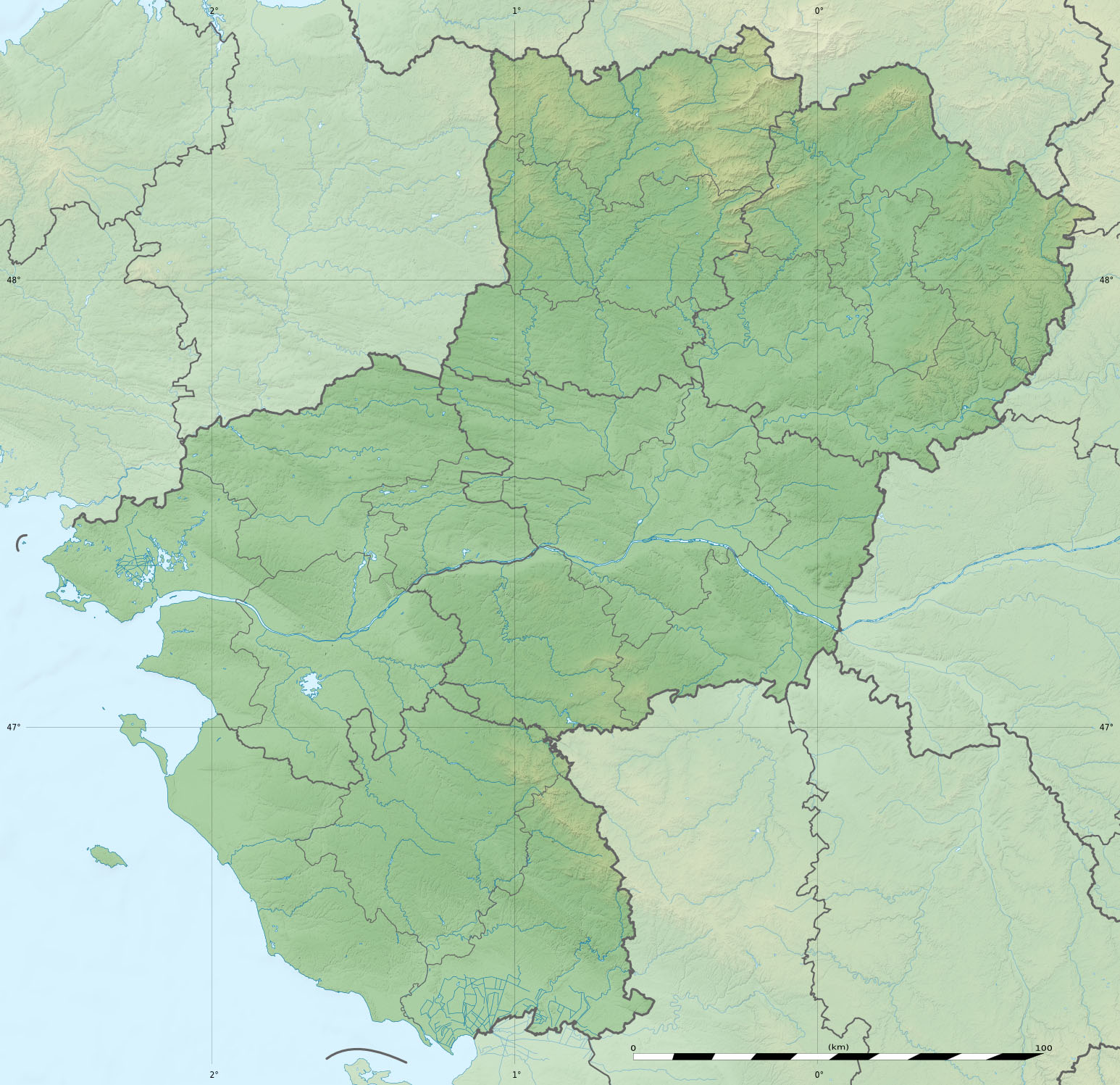
- Location within France Location within Pays de la Loire

Location
- Country: France

Physical characteristics
- Source
  - location: Rouessé-Vassé
  - coordinates: 48°09′04″N 00°14′33″W
  - elevation: 160 m (520 ft)
- Mouth
  - location: Sarthe
  - coordinates: 47°50′53″N 00°14′33″W
  - elevation: 27 m (89 ft)
- Length: 84.2 km (52.3 mi)
- Basin size: 401 km^{2} (155 sq mi)
- Discharge
  - average: 3.19 m^{3}/s (113 cu ft/s)

Basin features
- Progression: Sarthe→ Maine→ Loire→ Atlantic Ocean

The Vègre (French pronunciation: [vɛɡʁ]) is an 84.2 km (52.3 mi) long river in the Sarthe department in western France. Its source is near Rouessé-Vassé. It flows generally south. It is a right tributary of the Sarthe, into which it flows near Avoise.

== Communes along its course ==
This list is ordered from source to mouth: Rouessé-Vassé, Rouez-en-Champagne, Tennie, Neuvy-en-Champagne, Bernay-en-Champagne, Ruillé-en-Champagne, Épineu-le-Chevreuil, Chassillé, Loué, Mareil-en-Champagne, Brûlon, Saint-Ouen-en-Champagne, Chevillé, Avessé, Poillé-sur-Vègre, Fontenay-sur-Vègre, Asnières-sur-Vègre, Juigné-sur-Sarthe, Avoise.
