= Chevillé =

- Commune
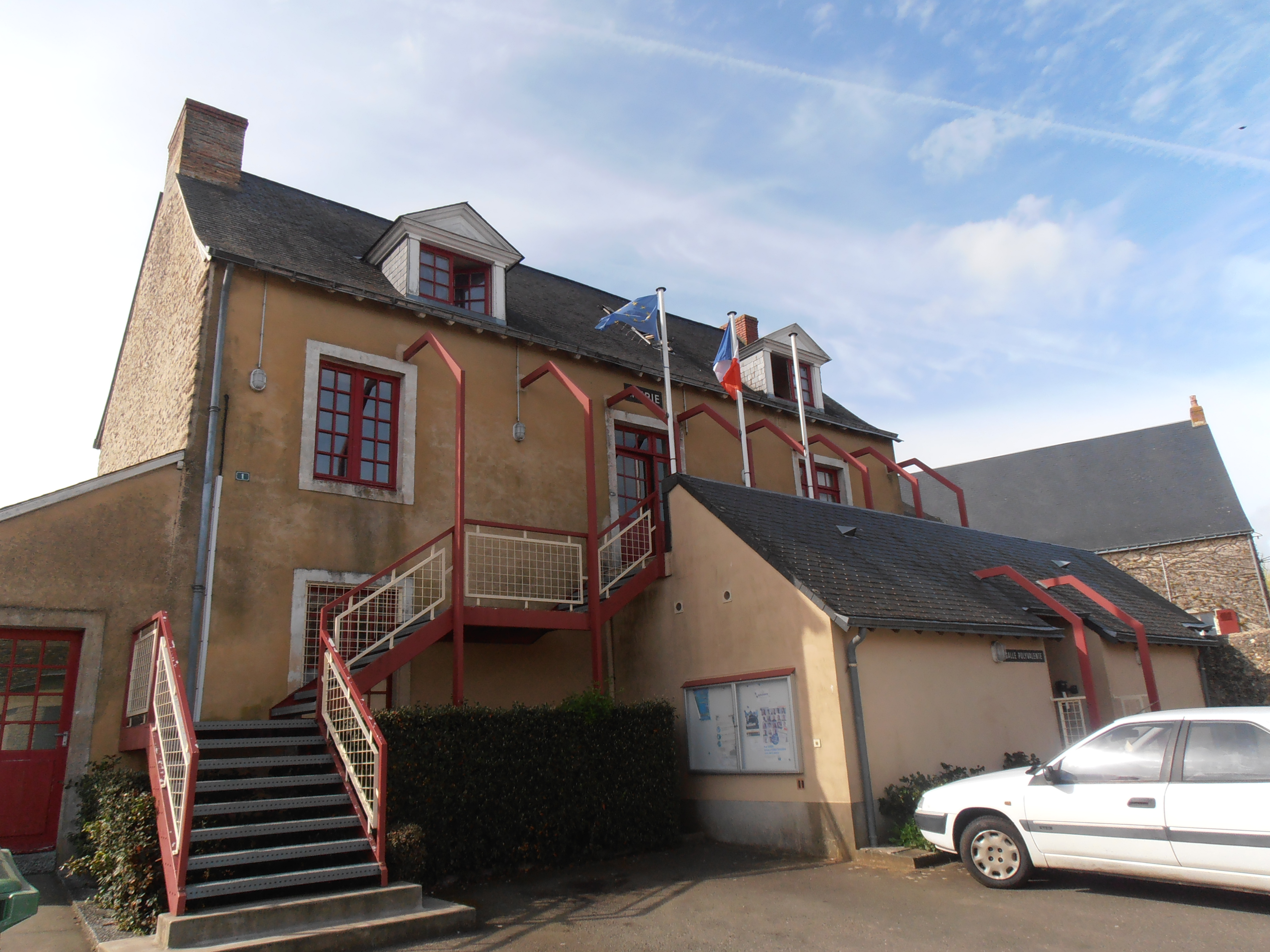
- The town hall of Chevillé

- Coat of arms
- Location of Chevillé
- Location within France Location within Pays de la Loire
- Coordinates: 47°56′55″N 0°13′21″W
- Country: France
- Region: Pays de la Loire
- Department: Sarthe
- Arrondissement: La Flèche
- Canton: Loué
- Intercommunality: Loué-Brûlon-Noyen

Government
  - Mayor (2020–2026): Guy Muller
- Area^{1}: 14.2 km^{2} (5.5 sq mi)
- Population (2023): 351
  - Density: 24.7/km^{2} (64.0/sq mi)
- Time zone: UTC+01:00 (CET)
  - Summer (DST): UTC+02:00 (CEST)
- INSEE/Postal code: 72083 /72350
- ^{1} French Land Register data, which excludes lakes, ponds, glaciers > 1 km^{2} (0.386 sq mi or 247 acres) and river estuaries.

Chevillé is a commune in the Sarthe department in the Pays de la Loire region in north-western France.

== Geography ==
The river Vègre forms all of the commune's western border.

== See also ==
- Communes of the Sarthe department
