= Château de Verdelles =

Castle in Sarthe, Pays de la Loire, France

Coordinates: 47.9003°N 0.2472°W

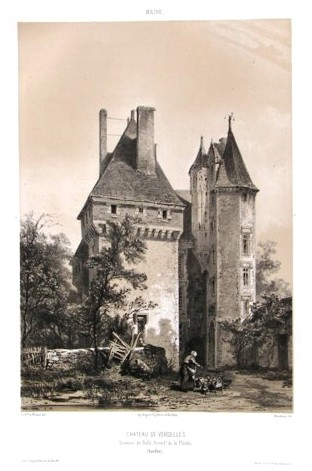
- Château de Verdelles in 1862
- Interactive map of the Château de Verdelles area

The Château de Verdelles is a historic castle in Poillé-sur-Vègre, Sarthe, Pays de la Loire, France.

== History ==
The castle was completed in 1490.

== Architectural significance ==
It has been listed as an official monument since 1922.
