= Manoir de Vrigné =

Historic manor

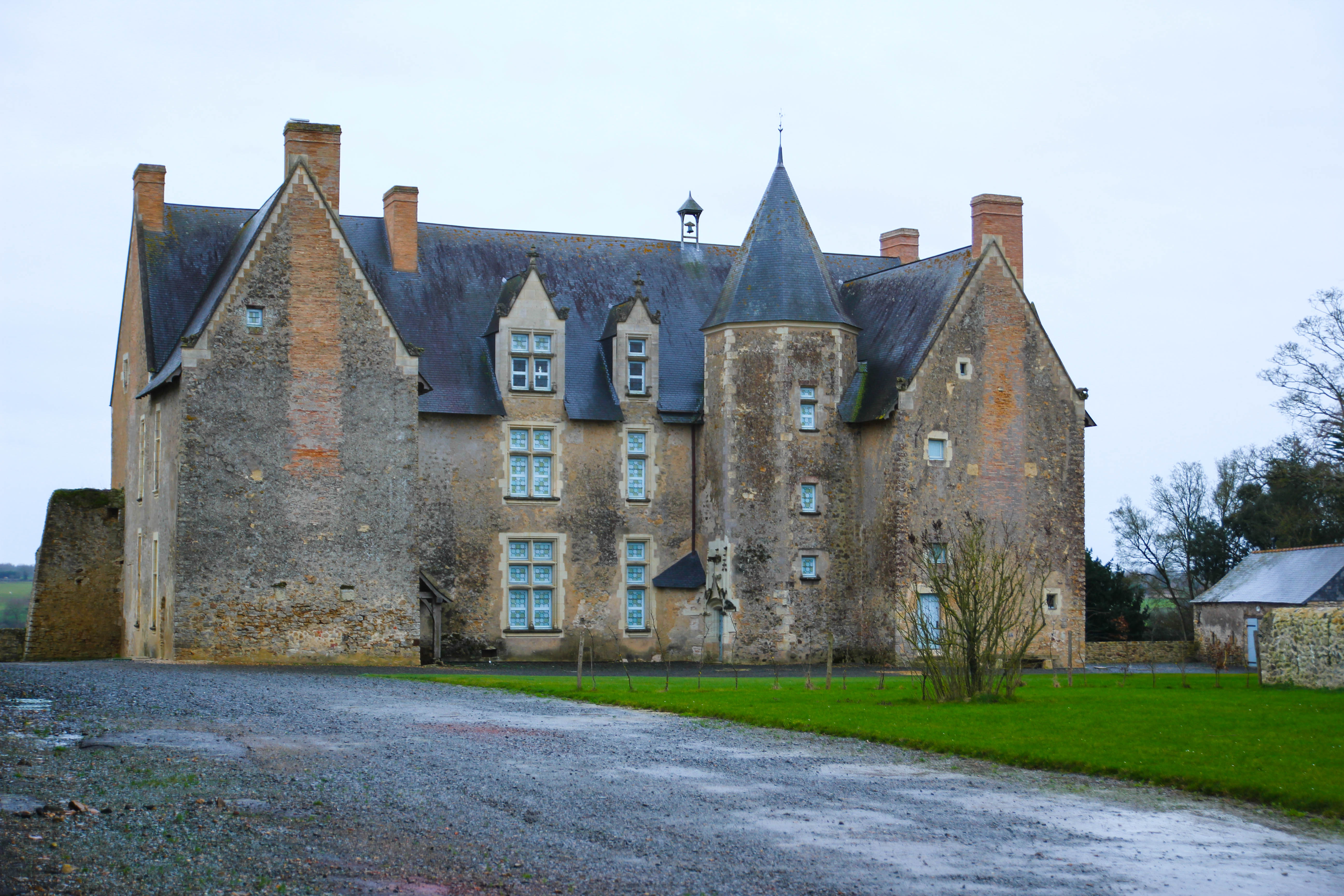

- Location within France

General information
- Coordinates: 47°51′38″N 0°16′22″W

The Manoir de Vrigné is a historic manor in Juigné-sur-Sarthe, Sarthe, France.

== History ==
The manor was built from 1493 to 1528 for Pierre Jarry, a member of the Court of Audit under King René of Anjou. It was acquired by Georges Le Clerc de Juigné in 1654.

It is owned by Jean de Durfort. He restored it from 1995 to 2012. In 2012, it was open to visitors during the European Heritage Days.

== Architectural significance ==
It has been listed as an official historical monument by the French Ministry of Culture since 1989.
