= Courtillers =

- Commune
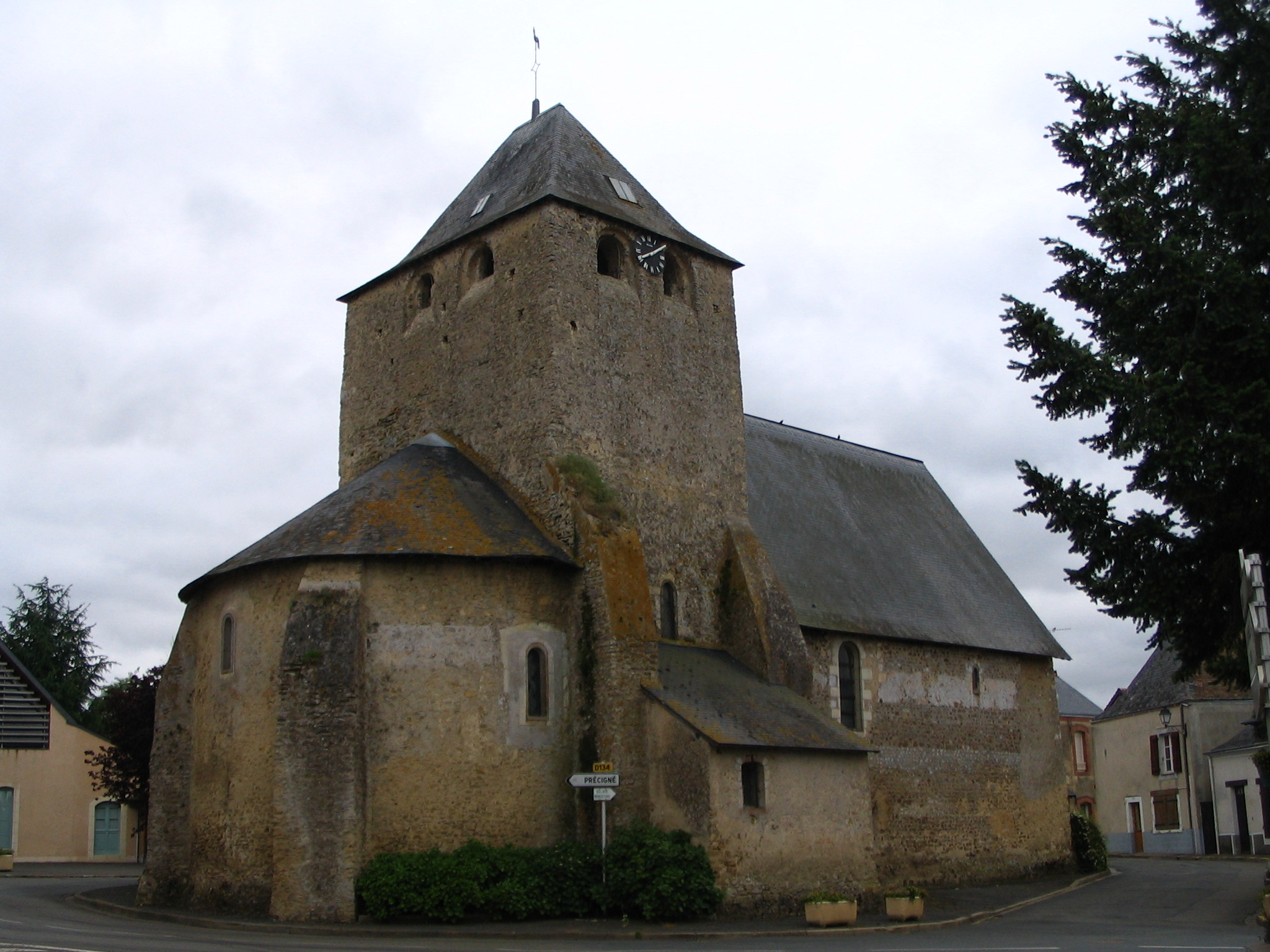
- The church of Saint Jean Baptiste
- Location of Courtillers
- Location within France Location within Pays de la Loire
- Coordinates: 47°48′00″N 0°18′00″W
- Country: France
- Region: Pays de la Loire
- Department: Sarthe
- Arrondissement: La Flèche
- Canton: Sablé-sur-Sarthe
- Intercommunality: CC Pays Sabolien

Government
  - Mayor (2020–2026): Dominique Leroy
- Area^{1}: 7.24 km^{2} (2.80 sq mi)
- Highest elevation: 55 m (180 ft)
- Lowest elevation: 34 m (112 ft)
- Population (2023): 901
  - Density: 124/km^{2} (322/sq mi)
- Demonym(s): Courtilléen, Courtilléenne
- Time zone: UTC+01:00 (CET)
  - Summer (DST): UTC+02:00 (CEST)
- INSEE/Postal code: 72106 /72300
- ^{1} French Land Register data, which excludes lakes, ponds, glaciers > 1 km^{2} (0.386 sq mi or 247 acres) and river estuaries.

Courtillers (French pronunciation: [kuʁtije]) is a commune in the Sarthe department in the Pays de la Loire region in north-western France.

== See also ==
- Communes of the Sarthe department
