= Colbert de Torcy (secondary school) =

School in Sable-sur-Sarthe, France

Colbert de Torcy is a secondary school in Sable-sur-Sarthe, France. As of 2006, it enrolled 1,500 students.

== Hostage crisis ==
On 9 March 2006 at 2:30 p.m., a 33-year-old former high school teacher in Sablé-sur-Sarthe, Sarthe, France, took 23 people, most of them students aged 16–18, hostage with a handgun. He surrendered peacefully and no one was harmed. The teacher suffered from depression in the past and was unemployed at the time. Although the hostage crisis lasted several hours, there was little tension. Students were allowed to call their parents by cell phone and the man promised the school staff that he would not hurt the students. Sablé-sur-Sarthe was closed off and special forces surrounded the school, ready to move in, when the crisis ended.
