= Souvigné-sur-Sarthe =

- Commune
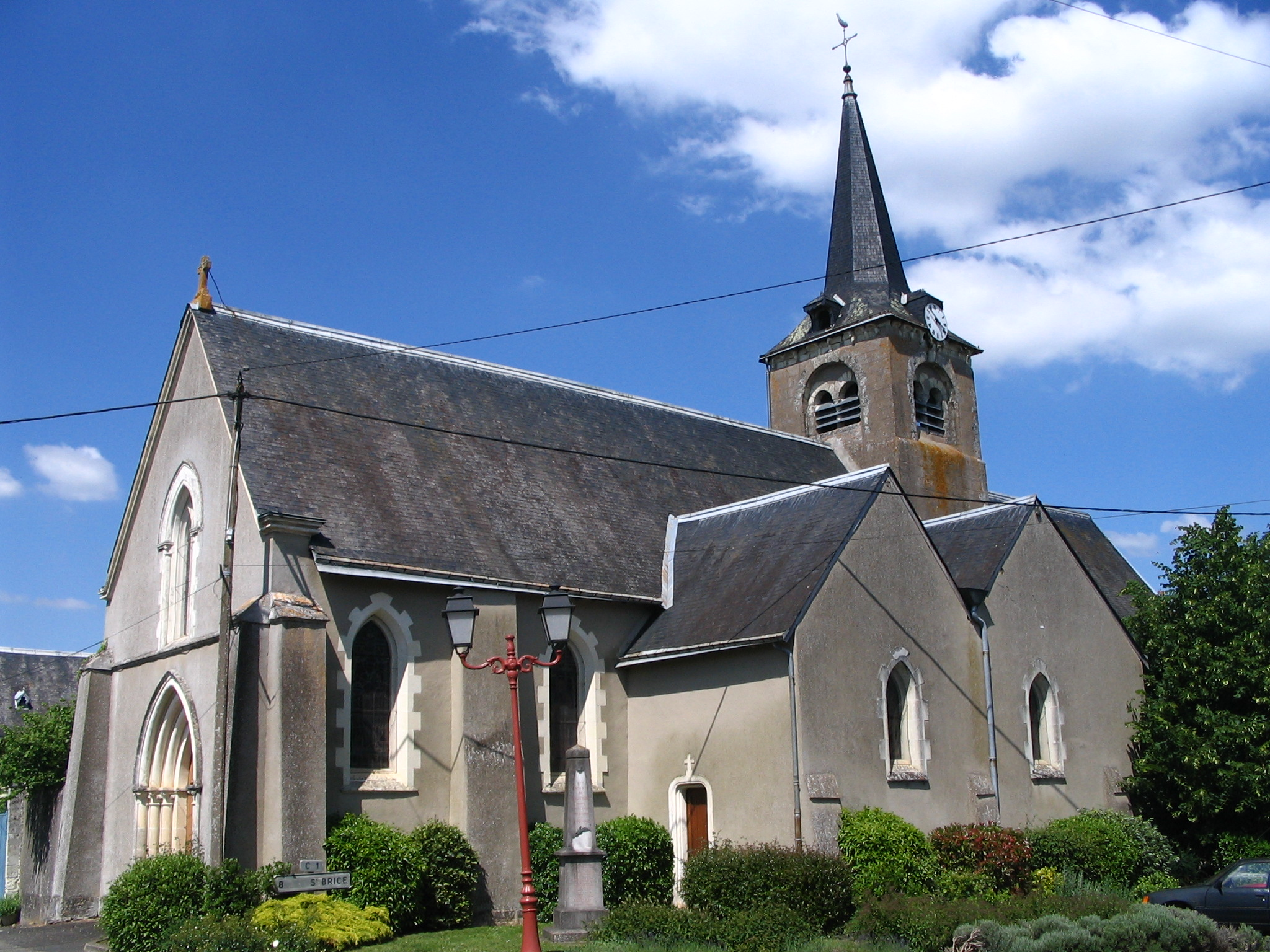
- The church of Saint-Maurille
- Location of Souvigné-sur-Sarthe
- Location within France Location within Pays de la Loire
- Coordinates: 47°49′36″N 0°23′16″W
- Country: France
- Region: Pays de la Loire
- Department: Sarthe
- Arrondissement: La Flèche
- Canton: Sablé-sur-Sarthe
- Intercommunality: CC Pays Sabolien

Government
  - Mayor (2020–2026): Mélanie Cosnier
- Area^{1}: 17.06 km^{2} (6.59 sq mi)
- Highest elevation: 50 m (160 ft)
- Lowest elevation: 20 m (66 ft)
- Population (2023): 603
  - Density: 35.3/km^{2} (91.5/sq mi)
- Demonym(s): Solviniacois, Solviniacoises; Souvignéen, Souvignéenne
- Time zone: UTC+01:00 (CET)
  - Summer (DST): UTC+02:00 (CEST)
- INSEE/Postal code: 72343 /72300
- ^{1} French Land Register data, which excludes lakes, ponds, glaciers > 1 km^{2} (0.386 sq mi or 247 acres) and river estuaries.

Souvigné-sur-Sarthe (French pronunciation: [suviɲe syʁ saʁt], literally Souvigné on Sarthe) is a commune in the Sarthe department in the region of Pays de la Loire in north-western France.

== See also ==
- Communes of the Sarthe department
