= Avessé =

- Commune
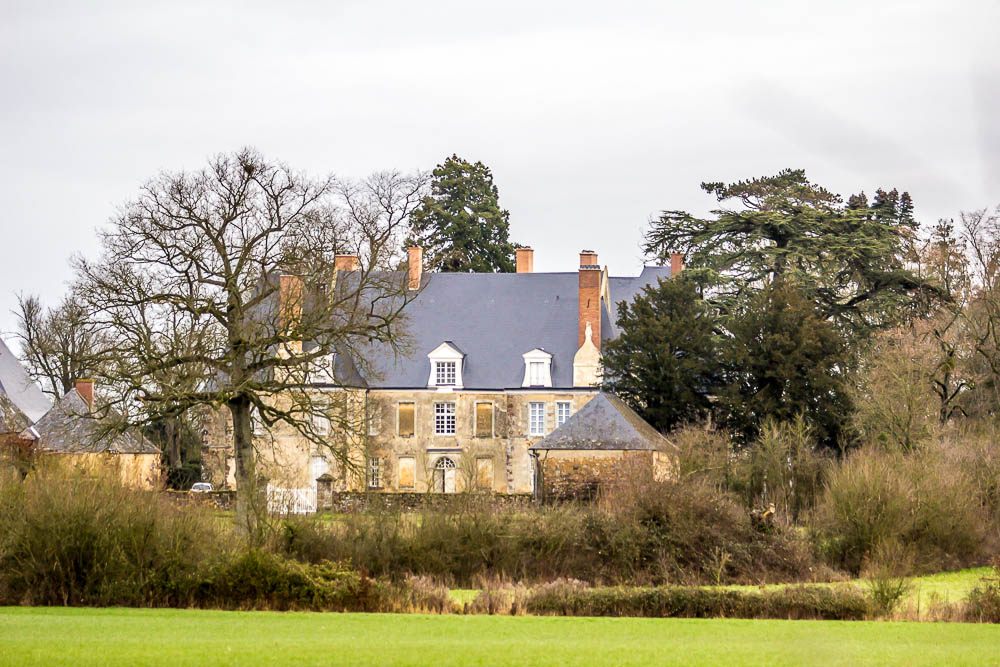
- Château de Martigné
- Location of Avessé
- Location within France Location within Pays de la Loire
- Coordinates: 47°57′25″N 0°14′56″W
- Country: France
- Region: Pays de la Loire
- Department: Sarthe
- Arrondissement: La Flèche
- Canton: Loué
- Intercommunality: CC Loué-Brûlon-Noyen

Government
  - Mayor (2020–2026): Daniel Rieucros
- Area^{1}: 18.72 km^{2} (7.23 sq mi)
- Highest elevation: 113 m (371 ft)
- Lowest elevation: 46 m (151 ft)
- Population (2023): 332
  - Density: 17.7/km^{2} (45.9/sq mi)
- Time zone: UTC+01:00 (CET)
  - Summer (DST): UTC+02:00 (CEST)
- INSEE/Postal code: 72019 /72350
- ^{1} French Land Register data, which excludes lakes, ponds, glaciers > 1 km^{2} (0.386 sq mi or 247 acres) and river estuaries.

Avessé (French pronunciation: [avɛse]) is a commune in the Sarthe department and Pays de la Loire region of north-western France.

== Geography ==
The river Vègre forms most of the commune's eastern border.

== See also ==
- Communes of the Sarthe department
