= Dureil =

- Commune
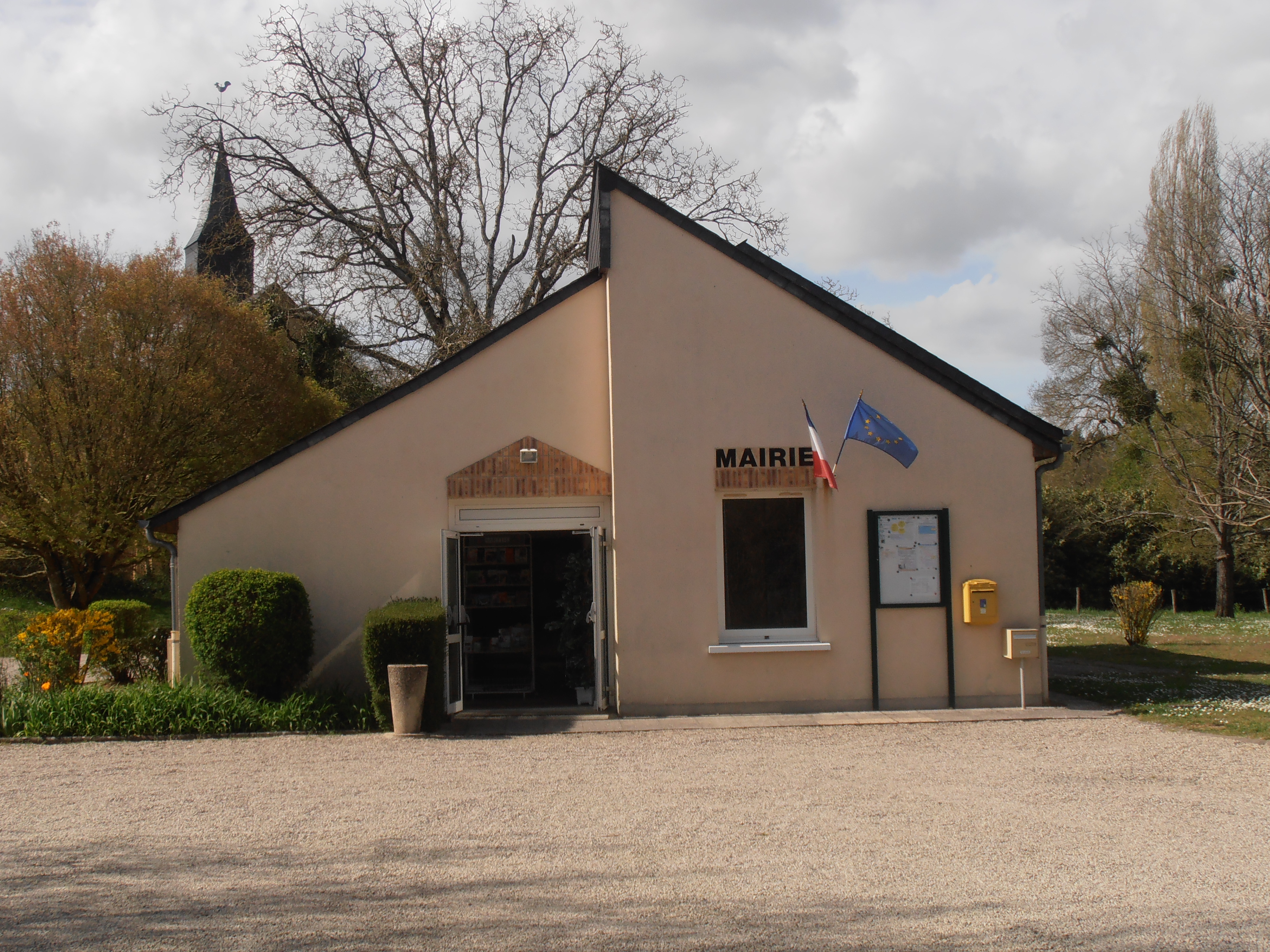
- Town hall
- Location of Dureil
- Location within France Location within Pays de la Loire
- Coordinates: 47°50′27″N 0°08′48″W
- Country: France
- Region: Pays de la Loire
- Department: Sarthe
- Arrondissement: La Flèche
- Canton: Sablé-sur-Sarthe
- Intercommunality: CC Pays Sabolien

Government
  - Mayor (2020–2026): Joël Etiembre
- Area^{1}: 8.1 km^{2} (3.1 sq mi)
- Population (2023): 61
  - Density: 7.5/km^{2} (20/sq mi)
- Demonym(s): Dureillois, Dureilloise
- Time zone: UTC+01:00 (CET)
  - Summer (DST): UTC+02:00 (CEST)
- INSEE/Postal code: 72123 /72270
- ^{1} French Land Register data, which excludes lakes, ponds, glaciers > 1 km^{2} (0.386 sq mi or 247 acres) and river estuaries.

Dureil (French pronunciation: [dyʁɛj]) is a commune in the Sarthe department in the Pays de la Loire region in north-western France.

== See also ==
- Communes of the Sarthe department
