= Avoise =

- Commune
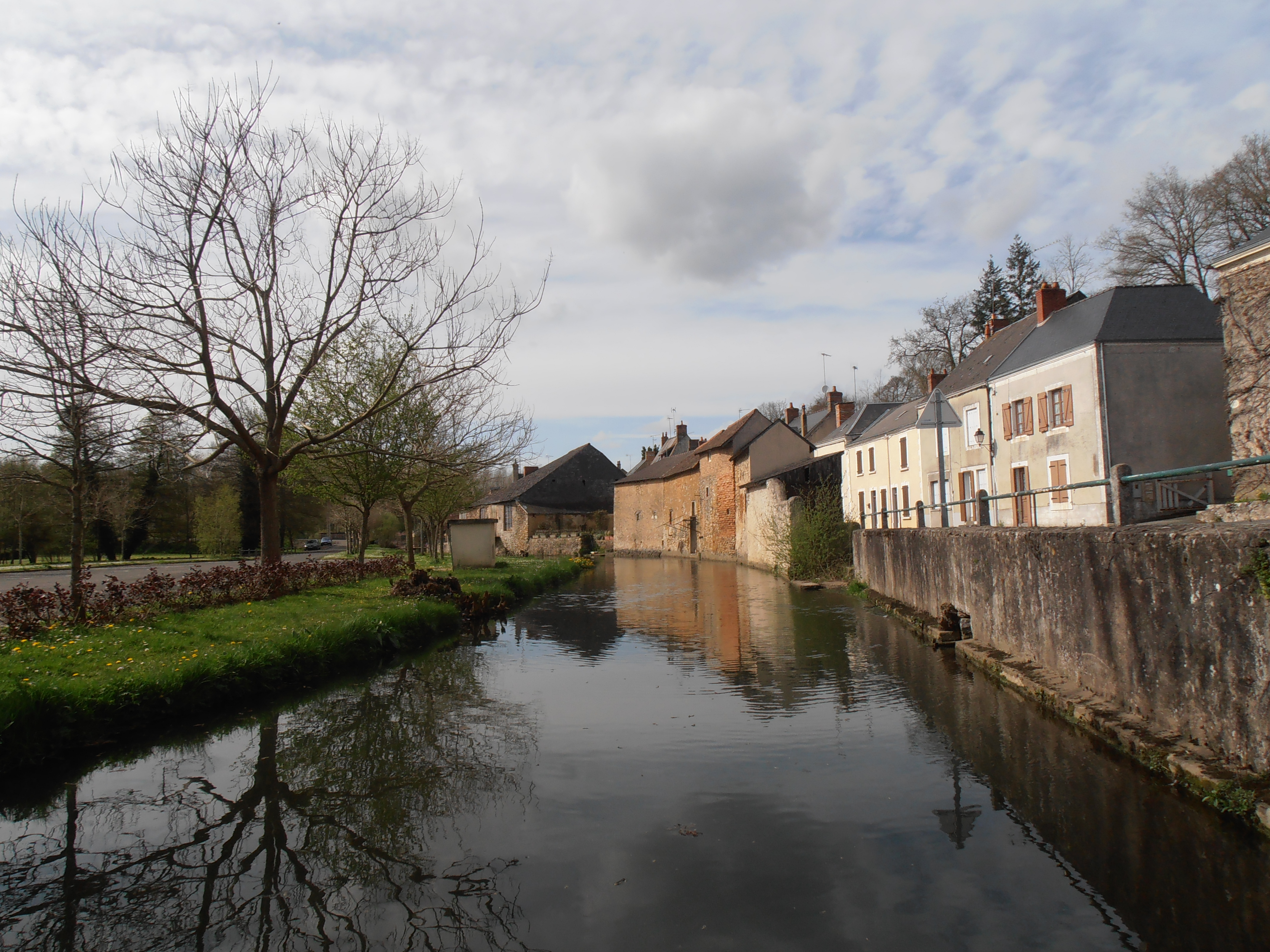
- The centre of Avoise
- Location of Avoise
- Location within France Location within Pays de la Loire
- Coordinates: 47°51′57″N 0°12′16″W
- Country: France
- Region: Pays de la Loire
- Department: Sarthe
- Arrondissement: La Flèche
- Canton: Sablé-sur-Sarthe
- Intercommunality: CC Pays Sabolien

Government
  - Mayor (2020–2026): Antoine d'Amécourt
- Area^{1}: 24.56 km^{2} (9.48 sq mi)
- Highest elevation: 70 m (230 ft)
- Lowest elevation: 22 m (72 ft)
- Population (2023): 594
  - Density: 24.2/km^{2} (62.6/sq mi)
- Demonym(s): Avoisien, Avoisienne
- Time zone: UTC+01:00 (CET)
  - Summer (DST): UTC+02:00 (CEST)
- INSEE/Postal code: 72021 /72430
- ^{1} French Land Register data, which excludes lakes, ponds, glaciers > 1 km^{2} (0.386 sq mi or 247 acres) and river estuaries.

Avoise (French pronunciation: [avwaz]) is a commune in the Sarthe department in the region of Pays de la Loire in north-western France.

== Geography ==
The Vègre flows southward through the western part of the commune, then flows into the Sarthe River, which forms all of the commune's southern border.

The village lies on the right bank of the Sarthe.

== See also ==
- Communes of the Sarthe department
