= Auvers-le-Hamon =

- Commune
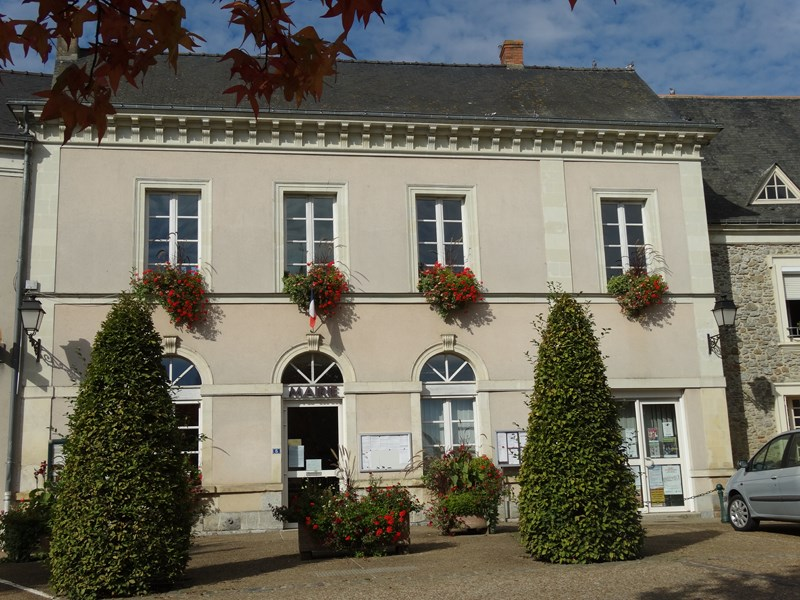
- The town hall of Auvers-le-Hamon

- Coat of arms
- Location of Auvers-le-Hamon
- Location within France Location within Pays de la Loire
- Coordinates: 47°54′11″N 0°21′02″W
- Country: France
- Region: Pays de la Loire
- Department: Sarthe
- Arrondissement: La Flèche
- Canton: Sablé-sur-Sarthe
- Intercommunality: CC Pays Sabolien

Government
  - Mayor (2020–2026): Jean-Louis Lemaitre
- Area^{1}: 47.83 km^{2} (18.47 sq mi)
- Highest elevation: 93 m (305 ft)
- Lowest elevation: 29 m (95 ft)
- Population (2023): 1,445
  - Density: 30.21/km^{2} (78.25/sq mi)
- Demonym(s): Auversois, Auversoise
- Time zone: UTC+01:00 (CET)
  - Summer (DST): UTC+02:00 (CEST)
- INSEE/Postal code: 72016 /72300
- ^{1} French Land Register data, which excludes lakes, ponds, glaciers > 1 km^{2} (0.386 sq mi or 247 acres) and river estuaries.

Auvers-le-Hamon (French pronunciation: [ovɛʁ lə amɔ̃]) is a commune in the Sarthe department in the region of Pays de la Loire in north-western France.

== Geography ==
The Vaige forms part of the commune's south-western border.

== See also ==
- Communes of the Sarthe department
