= Bernay-en-Champagne =

- Part of Bernay-Neuvy-en-Champagne
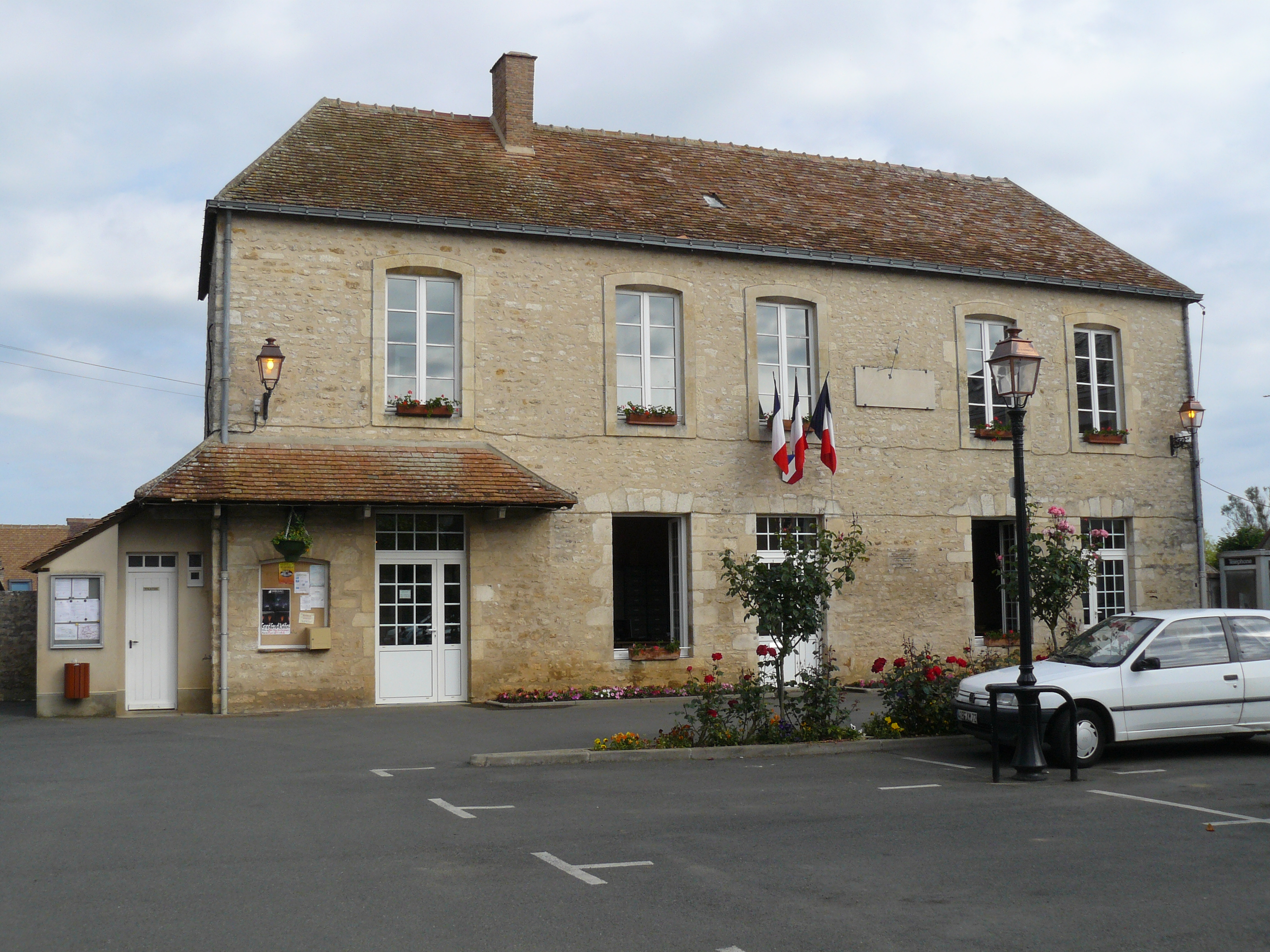
- Town hall
- Location of Bernay-en-Champagne
- Location within France Location within Pays de la Loire
- Coordinates: 48°04′00″N 0°04′00″W
- Country: France
- Region: Pays de la Loire
- Department: Sarthe
- Arrondissement: Mamers
- Canton: Loué
- Commune: Bernay-Neuvy-en-Champagne
- Area^{1}: 10.34 km^{2} (3.99 sq mi)
- Highest elevation: 177 m (581 ft)
- Lowest elevation: 80 m (260 ft)
- Population (2016): 491
  - Density: 47.5/km^{2} (123/sq mi)
- Time zone: UTC+01:00 (CET)
  - Summer (DST): UTC+02:00 (CEST)
- Postal code: 72240
- ^{1} French Land Register data, which excludes lakes, ponds, glaciers > 1 km^{2} (0.386 sq mi or 247 acres) and river estuaries.

Bernay-en-Champagne (French pronunciation: [bɛʁnɛ ɑ̃ ʃɑ̃paɲ]; formerly Bernay) is a former commune in the Sarthe department in the region of Pays de la Loire in north-western France. On 1 January 2019, it was merged into the new commune Bernay-Neuvy-en-Champagne.

== Geography ==
The village lies on the left bank of the Vègre, which forms all of the commune's north-eastern border, then flows southwestward through the commune.

== See also ==
- Communes of the Sarthe department
