= Le Bailleul =

- Commune
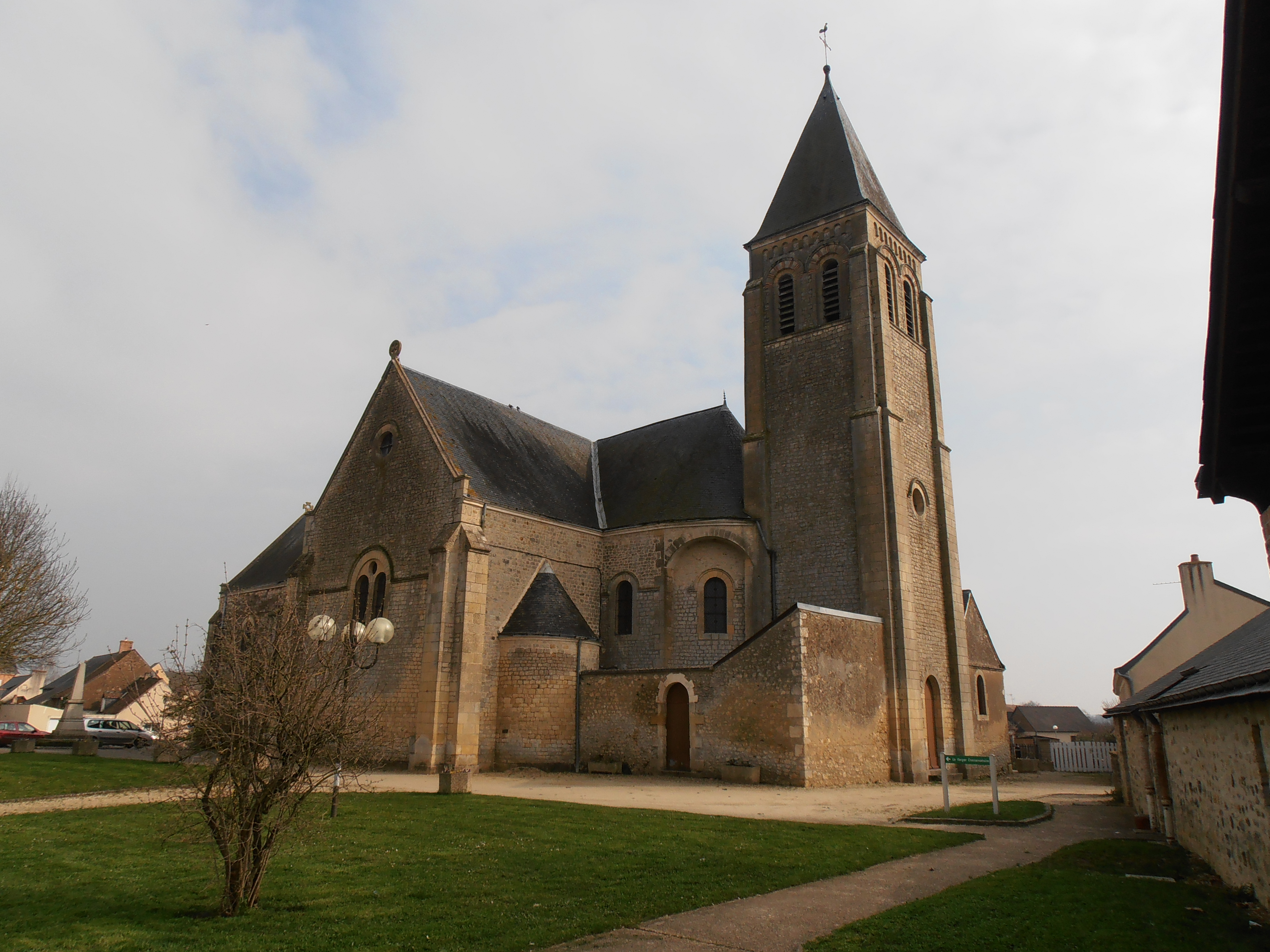
- The church of Saint-Pierre, in Le Bailleul

- Coat of arms
- Location of Le Bailleul
- Location within France Location within Pays de la Loire
- Coordinates: 47°46′07″N 0°09′29″W
- Country: France
- Region: Pays de la Loire
- Department: Sarthe
- Arrondissement: La Flèche
- Canton: Sablé-sur-Sarthe
- Intercommunality: CC Pays Sabolien

Government
  - Mayor (2020–2026): Eric David
- Area^{1}: 27.8 km^{2} (10.7 sq mi)
- Population (2023): 1,217
  - Density: 43.8/km^{2} (113/sq mi)
- Demonym(s): Bailleulois, Bailleuloise
- Time zone: UTC+01:00 (CET)
  - Summer (DST): UTC+02:00 (CEST)
- INSEE/Postal code: 72022 /72200
- ^{1} French Land Register data, which excludes lakes, ponds, glaciers > 1 km^{2} (0.386 sq mi or 247 acres) and river estuaries.

Le Bailleul (French pronunciation: [lə bajœl]) is a commune in the Sarthe department in the region of Pays de la Loire in north-western France.

== See also ==
- Communes of the Sarthe department
