= Saint-Ouen-en-Champagne =

- Commune
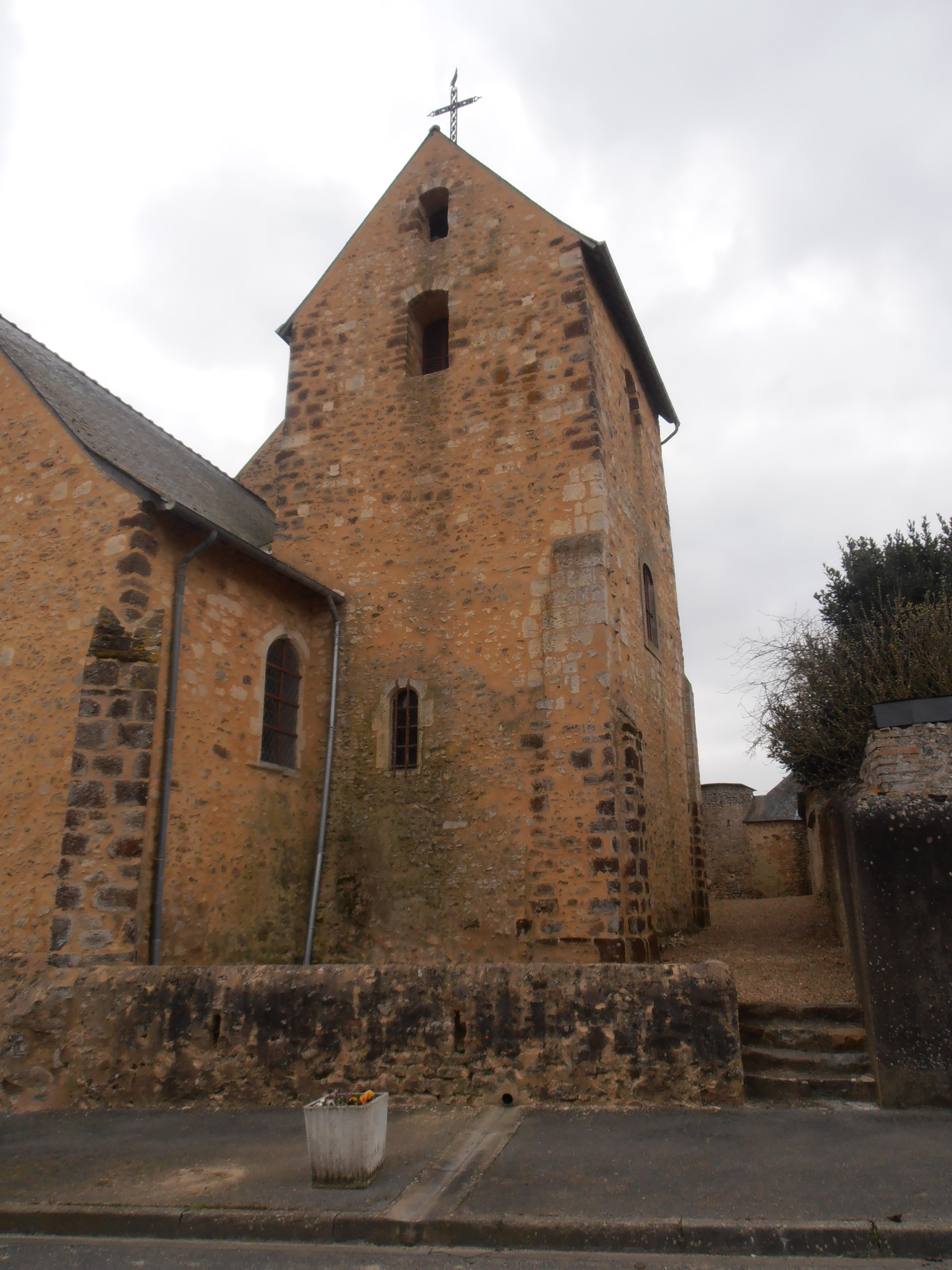
- The bell tower of the church
- Location of Saint-Ouen-en-Champagne
- Location within France Location within Pays de la Loire
- Coordinates: 47°57′03″N 0°11′19″W
- Country: France
- Region: Pays de la Loire
- Department: Sarthe
- Arrondissement: La Flèche
- Canton: Loué
- Intercommunality: Loué-Brûlon-Noyen

Government
  - Mayor (2020–2026): Dominique Guerriau
- Area^{1}: 11.2 km^{2} (4.3 sq mi)
- Highest elevation: 121 m (397 ft)
- Lowest elevation: 52 m (171 ft)
- Population (2023): 237
  - Density: 21.2/km^{2} (54.8/sq mi)
- Demonym(s): Audonien, Audonienne
- Time zone: UTC+01:00 (CET)
  - Summer (DST): UTC+02:00 (CEST)
- INSEE/Postal code: 72307 /72350
- ^{1} French Land Register data, which excludes lakes, ponds, glaciers > 1 km^{2} (0.386 sq mi or 247 acres) and river estuaries.

Saint-Ouen-en-Champagne (French pronunciation: [sɛ̃t‿wɛ̃ ɑ̃ ʃɑ̃paɲ]) is a commune in the Sarthe department in the region of Pays de la Loire in north-western France.

== Geography ==
The river Vègre forms all of the commune's northern border.

== See also ==
- Communes of the Sarthe department
