= Tennie =

- Commune
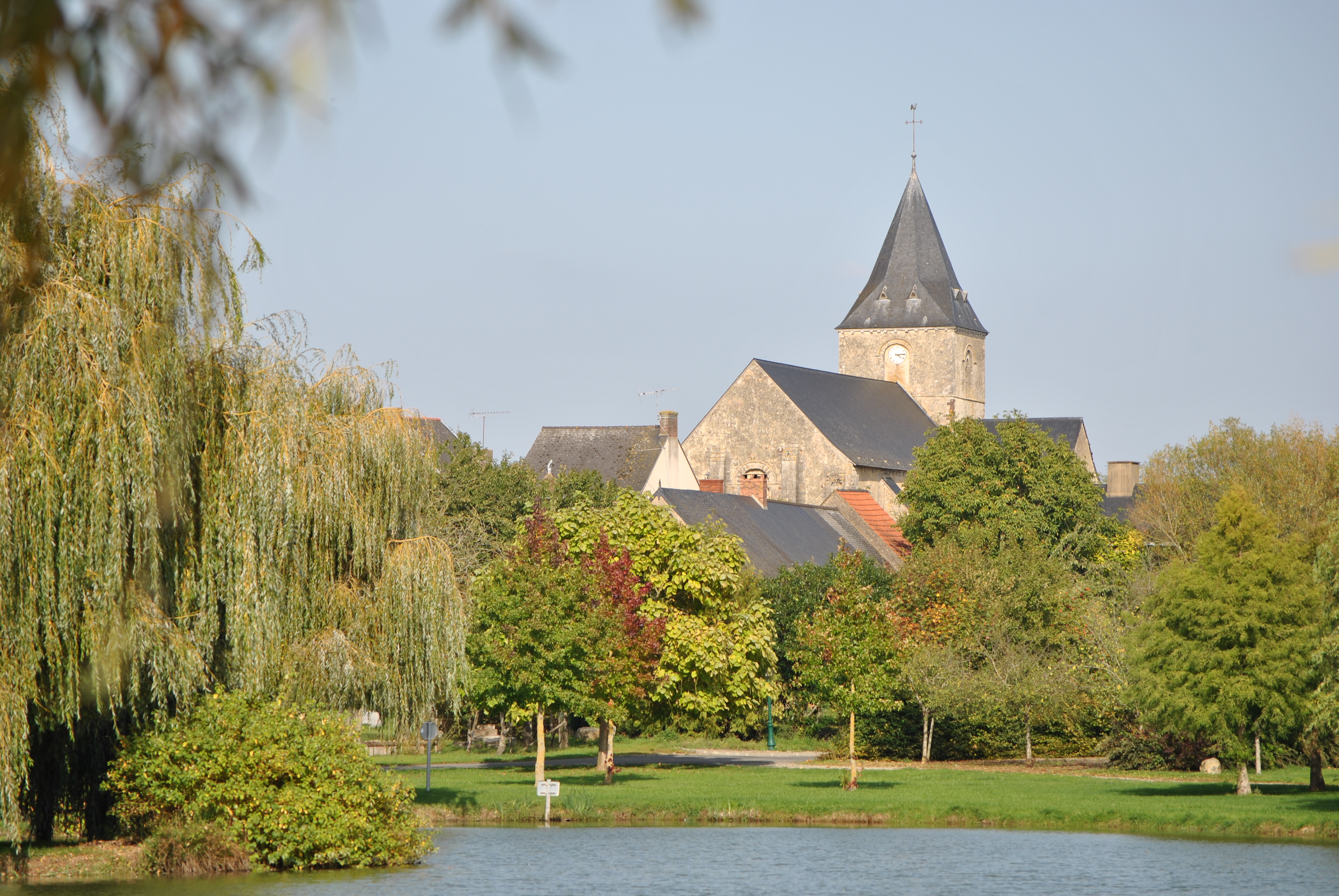
- The lake and the church of Sainte-Corneille and Saint-Cyprien
- Location of Tennie
- Location within France Location within Pays de la Loire
- Coordinates: 48°06′29″N 0°04′29″W
- Country: France
- Region: Pays de la Loire
- Department: Sarthe
- Arrondissement: Mamers
- Canton: Loué
- Intercommunality: Champagne Conlinoise et Pays de Sillé

Government
  - Mayor (2020–2026): Michel Patry
- Area^{1}: 33.13 km^{2} (12.79 sq mi)
- Highest elevation: 189 m (620 ft)
- Lowest elevation: 84 m (276 ft)
- Population (2023): 1,000
  - Density: 30/km^{2} (78/sq mi)
- Demonym(s): Tennisien, Tennisienne
- Time zone: UTC+01:00 (CET)
  - Summer (DST): UTC+02:00 (CEST)
- INSEE/Postal code: 72351 /72240
- ^{1} French Land Register data, which excludes lakes, ponds, glaciers > 1 km^{2} (0.386 sq mi or 247 acres) and river estuaries.

Tennie (French pronunciation: [teni]) is a commune in the Sarthe department in the region of Pays de la Loire in north-western France.

== Geography ==
The village lies in the middle of the commune, on the left bank of the Vègre, which flows southwestward through the commune.

== See also ==
- Communes of the Sarthe department
