= Mareil-en-Champagne =

- Commune
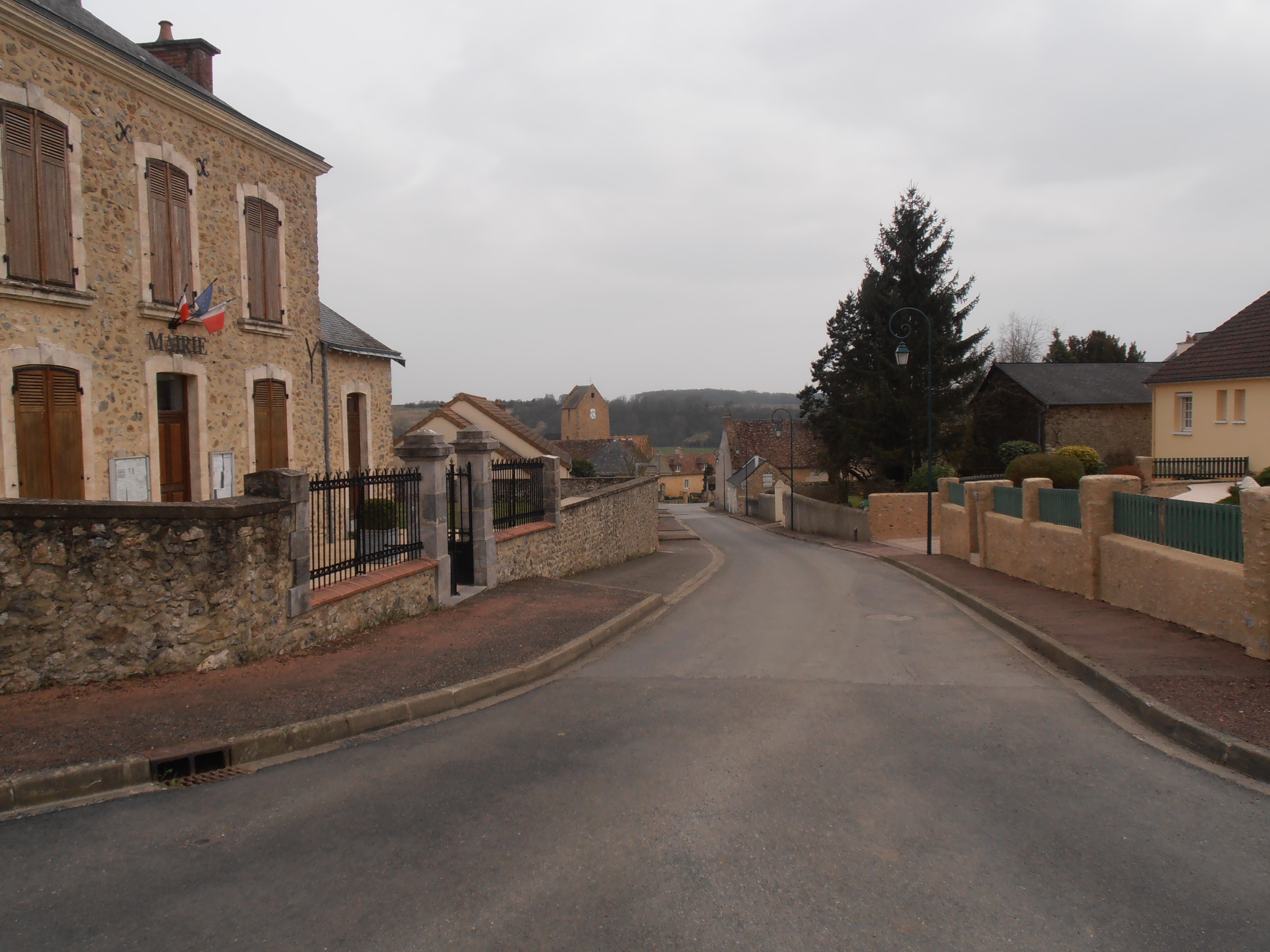
- Mareil-en-Champagne seen from the town hall
- Location of Mareil-en-Champagne
- Location within France Location within Pays de la Loire
- Coordinates: 47°59′06″N 0°10′05″W
- Country: France
- Region: Pays de la Loire
- Department: Sarthe
- Arrondissement: La Flèche
- Canton: Loué
- Intercommunality: Loué - Brûlon - Noyen

Government
  - Mayor (2020–2026): Christophe Busson
- Area^{1}: 7.97 km^{2} (3.08 sq mi)
- Highest elevation: 127 m (417 ft)
- Lowest elevation: 52 m (171 ft)
- Population (2023): 342
  - Density: 42.9/km^{2} (111/sq mi)
- Time zone: UTC+01:00 (CET)
  - Summer (DST): UTC+02:00 (CEST)
- INSEE/Postal code: 72184 /72540
- ^{1} French Land Register data, which excludes lakes, ponds, glaciers > 1 km^{2} (0.386 sq mi or 247 acres) and river estuaries.

Mareil-en-Champagne (French pronunciation: [maʁɛj ɑ̃ ʃɑ̃paɲ]) is a commune in the Sarthe department in the region of Pays de la Loire in north-western France.

== Geography ==
The river Vègre forms part of the commune's north-eastern border, flows southwestward through the commune, then forms most of its south-western border.

== See also ==
- Communes of the Sarthe department
