= Épineu-le-Chevreuil =

- Commune
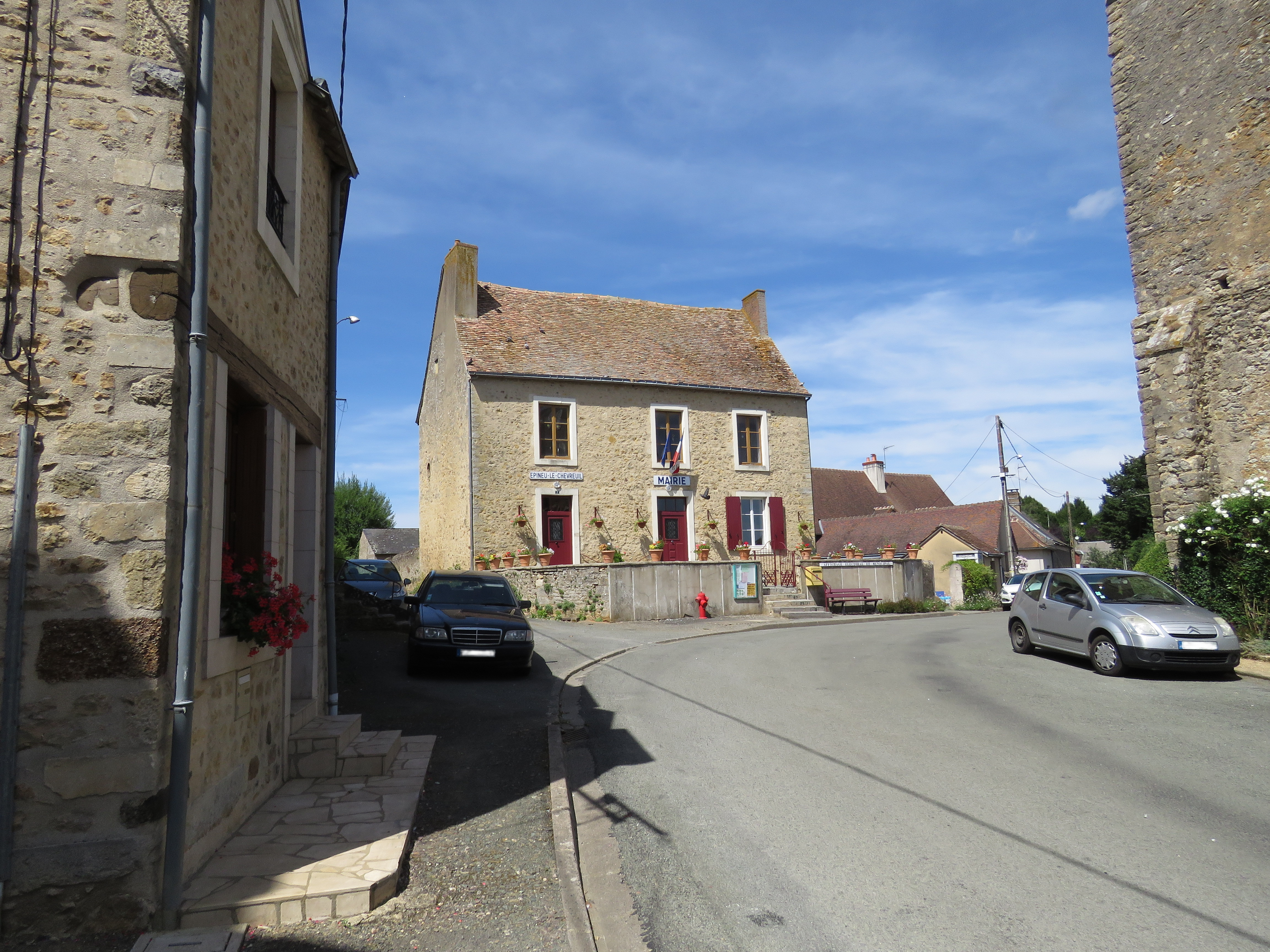
- The town hall of Épineu-le-Chevreuil

- Coat of arms
- Location of Épineu-le-Chevreuil
- Location within France Location within Pays de la Loire
- Coordinates: 48°02′19″N 0°06′51″W
- Country: France
- Region: Pays de la Loire
- Department: Sarthe
- Arrondissement: La Flèche
- Canton: Loué
- Intercommunality: Loué - Brûlon - Noyen

Government
  - Mayor (2020–2026): Sébastien Huet
- Area^{1}: 14.70 km^{2} (5.68 sq mi)
- Highest elevation: 161 m (528 ft)
- Lowest elevation: 72 m (236 ft)
- Population (2023): 286
  - Density: 19.5/km^{2} (50.4/sq mi)
- Demonym(s): Spinéen, Spinéenne
- Time zone: UTC+01:00 (CET)
  - Summer (DST): UTC+02:00 (CEST)
- INSEE/Postal code: 72126 /72540
- ^{1} French Land Register data, which excludes lakes, ponds, glaciers > 1 km^{2} (0.386 sq mi or 247 acres) and river estuaries.

Épineu-le-Chevreuil (French pronunciation: [epinø lə ʃəvʁœj]) is a commune in the Sarthe department in the Pays de la Loire region in north-western France.

== Geography ==
The river Vègre flows southwestward through the eastern part of the commune, then forms part of its southern border.

== See also ==
- Communes of the Sarthe department
