= Ruillé-en-Champagne =

- Commune
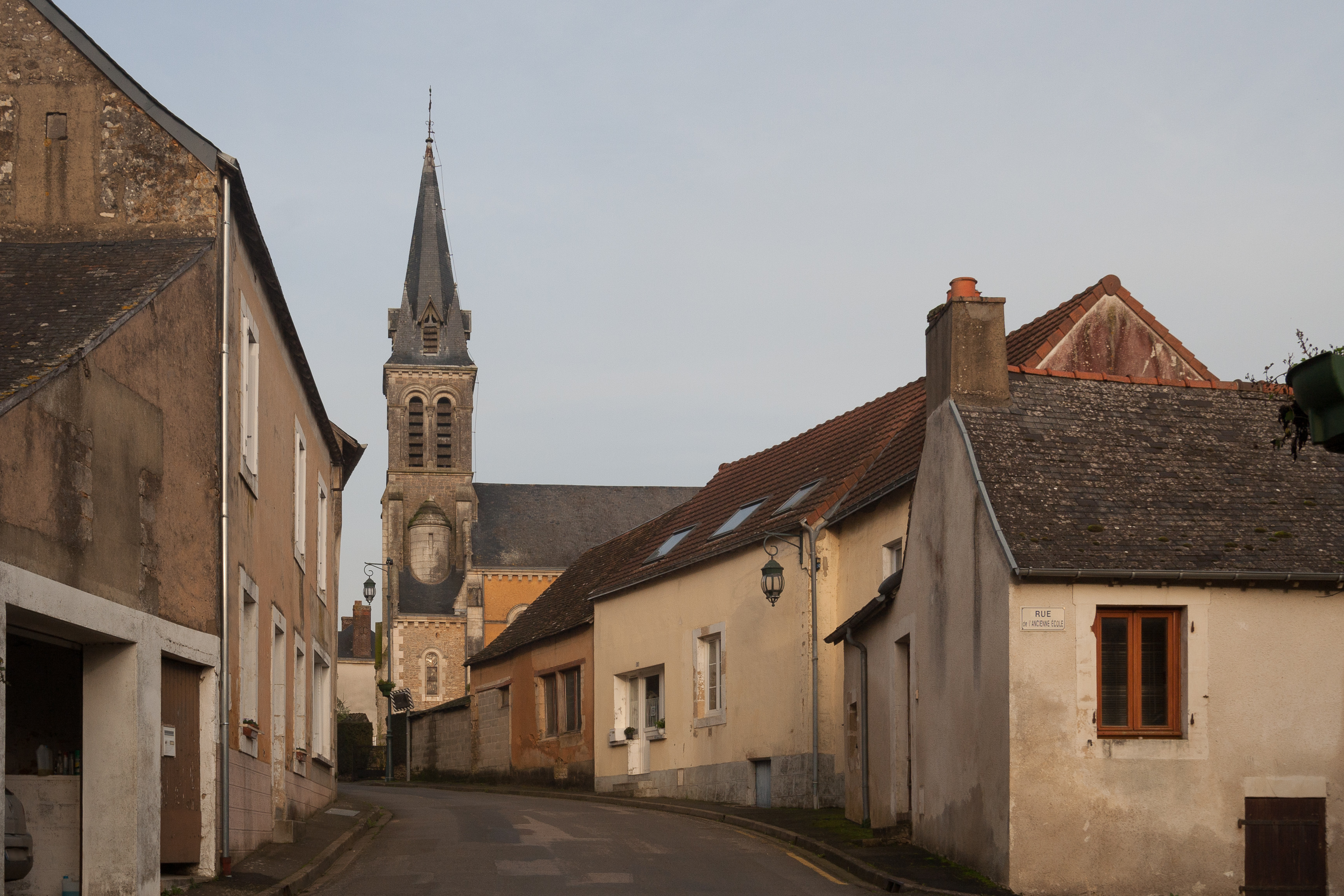
- The centre of the village of Ruillé-en-Champagne
- Location of Ruillé-en-Champagne
- Location within France Location within Pays de la Loire
- Coordinates: 48°03′38″N 0°04′53″W
- Country: France
- Region: Pays de la Loire
- Department: Sarthe
- Arrondissement: Mamers
- Canton: Loué
- Intercommunality: Champagne Conlinoise et Pays de Sillé

Government
  - Mayor (2020–2026): Thierry Dubois
- Area^{1}: 15 km^{2} (5.8 sq mi)
- Population (2023): 310
  - Density: 21/km^{2} (54/sq mi)
- Demonym(s): Ruilléens, Ruilléenne
- Time zone: UTC+01:00 (CET)
  - Summer (DST): UTC+02:00 (CEST)
- INSEE/Postal code: 72261 /72240
- ^{1} French Land Register data, which excludes lakes, ponds, glaciers > 1 km^{2} (0.386 sq mi or 247 acres) and river estuaries.

Ruillé-en-Champagne is a commune in the Sarthe department in the Pays de la Loire region in north-western France.

== Geography ==
The river Vègre flows southwestward through the commune.

== See also ==
- Communes of the Sarthe department
