= Bernay-Neuvy-en-Champagne =

- Commune
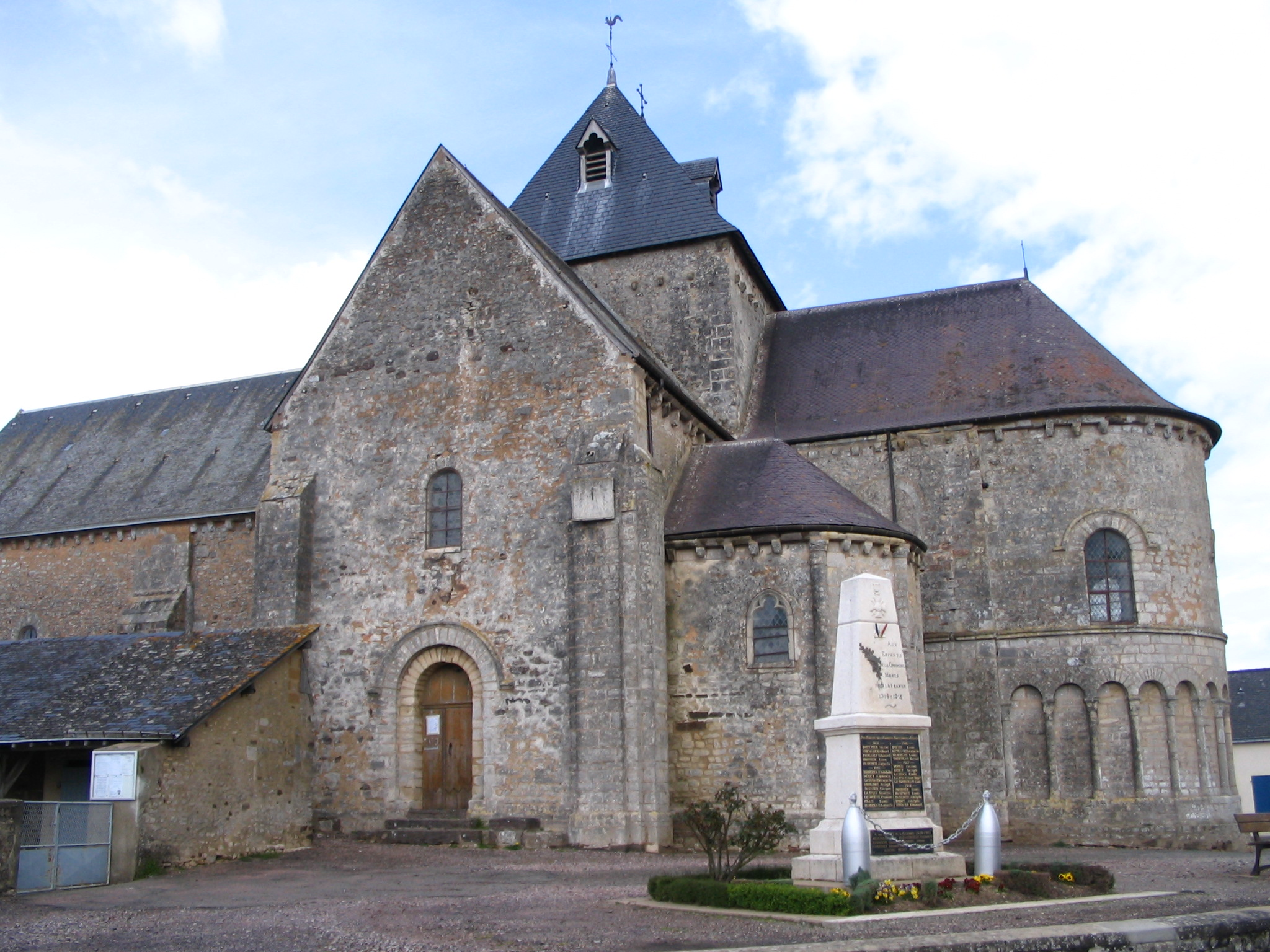
- The church of Neuvy-en-Champagne
- Location of Bernay-Neuvy-en-Champagne
- Location within France Location within Pays de la Loire
- Coordinates: 48°04′55″N 0°02′21″W
- Country: France
- Region: Pays de la Loire
- Department: Sarthe
- Arrondissement: Mamers
- Canton: Loué
- Intercommunality: Champagne Conlinoise et Pays de Sillé

Government
  - Mayor (2020–2026): Vincent Hulot
- Area^{1}: 25.13 km^{2} (9.70 sq mi)
- Population (2023): 756
  - Density: 30.1/km^{2} (77.9/sq mi)
- Time zone: UTC+01:00 (CET)
  - Summer (DST): UTC+02:00 (CEST)
- INSEE/Postal code: 72219 /72240
- ^{1} French Land Register data, which excludes lakes, ponds, glaciers > 1 km^{2} (0.386 sq mi or 247 acres) and river estuaries.

Bernay-Neuvy-en-Champagne (French pronunciation: [bɛʁnɛ nøvi ɑ̃ ʃɑ̃paɲ]) is a commune in the Sarthe department in the region of Pays de la Loire in north-western France. It was established on 1 January 2019 by merger of the former communes of Neuvy-en-Champagne (the seat) and Bernay-en-Champagne.

== See also ==
- Communes of the Sarthe department
