= Rouessé-Vassé =

- Commune
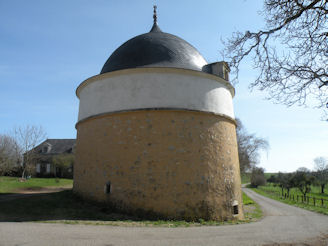
- The dovecote of Vassé
- Location of Rouessé-Vassé
- Location within France Location within Pays de la Loire
- Coordinates: 48°09′34″N 0°11′52″W
- Country: France
- Region: Pays de la Loire
- Department: Sarthe
- Arrondissement: Mamers
- Canton: Sillé-le-Guillaume
- Intercommunality: Champagne Conlinoise et Pays de Sillé

Government
  - Mayor (2020–2026): Hugues Bombled
- Area^{1}: 31.49 km^{2} (12.16 sq mi)
- Highest elevation: 302 m (991 ft)
- Lowest elevation: 107 m (351 ft)
- Population (2023): 785
  - Density: 24.9/km^{2} (64.6/sq mi)
- Demonym: Rouesséens
- Time zone: UTC+01:00 (CET)
  - Summer (DST): UTC+02:00 (CEST)
- INSEE/Postal code: 72255 /72140
- ^{1} French Land Register data, which excludes lakes, ponds, glaciers > 1 km^{2} (0.386 sq mi or 247 acres) and river estuaries.

Rouessé-Vassé (French pronunciation: [ʁwɛse vase]) is a commune in the Sarthe department in the region of Pays de la Loire in north-western France. Its inhabitants are called les Rouesséens.

== Geography ==
The Vègre has its source in the commune.

== See also ==
- Communes of the Sarthe department
- Parc naturel régional Normandie-Maine
