= Notre-Dame-du-Pé =

- Commune
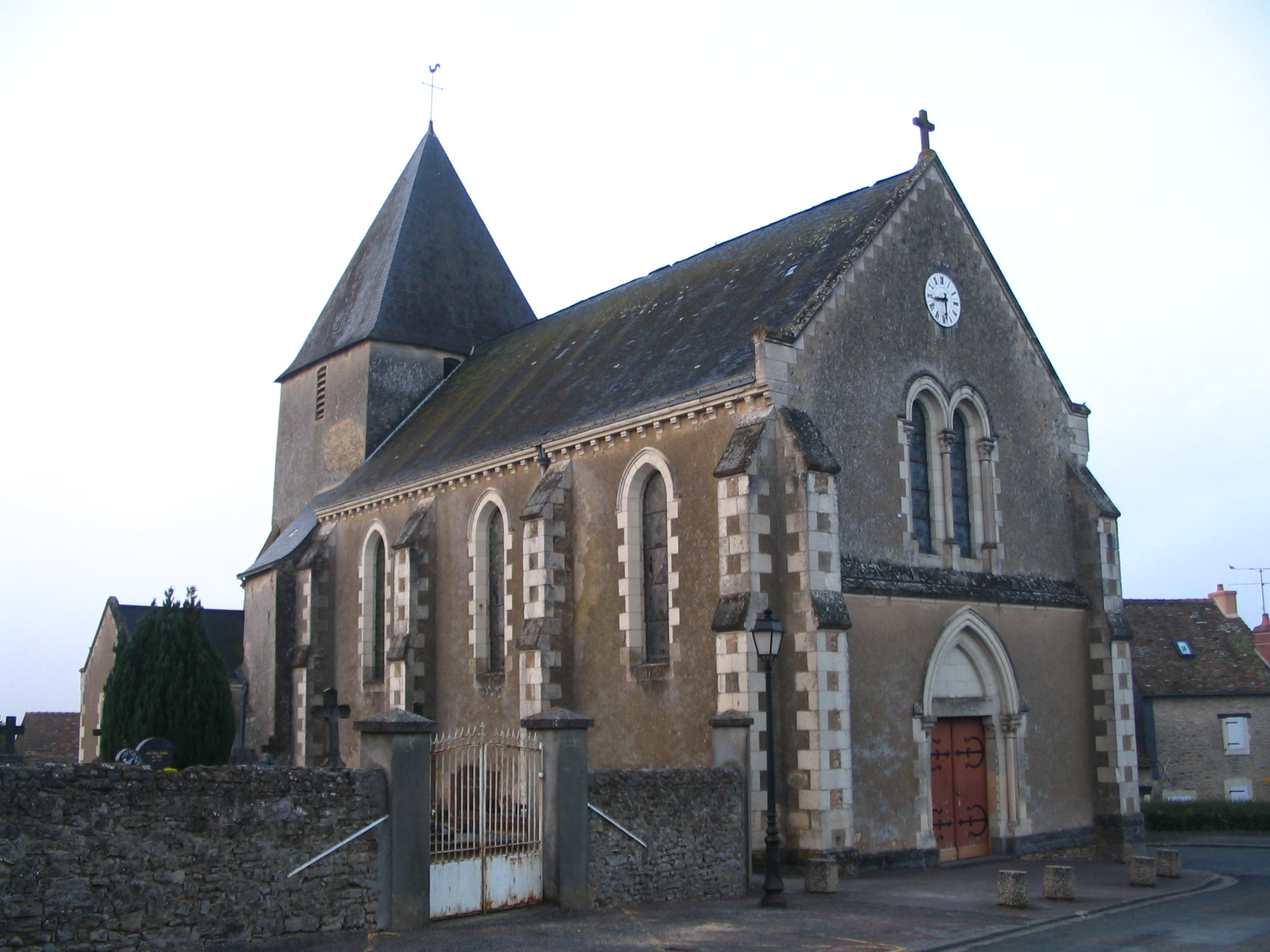
- The church of Notre-Dame du Pé
- Location of Notre-Dame-du-Pé
- Location within France Location within Pays de la Loire
- Coordinates: 47°44′29″N 0°19′28″W
- Country: France
- Region: Pays de la Loire
- Department: Sarthe
- Arrondissement: La Flèche
- Canton: Sablé-sur-Sarthe
- Intercommunality: CC Pays Sabolien

Government
  - Mayor (2020–2026): Claude Davy
- Area^{1}: 7.75 km^{2} (2.99 sq mi)
- Highest elevation: 70 m (230 ft)
- Lowest elevation: 22 m (72 ft)
- Population (2023): 710
  - Density: 92/km^{2} (240/sq mi)
- Demonym(s): Pépéen, Pépéenne
- Time zone: UTC+01:00 (CET)
  - Summer (DST): UTC+02:00 (CEST)
- INSEE/Postal code: 72232 /72300
- ^{1} French Land Register data, which excludes lakes, ponds, glaciers > 1 km^{2} (0.386 sq mi or 247 acres) and river estuaries.

Notre-Dame-du-Pé (French pronunciation: [nɔtʁə dam dy pe]) is a commune in the Sarthe department in the region of Pays de la Loire in north-western France.

== See also ==
- Communes of the Sarthe department
