= Fontenay-sur-Vègre =

- Commune
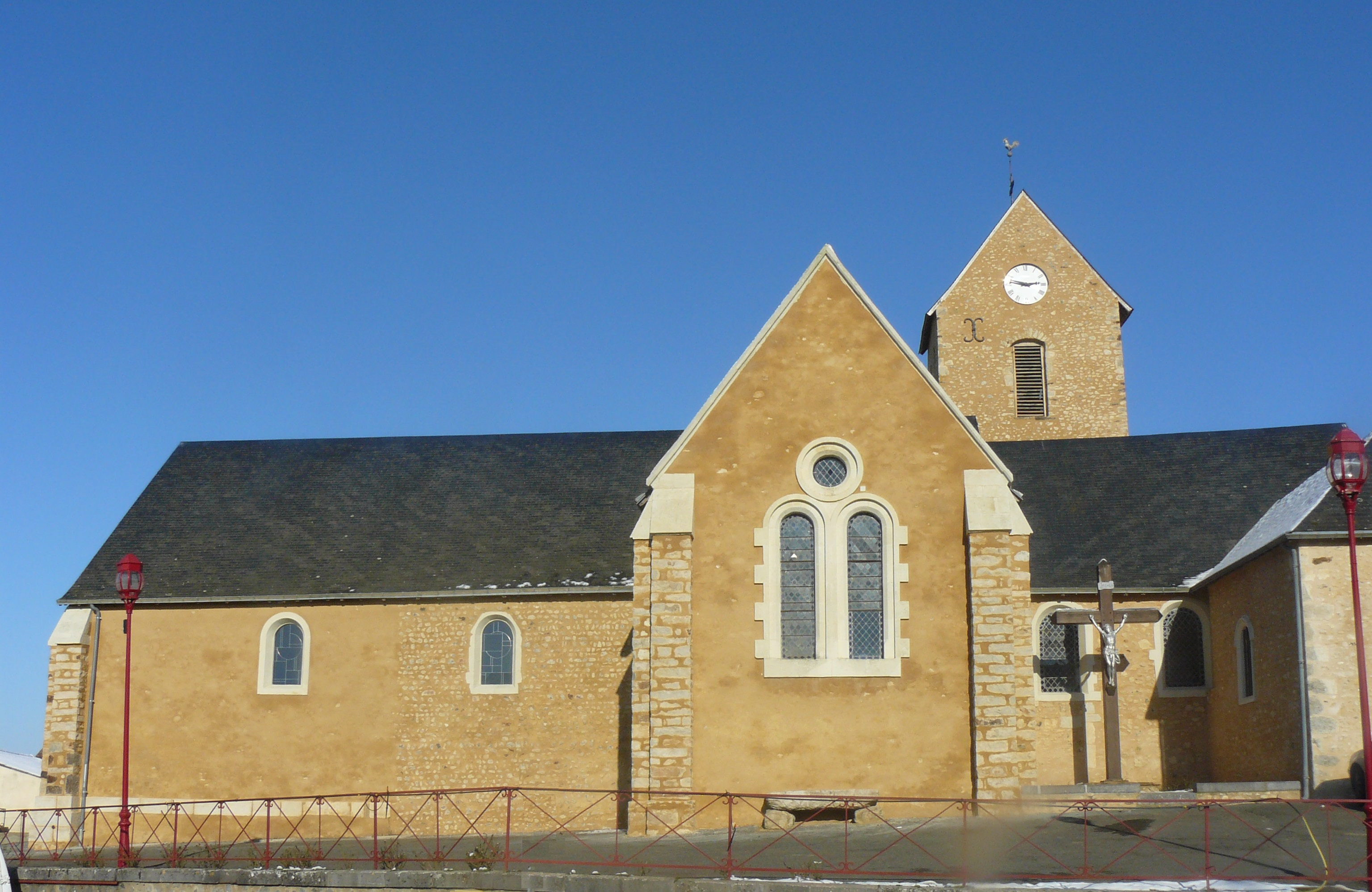
- The church of Saint Philibert

- Coat of arms
- Location of Fontenay-sur-Vègre
- Location within France Location within Pays de la Loire
- Coordinates: 47°54′16″N 0°13′12″W
- Country: France
- Region: Pays de la Loire
- Department: Sarthe
- Arrondissement: La Flèche
- Canton: Loué
- Intercommunality: Loué-Brûlon-Noyen

Government
  - Mayor (2020–2026): Monique Lhopital
- Area^{1}: 11.46 km^{2} (4.42 sq mi)
- Highest elevation: 74 m (243 ft)
- Lowest elevation: 37 m (121 ft)
- Population (2023): 307
  - Density: 26.8/km^{2} (69.4/sq mi)
- Demonym(s): Fontenaysien, Fontenaysienne
- Time zone: UTC+01:00 (CET)
  - Summer (DST): UTC+02:00 (CEST)
- INSEE/Postal code: 72136 /72350
- ^{1} French Land Register data, which excludes lakes, ponds, glaciers > 1 km^{2} (0.386 sq mi or 247 acres) and river estuaries.

Fontenay-sur-Vègre (French pronunciation: [fɔ̃tnɛ syʁ vɛɡʁ], literally Fontenay on Vègre) is a commune in the Sarthe department in the region of Pays de la Loire in northwestern France.
