= Rouez =

Rouez-en-Champagne
- Commune
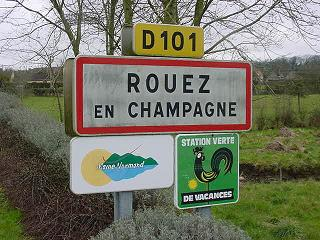
- A road sign at the entrance to Rouez

- Coat of arms
- Location of Rouez-en-Champagne
- Location within France Location within Pays de la Loire
- Coordinates: 48°08′25″N 0°06′46″W
- Country: France
- Region: Pays de la Loire
- Department: Sarthe
- Arrondissement: Mamers
- Canton: Sillé-le-Guillaume
- Intercommunality: Champagne Conlinoise et Pays de Sillé

Government
  - Mayor (2020–2026): Ludovic Robidas
- Area^{1}: 33.65 km^{2} (12.99 sq mi)
- Highest elevation: 171 m (561 ft)
- Lowest elevation: 92 m (302 ft)
- Population (2023): 804
  - Density: 23.9/km^{2} (61.9/sq mi)
- Demonym: Rouéziens
- Time zone: UTC+01:00 (CET)
  - Summer (DST): UTC+02:00 (CEST)
- INSEE/Postal code: 72256 /72140
- ^{1} French Land Register data, which excludes lakes, ponds, glaciers > 1 km^{2} (0.386 sq mi or 247 acres) and river estuaries.

Rouez (French pronunciation: [ʁwe]), also called Rouez-en-Champagne, is a commune in the Sarthe department in the region of Pays de la Loire in north-western France.

== Geography ==
The village lies in the middle of the commune, on the left bank of the Merdereau, a left tributary of the Vègre, which flows southeastward through the commune.

== See also ==
- Communes of the Sarthe department
