= Chassillé =

- Commune
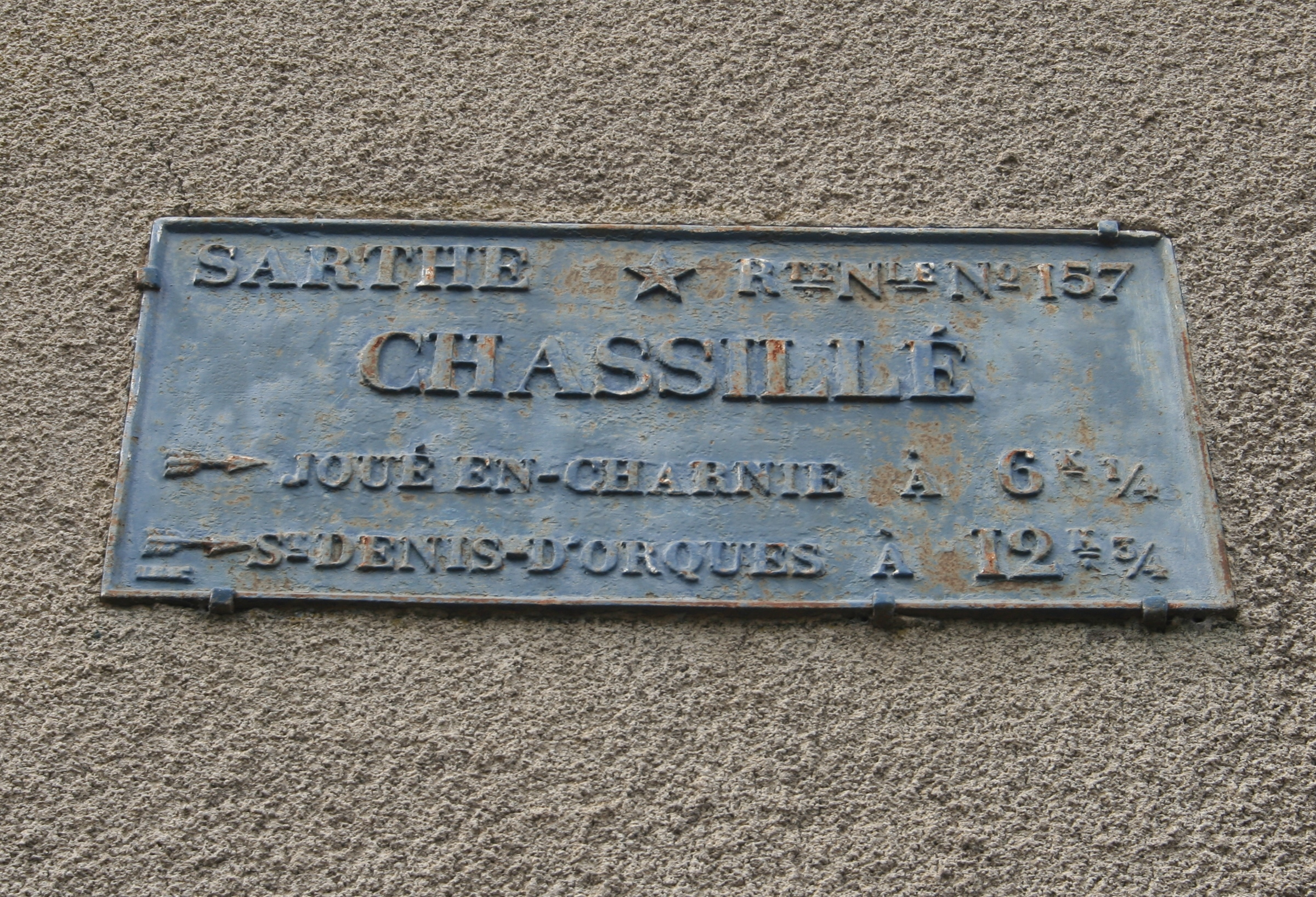
- Plaque beside the old National Route 157
- Location of Chassillé
- Location within France Location within Pays de la Loire
- Coordinates: 48°01′16″N 0°06′53″W
- Country: France
- Region: Pays de la Loire
- Department: Sarthe
- Arrondissement: La Flèche
- Canton: Loué
- Intercommunality: Loué - Brûlon - Noyen

Government
  - Mayor (2020–2026): Michel Legendre
- Area^{1}: 7.3 km^{2} (2.8 sq mi)
- Population (2023): 249
  - Density: 34/km^{2} (88/sq mi)
- Demonym(s): Coquins, Coquine
- Time zone: UTC+01:00 (CET)
  - Summer (DST): UTC+02:00 (CEST)
- INSEE/Postal code: 72070 /72540
- ^{1} French Land Register data, which excludes lakes, ponds, glaciers > 1 km^{2} (0.386 sq mi or 247 acres) and river estuaries.

Chassillé (French pronunciation: [ʃasije]) is a commune in the Sarthe department in the Pays de la Loire region in north-western France.

== Geography ==
The village lies on the right bank of the Vègre, which flows southwestward through the commune.

== See also ==
- Communes of the Sarthe department
