= Sablé-sur-Sarthe =

- Commune
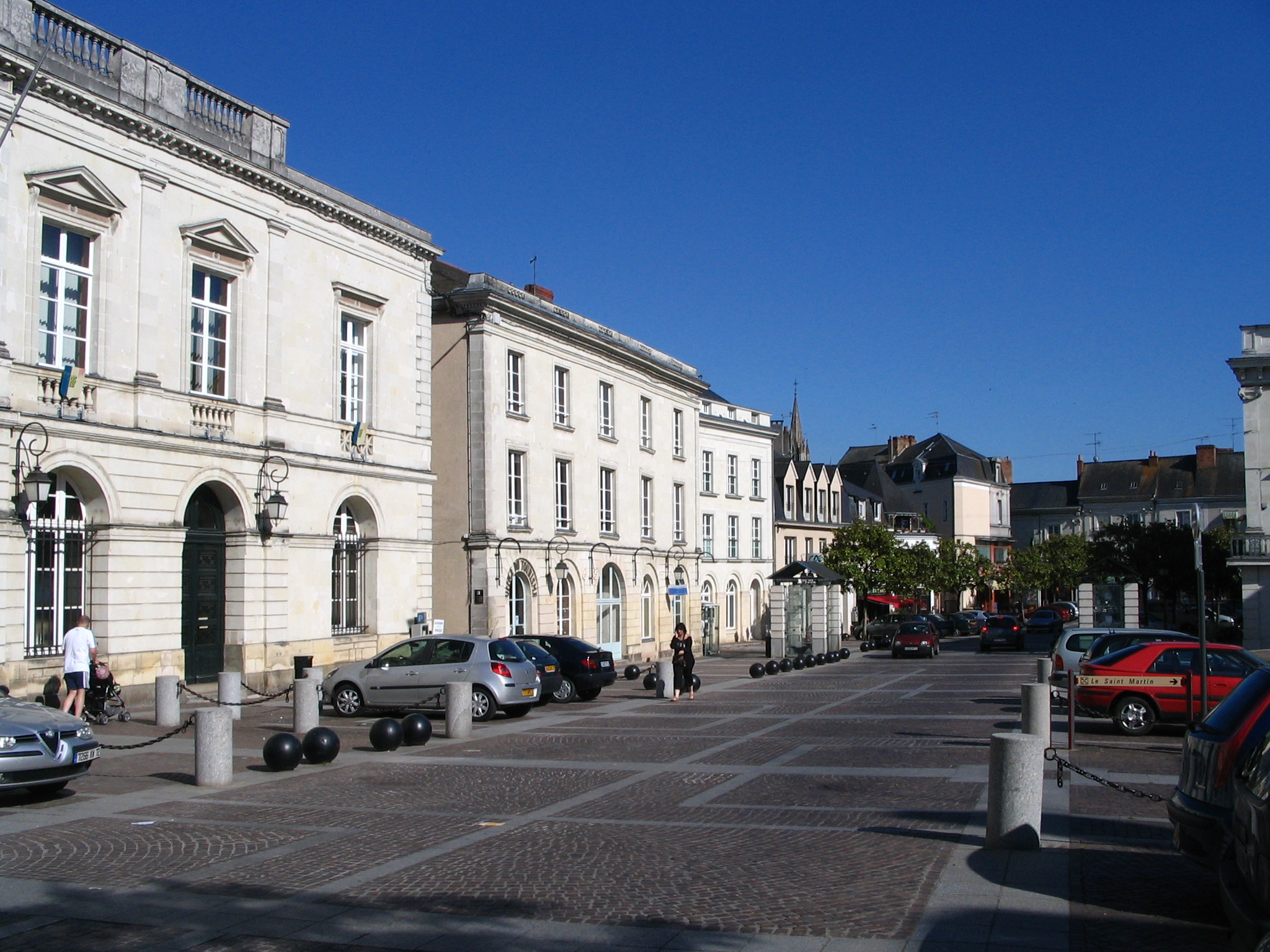
- The town hall of Sablé in Raphaël Élizé square.

- Coat of arms
- Location of Sablé-sur-Sarthe
- Location within France Location within Pays de la Loire
- Coordinates: 47°51′02″N 0°19′45″W
- Country: France
- Region: Pays de la Loire
- Department: Sarthe
- Arrondissement: La Flèche
- Canton: Sablé-sur-Sarthe
- Intercommunality: CC Pays Sabolien

Government
  - Mayor (2020–2026): Nicolas Leudière
- Area^{1}: 36.92 km^{2} (14.25 sq mi)
- Population (2023): 12,326
  - Density: 333.9/km^{2} (864.7/sq mi)
- Time zone: UTC+01:00 (CET)
  - Summer (DST): UTC+02:00 (CEST)
- INSEE/Postal code: 72264 /72300
- ^{1} French Land Register data, which excludes lakes, ponds, glaciers > 1 km^{2} (0.386 sq mi or 247 acres) and river estuaries.

Sablé-sur-Sarthe (French pronunciation: [sable syʁ saʁt], literally Sablé on Sarthe), commonly referred to as Sablé, is a commune in the Sarthe department, in the Pays de la Loire region, western France. It is about 40 km southwest of Le Mans and about 50 km northeast of Angers.

== Population ==
Historical population
Year	Pop.	±% p.a.
1968	9,227	—
1975	10,717	+2.16%
1982	11,773	+1.35%
1990	12,178	+0.42%
1999	12,716	+0.48%
2007	12,579	−0.14%
2012	12,510	−0.11%
2017	12,220	−0.47%
2023	12,326	+0.14%
Source: INSEE

== Geography ==
The Vaige forms part of the commune's north-western border, flows southwards through the middle of the commune, then flows into the Sarthe River in the town of Sablé-sur-Sarthe.

== History ==
French prime minister François Fillon was mayor of Sablé from 1983 to 2001, which therefore has a TGV station on the line from Paris-Nantes despite a relatively small population.

== Tourism ==
The town is a hub for river cruising along the Sarthe. There is a festival of baroque music every August.

== Industry ==
From 2010 to 2015, the motor car firm Venturi had a factory at Sablé-sur-Sarthe.

== Climate ==
Climate data for Sablé-sur-Sarthe (1981–2010 normals, extremes 1963–2022)
Month	Jan	Feb	Mar	Apr	May	Jun	Jul	Aug	Sep	Oct	Nov	Dec	Year
Record high °C (°F)	16.8 (62.2)	20.9 (69.6)	24.8 (76.6)	28.8 (83.8)	32.8 (91.0)	42.3 (108.1)	40.3 (104.5)	40.0 (104.0)	35.0 (95.0)	29.6 (85.3)	22.0 (71.6)	18.5 (65.3)	42.3 (108.1)
Mean daily maximum °C (°F)	8.0 (46.4)	8.9 (48.0)	12.4 (54.3)	15.2 (59.4)	19.1 (66.4)	22.7 (72.9)	25.0 (77.0)	25.0 (77.0)	21.6 (70.9)	16.7 (62.1)	11.2 (52.2)	8.2 (46.8)	16.2 (61.2)
Daily mean °C (°F)	4.9 (40.8)	5.2 (41.4)	7.8 (46.0)	10.0 (50.0)	13.8 (56.8)	16.9 (62.4)	19.0 (66.2)	18.9 (66.0)	15.9 (60.6)	12.4 (54.3)	7.7 (45.9)	5.2 (41.4)	11.5 (52.7)
Mean daily minimum °C (°F)	1.9 (35.4)	1.5 (34.7)	3.3 (37.9)	4.8 (40.6)	8.5 (47.3)	11.1 (52.0)	13.0 (55.4)	12.8 (55.0)	10.2 (50.4)	8.1 (46.6)	4.3 (39.7)	2.3 (36.1)	6.8 (44.2)
Record low °C (°F)	−19.0 (−2.2)	−14.0 (6.8)	−10.0 (14.0)	−5.0 (23.0)	−2.5 (27.5)	1.3 (34.3)	4.8 (40.6)	2.5 (36.5)	−0.1 (31.8)	−5.0 (23.0)	−10.0 (14.0)	−15.7 (3.7)	−19.0 (−2.2)
Average precipitation mm (inches)	70.1 (2.76)	53.7 (2.11)	54.5 (2.15)	55.9 (2.20)	60.6 (2.39)	45.5 (1.79)	53.0 (2.09)	41.8 (1.65)	53.6 (2.11)	73.9 (2.91)	69.3 (2.73)	74.4 (2.93)	706.3 (27.81)
Average precipitation days (≥ 1.0 mm)	12.1	9.4	10.4	10.1	10.4	7.2	7.4	6.9	7.7	11.4	10.9	12.5	116.4
Source: Meteociel

== Points of interest ==
- Arboretum du Rosay

== See also ==
- Communes of the Sarthe department
- Sablé-sur-Sarthe hostage crisis
