= Pincé =

- Commune
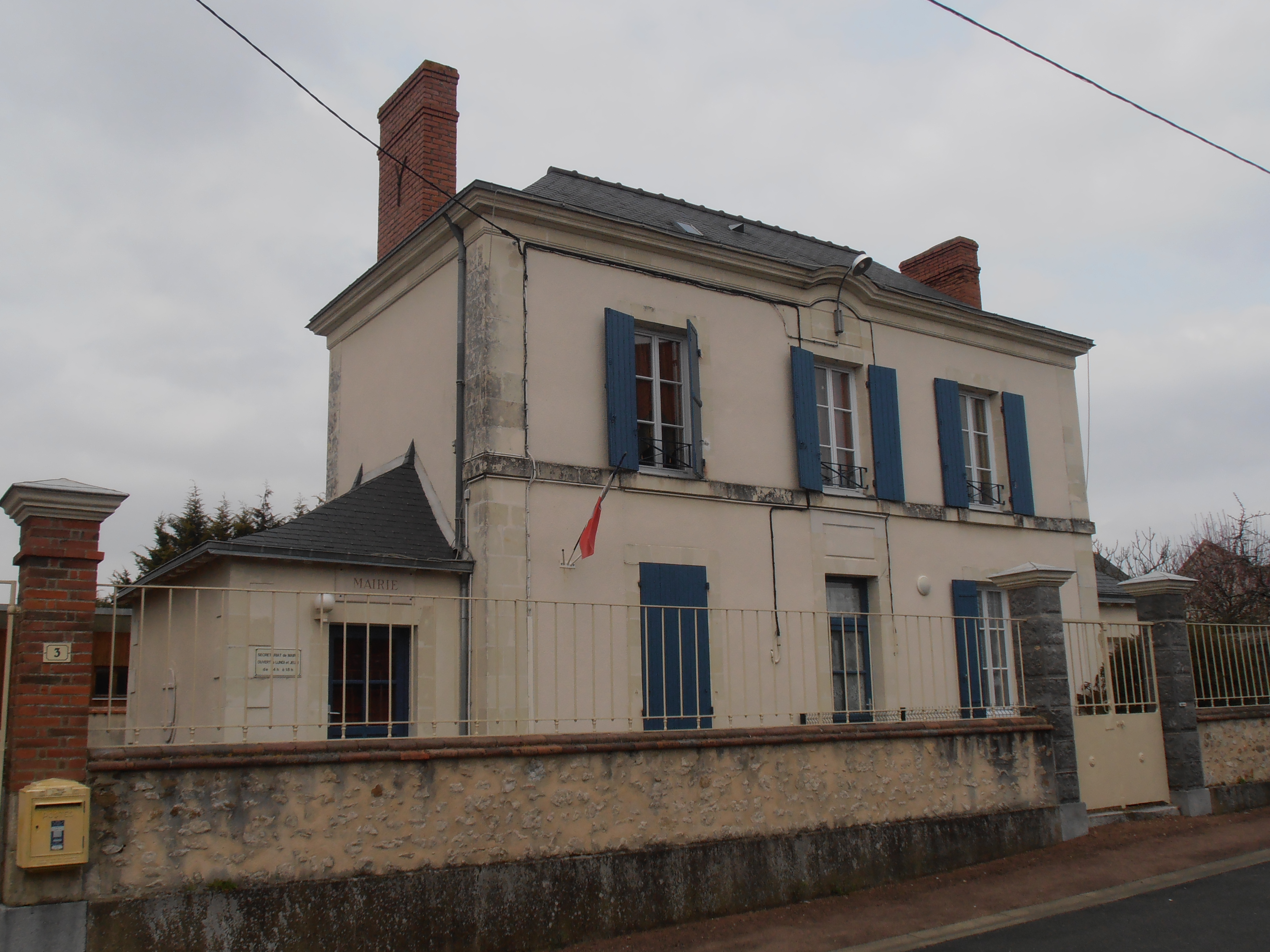
- The town hall of Pincé
- Location of Pincé
- Location within France Location within Pays de la Loire
- Coordinates: 47°47′52″N 0°22′55″W
- Country: France
- Region: Pays de la Loire
- Department: Sarthe
- Arrondissement: La Flèche
- Canton: Sablé-sur-Sarthe
- Intercommunality: CC Pays Sabolien

Government
  - Mayor (2020–2026): Nicole Foucault
- Area^{1}: 5.76 km^{2} (2.22 sq mi)
- Highest elevation: 53 m (174 ft)
- Lowest elevation: 21 m (69 ft)
- Population (2023): 192
  - Density: 33.3/km^{2} (86.3/sq mi)
- Demonym(s): Pincéen, Pincéenne
- Time zone: UTC+01:00 (CET)
  - Summer (DST): UTC+02:00 (CEST)
- INSEE/Postal code: 72236 /72300
- ^{1} French Land Register data, which excludes lakes, ponds, glaciers > 1 km^{2} (0.386 sq mi or 247 acres) and river estuaries.

Pincé (French pronunciation: [pɛ̃se]) is a commune in the Sarthe department in the region of Pays de la Loire in north-western France.

== See also ==
- Communes of the Sarthe department
