= Canton of Sablé-sur-Sarthe =

Coordinates: 47.84°N 0.33°W

The canton of Sablé-sur-Sarthe is an administrative division of the Sarthe department, northwestern France. Its borders were modified at the French canton reorganisation which came into effect in March 2015. Its seat is in Sablé-sur-Sarthe.

It consists of the following communes:

1. Asnières-sur-Vègre
2. Auvers-le-Hamon
3. Avoise
4. Le Bailleul
5. Courtillers
6. Dureil
7. Juigné-sur-Sarthe
8. Louailles
9. Parcé-sur-Sarthe
10. Notre-Dame-du-Pé
11. Pincé
12. Précigné
13. Sablé-sur-Sarthe
14. Solesmes
15. Souvigné-sur-Sarthe
16. Vion
