= Louailles =

- Commune
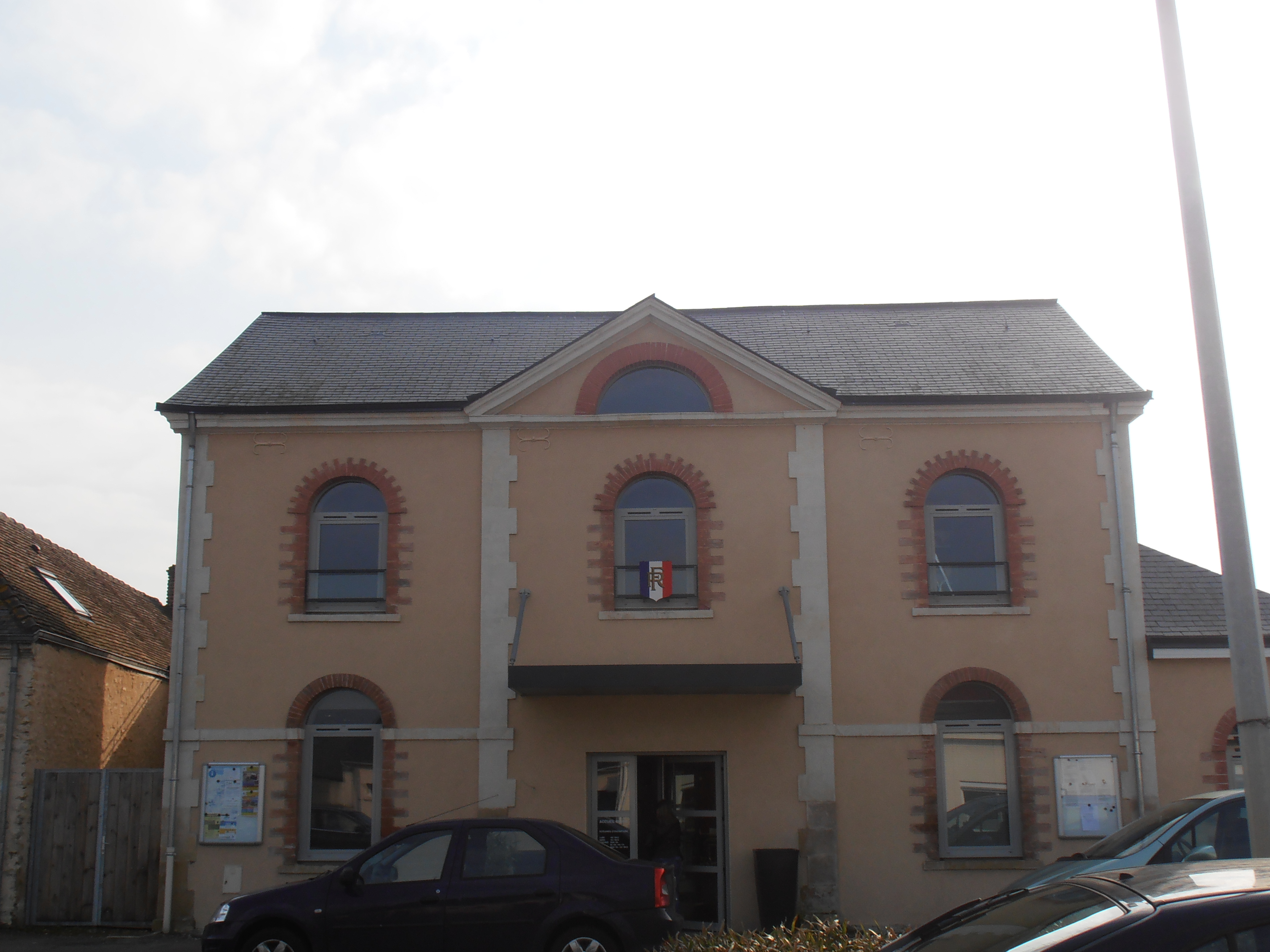
- The town hall of Louailles
- Location of Louailles
- Location within France Location within Pays de la Loire
- Coordinates: 47°47′31″N 0°15′05″W
- Country: France
- Region: Pays de la Loire
- Department: Sarthe
- Arrondissement: La Flèche
- Canton: Sablé-sur-Sarthe
- Intercommunality: CC Pays Sabolien

Government
  - Mayor (2020–2026): Martine Crnkovic
- Area^{1}: 10.49 km^{2} (4.05 sq mi)
- Elevation: 42 m (138 ft)
- Population (2023): 691
  - Density: 65.9/km^{2} (171/sq mi)
- Demonym(s): Louaillain, Louaillaine
- Time zone: UTC+01:00 (CET)
  - Summer (DST): UTC+02:00 (CEST)
- INSEE/Postal code: 72167 /72300
- ^{1} French Land Register data, which excludes lakes, ponds, glaciers > 1 km^{2} (0.386 sq mi or 247 acres) and river estuaries.

Louailles (French pronunciation: [lwaj]) is a commune in the Sarthe department in the region of Pays de la Loire in north-western France.

== See also ==
- Communes of the Sarthe department
