= Neuvy-en-Champagne =

Commune in Sarthe, France

- Part of Bernay-Neuvy-en-Champagne
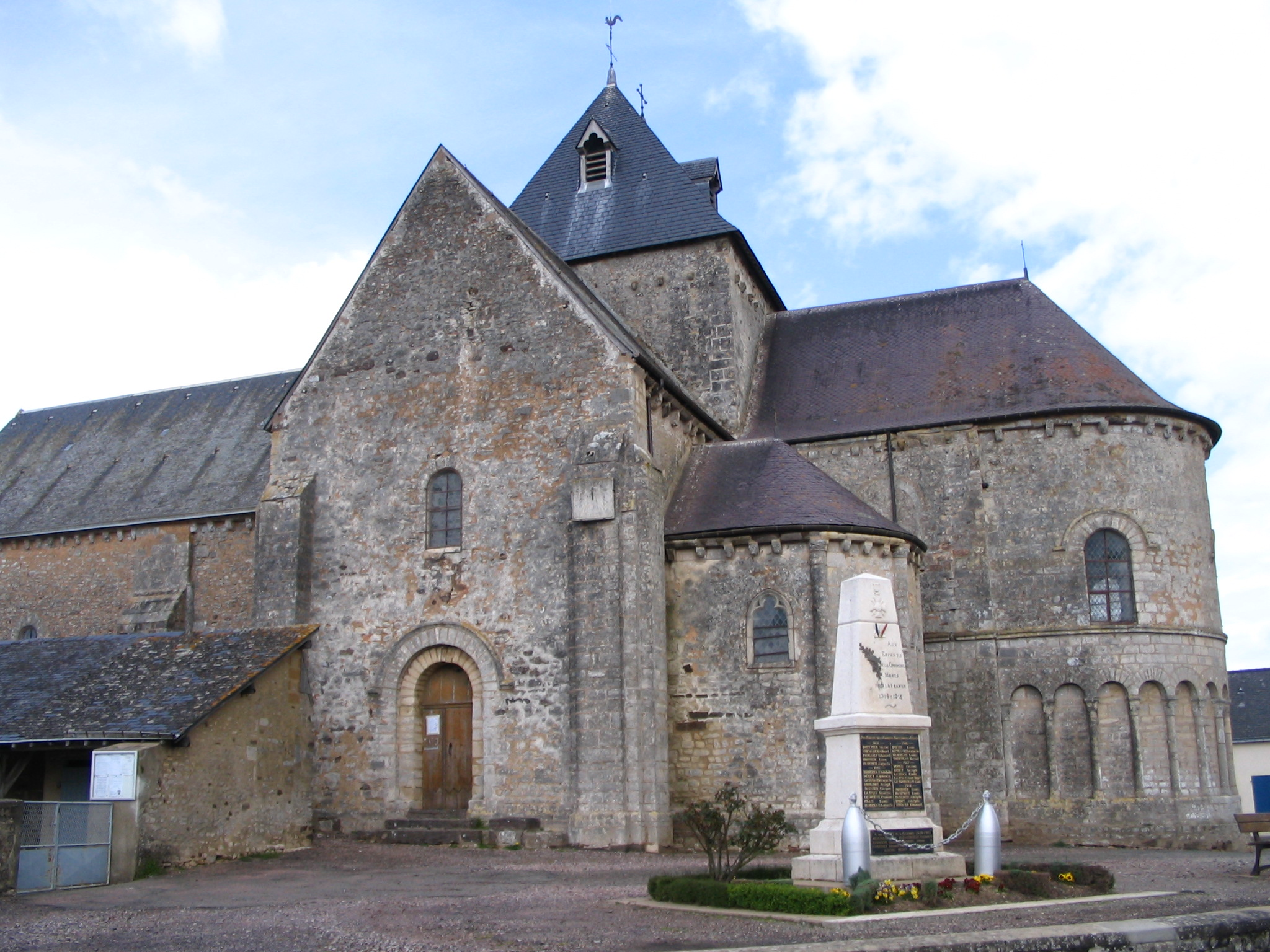
- The church of Neuvy-en-Champagne
- Location of Neuvy-en-Champagne
- Location within France Location within Pays de la Loire
- Coordinates: 48°04′55″N 0°02′21″W
- Country: France
- Region: Pays de la Loire
- Department: Sarthe
- Arrondissement: Mamers
- Canton: Loué
- Commune: Bernay-Neuvy-en-Champagne
- Area^{1}: 14.9 km^{2} (5.8 sq mi)
- Population (2016): 370
  - Density: 25/km^{2} (64/sq mi)
- Time zone: UTC+01:00 (CET)
  - Summer (DST): UTC+02:00 (CEST)
- Postal code: 72240
- ^{1} French Land Register data, which excludes lakes, ponds, glaciers > 1 km^{2} (0.386 sq mi or 247 acres) and river estuaries.

Neuvy-en-Champagne (French pronunciation: [nøvi ɑ̃ ʃɑ̃paɲ]) is a former commune in the Sarthe department in the region of Pays de la Loire in north-western France. On 1 January 2019, it was merged into the new commune Bernay-Neuvy-en-Champagne.

== Geography ==
The river Vègre forms part of the commune's western border. The village lies on the right bank of the Neuvy, a tributary of the Vègre.

== See also ==
- Communes of the Sarthe department
