= Chéméré =

- Part of Chaumes-en-Retz
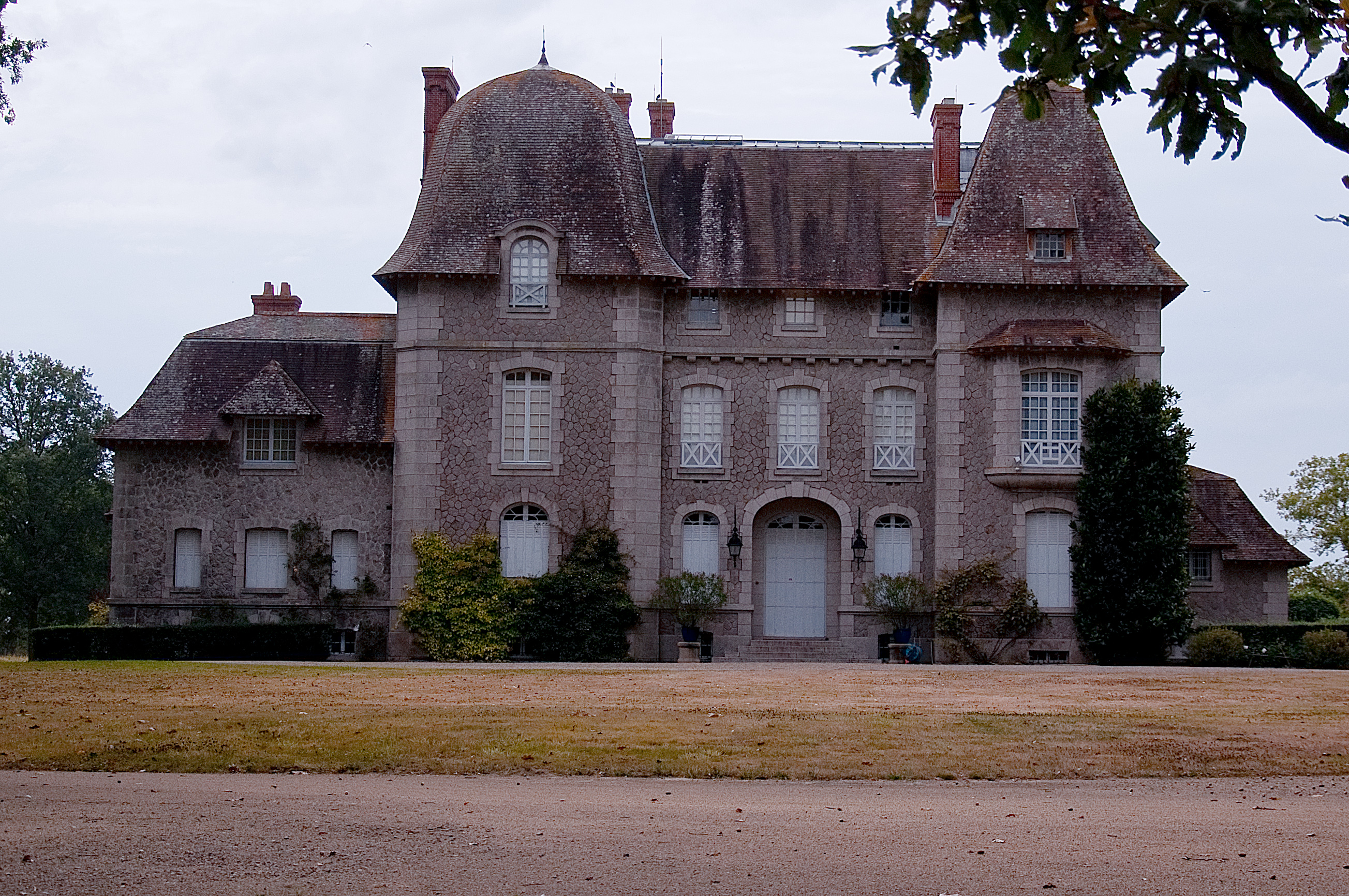
- The Château du Bois-Rouaud, in Chéméré

- Coat of arms
- Location of Chéméré
- Location within France Location within Pays de la Loire
- Coordinates: 47°07′22″N 1°54′49″W
- Country: France
- Region: Pays de la Loire
- Department: Loire-Atlantique
- Arrondissement: Saint-Nazaire
- Canton: Machecoul-Saint-Même
- Commune: Chaumes-en-Retz
- Area^{1}: 37.31 km^{2} (14.41 sq mi)
- Highest elevation: 60 m (200 ft)
- Lowest elevation: 2 m (6.6 ft)
- Population (2022): 2,791
  - Density: 74.81/km^{2} (193.7/sq mi)
- Demonym(s): Chéméréennes, Cheméréens
- Time zone: UTC+01:00 (CET)
  - Summer (DST): UTC+02:00 (CEST)
- Postal code: 44680
- Website: www.chemere.fr
- ^{1} French Land Register data, which excludes lakes, ponds, glaciers > 1 km^{2} (0.386 sq mi or 247 acres) and river estuaries.

Chéméré (French pronunciation: [ʃemeʁe]; Breton: Keverieg) is a former commune in the Loire-Atlantique department in western France. On 1 January 2016, it was merged into the new commune of Chaumes-en-Retz.

== See also ==
- Communes of the Loire-Atlantique department
