= Poillé-sur-Vègre =

- Commune
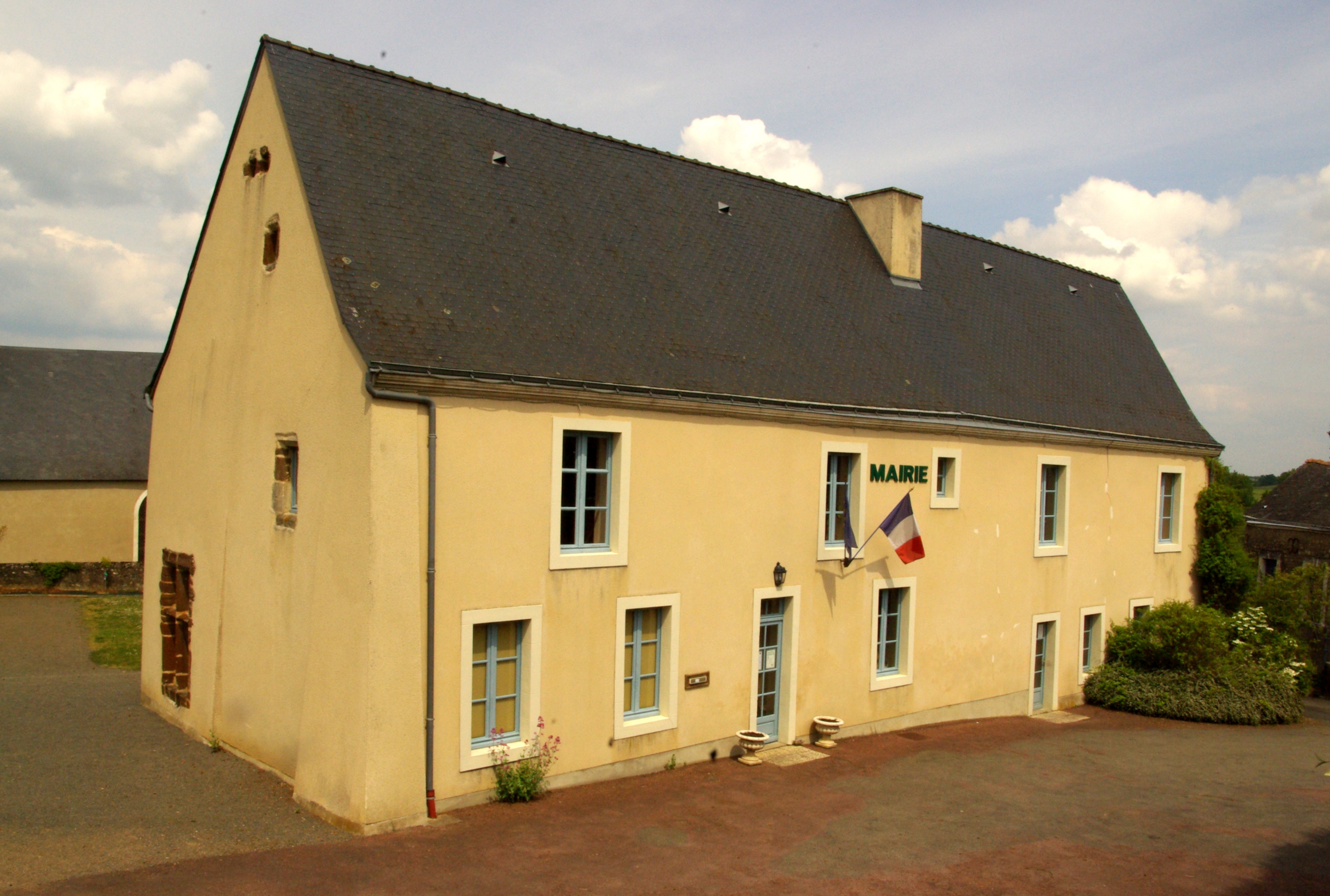
- The town hall of Poillé-sur-Vègre
- Location of Poillé-sur-Vègre
- Location within France Location within Pays de la Loire
- Coordinates: 47°55′15″N 0°15′46″W
- Country: France
- Region: Pays de la Loire
- Department: Sarthe
- Arrondissement: La Flèche
- Canton: Loué
- Intercommunality: Loué-Brûlon-Noyen

Government
  - Mayor (2020–2026): Maurice Duluard
- Area^{1}: 17.57 km^{2} (6.78 sq mi)
- Highest elevation: 96 m (315 ft)
- Lowest elevation: 38 m (125 ft)
- Population (2023): 582
  - Density: 33.1/km^{2} (85.8/sq mi)
- Demonym(s): Poilléen, Poilléenne
- Time zone: UTC+01:00 (CET)
  - Summer (DST): UTC+02:00 (CEST)
- INSEE/Postal code: 72239 /72350
- ^{1} French Land Register data, which excludes lakes, ponds, glaciers > 1 km^{2} (0.386 sq mi or 247 acres) and river estuaries.

Poillé-sur-Vègre is a commune in the Sarthe department in the region of Pays de la Loire in north-western France.

== Geography ==
The village lies in the middle of the commune, on the right bank of the Vègre, which forms part of the commune's north-eastern and south-eastern borders.

== See also ==
- Communes of the Sarthe department
