= Juigné-sur-Sarthe =

- Commune
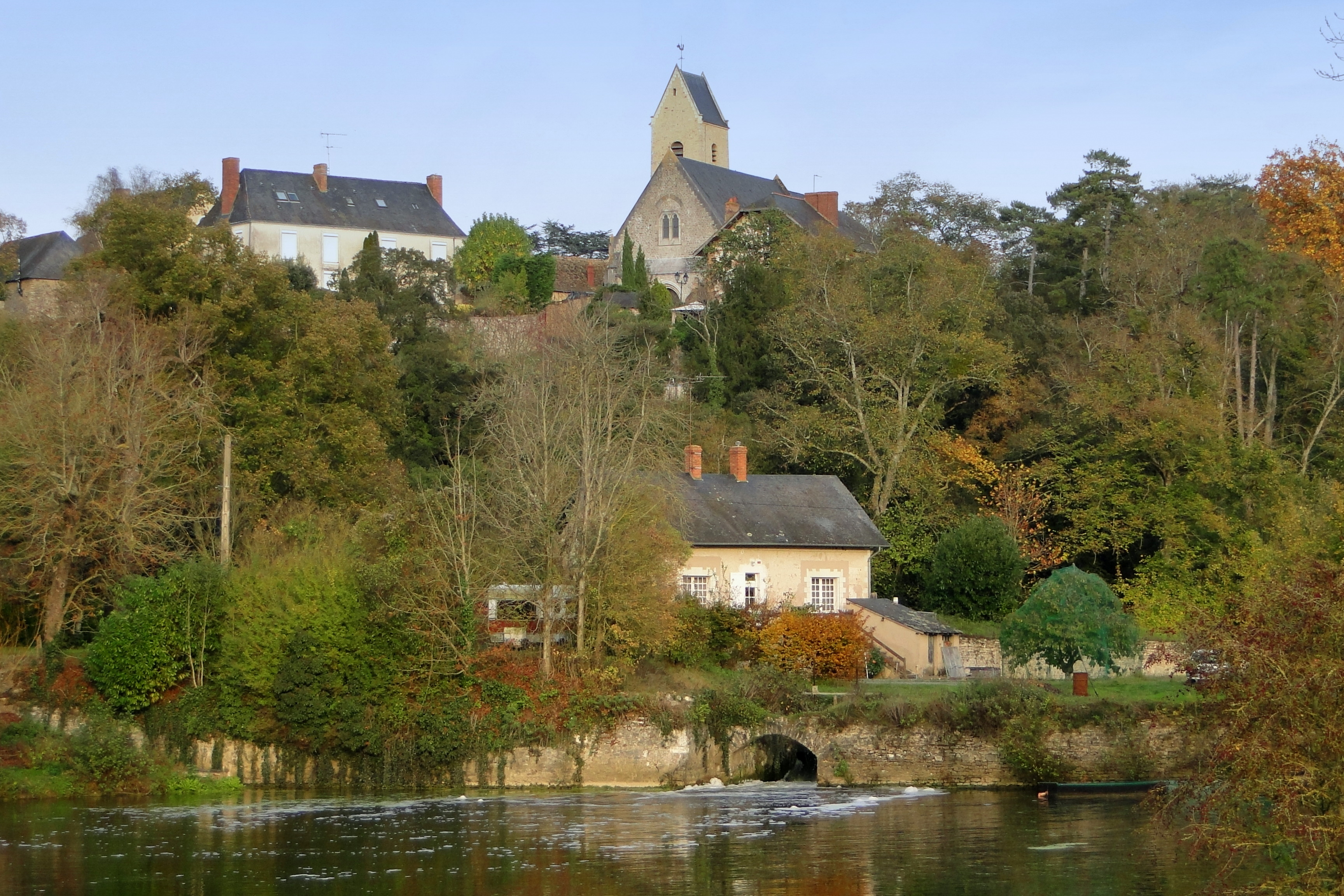
- A general view of Juigné-sur-Sarthe
- Location of Juigné-sur-Sarthe
- Location within France Location within Pays de la Loire
- Coordinates: 47°51′45″N 0°17′11″W
- Country: France
- Region: Pays de la Loire
- Department: Sarthe
- Arrondissement: La Flèche
- Canton: Sablé-sur-Sarthe
- Intercommunality: CC Pays Sabolien

Government
  - Mayor (2020–2026): Daniel Chevalier
- Area^{1}: 20.5 km^{2} (7.9 sq mi)
- Highest elevation: 50 m (160 ft)
- Population (2023): 1,141
  - Density: 55.7/km^{2} (144/sq mi)
- Demonym(s): Juignéen, Juignéenne
- Time zone: UTC+01:00 (CET)
  - Summer (DST): UTC+02:00 (CEST)
- INSEE/Postal code: 72151 /72300
- ^{1} French Land Register data, which excludes lakes, ponds, glaciers > 1 km^{2} (0.386 sq mi or 247 acres) and river estuaries.

Juigné-sur-Sarthe (French pronunciation: [ʒɥiɲe syʁ saʁt], literally Juigné on Sarthe) is a commune in the Sarthe department in the region of Pays de la Loire in north-western France.

== Monuments ==
- Manoir de Vrigné
- Château de Juigné

== See also ==
- Communes of the Sarthe department
