= Lavernat =

- Commune
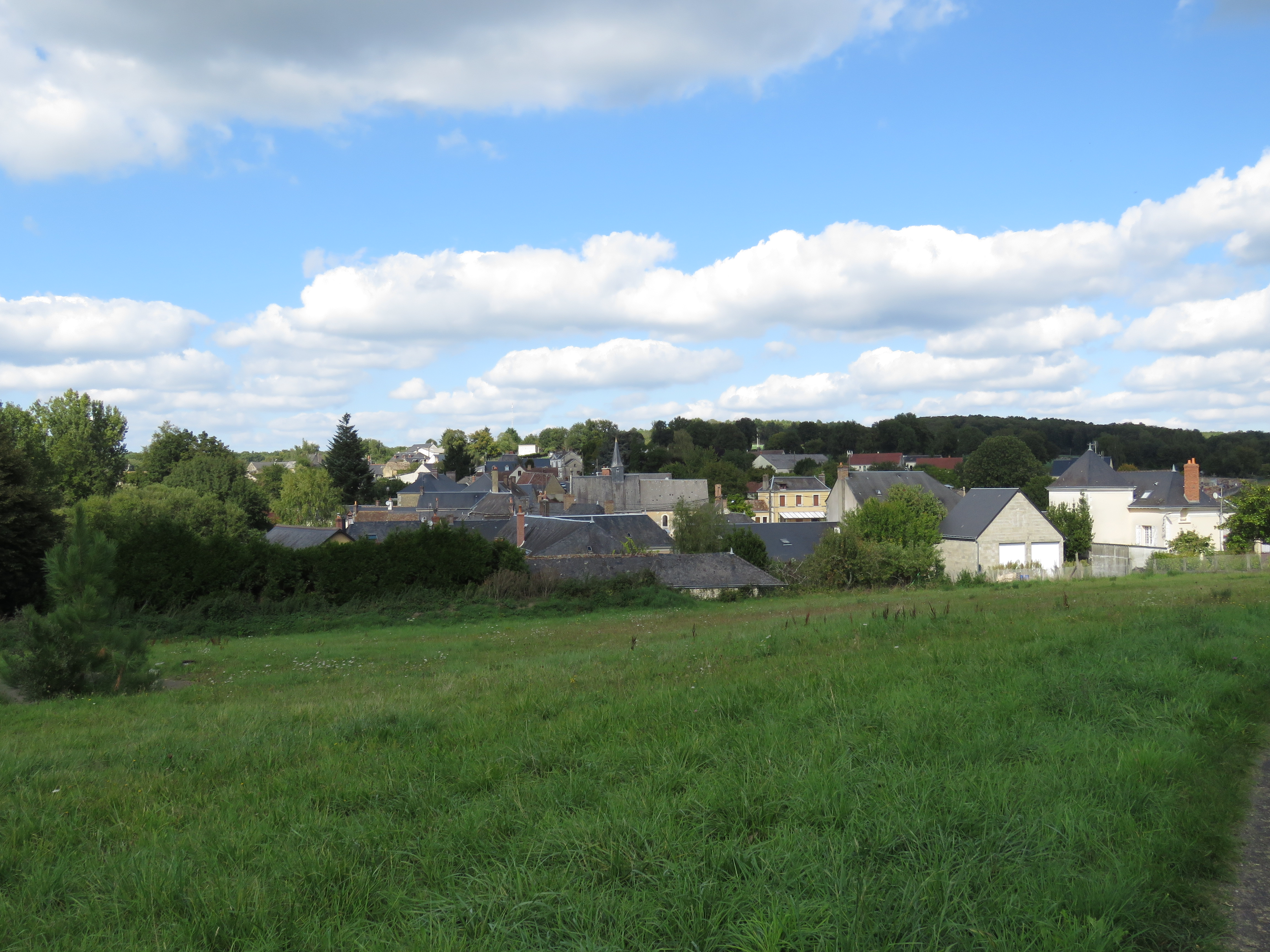
- A view in Lavernat
- Location of Lavernat
- Location within France Location within Pays de la Loire
- Coordinates: 47°43′02″N 0°20′00″E
- Country: France
- Region: Pays de la Loire
- Department: Sarthe
- Arrondissement: La Flèche
- Canton: Montval-sur-Loir
- Intercommunality: Loir-Lucé-Bercé

Government
  - Mayor (2020–2026): Alain Morancais
- Area^{1}: 22.9 km^{2} (8.8 sq mi)
- Population (2023): 586
  - Density: 25.6/km^{2} (66.3/sq mi)
- Demonym(s): Lavernais, Lavernaise
- Time zone: UTC+01:00 (CET)
  - Summer (DST): UTC+02:00 (CEST)
- INSEE/Postal code: 72160 /72500
- ^{1} French Land Register data, which excludes lakes, ponds, glaciers > 1 km^{2} (0.386 sq mi or 247 acres) and river estuaries.

Lavernat (French pronunciation: [lavɛʁna]) is a commune in the Sarthe department in the region of Pays de la Loire in north-western France.

== Geography ==
Lavernat is a commune in the southern part of the Sarthe department, located in the Haut-Maine region (specifically the "Maine blanc"), 37 kilometres (23 mi) south of Le Mans and 50 kilometres (31 mi) north of Tours.

=== Neighbouring communes ===
The neighbouring communes are:

- North-East: Beaumont-Pied-de-Bœuf
- East: Luceau
- South-East: Montabon
- South: Vaas
- West: Verneil-le-Chétif
- North-West: Mayet

=== Climate ===
Several studies have been conducted to characterize the climatic conditions across mainland France. In 2010, the climate of the commune was classified as a degraded oceanic climate of the Central and Northern plains according to a study by the Centre national de la recherche scientifique (CNRS) based on data covering the period 1971–2000. In 2020, the predominant climate was classified as Csb (Köppen climate classification), representing a warm-summer Mediterranean climate / temperate climate with a dry and fresh summer for the 1988–2017 period.

Furthermore, Météo-France places the commune in a transition zone between oceanic and altered oceanic climates, within the "Moyenne vallée de la Loire" climatic region, characterized by good sunshine hours (1,850 hours/year) and relatively dry summers. For the 1971–2000 period, the average annual temperature was 11.1 °C (52.0 °F), with an annual temperature range of 15 °C. The average annual rainfall total was 755 millimetres (29.7 in). For the 1991–2020 period, the nearest standard meteorological station, located 16 kilometres (10 mi) away in Saint-Christophe-sur-le-Nais, recorded an annual average temperature of 12.1 °C (53.8 °F) and an annual rainfall total of 682.2 millimetres (26.9 in).

== Urbanism ==
=== Typology ===
As of January 2024, Lavernat is categorized as a rural commune with dispersed habitat under the communal density grid defined by INSEE. It is located outside of any urban unit. However, the commune forms part of the multi-commune catchment area (aire d'attraction) of Montval-sur-Loir, which includes 12 communes and is categorized among areas with fewer than 50,000 inhabitants.

=== Land use ===
The land use of the commune, according to the Corine Land Cover (CLC) database, is dominated by agricultural land (52.4% in 2018, down from 53.8% in 1990). The detailed breakdown for 2018 is as follows: forests (42.3%), arable land (19.9%), meadows (19.8%), heterogeneous agricultural areas (11.5%), scrub or herbaceous vegetation areas (4%), urbanized zones (1.4%), and permanent cultures (1.1%).

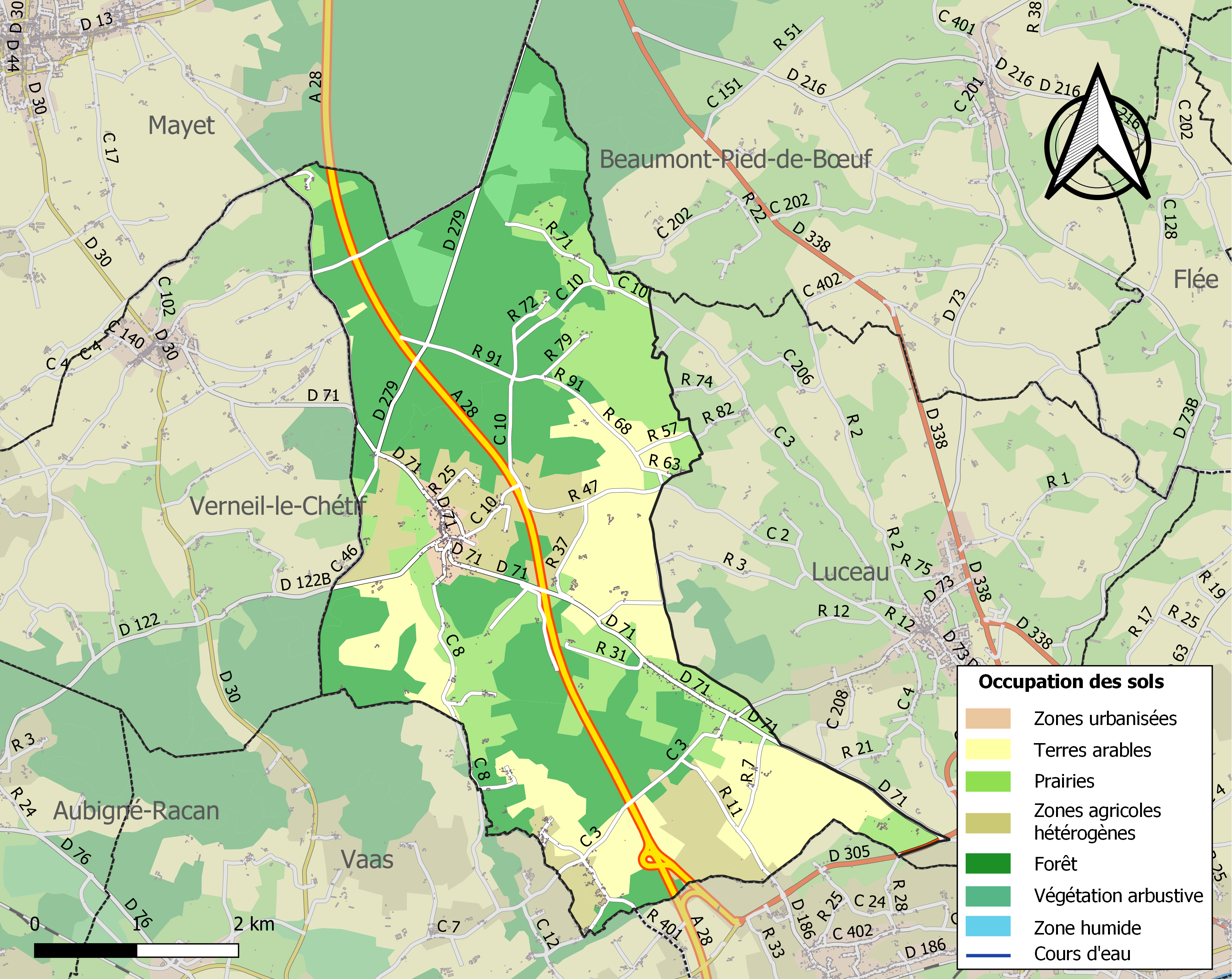
Map showing the infrastructure and land use of the commune in 2018 (CLC).

== See also ==
- Communes of the Sarthe department
