= Marçon =

- Commune
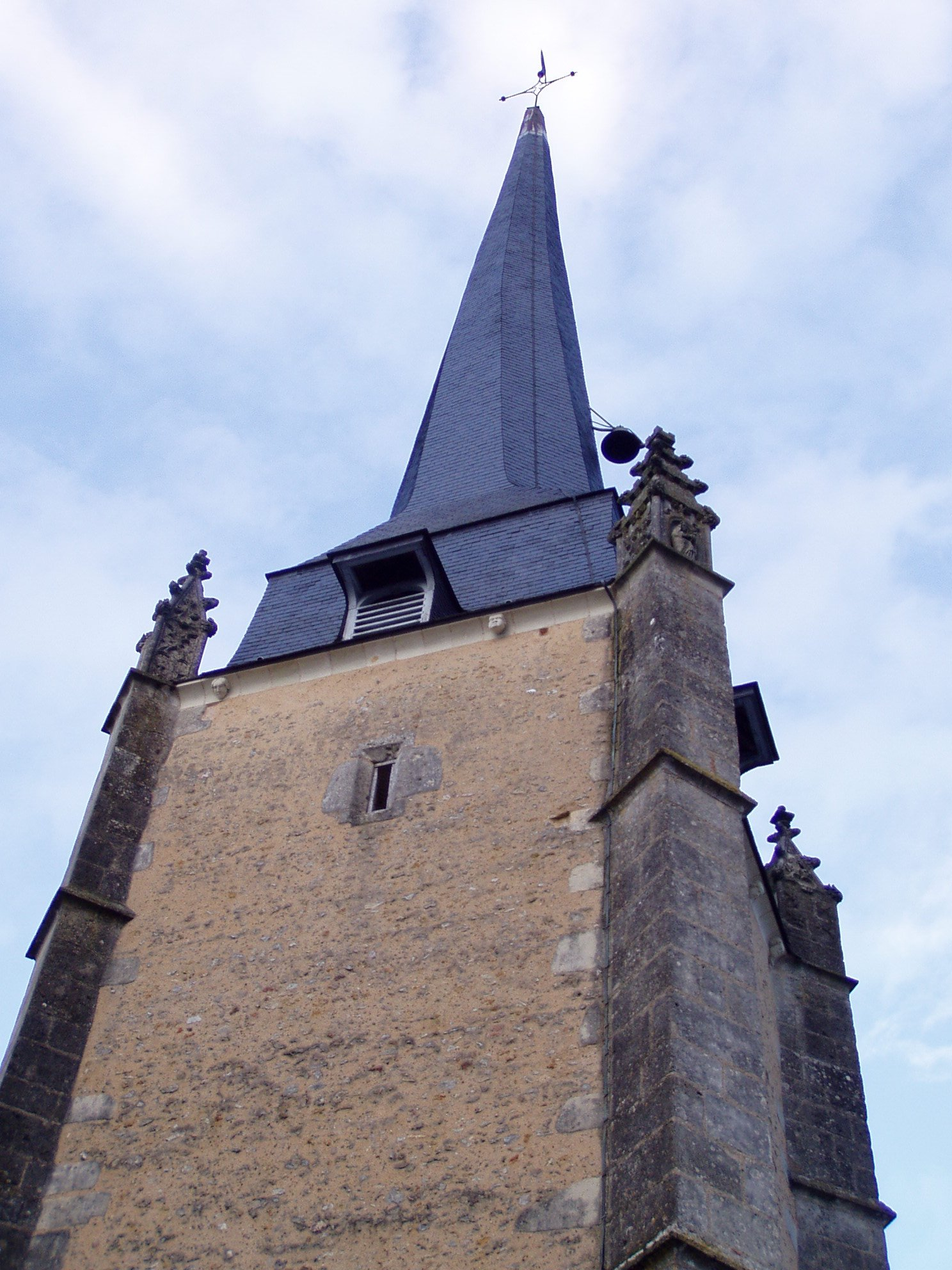
- The bell tower of the church of Notre-Dame
- Location of Marçon
- Location within France Location within Pays de la Loire
- Coordinates: 47°42′37″N 0°30′47″E
- Country: France
- Region: Pays de la Loire
- Department: Sarthe
- Arrondissement: La Flèche
- Canton: Montval-sur-Loir
- Intercommunality: Loir-Lucé-Bercé

Government
  - Mayor (2020–2026): Monique Trotin
- Area^{1}: 30.05 km^{2} (11.60 sq mi)
- Highest elevation: 133 m (436 ft)
- Lowest elevation: 47 m (154 ft)
- Population (2023): 1,057
  - Density: 35.17/km^{2} (91.10/sq mi)
- Demonym(s): Marçonnais, Marçonnaise
- Time zone: UTC+01:00 (CET)
  - Summer (DST): UTC+02:00 (CEST)
- INSEE/Postal code: 72183 /72340
- ^{1} French Land Register data, which excludes lakes, ponds, glaciers > 1 km^{2} (0.386 sq mi or 247 acres) and river estuaries.

Marçon (French pronunciation: [maʁsɔ̃]) is a commune in the Sarthe department in the region of Pays de la Loire in north-western France. It is also a minor, but well-liked wine-producing area.

== Geography ==
Marçon is a commune located in southern Sarthe in the Loir valley, between Château-du-Loir and La Chartre-sur-le-Loir on the departmental road N° 305. The climate is of a moderate nature and the farmland is fertile.

=== Towns bordering ===
- Beaumont-sur-Dême
- Chahaignes
- La Chartre-sur-le-Loir
- Lhomme
- Dissay-sous-Courcillon
- Flée
- Vouvray-sur-Loir

== History ==
It was occupied by Germany in World War II, but was not conquered by Germany in World War I.

=== Religious heritage ===
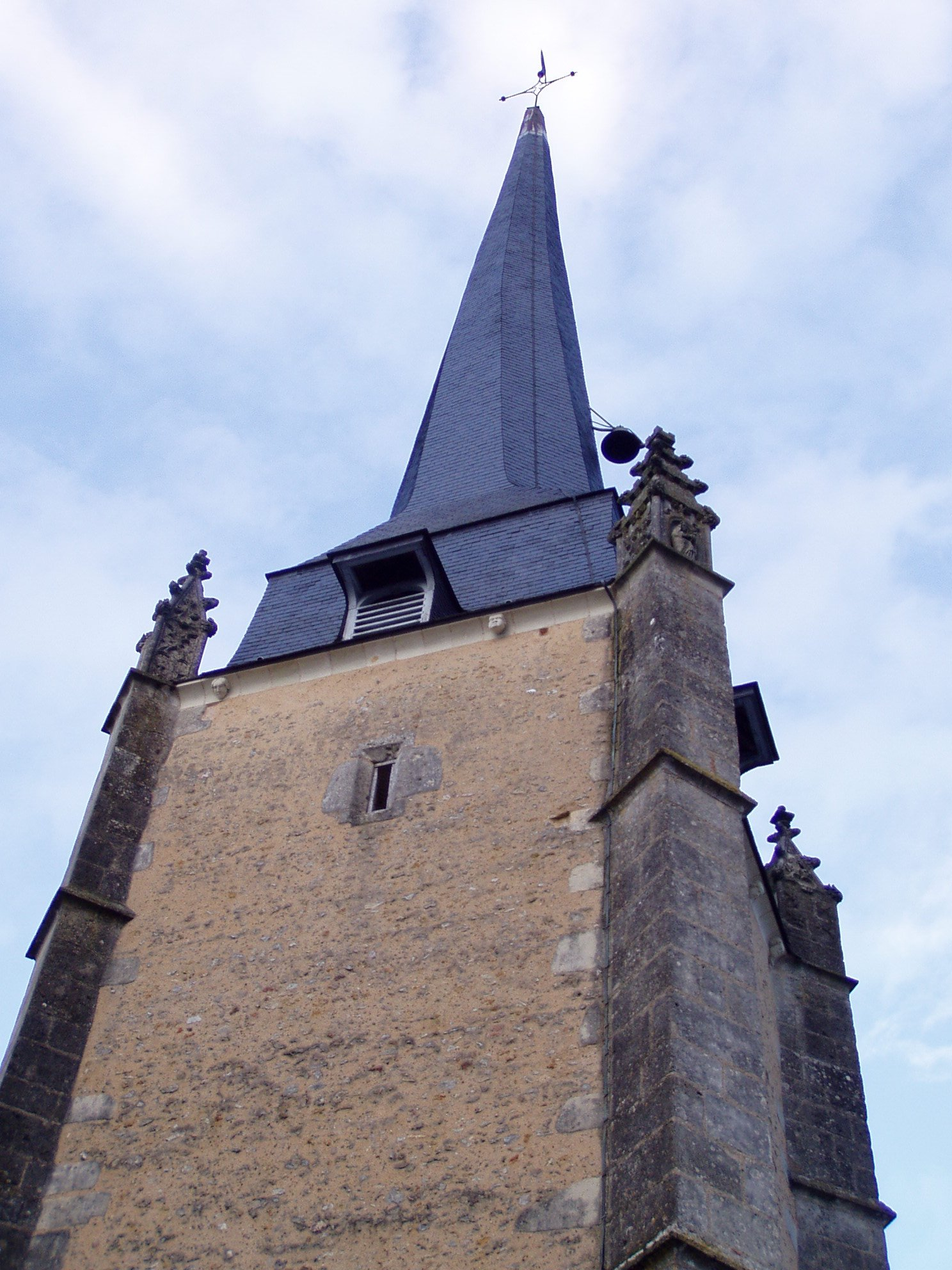
Steeple of the church

- Notre Dame, she was dedicated April 25, 1500 by the Archbishop of Tours, Bishop of Bénéhard. The tower is surmounted by a spire covered with slate that is slightly twisted, so that this church is listed as having a twisted tower. The angle turns 1 / 16 ^{th} from right to left.

=== Civil Heritage ===
The school dining room Le Corbusier: In 1957, the famous architect was contacted by the mayor at the time Mr Armand de Malherbe, drew with his colleague Andre Wogenscky, plans for the school canteen which subsequently opened in 1960.

== Economy ==
- Wines from Coteaux du Loir.

== Events ==
- May-Day sailing
- August: Concentration old vehicles and prestige

== See also ==
- Communes of the Sarthe department
