= Gérard Chasseguet =

French politician (1930–2025)

Deputy of the French National Assembly
- In office 2 April 1973 – 1 April 1993
- Preceded by: Jean-Yves Chapalain
- Succeeded by: Pierre Hellier
- Constituency: Sarthe's 1st constituency (1973–1986; 1988–1993); Proportional representation (1986–1988)

Mayor of Dissay-sous-Courcillon
- In office 2008–2014
- In office 1995–2001

Member of the General Council of Sarthe
- In office 1976–1988
- Preceded by: Ernest Chevreuil
- Succeeded by: Michel Quillet
- Constituency: Canton of Sillé-le-Guillaume

Personal details
- Born: 11 March 1930; La Chartre-sur-le-Loir, France
- Died: 10 July 2025 (aged 95)
- Political party: UDR; RPR

Gérard Chasseguet (11 March 1930 – 10 July 2025) was a French politician of the Union of Democrats for the Republic (UDR) and the Rally for the Republic (RPR).

A signatory of the Appel des 43 in support of Valéry Giscard d'Estaing in the 1974 presidential election, he served in the National Assembly from 1973 to 1993. He was also mayor of Dissay-sous-Courcillon from 1995 to 2001 and from 2008 to 2014 and represented the Canton of Sillé-le-Guillaume in the General Council of Sarthe from 1976 to 1988.

Chasseguet died on 10 July 2025, at the age of 95.
