= Vouvray-sur-Loir =

- Part of Montval-sur-Loir
- Location of Vouvray-sur-Loir
- Location within France Location within Pays de la Loire
- Coordinates: 47°41′50″N 0°27′48″E
- Country: France
- Region: Pays de la Loire
- Department: Sarthe
- Arrondissement: La Flèche
- Canton: Montval-sur-Loir
- Commune: Montval-sur-Loir
- Area^{1}: 8.1 km^{2} (3.1 sq mi)
- Population (2022): 764
  - Density: 94/km^{2} (240/sq mi)
- Time zone: UTC+01:00 (CET)
  - Summer (DST): UTC+02:00 (CEST)
- Postal code: 72500
- ^{1} French Land Register data, which excludes lakes, ponds, glaciers > 1 km^{2} (0.386 sq mi or 247 acres) and river estuaries.

Vouvray-sur-Loir (French pronunciation: [vuvʁɛ syʁ lwaʁ], literally Vouvray on Loir) is a former commune in the Sarthe department in the region of Pays de la Loire in north-western France. On 1 October 2016, it was merged into the new commune Montval-sur-Loir.

== See also ==
- Communes of the Sarthe department
