= Villaines-sous-Lucé =

- Commune
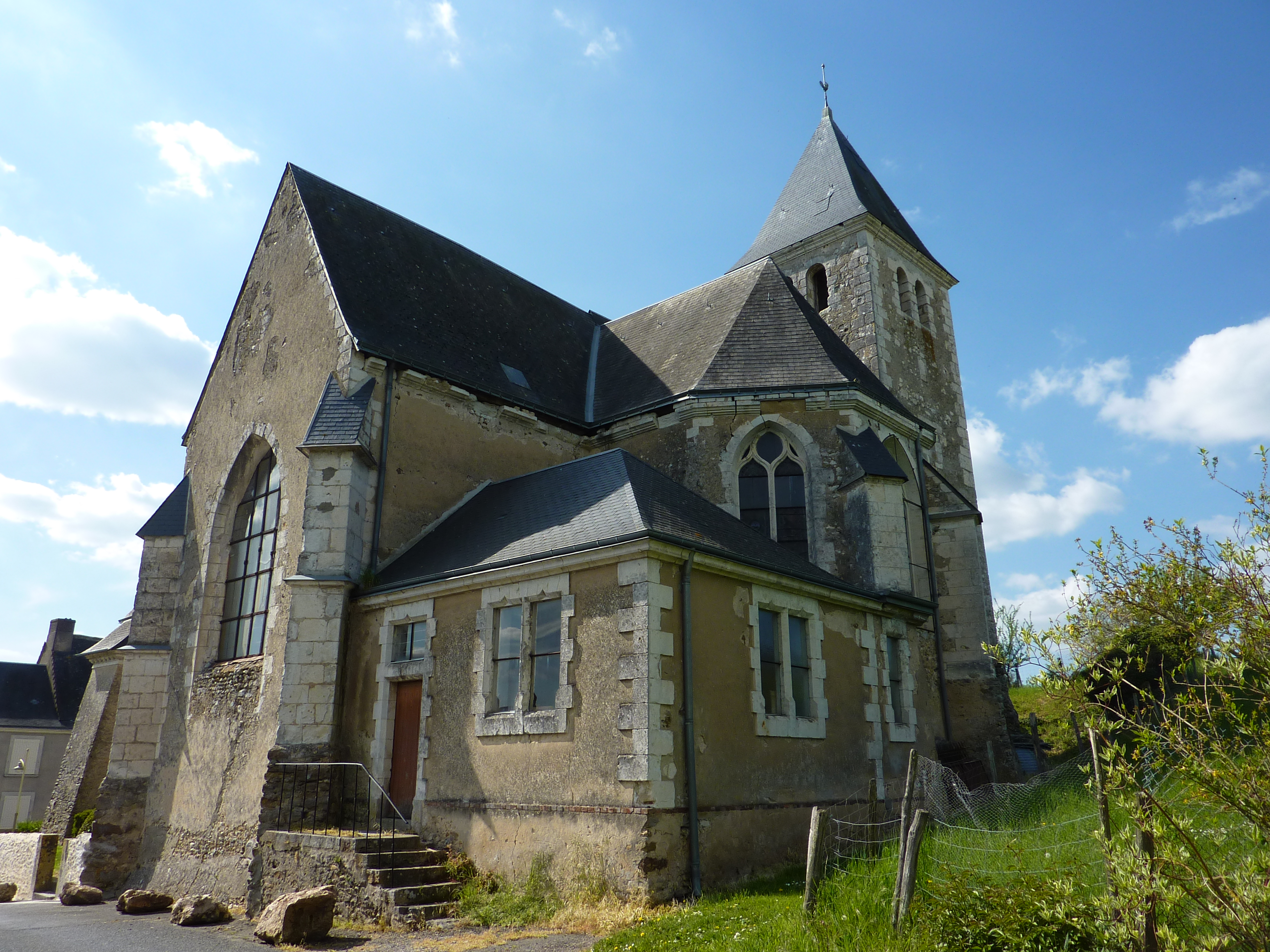
- The church of Notre-Dame, in Villaines-sous-Lucé
- Location of Villaines-sous-Lucé
- Location within France Location within Pays de la Loire
- Coordinates: 47°51′58″N 0°29′00″E
- Country: France
- Region: Pays de la Loire
- Department: Sarthe
- Arrondissement: La Flèche
- Canton: Montval-sur-Loir
- Intercommunality: Loir-Lucé-Bercé

Government
  - Mayor (2026–32): Agnès Verdier
- Area^{1}: 25.6 km^{2} (9.9 sq mi)
- Highest elevation: 163 m (535 ft)
- Lowest elevation: 82 m (269 ft)
- Population (2023): 645
  - Density: 25.2/km^{2} (65.3/sq mi)
- Time zone: UTC+01:00 (CET)
  - Summer (DST): UTC+02:00 (CEST)
- INSEE/Postal code: 72376 /72150
- ^{1} French Land Register data, which excludes lakes, ponds, glaciers > 1 km^{2} (0.386 sq mi or 247 acres) and river estuaries.

Villaines-sous-Lucé (French pronunciation: [vilɛn su lyse], literally Villaines under Lucé) is a commune in the Sarthe department in the region of Pays de la Loire in north-western France.

== Notable people born in Villaines-sous-Lucé ==
- Augustin-Joseph de Mailly (1707–1794), French aristocrat, royalist general and governor

== See also ==
- Communes of the Sarthe department
