= Montabon =

- Part of Montval-sur-Loir
- Coat of arms
- Location of Montabon
- Location within France Location within Pays de la Loire
- Coordinates: 47°40′50″N 0°23′11″E
- Country: France
- Region: Pays de la Loire
- Department: Sarthe
- Arrondissement: La Flèche
- Canton: Montval-sur-Loir
- Commune: Montval-sur-Loir
- Area^{1}: 7.6 km^{2} (2.9 sq mi)
- Population (2022): 678
  - Density: 89/km^{2} (230/sq mi)
- Demonym(s): Montabonais, Montabonaise
- Time zone: UTC+01:00 (CET)
  - Summer (DST): UTC+02:00 (CEST)
- Postal code: 72500
- ^{1} French Land Register data, which excludes lakes, ponds, glaciers > 1 km^{2} (0.386 sq mi or 247 acres) and river estuaries.

Montabon (French pronunciation: [mɔ̃tabɔ̃]) is a former commune in the Sarthe department in the region of Pays de la Loire in north-western France. On 1 October 2016, it was merged into the new commune Montval-sur-Loir.

== See also ==
- Communes of the Sarthe department
