= Paulette Sarcey =

French resistant (1924–2020)

- Sarcey in 1947
- Born: Paula Szlifke; 11 April 1924; Paris, France
- Died: 5 May 2020 (aged 96); Montreuil, Seine-Saint-Denis, France
- Occupation: French Resistance
- Spouse: Max Swiczarczyk (later Sarcey) (m. 1947)
- Children: 2

Paulette Sarcey (11 April 1924 – 5 May 2020) was a French resistant. She was a member of the French Resistance in World War II.

== Biography ==
Paulette Sarcey was born as Paula Szlifke on 11 April 1924 in Paris. Her family was of Polish-Jewish origin. Her father, Froïm (Efrayam) Szlifke, was a leather worker and communist activist. Her mother, Jenta ("Yentil") Przepiorka, worked in the clothing industry. The family fled antisemitism in Poland in 1923, arriving in France. They settled in Belleville, and Sarcey joined the communist circles in the area. She joined the Resistance in 1940 at the age of 16 alongside other communist youths, most notably Henri Krasucki.

Sarcey after capture by the police in 1943

She changed her name to Martine while in hiding, but was captured by police of the Vichy Regime on 23 March 1943 after a denunciation. Her final address was at 14 Rue de Vaucouleurs in the 11th arrondissement of Paris. She was taken to a small station of the Paris Police Prefecture, where she was harshly interrogated. She was first taken to Drancy internment camp, then to Auschwitz on 23 June 1943. Following the death marches, she was interned at Ravensbrück concentration camp, and shortly thereafter at Neustadt-Glewe, where she was liberated on 2 May 1945.

Back in France, Sarcey was reunited with her family, and began aiming at spreading awareness of the horrors of the camps. Her parents hid her in their Parisian workshop, while her brother, Robert, was hidden in a Catholic family in Chahaignes. Her father died in 1972, her mother in 1981, and her brother in 2019.

In 1947, Paulette married Max Swiczarczyk (later known as Max Sarcey; 1926-2003), two years her junior, also of Polish-Jewish descent and a former member of the French Resistance. He joined the FTP-MOI and after the roundup of 16 July 1942, was based in Lyon, where his goal was to join the Free French Forces. After a stint in Franco's jails in Spain, he arrived in England where he joined the special assault sections (Bataillons du Ciel). Max and his cousin, Joseph Dymenstein, were two of the youngest parachutists in France. Parachuted in June 1944 in Normandy, he participated in all the battles until the capture of Hitler's Eagle's Nest in Berchtesgaden.

The couple had two children, Michèle and Claude. The family lived in Montreuil. Max died in 2003 and Paulette Sarcey died on 5 May 2020 at the age of 96.

== Distinctions ==
- Knight of the Legion of Honour
- Médaille militaire
- Croix de Guerre 1939–1945

== Works ==
- Paula, survivre obstinément (2015)
