= Alfred Ubbelohde =

Belgian-born English physical chemist

- Born: Alfred René Jean Paul Ubbelohde; 14 December 1907; Antwerp, Belgium
- Died: 7 January 1988 (aged 80)
- Resting place: Etchingham, Sussex
- Education: University of Oxford
- Known for: Ubbelohde effect
- Awards: See list
- Scientific career
- Fields: Physical chemistry
- Workplaces: Queen's University Belfast; Imperial College London
- Doctoral students: Henrik Kacser

Alfred René Jean Paul Ubbelohde FRS (1907–1988) was a Belgian-born English physical chemist.

== Biography ==
Alfred Ubbelohde (usually known as Paul) was born in Antwerp on 14 December 1907, the third son of François Christian J. Ubbelohde, a merchant, and Angele (née Verspreeuwen). The family moved to England at the outbreak of the first world war. Paul contracted polio just a few months later, leaving him a stoop and a paralysed right arm. He was naturalized British in his mid-twenties.

Ubbelohde attended Colet Court school in Barnes, London from 1920, and then St Paul’s. He was interested in chemistry, pure mathematics and English literature. He chose chemistry and won a scholarship to Christ Church, Oxford from where he graduated with First Class Honours in 1930.

Ubbelohde spent five more years at Oxford, undertaking postgraduate research at the Clarendon with Sir Alfred Egerton, FRS. They published together on the occlusion of hydrogen by palladium. and the oxidation of hydrocarbons.

During his time at Oxford, Ubbelohde spent a year (1931–32) in the laboratory of Professor Arnold Eucken at the Institut für physikalische Chemie, Göttingen. During this time with he spent time with Max Born and was also able to go through “the entire Leiden glass-blowing course after working hours”.

In 1936, Paul Ubbelohde was awarded the Dewar Fellowship of the Royal Institution (RI), then under the direction of Sir William Bragg. Here he met many talented scientists, including Kathleen Lonsdale, John Monteath Robertson and Hermann Arthur Jahn. He often declared that “the most formative period of his scientific life was spent at the Royal Institution”. Another key contact at the RI was Sir Robert Robinson. In 1939, the Royal Arsenal was vulnerable to enemy attack, and so the Research Department was dispersed to University College, Swansea. Robertson (then aged 70) left the RI to take charge of it. Ubbelohde joined him in June 1940; He was Principal Experimental Officer in charge of a group working on the theory and practice of explosion and detonation.

In 1945, shortly after VE Day, Ubbohde’s war work came to an end, and he was appointed Professor of Chemistry at Queen's University Belfast. Here “he built up a vibrant department of physical chemistry. His own research included transport properties and the combustion of gaseous hydrocarbons; the diffusion, ultrasonic dispersion and viscosity of liquids; and the interaction of alkali metals with aromatic hydrocarbons. He also studied the intercalation of guest species by graphitic hosts”.

In 1954 Ubbelohde moved from Belfast to take up the position of Professor of Thermodynamics at Imperial College London, accompanied by a number of junior colleagues and students from Queen’s. In 1961 he became Head of Department, a post which he held until his retirement in 1975. During his time at Imperial Ubbelohde’s researches covered a wide range, including carbon, graphite and intercalation compounds; pyrolytic graphites; ionic melts; and detonation.

In his memoir on Ubbelohde Felix Weinberg stated that “Although a few friends were privileged to remain close to him from his youth and benefited from his kindness, Paul Ubbelohde remained a very private person throughout his life and many of his colleagues never felt quite at ease with him. ‘He was the one Governor (of St Paul’s School) whom I knew longest’ wrote the late Dr M A Grace, FRS, ‘but about whom I knew least. His conversation was wide-ranging - physics, food, wine, pigs, farming, art, etc., but rarely about people’”.

The Times obituary noted that:

Ubbelohde was a man of wide interests, gifted with the ability to absorb and retain volumes of written information. He was knowledgeable about antiques, accumulated a remarkable collection of Chinese ceramics and was a great connoisseur of wine — an interest from which the College benefitted greatly during the years when he was Chairman of its Wine Committee.

He was also a salmon fisherman and an enthusiastic farmer who often held forth in College common rooms on the virtues of pigs.

Paul Ubbelohde was a wise and most erudite man.

== Awards and honours ==
- The Dewar Fellowship of the Royal Institution in 1936
- DSc by Oxford University Ubbelohde in 1941
- Fellow of the Royal Institute of Chemistry (FRIC) in 1946
- Fellow of the Royal Society in 1951
- Fellow of the Institute of Physics (FInstP) in 1957
- Appointed CBE in 1961
- Academician of the Pontifical Academy of Sciences in 1968
- The Combustion Institute’s Alfred C. Egerton Gold Medal in 1970
- The Messel Medal (the premier award of the Society of Chemical Industry) in 1972
- Honorary DSc by Queen’s University Belfast 1972
- The George Skakel Memorial Award of the American Carbon Society in 1975
- The Paul Lebeau Gold Medal of the Société des Hautes Temperatures et Réfractaires in 1975
- Honorary Degrees from the Universities of Padua, Nancy and the Université Libre of Brussels
- Honorary Fellow of the City and Guilds Institute
- Freeman of the City of London

== Publications ==
- An Introduction to Modern Thermodynamical Principles. Oxford: Clarendon Press, 1937
- Time and Thermodynamics. London: Oxford University Press, 1947
- Man and Energy ... Illustrated. London: Hutchinson's Scientific & Technical Publications, 1954
- Melting and Crystal Structure. Oxford: Clarendon Press, 1955
- Thermodynamics in the World of To-day, etc. London: 1955
- Graphite and its Crystal Compounds (with F A Lewis) Oxford: Clarendon Press, 1960
- The Molten State of Matter: Melting and Crystal Structure. Chichester; New York: Wiley, 1979

=== Miss Georgina Greene ===
When Paul Ubbelohde became established as Head of Department at Imperial College he advertised for a departmental secretary. He needed “a secretary or personal assistant who firmly controls access and rations unexpected intrusions. Miss Georgina Greene acquired world-wide renown for her effectiveness in that role during Ubbelohde’s period at Imperial College. One scientist who knew her reported that “Ubbelohde’s dazzling and formidable secretary Georgina Greene became a dominating influence in the Department. Georgina had a two-way mirror connecting her office with that of Ubbelohde and vetted all those who wanted to speak to the head of Department”. Gay notes that "She wielded power over the staff and was understandably resented".

Some years earlier, Miss Greene was involved in an unfortunate episode. In February 1957 Lord Worsley (John Edward Pelham, the 7th Earl of Yarborough) announced his forthcoming marriage to Georgina,“secretary to a professor in London”. Less than two months later it was announced, without explanation, that the marriage would not now take place. On 12 December of that year Lord Worsley married Florence Ann Petronel Duffin (née Upton) at Caxton Hall.

Greene was born in Abbeyleix, Ireland in 1925. She was given considerable responsibility while working for Ubbelohde. She worked with Dudley Maurice Newitt on the design and decoration of the Senior Common Room in the Roderick Hill building. She also recollected that “Professor Ubbelohde required a large house, not least ‘to keep all his books in’. The 17th century Platts Farm nestles in the beautiful rolling Sussex countryside with Rudyard Kipling’s house just visible on the horizon. [She] was left to bid for the farm during one of Professor Ubbelohde’s absences in South America and was so confident of his approval that she exceeded the previously agreed maximum by a generous margin”.

Paul Ubbelohde obviously thought so highly of Georgina Green that he left her all his silver plate, his car and £20,000. She in turn left in her will to “The Worshipful Company of Mercers for the Ubbelohde Fund in appreciation of the life of H. E. Professor A R J P Ubbelohde CBE FRS the sum of £30,000”.

Miss Georgina Mary Greene died on 9 April 2015 at the White Lodge Care Home in Braydon, Wiltshire; she left an estate with a net worth of £1,480,000. Georgina was buried, as directed in her will, at the church of the Blessed Mary and St Nicholas in Etchingham, Sussex. She is in an unmarked grave to the right of that of her former employer, Professor Ubbelohde, placed there at her request. "Georgina Greene is remembered in Etchingham for her very generous donation to the Church ... It allowed us to redecorate the interior of our beautiful Grade I listed building".

=== Ubbelohde Fund ===
The Fund (more properly, the Ubbelohde Bequest) was left to the Company by Professor Ubbelohde under his will. The Bequest was itself registered as a separate charity in December 1995, with the Mercers’ Company as corporate trustee. The charity number was 1051484 and was for the advancement of secondary education in England and in particular for the benefit of St Paul’s School. Grants to St Paul’s School were paid regularly through the 1990s and early 2000s. In 2016 the charity’s assets were transferred to St Paul’s School.

== Memorial Service ==
A memorial service for Professor Paul Ubbelohde was held at the Church of the Immaculate Conception, Farm Street on 24 May 1988. A message from Pope John Paul II was read by Georgina Greene. For several years afterwards, on his birthday, she published in The Times a message remembering him.

Among the many distinguished guests attending the service were the Comte and Comtesse Armand de Malherbe. The Comtesse was formerly Angela, daughter of Alberto Julio Ubbelohde, brother of Paul, who lived in the United States. Angela, whose home was in New Canaan, married the Comte in Marçon, Sarthe on 30 June 1956. Another daughter, Marie Thérèse Ubbelohde (Vicomtesse Ogier d’Ivry), and her husband also attended.
