= Saint-Vincent-du-Lorouër =

- Commune
- Location of Saint-Vincent-du-Lorouër
- Location within France Location within Pays de la Loire
- Coordinates: 47°49′31″N 0°29′21″E
- Country: France
- Region: Pays de la Loire
- Department: Sarthe
- Arrondissement: La Flèche
- Canton: Montval-sur-Loir
- Intercommunality: Loir-Lucé-Bercé

Government
  - Mayor (2026–32): Patrick Renard
- Area^{1}: 27 km^{2} (10 sq mi)
- Population (2023): 814
  - Density: 30/km^{2} (78/sq mi)
- Time zone: UTC+01:00 (CET)
  - Summer (DST): UTC+02:00 (CEST)
- INSEE/Postal code: 72325 /72150
- ^{1} French Land Register data, which excludes lakes, ponds, glaciers > 1 km^{2} (0.386 sq mi or 247 acres) and river estuaries.

Saint-Vincent-du-Lorouër is a commune in the Sarthe department in the region of Pays de la Loire in north-western France.

== See also ==
- Communes of the Sarthe department
