= Saint-Pierre-de-Chevillé =

- Commune
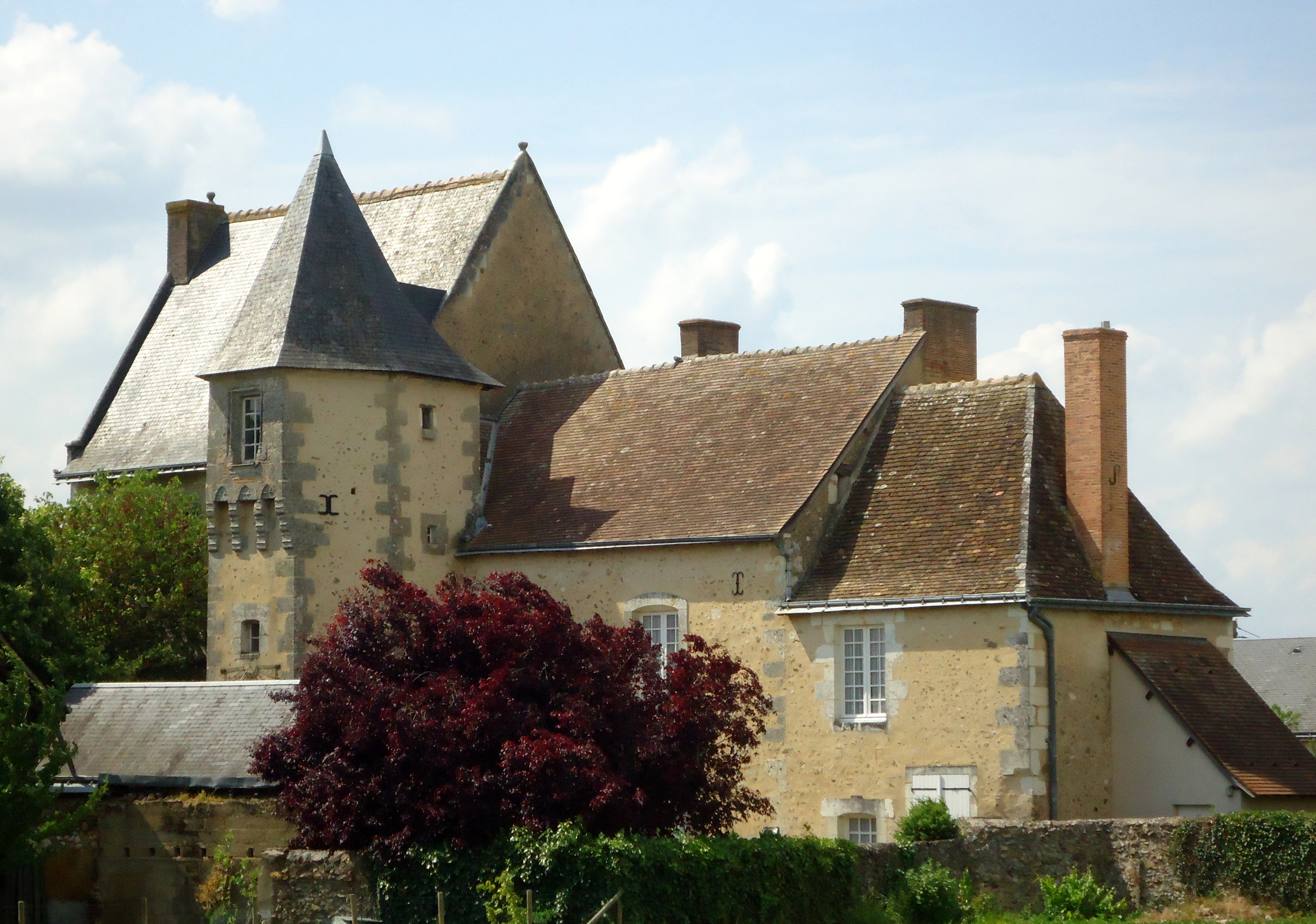
- The presbytery of Saint-Pierre-de-Chevillé
- Location of Saint-Pierre-de-Chevillé
- Location within France Location within Pays de la Loire
- Coordinates: 47°38′45″N 0°26′21″E
- Country: France
- Region: Pays de la Loire
- Department: Sarthe
- Arrondissement: La Flèche
- Canton: Montval-sur-Loir
- Intercommunality: Loir-Lucé-Bercé

Government
  - Mayor (2020–2026): Michelle Boussard
- Area^{1}: 11.45 km^{2} (4.42 sq mi)
- Population (2023): 334
  - Density: 29.2/km^{2} (75.6/sq mi)
- Demonym(s): Chevillais, Chevillaise
- Time zone: UTC+01:00 (CET)
  - Summer (DST): UTC+02:00 (CEST)
- INSEE/Postal code: 72311 /72500
- ^{1} French Land Register data, which excludes lakes, ponds, glaciers > 1 km^{2} (0.386 sq mi or 247 acres) and river estuaries.

Saint-Pierre-de-Chevillé is a commune in the Sarthe department in the region of Pays de la Loire in north-western France.

== See also ==
- Communes of the Sarthe department
