= Courdemanche, Sarthe =

Courdemanche
- Commune
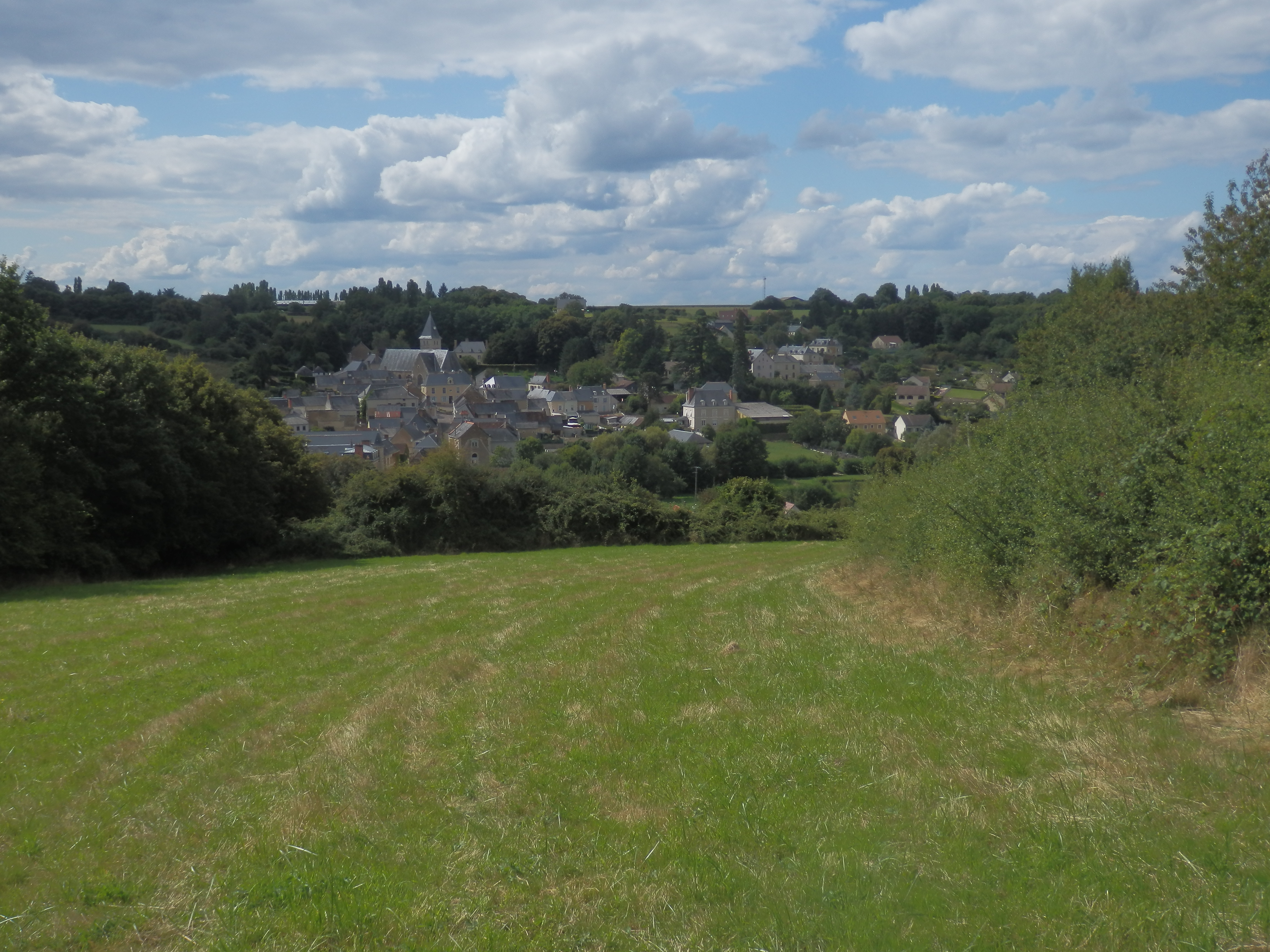
- Courdemanche from the route de Saint-Fraimbault

- Coat of arms
- Location of Courdemanche
- Location within France Location within Pays de la Loire
- Coordinates: 47°49′00″N 0°34′00″E
- Country: France
- Region: Pays de la Loire
- Department: Sarthe
- Arrondissement: La Flèche
- Canton: Montval-sur-Loir
- Intercommunality: Loir-Lucé-Bercé

Government
  - Mayor (2026–32): Natacha Longeray
- Area^{1}: 24.02 km^{2} (9.27 sq mi)
- Highest elevation: 137 m (449 ft)
- Lowest elevation: 53 m (174 ft)
- Population (2023): 623
  - Density: 25.9/km^{2} (67.2/sq mi)
- Demonym(s): Courdemanchois, Courdemanchoise
- Time zone: UTC+01:00 (CET)
  - Summer (DST): UTC+02:00 (CEST)
- INSEE/Postal code: 72103 /72150
- ^{1} French Land Register data, which excludes lakes, ponds, glaciers > 1 km^{2} (0.386 sq mi or 247 acres) and river estuaries.

Courdemanche (French pronunciation: [kuʁdəmɑ̃ʃ]) is a commune in the Sarthe department in the Pays de la Loire region in north-western France.

== See also ==
- Communes of the Sarthe department
