= Saint-Georges-de-la-Couée =

- Commune
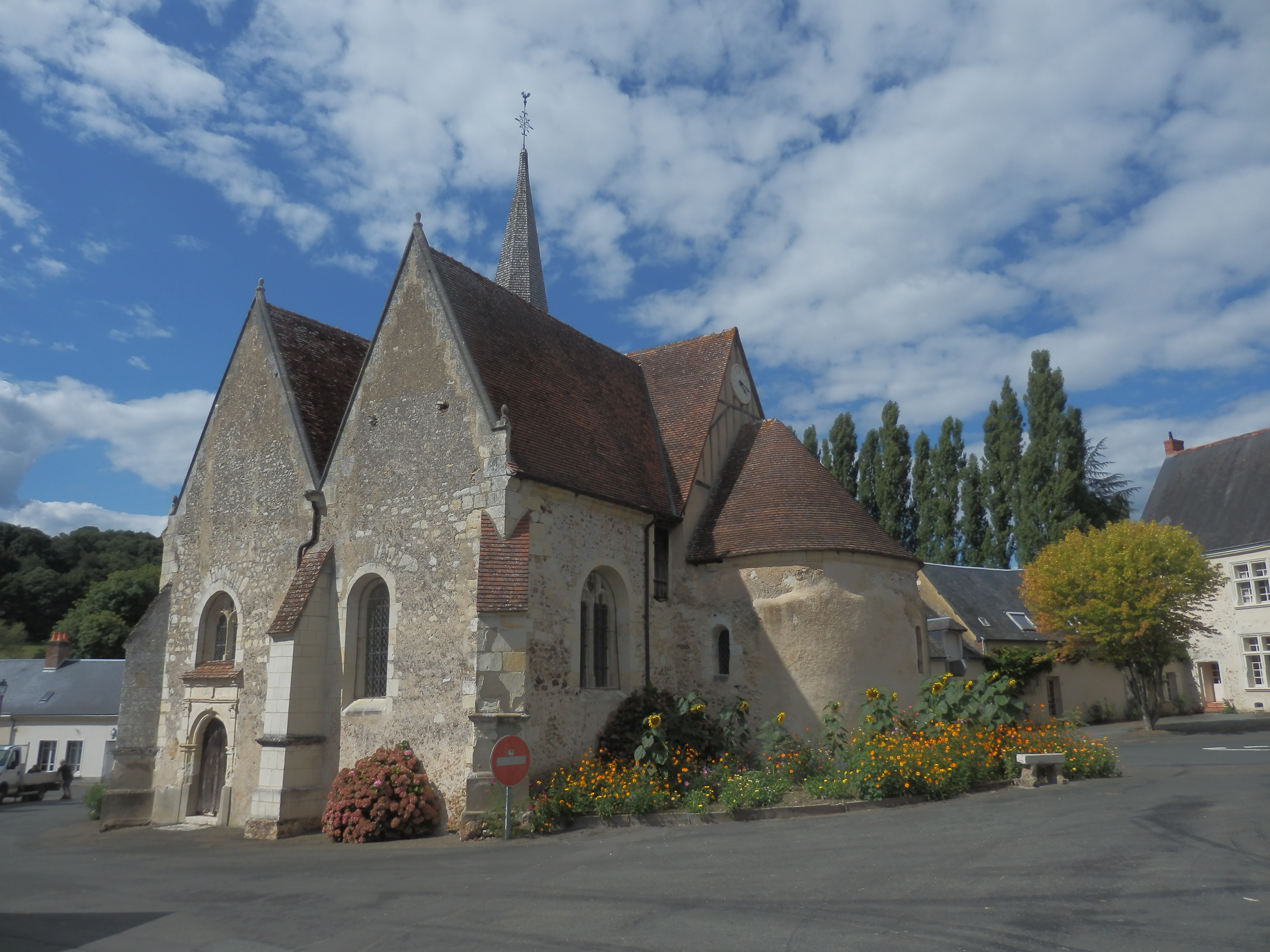
- The church of Saint-Georges-de-la-Couée
- Location of Saint-Georges-de-la-Couée
- Location within France Location within Pays de la Loire
- Coordinates: 47°50′29″N 0°34′59″E
- Country: France
- Region: Pays de la Loire
- Department: Sarthe
- Arrondissement: La Flèche
- Canton: Montval-sur-Loir
- Intercommunality: Loir-Lucé-Bercé

Government
  - Mayor (2026–32): Sylvain Bidier
- Area^{1}: 11.68 km^{2} (4.51 sq mi)
- Highest elevation: 151 m (495 ft)
- Lowest elevation: 77 m (253 ft)
- Population (2023): 181
  - Density: 15.5/km^{2} (40.1/sq mi)
- Time zone: UTC+01:00 (CET)
  - Summer (DST): UTC+02:00 (CEST)
- INSEE/Postal code: 72279 /72150
- ^{1} French Land Register data, which excludes lakes, ponds, glaciers > 1 km^{2} (0.386 sq mi or 247 acres) and river estuaries.

Saint-Georges-de-la-Couée (French pronunciation: [sɛ̃ ʒɔʁʒ də la kwe]) is a commune in the Sarthe department in the region of Pays de la Loire in north-western France.

== See also ==
- Communes of the Sarthe department
