= Thoiré-sur-Dinan =

- Commune
- Location of Thoiré-sur-Dinan
- Location within France Location within Pays de la Loire
- Coordinates: 47°45′13″N 0°26′56″E
- Country: France
- Region: Pays de la Loire
- Department: Sarthe
- Arrondissement: La Flèche
- Canton: Montval-sur-Loir
- Intercommunality: Loir-Lucé-Bercé

Government
  - Mayor (2020–2026): Bruno Boulay
- Area^{1}: 17.72 km^{2} (6.84 sq mi)
- Highest elevation: 151 m (495 ft)
- Lowest elevation: 66 m (217 ft)
- Population (2023): 399
  - Density: 22.5/km^{2} (58.3/sq mi)
- Demonym(s): Thoiréen, Thoiréenne
- Time zone: UTC+01:00 (CET)
  - Summer (DST): UTC+02:00 (CEST)
- INSEE/Postal code: 72356 /72500
- ^{1} French Land Register data, which excludes lakes, ponds, glaciers > 1 km^{2} (0.386 sq mi or 247 acres) and river estuaries.

Thoiré-sur-Dinan is a commune in the Sarthe department in the region of Pays de la Loire in north-western France.

== See also ==
- Communes of the Sarthe department
