= Montreuil-le-Henri =

- Commune
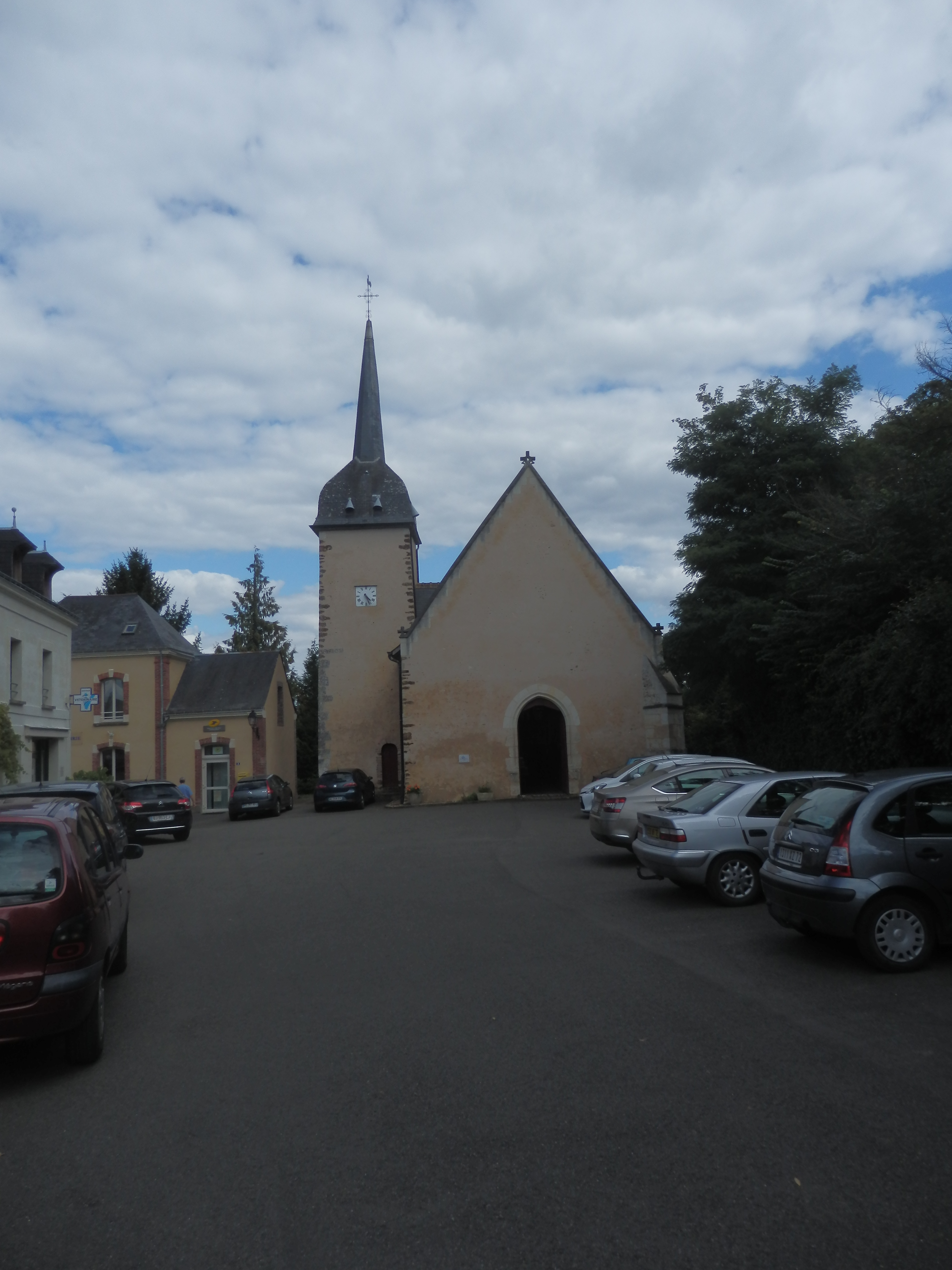
- The church of Sainte-Anne, in Montreuil-le-Henri

- Coat of arms
- Location of Montreuil-le-Henri
- Location within France Location within Pays de la Loire
- Coordinates: 47°51′57″N 0°33′49″E
- Country: France
- Region: Pays de la Loire
- Department: Sarthe
- Arrondissement: La Flèche
- Canton: Montval-sur-Loir
- Intercommunality: Loir-Lucé-Bercé

Government
  - Mayor (2026–32): Laurent Colas
- Area^{1}: 14.39 km^{2} (5.56 sq mi)
- Population (2023): 295
  - Density: 20.5/km^{2} (53.1/sq mi)
- Time zone: UTC+01:00 (CET)
  - Summer (DST): UTC+02:00 (CEST)
- INSEE/Postal code: 72210 /72150
- ^{1} French Land Register data, which excludes lakes, ponds, glaciers > 1 km^{2} (0.386 sq mi or 247 acres) and river estuaries.

Montreuil-le-Henri (French pronunciation: [mɔ̃tʁœj lə ɑ̃ʁi]) is a commune in the Sarthe department in the region of Pays de la Loire in north-western France. It is located 35 kilometres (22 mi) south east of Mans, in the canton of Montval-sur-Loir.

Historically, it was part of the province of Maine, in the area of Haut-Maine. It had 304 inhabitants in 2019. The parish church is dedicated to Saint Anne. The Château de Montreuil-le-Henri is a Gothic building in the centre of the village, dating back to the 11th century.

== Climate ==
In 2010, the village's climate was oceanic, as a study from the CNRS based on data covering the 1971-2000 period. In 2020, Météo-France published a typologie of the climates of the continental France in which the commune is exposed to an altered oceanic climate and is in the climatic region of Middle Loire valley, characterised by a good sun exposition (1850 h/year) and a summer with few of rain.

== Toponymie ==
Rumors has it that the village is named this way because king Henry IV of France stayed the night.

== Linked Personalities ==
Phạm Duy Khiêm (1908-1974), Vietnamese writer and ambassador of the Republique of Viêt Nam in France, living in the village where he committed suicide.

== See also ==
- Communes of the Sarthe department
