= Pruillé-l'Éguillé =

- Commune
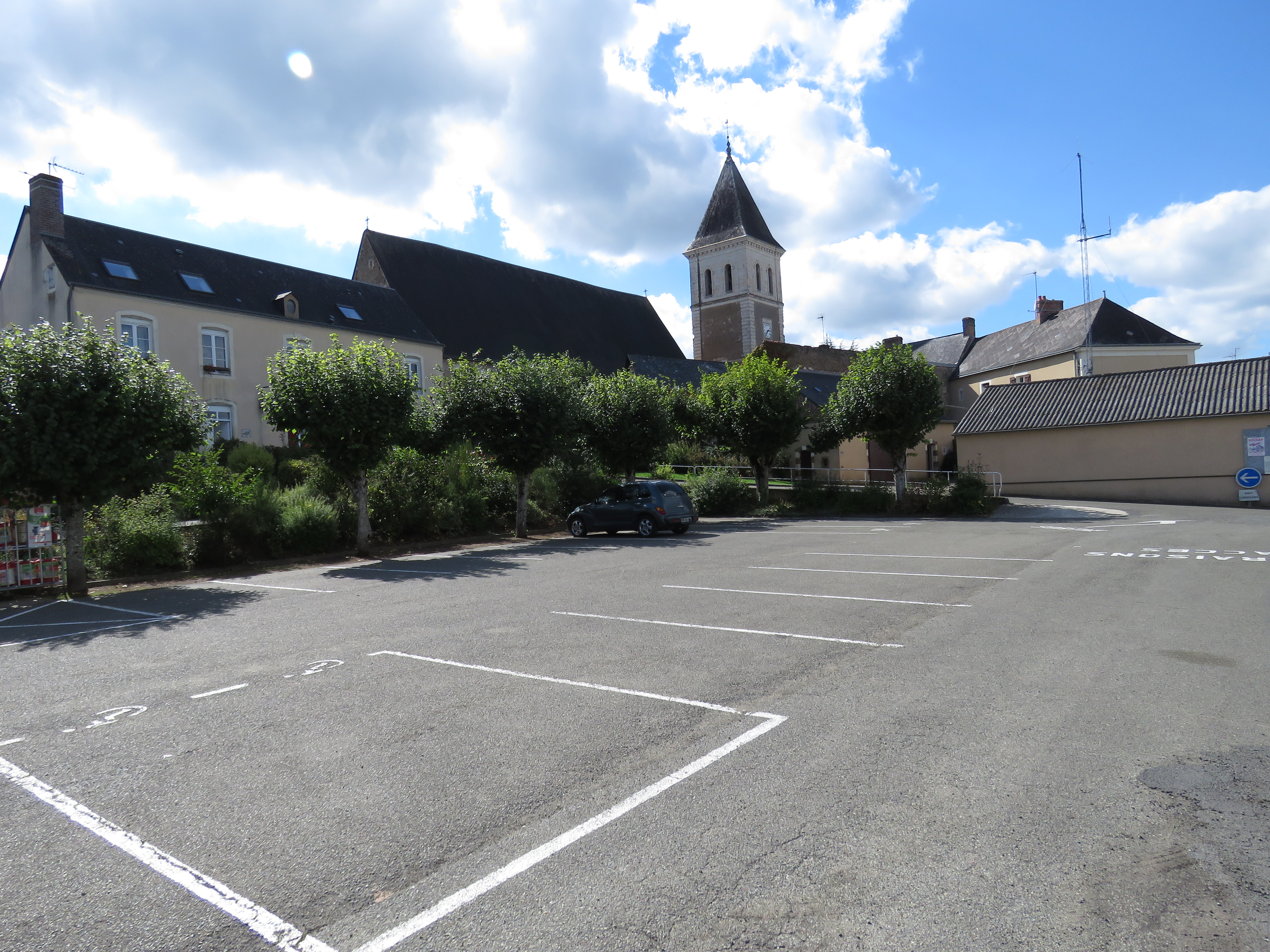
- The church of Saint-Christophe, in Pruillé-l'Éguillé
- Location of Pruillé-l'Éguillé
- Location within France Location within Pays de la Loire
- Coordinates: 47°50′14″N 0°25′54″E
- Country: France
- Region: Pays de la Loire
- Department: Sarthe
- Arrondissement: La Flèche
- Canton: Montval-sur-Loir
- Intercommunality: Loir-Lucé-Bercé

Government
  - Mayor (2026–2032): Myriam Martineau
- Area^{1}: 21.18 km^{2} (8.18 sq mi)
- Highest elevation: 167 m (548 ft)
- Lowest elevation: 88 m (289 ft)
- Population (2023): 801
  - Density: 37.8/km^{2} (97.9/sq mi)
- Demonym: Pruilléen ou Lostre
- Time zone: UTC+01:00 (CET)
  - Summer (DST): UTC+02:00 (CEST)
- INSEE/Postal code: 72248 /72150
- ^{1} French Land Register data, which excludes lakes, ponds, glaciers > 1 km^{2} (0.386 sq mi or 247 acres) and river estuaries.

Pruillé-l'Éguillé is a commune in the Sarthe department in the region of Pays de la Loire in north-western France.

== See also ==
- Communes of the Sarthe department
