= Saint-Pierre-du-Lorouër =

- Commune
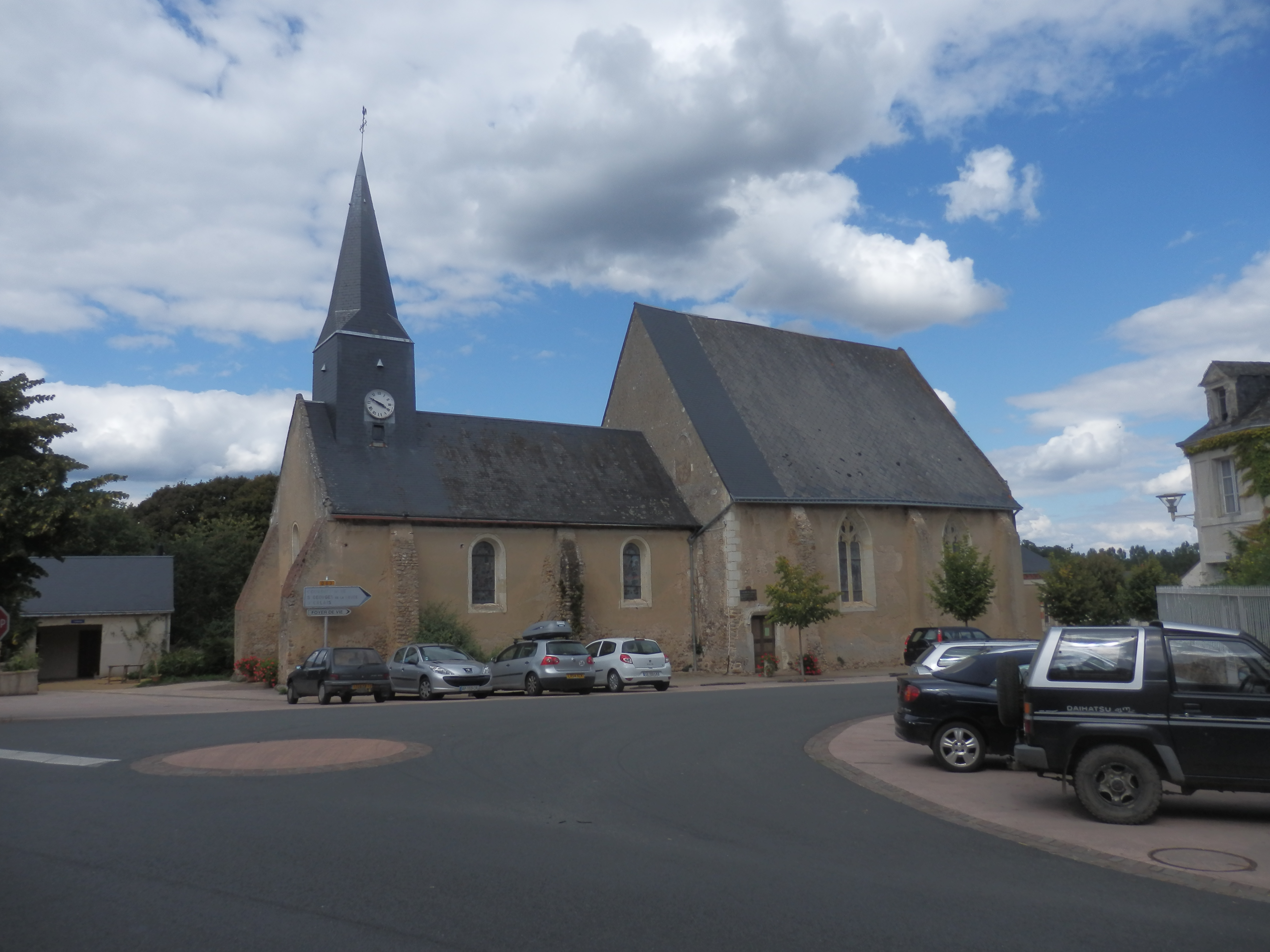
- The church of Saint-Pierre-du-Lorouër
- Location of Saint-Pierre-du-Lorouër
- Location within France Location within Pays de la Loire
- Coordinates: 47°48′21″N 0°31′23″E
- Country: France
- Region: Pays de la Loire
- Department: Sarthe
- Arrondissement: La Flèche
- Canton: Montval-sur-Loir
- Intercommunality: Loir-Lucé-Bercé

Government
  - Mayor (2026–2032): Évelyne Branchu
- Area^{1}: 16.55 km^{2} (6.39 sq mi)
- Highest elevation: 147 m (482 ft)
- Lowest elevation: 58 m (190 ft)
- Population (2023): 356
  - Density: 21.5/km^{2} (55.7/sq mi)
- Time zone: UTC+01:00 (CET)
  - Summer (DST): UTC+02:00 (CEST)
- INSEE/Postal code: 72314 /72150
- ^{1} French Land Register data, which excludes lakes, ponds, glaciers > 1 km^{2} (0.386 sq mi or 247 acres) and river estuaries.

Saint-Pierre-du-Lorouër is a commune in the Sarthe department in the region of Pays de la Loire in north-western France.

== See also ==
- Communes of the Sarthe department
