= Nogent-sur-Loir =

- Commune
- Location of Nogent-sur-Loir
- Location within France Location within Pays de la Loire
- Coordinates: 47°40′11″N 0°23′42″E
- Country: France
- Region: Pays de la Loire
- Department: Sarthe
- Arrondissement: La Flèche
- Canton: Montval-sur-Loir
- Intercommunality: Loir-Lucé-Bercé

Government
  - Mayor (2020–2026): Claude Allaire
- Area^{1}: 10.8 km^{2} (4.2 sq mi)
- Highest elevation: 110 m (360 ft)
- Lowest elevation: 46 m (151 ft)
- Population (2023): 361
  - Density: 33.4/km^{2} (86.6/sq mi)
- Time zone: UTC+01:00 (CET)
  - Summer (DST): UTC+02:00 (CEST)
- INSEE/Postal code: 72221 /72500
- ^{1} French Land Register data, which excludes lakes, ponds, glaciers > 1 km^{2} (0.386 sq mi or 247 acres) and river estuaries.

Nogent-sur-Loir (French pronunciation: [nɔʒɑ̃ syʁ lwaʁ], literally Nogent on Loir) is a commune in the Sarthe department in the region of Pays de la Loire in north-western France.

== See also ==
- Communes of the Sarthe department
