= Jupilles =

- Commune
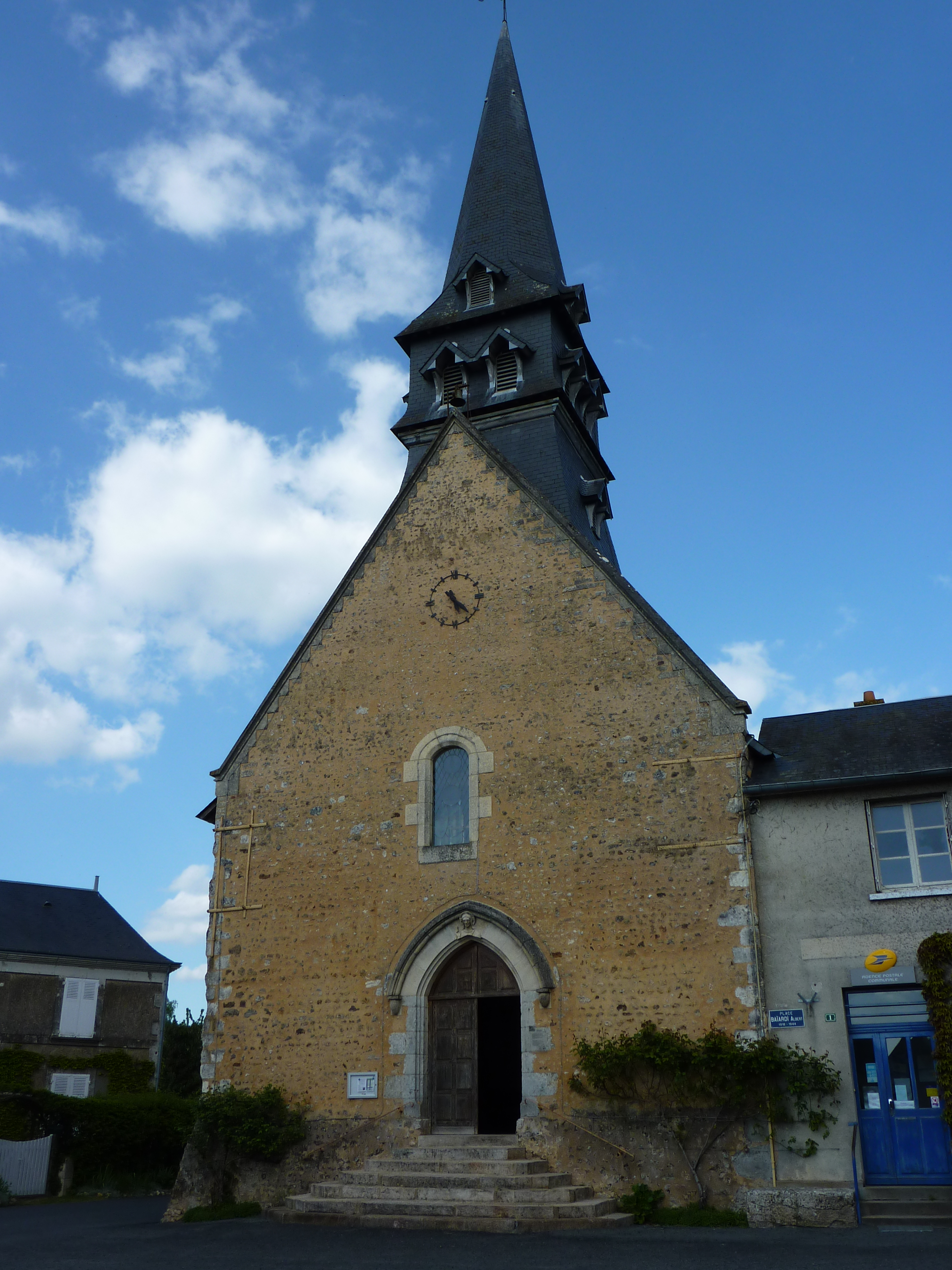
- The church of Saint-Pierre, in Jupilles
- Location of Jupilles
- Location within France Location within Pays de la Loire
- Coordinates: 47°47′25″N 0°24′49″E
- Country: France
- Region: Pays de la Loire
- Department: Sarthe
- Arrondissement: La Flèche
- Canton: Montval-sur-Loir
- Intercommunality: Loir-Lucé-Bercé

Government
  - Mayor (2020–2026): Vincent Gruau
- Area^{1}: 26.41 km^{2} (10.20 sq mi)
- Highest elevation: 172 m (564 ft)
- Lowest elevation: 82 m (269 ft)
- Population (2023): 566
  - Density: 21.4/km^{2} (55.5/sq mi)
- Time zone: UTC+01:00 (CET)
  - Summer (DST): UTC+02:00 (CEST)
- INSEE/Postal code: 72153 /72500
- ^{1} French Land Register data, which excludes lakes, ponds, glaciers > 1 km^{2} (0.386 sq mi or 247 acres) and river estuaries.

Jupilles is a commune in the Sarthe department in the region of Pays de la Loire in north-western France.

== See also ==
- Communes of the Sarthe department
