= Flée, Sarthe =

Flée
- Commune
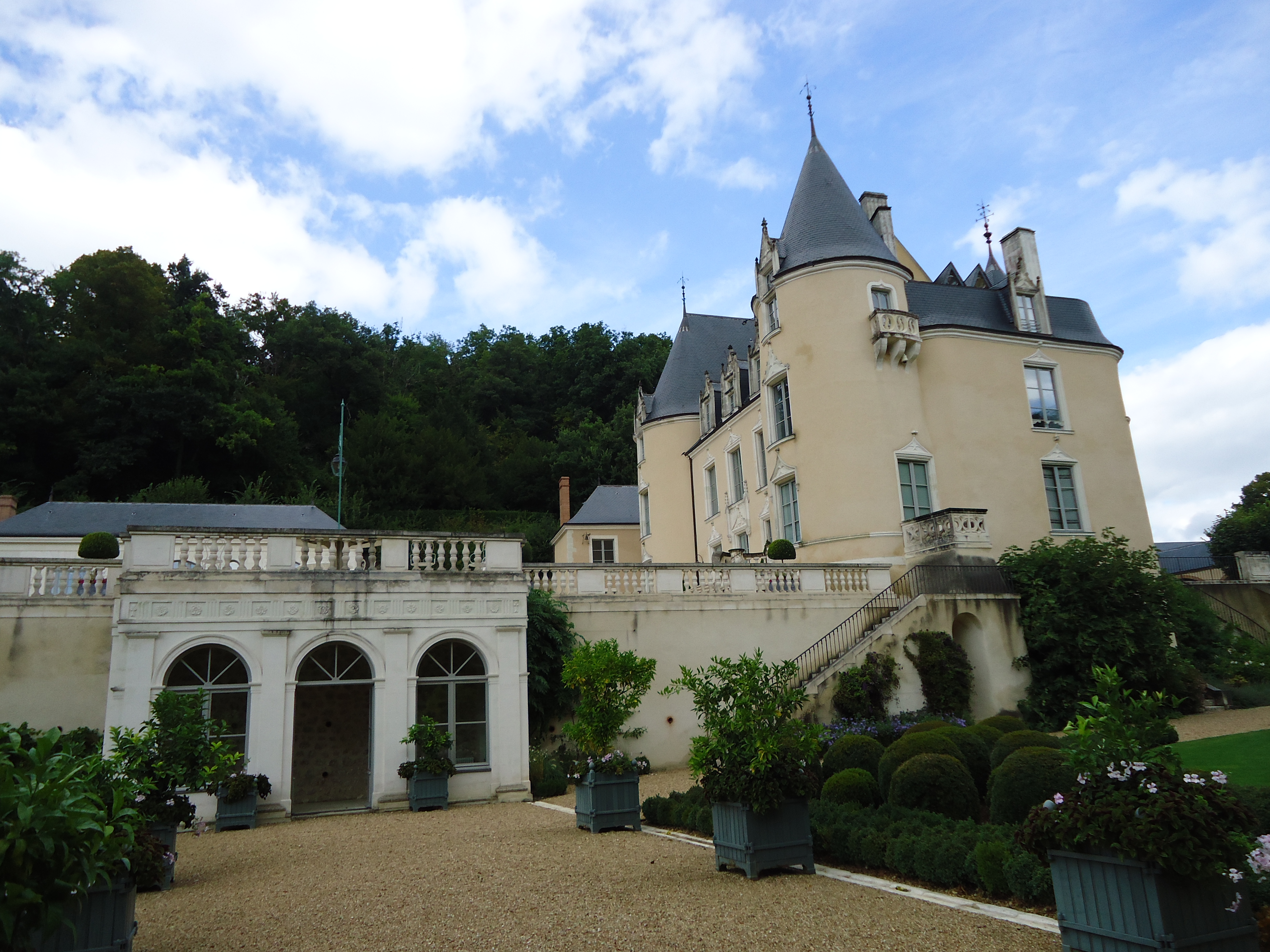
- The chateau of la Motte-Thibergeau, in Flée
- Location of Flée
- Location within France Location within Pays de la Loire
- Coordinates: 47°43′58″N 0°27′11″E
- Country: France
- Region: Pays de la Loire
- Department: Sarthe
- Arrondissement: La Flèche
- Canton: Montval-sur-Loir
- Intercommunality: Loir-Lucé-Bercé

Government
  - Mayor (2020–2026): Monique Gaultier
- Area^{1}: 17.54 km^{2} (6.77 sq mi)
- Highest elevation: 145 m (476 ft)
- Lowest elevation: 47 m (154 ft)
- Population (2023): 528
  - Density: 30.1/km^{2} (78.0/sq mi)
- Demonym(s): Fléen, Fléenne
- Time zone: UTC+01:00 (CET)
  - Summer (DST): UTC+02:00 (CEST)
- INSEE/Postal code: 72134 /72500
- ^{1} French Land Register data, which excludes lakes, ponds, glaciers > 1 km^{2} (0.386 sq mi or 247 acres) and river estuaries.

Flée (French pronunciation: [fle]) is a commune in the Sarthe department in the region of Pays de la Loire in north-western France.

== See also ==
- Communes of the Sarthe department
