= Montval-sur-Loir =

- Commune
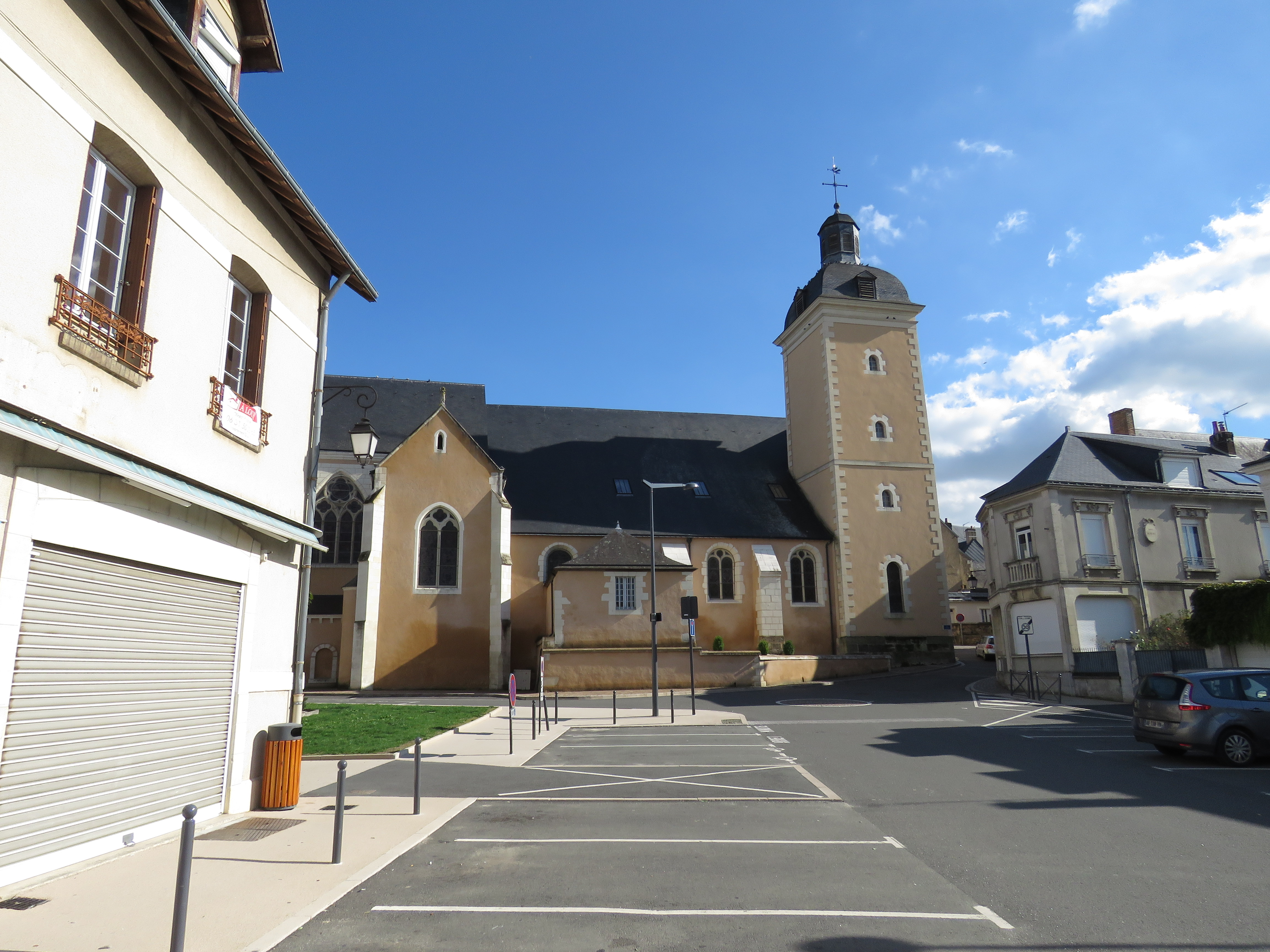
- The church in Château-du-Loir
- Location of Montval-sur-Loir
- Location within France Location within Pays de la Loire
- Coordinates: 47°41′42″N 0°25′05″E
- Country: France
- Region: Pays de la Loire
- Department: Sarthe
- Arrondissement: La Flèche
- Canton: Montval-sur-Loir
- Intercommunality: Loir-Lucé-Bercé

Government
  - Mayor (2020–2026): Hervé Roncière
- Area^{1}: 26.99 km^{2} (10.42 sq mi)
- Population (2023): 5,641
  - Density: 209.0/km^{2} (541.3/sq mi)
- Time zone: UTC+01:00 (CET)
  - Summer (DST): UTC+02:00 (CEST)
- INSEE/Postal code: 72071 /72500
- ^{1} French Land Register data, which excludes lakes, ponds, glaciers > 1 km^{2} (0.386 sq mi or 247 acres) and river estuaries.

Montval-sur-Loir (French pronunciation: [mɔ̃val syʁ lwaʁ]) is a commune in the Sarthe department in the region of Pays de la Loire in north-western France. The municipality was established on 1 October 2016 and consists of the former communes of Château-du-Loir, Montabon and Vouvray-sur-Loir.

== Population ==
Population data refer to the area corresponding with the commune as of January 2025.

Historical population
Year	Pop.	±% p.a.
1968	6,703	—
1975	7,220	+1.07%
1982	7,125	−0.19%
1990	7,013	−0.20%
1999	6,718	−0.48%
2007	6,332	−0.74%
2012	6,326	−0.02%
2017	6,124	−0.65%
2023	5,641	−1.36%
Source: INSEE

== See also ==
- Communes of the Sarthe department
