= Arrondissement of La Flèche =

Coordinates: 47.70°N 0.08°W

La Flèche
- Arrondissement
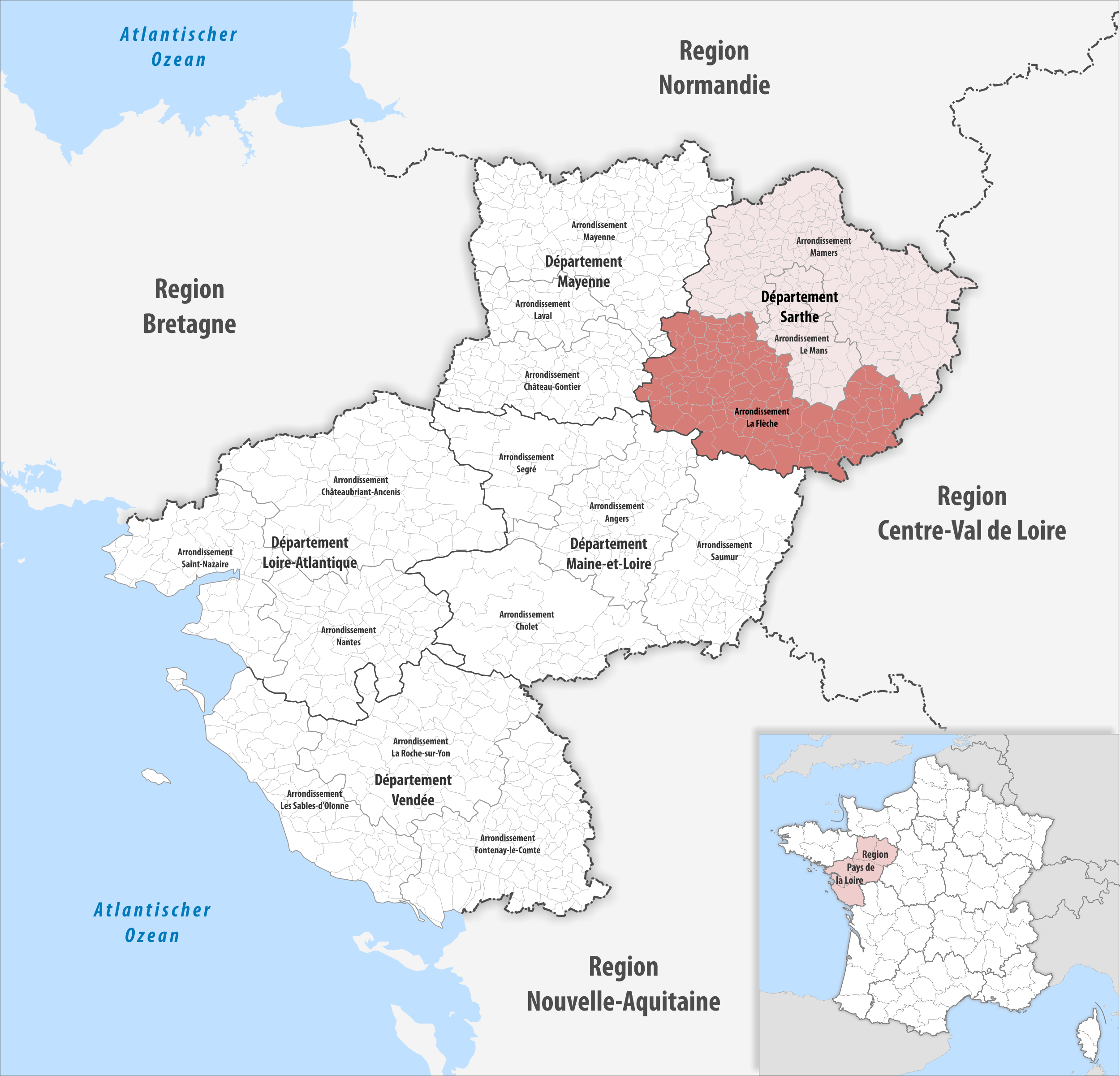
- Location within the region Pays de la Loire
- Country: France
- Region: Pays de la Loire
- Department: Sarthe
- No. of communes: {{{nbcomm}}}
- Area: 2,521.4 km^{2} (973.5 sq mi)
- Population (2023): 148,379
  - Density: 58.848/km^{2} (152.42/sq mi)
- INSEE code: 721

The arrondissement of La Flèche is an arrondissement of France in the Sarthe department in the Pays de la Loire region. It has 118 communes. Its population is 148,804 (2021), and its area is 2,521.4 km^{2} (973.5 sq mi).

== Composition ==
The communes of the arrondissement of La Flèche, and their INSEE codes, are:

1. Amné (72004)
2. Arthezé (72009)
3. Asnières-sur-Vègre (72010)
4. Aubigné-Racan (72013)
5. Auvers-le-Hamon (72016)
6. Auvers-sous-Montfaucon (72017)
7. Avessé (72019)
8. Avoise (72021)
9. Le Bailleul (72022)
10. Bazouges Cré sur Loir (72025)
11. Beaumont-sur-Dême (72027)
12. Beaumont-Pied-de-Bœuf (72028)
13. Bousse (72044)
14. Brains-sur-Gée (72045)
15. La Bruère-sur-Loir (72049)
16. Brûlon (72050)
17. Cérans-Foulletourte (72051)
18. Chahaignes (72052)
19. Chantenay-Villedieu (72059)
20. La Chapelle-aux-Choux (72060)
21. La Chapelle-d'Aligné (72061)
22. La Chartre-sur-le-Loir (72068)
23. Chassillé (72070)
24. Château-l'Hermitage (72072)
25. Chemiré-en-Charnie (72074)
26. Chemiré-le-Gaudin (72075)
27. Chenu (72077)
28. Chevillé (72083)
29. Clermont-Créans (72084)
30. Coulans-sur-Gée (72096)
31. Coulongé (72098)
32. Courcelles-la-Forêt (72100)
33. Courdemanche (72103)
34. Courtillers (72106)
35. Crannes-en-Champagne (72107)
36. Crosmières (72110)
37. Dissay-sous-Courcillon (72115)
38. Dureil (72123)
39. Épineu-le-Chevreuil (72126)
40. Étival-lès-le-Mans (72127)
41. Fercé-sur-Sarthe (72131)
42. Fillé (72133)
43. La Flèche (72154)
44. Flée (72134)
45. La Fontaine-Saint-Martin (72135)
46. Fontenay-sur-Vègre (72136)
47. Le Grand-Lucé (72143)
48. Guécélard (72146)
49. Joué-en-Charnie (72149)
50. Juigné-sur-Sarthe (72151)
51. Jupilles (72153)
52. Lavernat (72160)
53. Lhomme (72161)
54. Ligron (72163)
55. Loir en Vallée (72262)
56. Longnes (72166)
57. Louailles (72167)
58. Loué (72168)
59. Louplande (72169)
60. Luceau (72173)
61. Luché-Pringé (72175)
62. Le Lude (72176)
63. Maigné (72177)
64. Malicorne-sur-Sarthe (72179)
65. Mansigné (72182)
66. Marçon (72183)
67. Mareil-en-Champagne (72184)
68. Mareil-sur-Loir (72185)
69. Mayet (72191)
70. Mézeray (72195)
71. Montreuil-le-Henri (72210)
72. Montval-sur-Loir (72071)
73. Nogent-sur-Loir (72221)
74. Noyen-sur-Sarthe (72223)
75. Oizé (72226)
76. Parcé-sur-Sarthe (72228)
77. Parigné-le-Pôlin (72230)
78. Notre-Dame-du-Pé (72232)
79. Pincé (72236)
80. Pirmil (72237)
81. Poillé-sur-Vègre (72239)
82. Pontvallain (72243)
83. Précigné (72244)
84. Pruillé-l'Éguillé (72248)
85. Requeil (72252)
86. Roëzé-sur-Sarthe (72253)
87. Sablé-sur-Sarthe (72264)
88. Saint-Christophe-en-Champagne (72274)
89. Saint-Denis-d'Orques (72278)
90. Saint-Georges-de-la-Couée (72279)
91. Saint-Germain-d'Arcé (72283)
92. Saint-Jean-de-la-Motte (72291)
93. Saint-Jean-du-Bois (72293)
94. Saint-Ouen-en-Champagne (72307)
95. Saint-Pierre-de-Chevillé (72311)
96. Saint-Pierre-des-Bois (72312)
97. Saint-Pierre-du-Lorouër (72314)
98. Saint-Vincent-du-Lorouër (72325)
99. Sarcé (72327)
100. Savigné-sous-le-Lude (72330)
101. Solesmes (72336)
102. Souligné-Flacé (72339)
103. Souvigné-sur-Sarthe (72343)
104. Spay (72344)
105. La Suze-sur-Sarthe (72346)
106. Tassé (72347)
107. Tassillé (72348)
108. Thoiré-sur-Dinan (72356)
109. Thorée-les-Pins (72357)
110. Vaas (72364)
111. Vallon-sur-Gée (72367)
112. Verneil-le-Chétif (72369)
113. Villaines-sous-Lucé (72376)
114. Villaines-sous-Malicorne (72377)
115. Vion (72378)
116. Viré-en-Champagne (72379)
117. Voivres-lès-le-Mans (72381)
118. Yvré-le-Pôlin (72385)

== History ==
The arrondissement of La Flèche was created in 1800. In February 2006 it absorbed the five cantons of La Chartre-sur-le-Loir, Château-du-Loir, Le Grand-Lucé, Loué and La Suze-sur-Sarthe from the arrondissement of Le Mans.

As a result of the reorganisation of the cantons of France which came into effect in 2015, the borders of the cantons are no longer related to the borders of the arrondissements. The cantons of the arrondissement of La Flèche were, as of January 2015:

1. Brûlon
2. La Chartre-sur-le-Loir
3. Château-du-Loir
4. La Flèche
5. Le Grand-Lucé
6. Loué
7. Le Lude
8. Malicorne-sur-Sarthe
9. Mayet
10. Pontvallain
11. Sablé-sur-Sarthe
12. La Suze-sur-Sarthe

== Sub-prefects ==
- Gérard Bougrier : 1982-1985 : sub-prefect of La Flèche
