= Beaumont-Pied-de-Bœuf, Sarthe =

Beaumont-Pied-de-Bœuf
- Commune
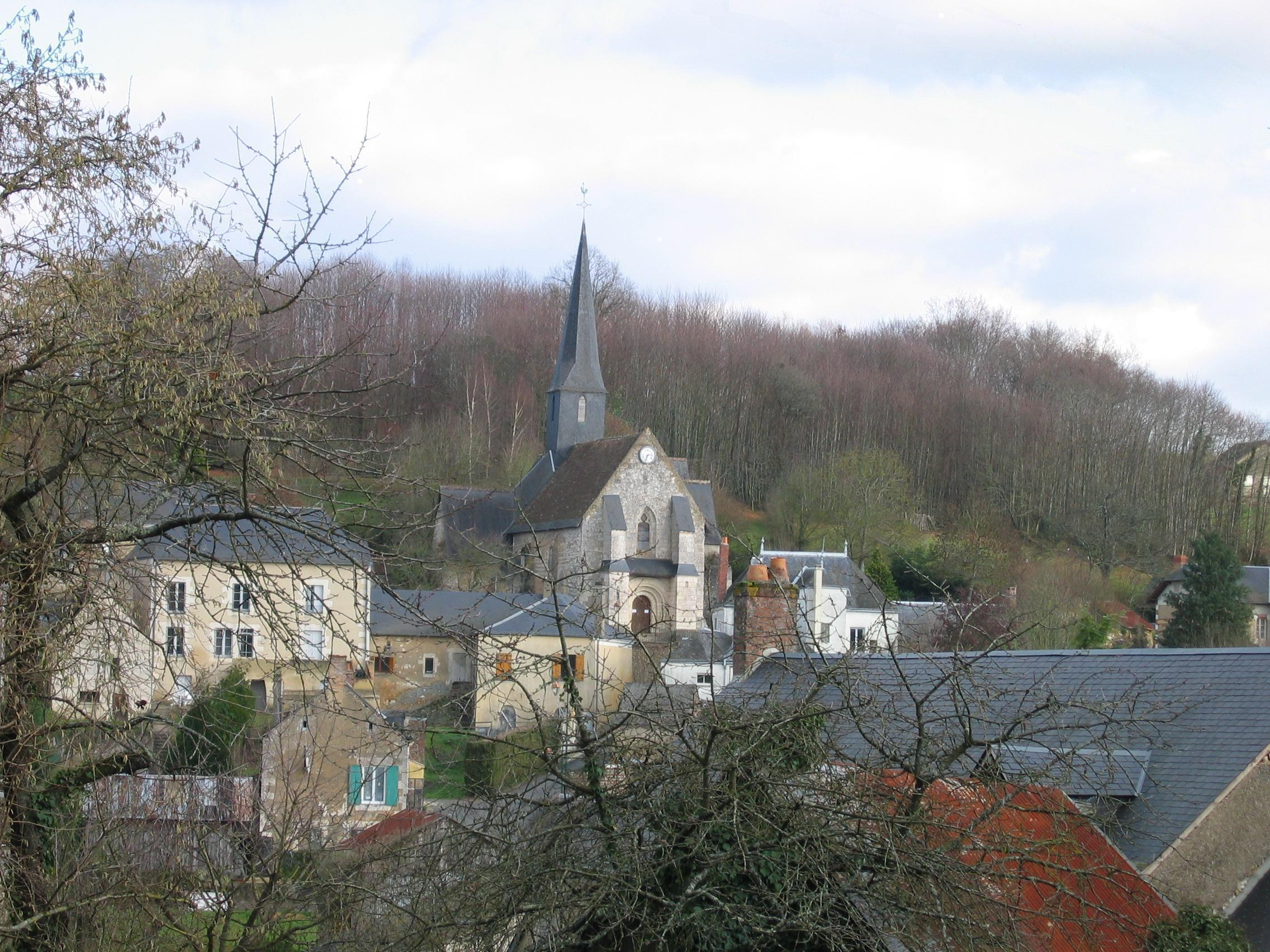
- The church seen from the D216
- Location of Beaumont-Pied-de-Bœuf
- Location within France Location within Pays de la Loire
- Coordinates: 47°45′32″N 0°24′04″E
- Country: France
- Region: Pays de la Loire
- Department: Sarthe
- Arrondissement: La Flèche
- Canton: Montval-sur-Loir
- Intercommunality: Loir-Lucé-Bercé

Government
  - Mayor (2020–2026): Joël Tabareau
- Area^{1}: 24.68 km^{2} (9.53 sq mi)
- Highest elevation: 164 m (538 ft)
- Lowest elevation: 74 m (243 ft)
- Population (2023): 472
  - Density: 19.1/km^{2} (49.5/sq mi)
- Demonym(s): Belmontais, Belmontaise
- Time zone: UTC+01:00 (CET)
  - Summer (DST): UTC+02:00 (CEST)
- INSEE/Postal code: 72028 /72500
- ^{1} French Land Register data, which excludes lakes, ponds, glaciers > 1 km^{2} (0.386 sq mi or 247 acres) and river estuaries.

Beaumont-Pied-de-Bœuf (French pronunciation: [bomɔ̃ pje də bœf]) is a commune in the Sarthe department in the region of Pays de la Loire in north-western France.

== See also ==
- Communes of the Sarthe department
