= Verneil-le-Chétif =

- Commune
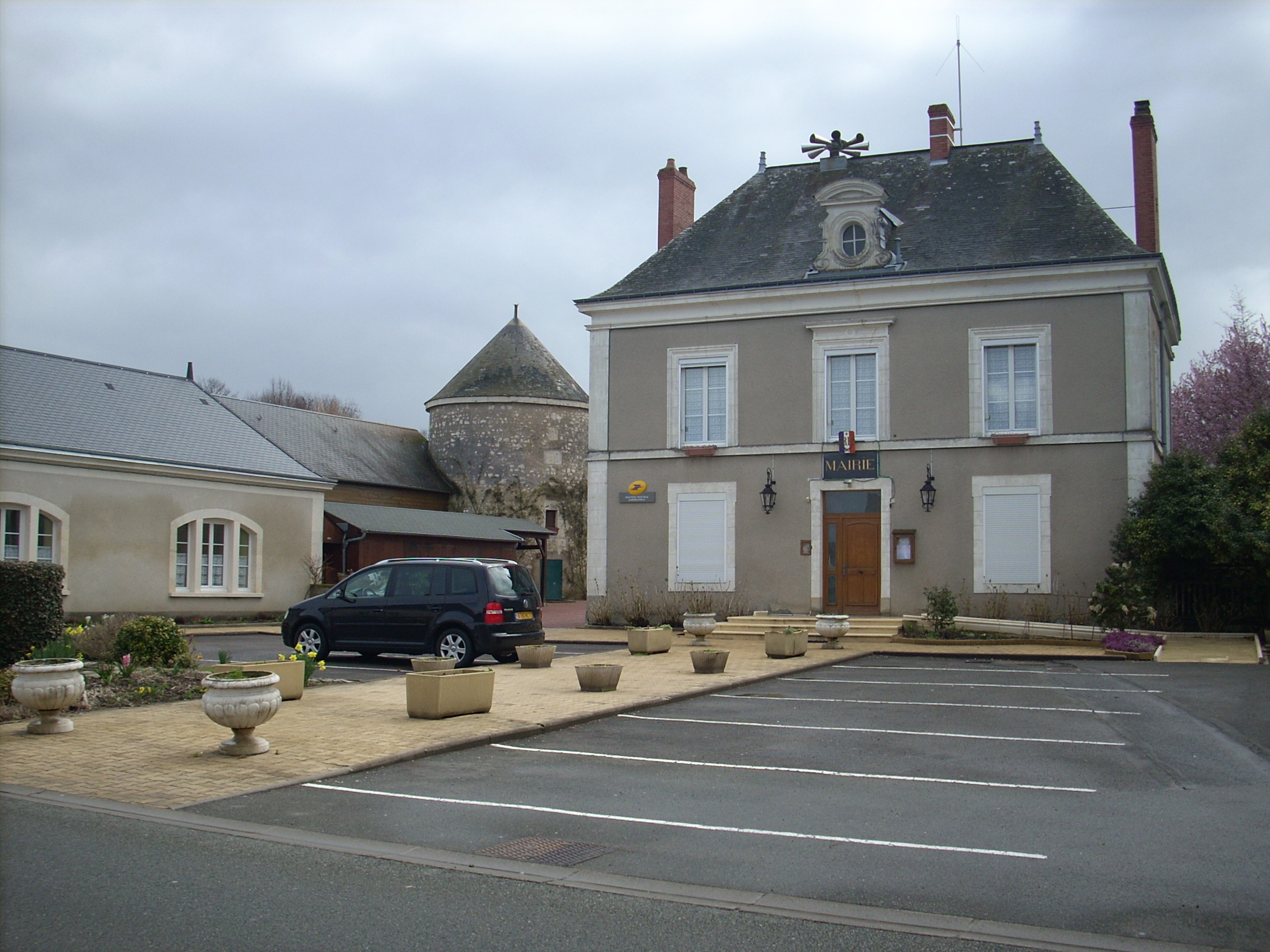
- The town hall of Verneil-le-Chétif
- Location of Verneil-le-Chétif
- Location within France Location within Pays de la Loire
- Coordinates: 47°43′59″N 0°17′48″E
- Country: France
- Region: Pays de la Loire
- Department: Sarthe
- Arrondissement: La Flèche
- Canton: Le Lude
- Intercommunality: Sud Sarthe

Government
  - Mayor (2020–2026): Mickaël Allard
- Area^{1}: 14.8 km^{2} (5.7 sq mi)
- Population (2023): 584
  - Density: 39.5/km^{2} (102/sq mi)
- Demonym: Vernalien
- Time zone: UTC+01:00 (CET)
  - Summer (DST): UTC+02:00 (CEST)
- INSEE/Postal code: 72369 /72360
- ^{1} French Land Register data, which excludes lakes, ponds, glaciers > 1 km^{2} (0.386 sq mi or 247 acres) and river estuaries.

Verneil-le-Chétif (French pronunciation: [vɛʁnɛj lə ʃetif]) is a commune in the Sarthe department in the region of Pays de la Loire in north-western France.

== See also ==
- Communes of the Sarthe department
