= Le Grand-Lucé =

- Commune
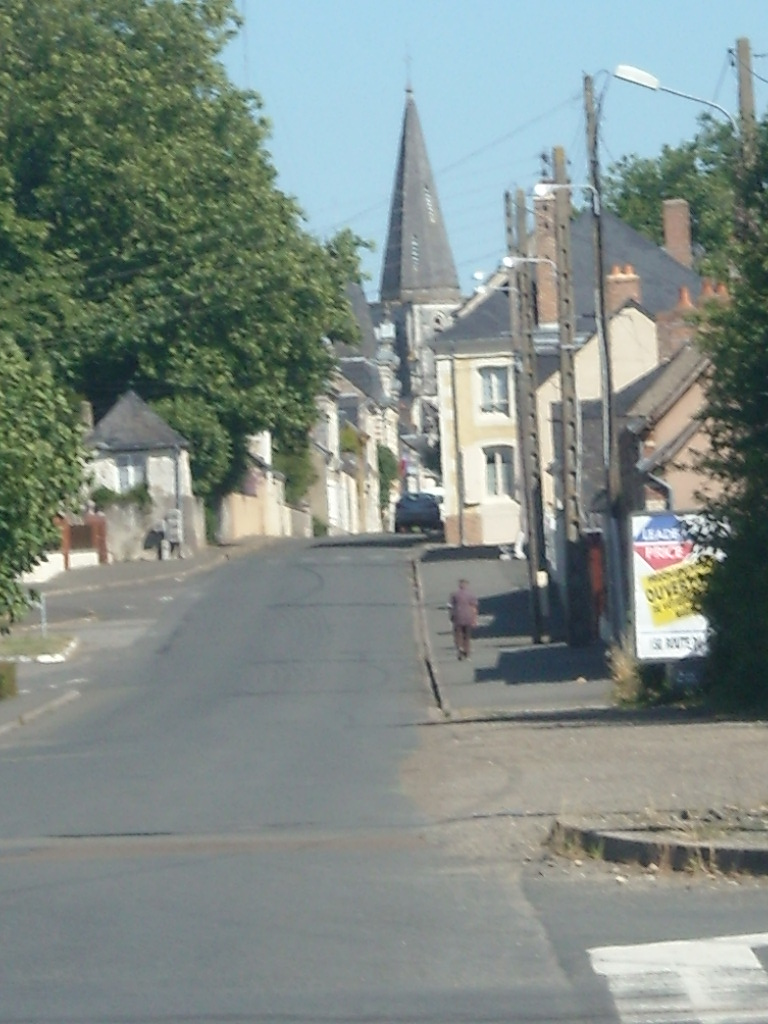
- The main road through La Grand-Lucé

- Coat of arms
- Location of Le Grand-Lucé
- Location within France Location within Pays de la Loire
- Coordinates: 47°51′57″N 0°28′13″E
- Country: France
- Region: Pays de la Loire
- Department: Sarthe
- Arrondissement: La Flèche
- Canton: Montval-sur-Loir
- Intercommunality: Loir-Lucé-Bercé

Government
  - Mayor (2026–2032): Pascal Dupuis
- Area^{1}: 27.26 km^{2} (10.53 sq mi)
- Highest elevation: 153 m (502 ft)
- Lowest elevation: 73 m (240 ft)
- Population (2023): 1,949
  - Density: 71.50/km^{2} (185.2/sq mi)
- Demonym(s): Lucéen, Lucéenne
- Time zone: UTC+01:00 (CET)
  - Summer (DST): UTC+02:00 (CEST)
- INSEE/Postal code: 72143 /72150
- ^{1} French Land Register data, which excludes lakes, ponds, glaciers > 1 km^{2} (0.386 sq mi or 247 acres) and river estuaries.

Le Grand-Lucé is a commune in the Sarthe department in the region of Pays de la Loire in north-western France.

== Geography ==
Grand-Lucé is a former cantonal capital, abolished in 2015, in the Sarthe department, located 28 km south-east of Le Mans in the natural region of Perche.

== See also ==
- Communes of the Sarthe department
