= Beaumont-sur-Dême =

- Commune
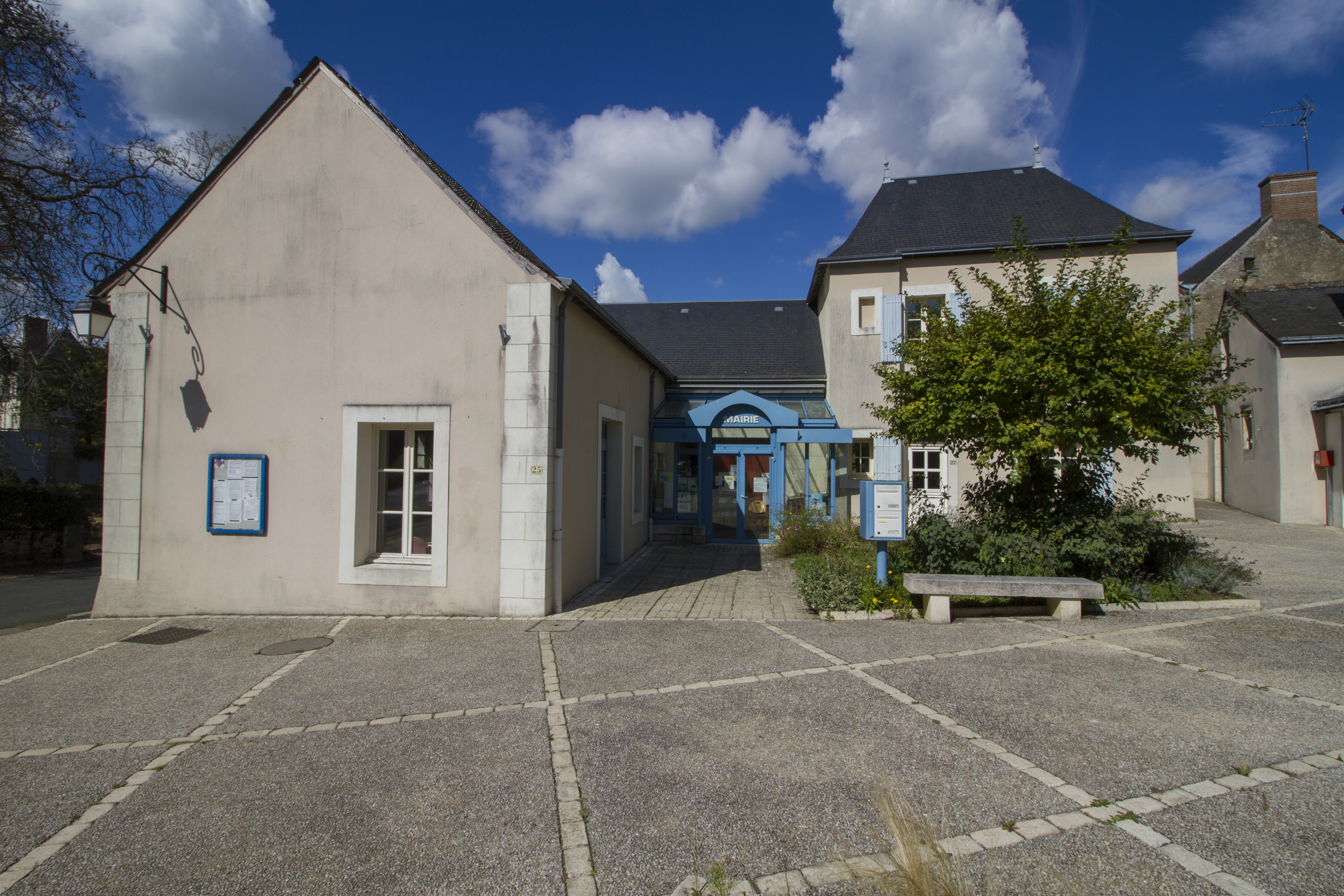
- Town hall

- Coat of arms
- Location of Beaumont-sur-Dême
- Location within France Location within Pays de la Loire
- Coordinates: 47°41′42″N 0°34′09″E
- Country: France
- Region: Pays de la Loire
- Department: Sarthe
- Arrondissement: La Flèche
- Canton: Montval-sur-Loir
- Intercommunality: Loir-Lucé-Bercé

Government
  - Mayor (2020–2026): Guy Leclerc
- Area^{1}: 13.49 km^{2} (5.21 sq mi)
- Highest elevation: 129 m (423 ft)
- Lowest elevation: 57 m (187 ft)
- Population (2023): 326
  - Density: 24.2/km^{2} (62.6/sq mi)
- Demonym(s): Beaumontais, Beaumontaise
- Time zone: UTC+01:00 (CET)
  - Summer (DST): UTC+02:00 (CEST)
- INSEE/Postal code: 72027 /72340
- ^{1} French Land Register data, which excludes lakes, ponds, glaciers > 1 km^{2} (0.386 sq mi or 247 acres) and river estuaries.

Beaumont-sur-Dême (French pronunciation: [bomɔ̃ syʁ dɛm]) is a commune in the Sarthe department in the region of Pays de la Loire in north-western France.

== See also ==
- Communes of the Sarthe department
