= Luceau =

- Commune
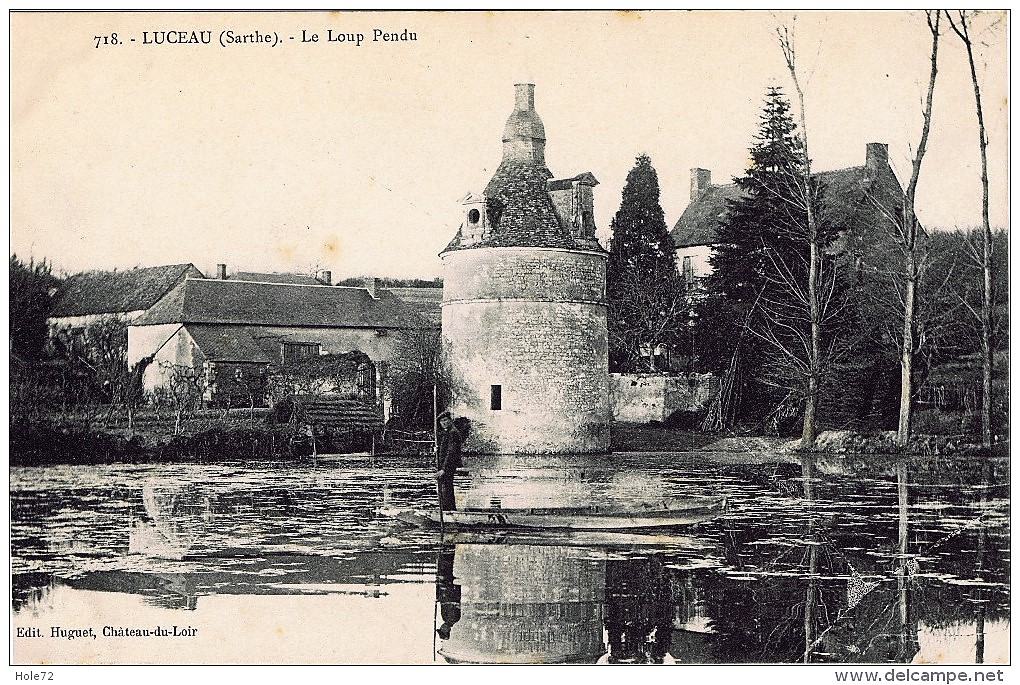
- The château of le Loup Pendu, circa. 1900
- Location of Luceau
- Location within France Location within Pays de la Loire
- Coordinates: 47°42′42″N 0°23′49″E
- Country: France
- Region: Pays de la Loire
- Department: Sarthe
- Arrondissement: La Flèche
- Canton: Montval-sur-Loir
- Intercommunality: Loir-Lucé-Bercé

Government
  - Mayor (2020–2026): Jean-Michel Chiquet
- Area^{1}: 18.77 km^{2} (7.25 sq mi)
- Highest elevation: 147 m (482 ft)
- Lowest elevation: 55 m (180 ft)
- Population (2023): 1,225
  - Density: 65.26/km^{2} (169.0/sq mi)
- Demonym(s): Lucéen, Lucéenne
- Time zone: UTC+01:00 (CET)
  - Summer (DST): UTC+02:00 (CEST)
- INSEE/Postal code: 72173 /72500
- ^{1} French Land Register data, which excludes lakes, ponds, glaciers > 1 km^{2} (0.386 sq mi or 247 acres) and river estuaries.

Luceau (French pronunciation: [lyso]) is a commune in the Sarthe department in the region of Pays de la Loire in north-western France.

== See also ==
- Communes of the Sarthe department
