= Lhomme =

- Commune
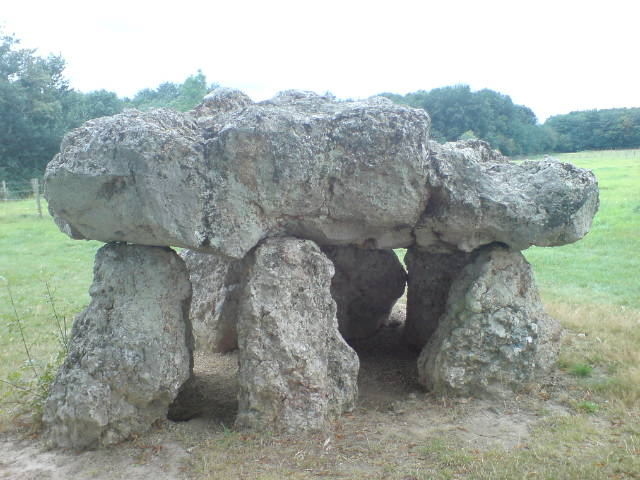
- The dolmen of Maupertuis
- Location of Lhomme
- Location within France Location within Pays de la Loire
- Coordinates: 47°44′40″N 0°33′28″E
- Country: France
- Region: Pays de la Loire
- Department: Sarthe
- Arrondissement: La Flèche
- Canton: Montval-sur-Loir
- Intercommunality: Loir-Lucé-Bercé

Government
  - Mayor (2020–2026): Philippe Wehrlé
- Area^{1}: 18.4 km^{2} (7.1 sq mi)
- Population (2023): 933
  - Density: 50.7/km^{2} (131/sq mi)
- Demonym(s): Lhommois, Lhommoise
- Time zone: UTC+01:00 (CET)
  - Summer (DST): UTC+02:00 (CEST)
- INSEE/Postal code: 72161 /72340
- Website: www.lhomme-72.fr
- ^{1} French Land Register data, which excludes lakes, ponds, glaciers > 1 km^{2} (0.386 sq mi or 247 acres) and river estuaries.

Lhomme (French pronunciation: [lɔm]) is a commune in the Sarthe department in the region of Pays de la Loire in north-western France.

== See also ==
- Communes of the Sarthe department
