= Vaas, Sarthe =

Vaas
- Commune
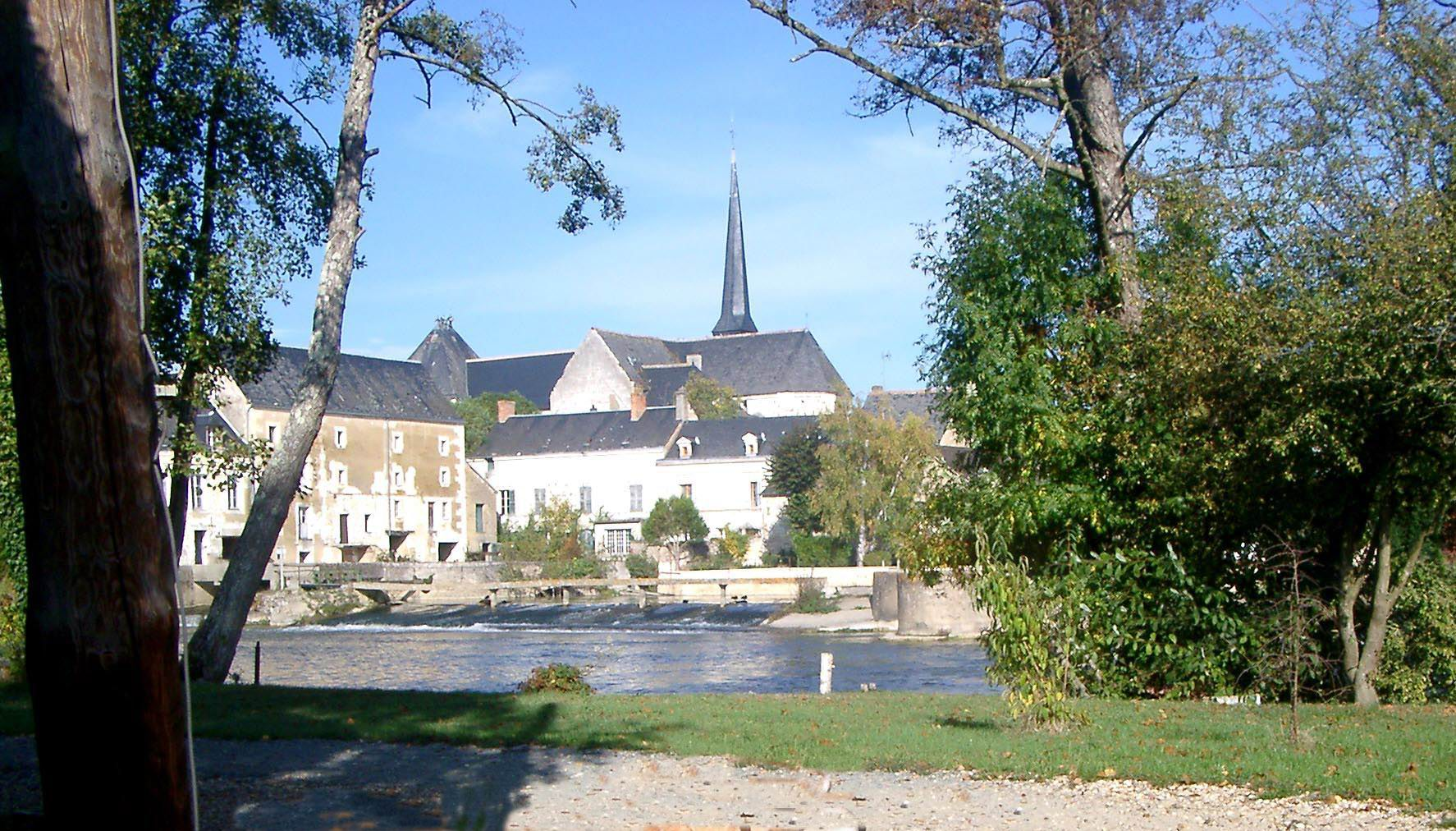
- The weir, church and mill

- Coat of arms
- Location of Vaas
- Location within France Location within Pays de la Loire
- Coordinates: 47°40′12″N 0°18′47″E
- Country: France
- Region: Pays de la Loire
- Department: Sarthe
- Arrondissement: La Flèche
- Canton: Le Lude
- Intercommunality: Sud Sarthe

Government
  - Mayor (2020–2026): Ghislaine Leviau
- Area^{1}: 30.14 km^{2} (11.64 sq mi)
- Highest elevation: 116 m (381 ft)
- Lowest elevation: 39 m (128 ft)
- Population (2023): 1,371
  - Density: 45.49/km^{2} (117.8/sq mi)
- Demonym(s): Védaquais, Védaquaise
- Time zone: UTC+01:00 (CET)
  - Summer (DST): UTC+02:00 (CEST)
- INSEE/Postal code: 72364 /72500
- ^{1} French Land Register data, which excludes lakes, ponds, glaciers > 1 km^{2} (0.386 sq mi or 247 acres) and river estuaries.

Vaas (French pronunciation: [vas]) is a commune in the Sarthe department in the region of Pays de la Loire in north-western France.

== Population ==
Historical population
Year	Pop.	±% p.a.
1968	1,673	—
1975	1,598	−0.65%
1982	1,590	−0.07%
1990	1,564	−0.21%
1999	1,540	−0.17%
2007	1,647	+0.84%
2012	1,541	−1.32%
2017	1,510	−0.41%
2023	1,371	−1.60%
Source: INSEE

== See also ==
- Communes of the Sarthe department
