= La Chartre-sur-le-Loir =

- Commune
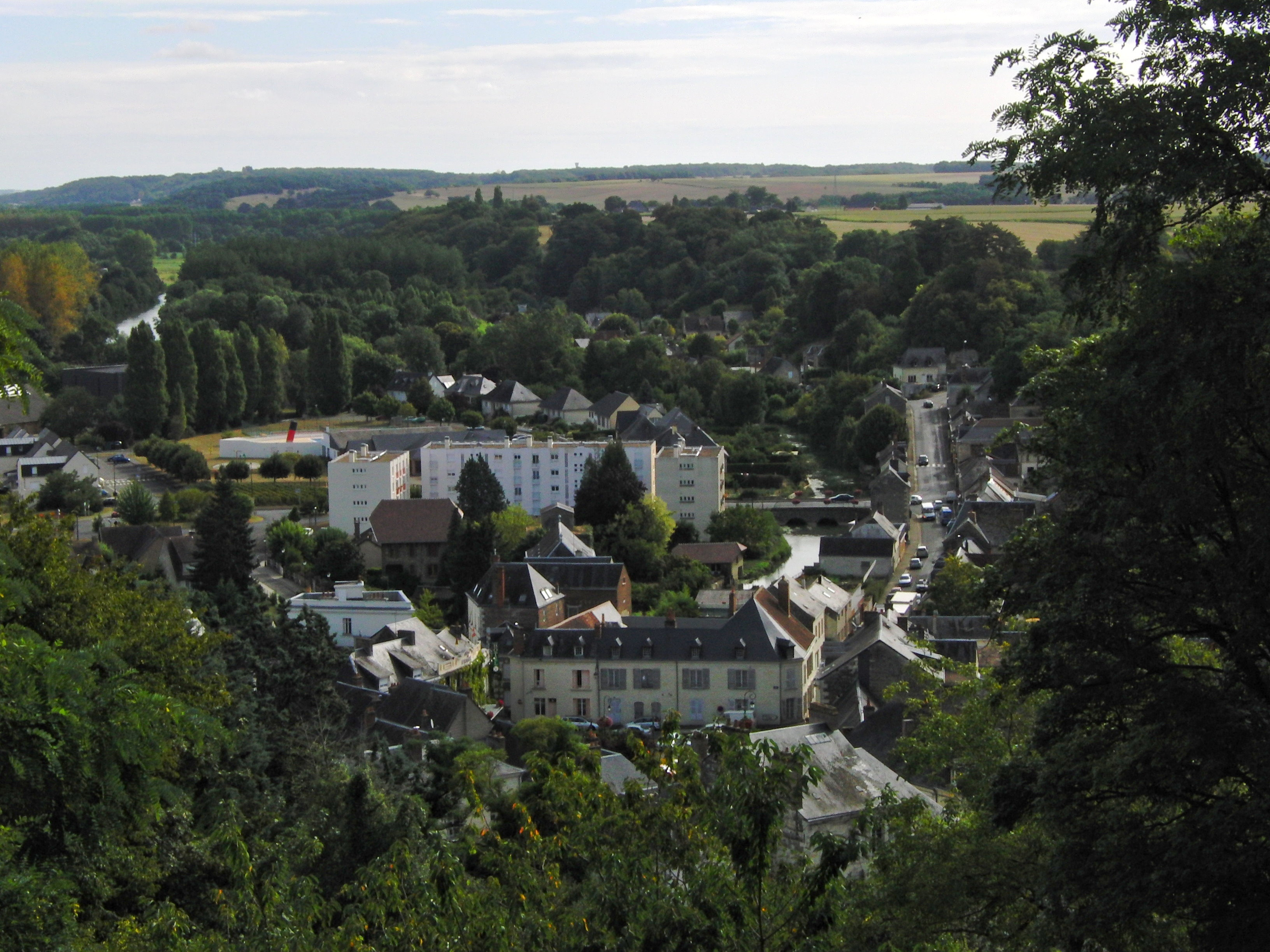
- View of the village

- Coat of arms
- Location of La Chartre-sur-le-Loir
- Location within France Location within Pays de la Loire
- Coordinates: 47°43′47″N 0°34′26″E
- Country: France
- Region: Pays de la Loire
- Department: Sarthe
- Arrondissement: La Flèche
- Canton: Montval-sur-Loir
- Intercommunality: Loir-Lucé-Bercé

Government
  - Mayor (2020–2026): Michel Dutheil
- Area^{1}: 8.30 km^{2} (3.20 sq mi)
- Highest elevation: 132 m (433 ft)
- Lowest elevation: 51 m (167 ft)
- Population (2023): 1,370
  - Density: 165/km^{2} (428/sq mi)
- Demonym(s): Chartrain, Chartraine
- Time zone: UTC+01:00 (CET)
  - Summer (DST): UTC+02:00 (CEST)
- INSEE/Postal code: 72068 /72340
- Website: www.lachartresurleloir.fr
- ^{1} French Land Register data, which excludes lakes, ponds, glaciers > 1 km^{2} (0.386 sq mi or 247 acres) and river estuaries.

La Chartre-sur-le-Loir (French pronunciation: [la ʃaʁtʁ syʁ lə lwaʁ], literally La Chartre on the Loir) is a commune in the Sarthe department in the Pays de la Loire region in north-western France.

The surviving church dedicated to St. Vincent was designed by the architect Delarue c. 1830. It possesses mid-nineteenth century stained glass depicting the saint and other personages.

Before the early nineteenth century there were also churches dedicated to St. Mary Magdalen and to St. Nicholas, and in close proximity a priory.

== See also ==
- Communes of the Sarthe department
