= Chahaignes =

- Commune
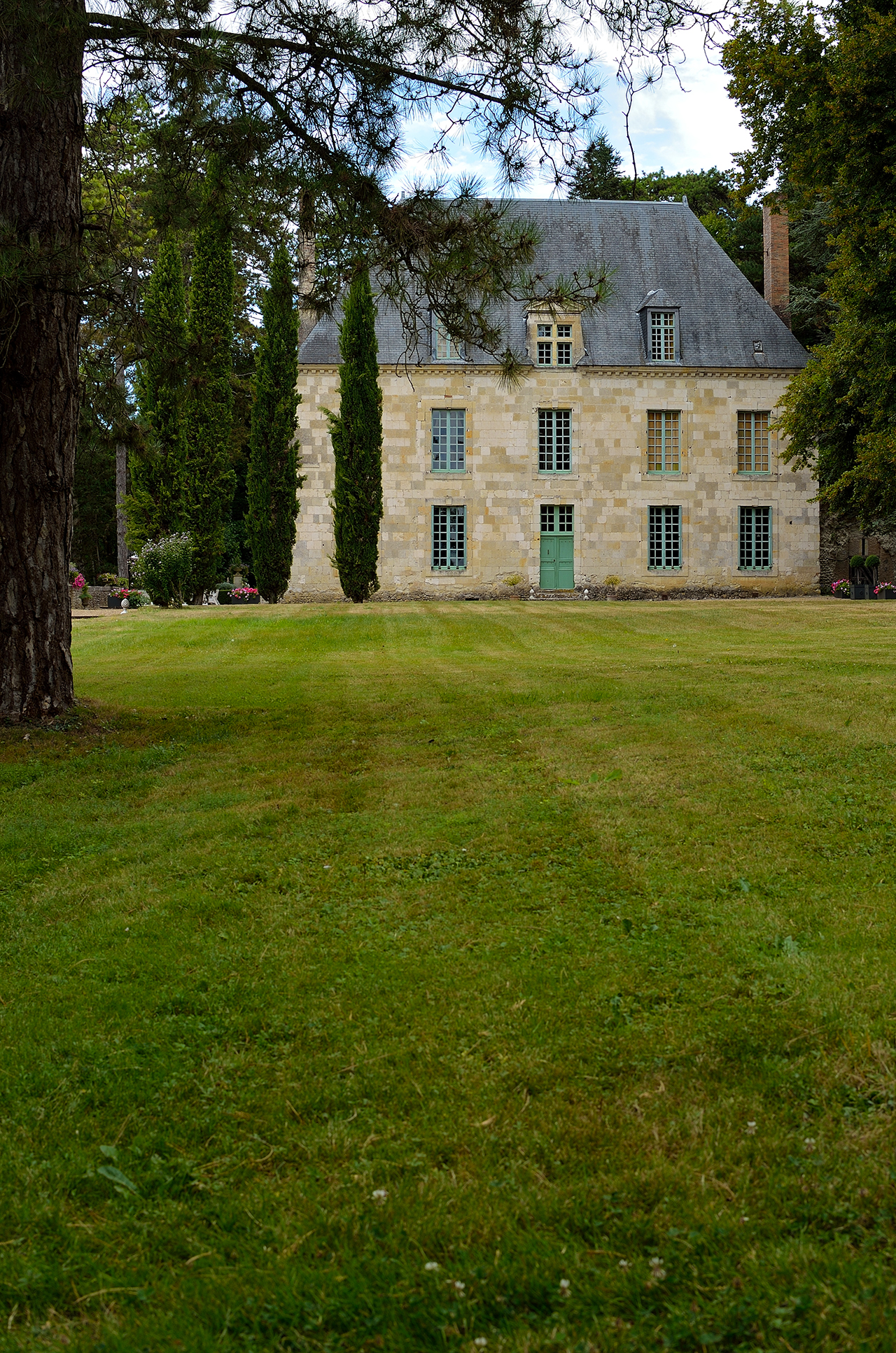
- Château de la Jaille
- Location of Chahaignes
- Location within France Location within Pays de la Loire
- Coordinates: 47°44′00″N 0°31′00″E
- Country: France
- Region: Pays de la Loire
- Department: Sarthe
- Arrondissement: La Flèche
- Canton: Montval-sur-Loir
- Intercommunality: Loir-Lucé-Bercé

Government
  - Mayor (2020–2026): Dominique Peter
- Area^{1}: 22.83 km^{2} (8.81 sq mi)
- Population (2023): 664
  - Density: 29.1/km^{2} (75.3/sq mi)
- Demonym(s): Chahaignau, Chahaignale
- Time zone: UTC+01:00 (CET)
  - Summer (DST): UTC+02:00 (CEST)
- INSEE/Postal code: 72052 /72340
- ^{1} French Land Register data, which excludes lakes, ponds, glaciers > 1 km^{2} (0.386 sq mi or 247 acres) and river estuaries.

Chahaignes (French pronunciation: [ʃa.ɛɲ]) is a commune in the Sarthe department in the region of Pays de la Loire in north-western France.

== See also ==
- Communes of the Sarthe department
