= Dissay-sous-Courcillon =

- Commune
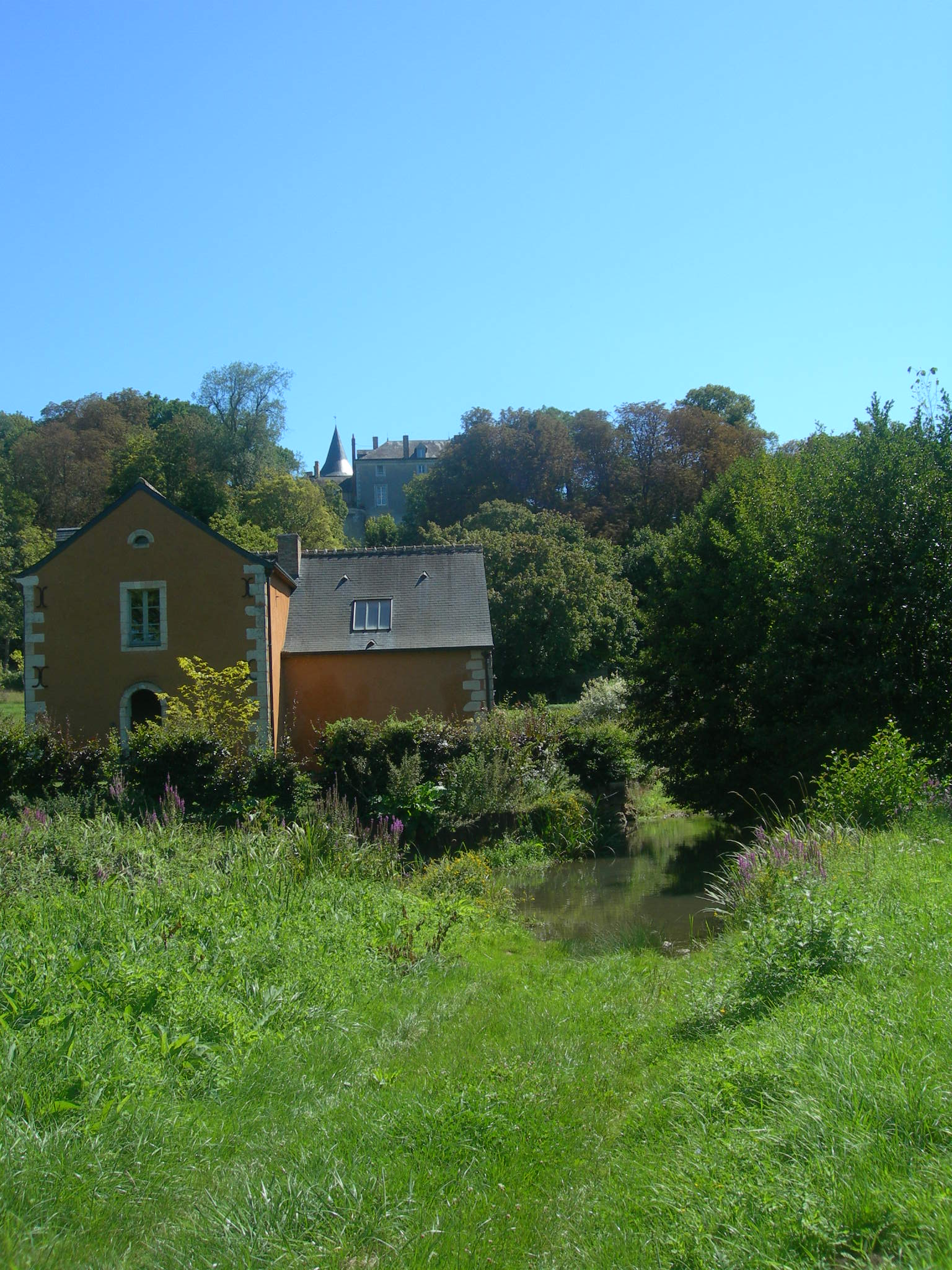
- Mill and château of Courcillon
- Location of Dissay-sous-Courcillon
- Location within France Location within Pays de la Loire
- Coordinates: 47°39′55″N 0°28′24″E
- Country: France
- Region: Pays de la Loire
- Department: Sarthe
- Arrondissement: La Flèche
- Canton: Montval-sur-Loir
- Intercommunality: Loir-Lucé-Bercé

Government
  - Mayor (2020–2026): Gérard Richard
- Area^{1}: 34.92 km^{2} (13.48 sq mi)
- Highest elevation: 132 m (433 ft)
- Lowest elevation: 43 m (141 ft)
- Population (2023): 966
  - Density: 27.7/km^{2} (71.6/sq mi)
- Time zone: UTC+01:00 (CET)
  - Summer (DST): UTC+02:00 (CEST)
- INSEE/Postal code: 72115 /72500
- ^{1} French Land Register data, which excludes lakes, ponds, glaciers > 1 km^{2} (0.386 sq mi or 247 acres) and river estuaries.

Dissay-sous-Courcillon (French pronunciation: [disɛ su kuʁsijɔ̃]) is a commune in the Sarthe department in the Pays de la Loire region in north-western France.

== See also ==
- Communes of the Sarthe department
