= Canton of Montval-sur-Loir =

Coordinates: 47.69°N 0.42°E

The canton of Montval-sur-Loir (before 2021: Château-du-Loir) is an administrative division of the Sarthe department, northwestern France. Its borders were modified at the French canton reorganisation which came into effect in March 2015. Its seat is in Montval-sur-Loir.

It consists of the following communes:

1. Beaumont-Pied-de-Bœuf
2. Beaumont-sur-Dême
3. Chahaignes
4. La Chartre-sur-le-Loir
5. Courdemanche
6. Dissay-sous-Courcillon
7. Flée
8. Le Grand-Lucé
9. Jupilles
10. Lavernat
11. Lhomme
12. Loir en Vallée
13. Luceau
14. Marçon
15. Montreuil-le-Henri
16. Montval-sur-Loir
17. Nogent-sur-Loir
18. Pruillé-l'Éguillé
19. Saint-Georges-de-la-Couée
20. Saint-Pierre-de-Chevillé
21. Saint-Pierre-du-Lorouër
22. Saint-Vincent-du-Lorouër
23. Thoiré-sur-Dinan
24. Villaines-sous-Lucé
