= Abadie (surname) =

Abadie is a French and English surname derived from the Occitan word abadia ("abbey"). Notable people with the surname include:

- Alberto Abadie (born 1968), Spanish economist
- Alejandro Abadie (born 1985), Argentine rugby union footballer
- Alfred C. Abadie (1878–1950), American photographer and pioneer filmmaker
- André Abadie (1934–2020), French rugby union player
- Ann J. Abadie (1939–2024), American scholar, editor
- Audrey Abadie (born 1992), French rugby union player
- Caroline Abadie (born 1976), French politician
- Claude Abadie (1920–2020), French jazz clarinetist and bandleader
- Elie Abadie (born 1960), Lebanese-American Senior Rabbi working in the United Arab Emirates
- Esteban Abadie (born 1997), French rugby union player
- Eugène Hilarian Abadie (1810–1874), U.S. Army surgeon in the American Civil War
- François Abadie (1930–2001), French politician
- Frank "Buddy" Abadie (1921–2002), American horse racing enthusiast and businessman
- Henri Abadie (born 1963), French racing cyclist
- Henry Richard Abadie (1841–1915), British army officer
- Jean Marie Charles Abadie (1842–1932), French ophthalmologist
- Jean-Paul Abadie (born 1958), French chef
- Jeanette Abadie (born c. 1593), French alleged witch
- Jérémy Abadie (born 1988), French professional footballer
- John Abadie (1854–1905), American baseball player
- Joseph Abadie (1873–1934), French neurologist
- Jules Abadie (1876–1953), French politician and surgeon
- Lisandro Abadie (born 1974), Argentine bass-baritone
- Paul Abadie Sr. (1783–1868), French architect
- Paul Abadie (1812–1884), French architect and building restorer
- René Abadie (1935–1996), French cyclist
- Simon Abadie (born 1978), French race car driver
- William Abadie (born 1977), French actor
