= Abadie =

Abadie may refer to:

- Abadie (surname)
- Abadie, on List of rolling papers
- Abadie's sign, a spasm of the levator palpebrae superioris muscle
- Abadie's symptom, an eponymous medical sign
