= Parcé-sur-Sarthe =

- Commune
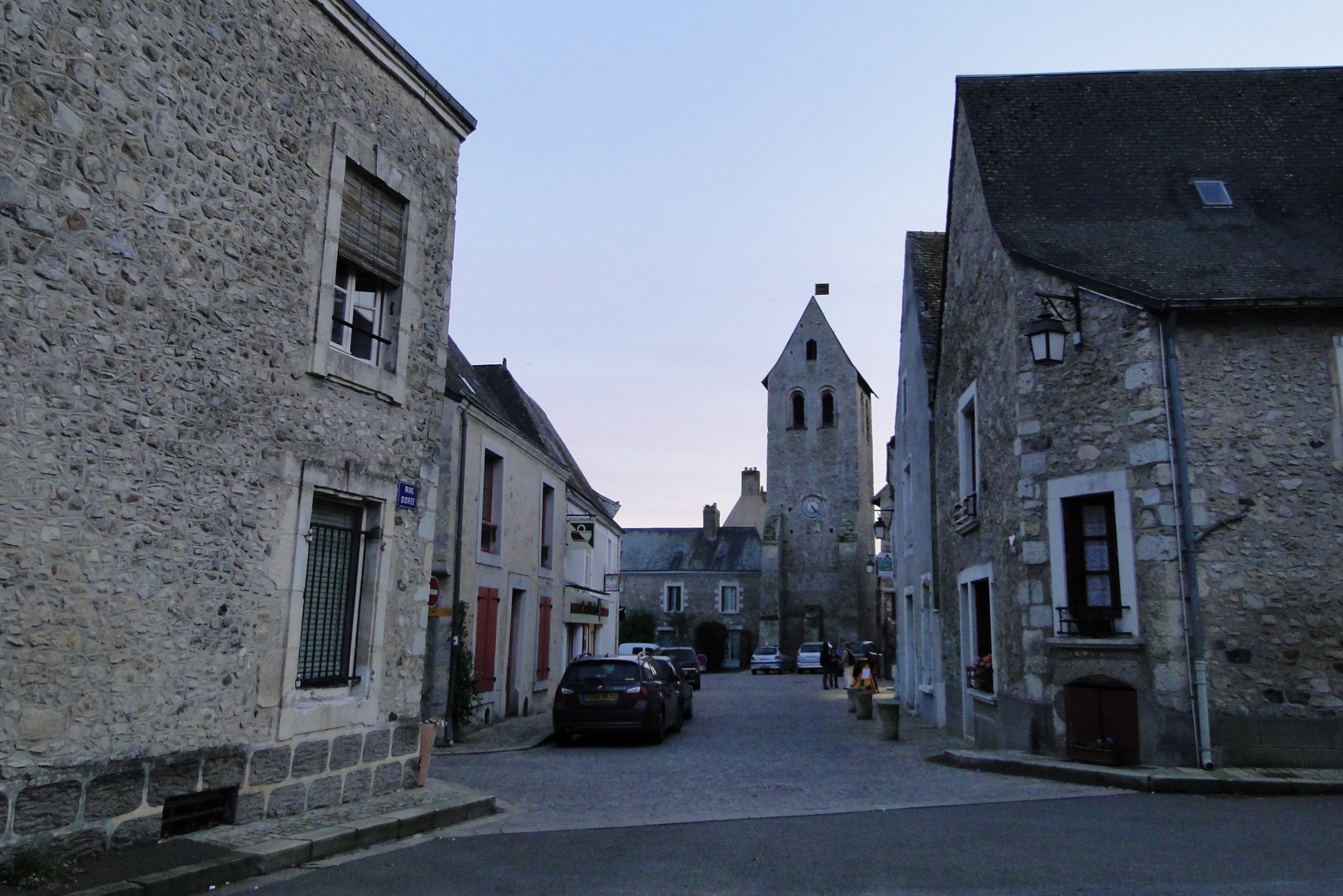
- The centre of Parcé-sur-Sarthe

- Coat of arms
- Location of Parcé-sur-Sarthe
- Location within France Location within Pays de la Loire
- Coordinates: 47°50′32″N 0°11′59″W
- Country: France
- Region: Pays de la Loire
- Department: Sarthe
- Arrondissement: La Flèche
- Canton: Sablé-sur-Sarthe
- Intercommunality: CC Pays Sabolien

Government
  - Mayor (2020–2026): Michel Gendry
- Area^{1}: 38.99 km^{2} (15.05 sq mi)
- Highest elevation: 57 m (187 ft)
- Lowest elevation: 26 m (85 ft)
- Population (2023): 1,950
  - Density: 50.0/km^{2} (130/sq mi)
- Demonym(s): Parcéen, Parcéenne
- Time zone: UTC+01:00 (CET)
  - Summer (DST): UTC+02:00 (CEST)
- INSEE/Postal code: 72228 /72300
- ^{1} French Land Register data, which excludes lakes, ponds, glaciers > 1 km^{2} (0.386 sq mi or 247 acres) and river estuaries.

Parcé-sur-Sarthe (French pronunciation: [paʁse syʁ saʁt], literally Parcé on Sarthe) is a commune in the Sarthe department in the region of Pays de la Loire in north-western France.

== Population ==
Historical population
Year	Pop.	±% p.a.
1968	1,160	—
1975	1,190	+0.37%
1982	1,432	+2.68%
1990	1,640	+1.71%
1999	1,810	+1.10%
2007	2,023	+1.40%
2012	2,141	+1.14%
2017	2,100	−0.39%
2023	1,950	−1.23%
Source: INSEE

== Personalities linked to the commune ==
- François Villon (1431-1463), poet, briefly imprisoned there as testified by a plaque.
- Claude Chappe (1763-1805), inventor of the semaphore telegraph. He made his first attempts passing messages between Brûlon and Parcé.
- Joseph-René Verdier (born 1819 in Parcé-sur-Sarthe - 1904), watercolourist and student of Auguste and Rosa Bonheur. His works include Étang au crépuscule, Petite Fille jouant avec un chien et Un Matin dans la lande (Musée du Mans).
- Marcel Pagnol (1895-1974), novelist, playwright and filmmaker, bought the Ignière mill in 1930, where he stayed, and which he sold twenty years later. Le Gendre de Monsieur Poirier was partly filmed in the region.
- François Dufeu (born in 1943 in Parcé), writer.

== See also ==
- Communes of the Sarthe department
