= Hôtel de Ville, Angoulême =

Town hall in Angoulême, France

Hôtel de Ville
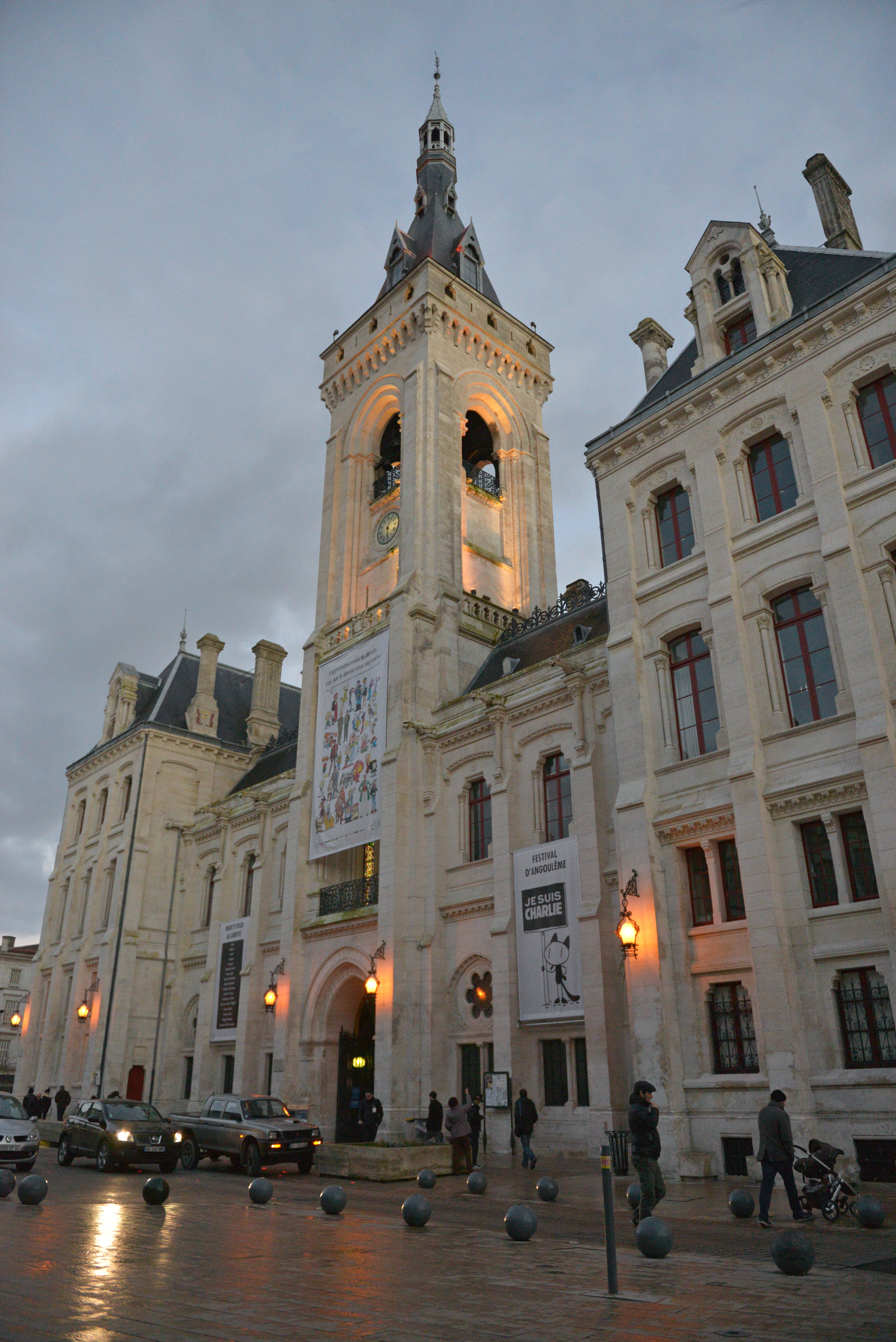
- The main frontage of the Hôtel de Ville in February 2015

General information
- Type: City hall
- Architectural style: Gothic Revival style
- Location: Angoulême, France
- Coordinates: 45.6485°N 0.1564°E
- Completed: 1870

Design and construction
- Architect: Paul Abadie

Monument historique
- Official name: Hôtel de ville
- Type: Inscrit
- Designated: 2013
- Reference no.: PA00104211

The Hôtel de Ville (French pronunciation: [otɛl də vil], City Hall) is a municipal building in Angoulême, Charente, western France, standing on Place de l'Hôtel de Ville. It was designated a monument historique by the French government in 2013.

== History ==
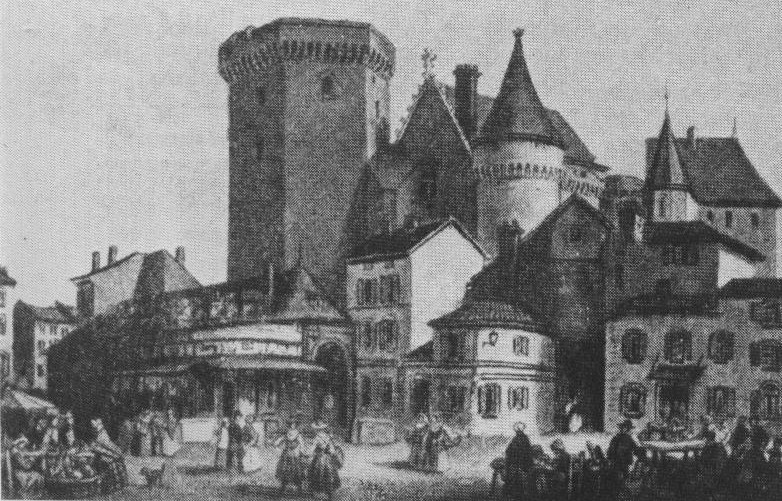
The old Château d'Angoulême

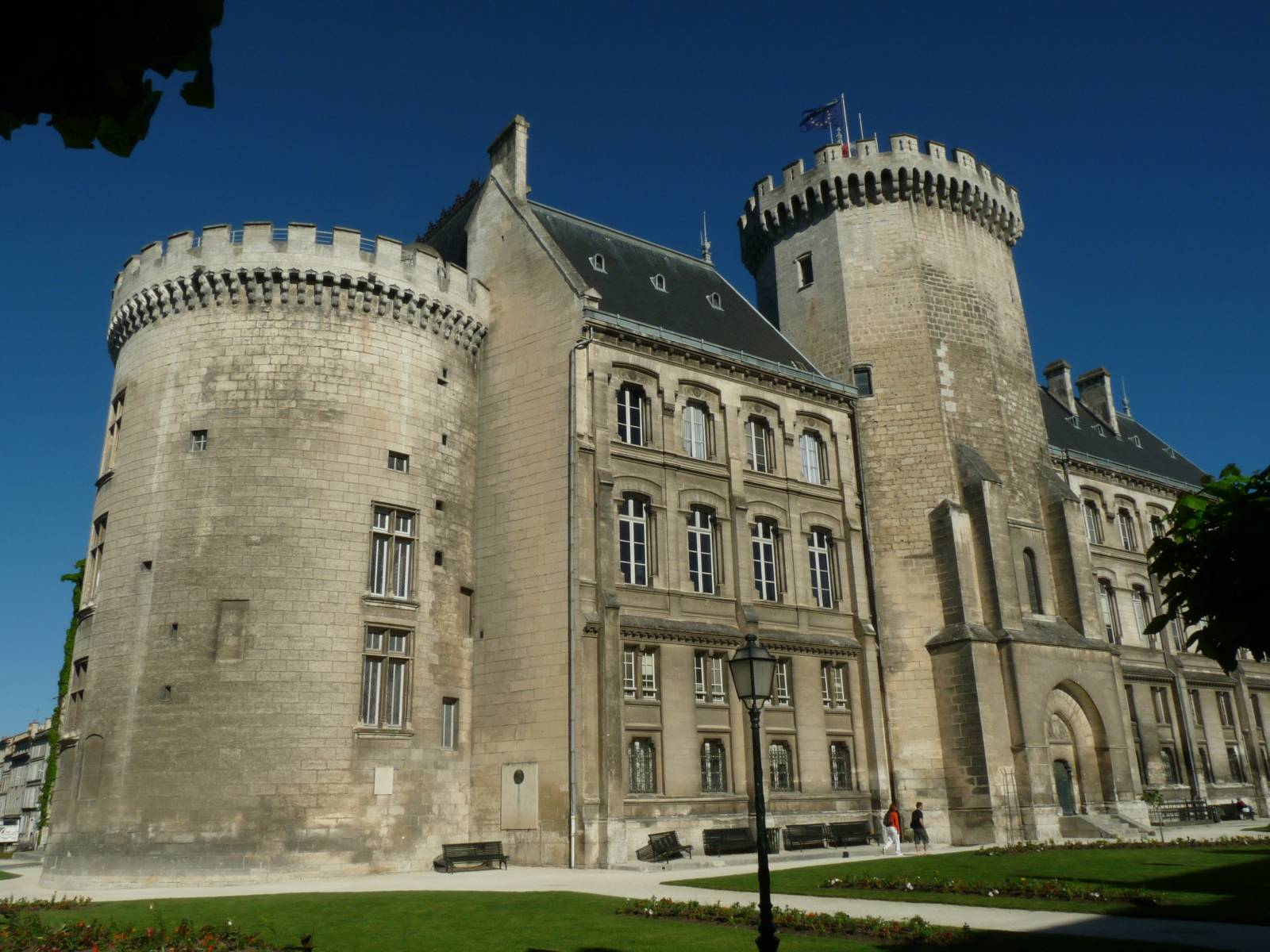
The east side of the complex with the Tour des Valois (on the left) and the Donjon des Lusignan (on the right)

=== Château d'Angoulême ===
The complex has its origins in the Château d'Angoulême which was erected on the site by Hugh X of Lusignan, who became count of Angoulême by virtue of his marriage to Isabella of Angoulême in 1220. The château was extended with the addition of a keep, known as the Donjon des Lusignan (Lusignan Keep), which was commissioned by Hugh XII of Lusignan and dominated the east side of the site from the late 13th century.

The château and surrounding lands were returned to the French Crown in 1308, and were then granted to Louis I, Duke of Orléans in 1394, before passing to John, Count of Angoulême in 1407 and to Charles, Count of Angoulême in 1467. Charles was a son of Charles V of France and, as such a member of the ruling Valois family. The complex was extended by the addition of a round tower, known as the Tour des Valois (Valois tower), which was commissioned by Charles, Count of Angoulême and erected at the southeast corner of the site in the late 15th century. The future Queen of Navarre, Marguerite de Navarre, who was the eldest child of Charles, Count of Angoulême and Louise of Savoy was born in the Tour des Valois in 1492.

When Charles died in 1496, he was succeeded by François of Angoulême and the château and surrounding lands were returned to the French Crown again, when Francis became King of France in 1515.

The château then became the residence of the governor of Angoumois. A later governor of Angoumois, Jean Louis de Nogaret de La Valette, gave refuge to the Dowager Queen, Marie de' Medici, at the château in 1619. A rift in the Royal family that existed at that time was settled by the Treaty of Angoulême, negotiated by Cardinal Richelieu, which reconciled Marie de' Medici to her son, Louis XIII.

In 1825, the Donjon des Lusignan became a Chappe telegraph station for communications between Paris and Bayonne.

=== Hôtel de Ville ===
The château continued to serve as the governor's residence until 1838, when the municipal council led by the mayor, Paul Joseph Normand de La Tranchade, proposed that the council acquire the site for a new town hall. The site was purchased by the council in 1842 and the old buildings were demolished, except for the Donjon des Lusignan and the Tour des Valois which were retained. Construction work on the new building started in 1858. It was designed by Paul Abadie in the Gothic Revival style, built in ashlar stone and was officially opened by the prefect of Charente, Leonide Babaud-Laribière, on 6 September 1870.

The design involved a symmetrical main frontage of 13 bays facing north onto the newly established Place de l'Hôtel de Ville with the last three bays on either end projected forward. The central bay, which was slightly projected forward, featured a three-stage tower: there was a double height arched carriage entrance in the first stage, a cross-window surmounted by an arch containing a relief depicting Charles V of France in the second stage, and a clock and a belfry in the third stage. The whole structure was surmounted by a roof lantern. The wings were fenestrated by bi-partite windows on the ground floor, by multi-sided foils enclosed in arches on the first floor, and by windows with ogee-shaped heads on the second floor. The end sections were fenestrated in a similar style but benefited from an extra floor. Internally, the principal rooms were the Salle du Conseil (council chamber) and the Salle de Bal (ballroom).

Following the liberation of Angoulême on 1 September 1944, during the Second World War, the French tricolour flag, was hoisted on the belfry of the building. In August 2024, a man suffering from mental health issues initiated an attack on the building: he was shot and seriously injured by armed police.

== See also ==
- List of castles in France
