= Chappe telegraph =

Early optical telegraph system

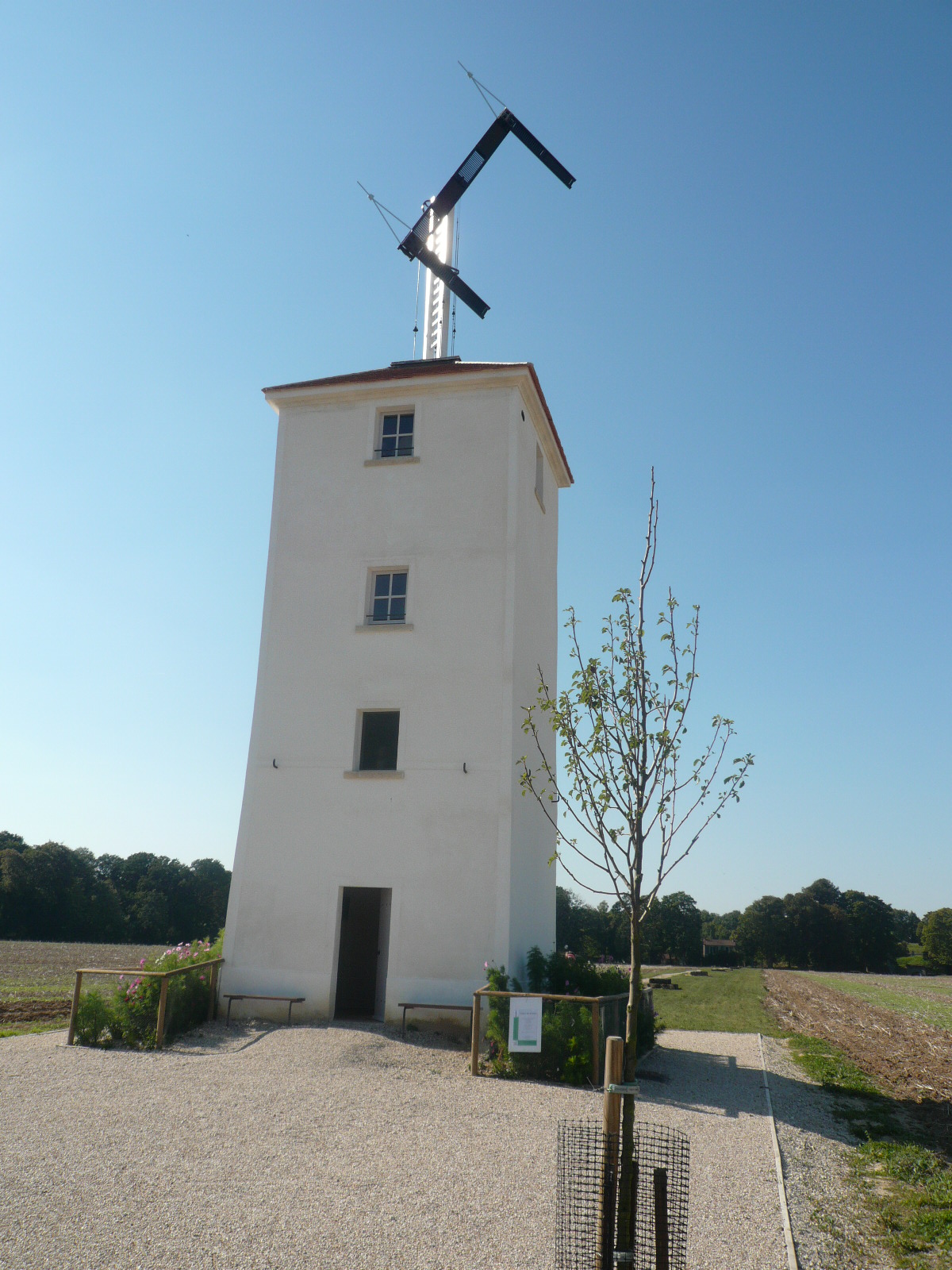
A restored Chappe telegraph in Marly-le-Roi, 2008

The Chappe telegraph was a French semaphore telegraph system invented by Claude Chappe in the early 1790s.

The system was composed of towers placed every 5 to 15 kilometres (3 to 9 miles). Coded messages were sent from tower to tower, with transmission being handled by tower operators using specially designed telescopes. The messages were decoded once they reached their destination city. By the mid 19th century, the network spanned several hundred kilometres and covered most major French cities as well as Venice, Mainz and Amsterdam.

The system was replaced by the Foy–Breguet telegraph and dismantled. Today, about twenty Chappe towers remain, in varying states of repair.

== Design ==
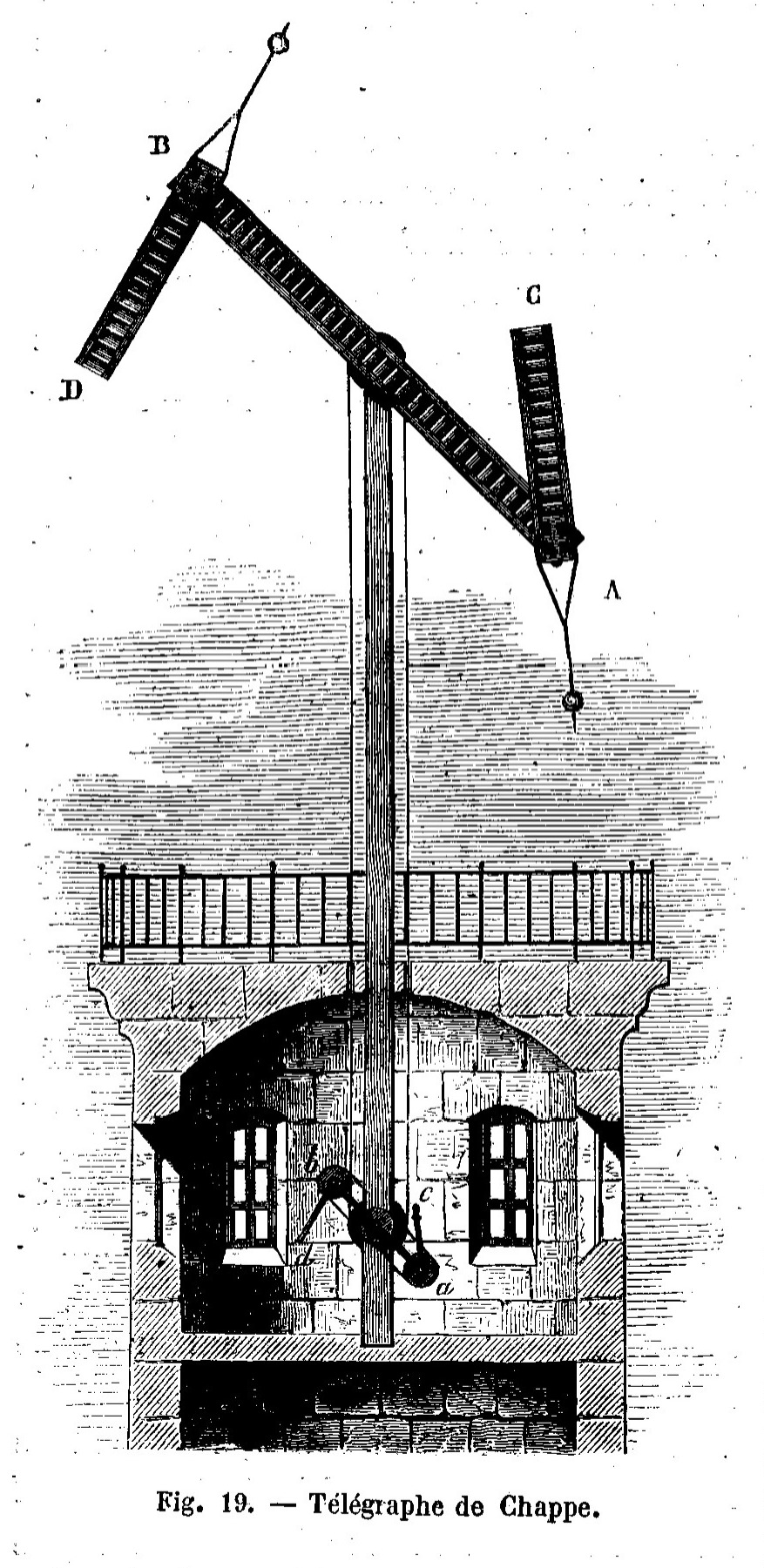
Diagram of a Chappe telegraph. The regulator is segment AB. The indicators are segments AC and BD. The mast is the vertical beam. At its base is the mechanical device (the manipulator), which the operator uses to form the signal and which reproduces it in miniature (segments ac and bd).

The Chappe telegraph system embodied varying designs, with the variation partly due to technological improvements made as the system was used.

=== Physical layout of the towers ===
The typical tower's signaling mechanism was visible through specially designed telescopes from a neighboring tower, 5 to 15 km away. The mechanism consisted of:

- a 7-metre (23 ft) sky blue mast, incorporating a ladder to access the moving parts and to carry out maintenance;
- the "regulator": a black main beam, 4.60 by 0.35 metres (15.1 by 1.1 ft)
- "indicators": two rotating black wings, 2 by 0.30 metres (6.56 by 0.98 ft);
- "ranges": gray counterweights for each indicator
- the "manipulator": a system of cables and return pulleys at the foot of the mast in the work room, which the operator used to produce the signal. The manipulator reproduced the state of the signaling mechanism in miniature so that the operators could see what they were doing;

The regulators and indicators had fixed louvres to reduce wind resistance.

=== Telescopes ===
Two telescopes were used in each tower to see the signals up- and downstream from that tower. They had magnifications between 30× and 65×, depending on the arrangement of the towers. Each telescope was mounted in a wooden housing that kept it fixed and focused on one of the neighbouring towers. This avoided the need to adjust the telescope for each message.

=== Coding and deciphering ===
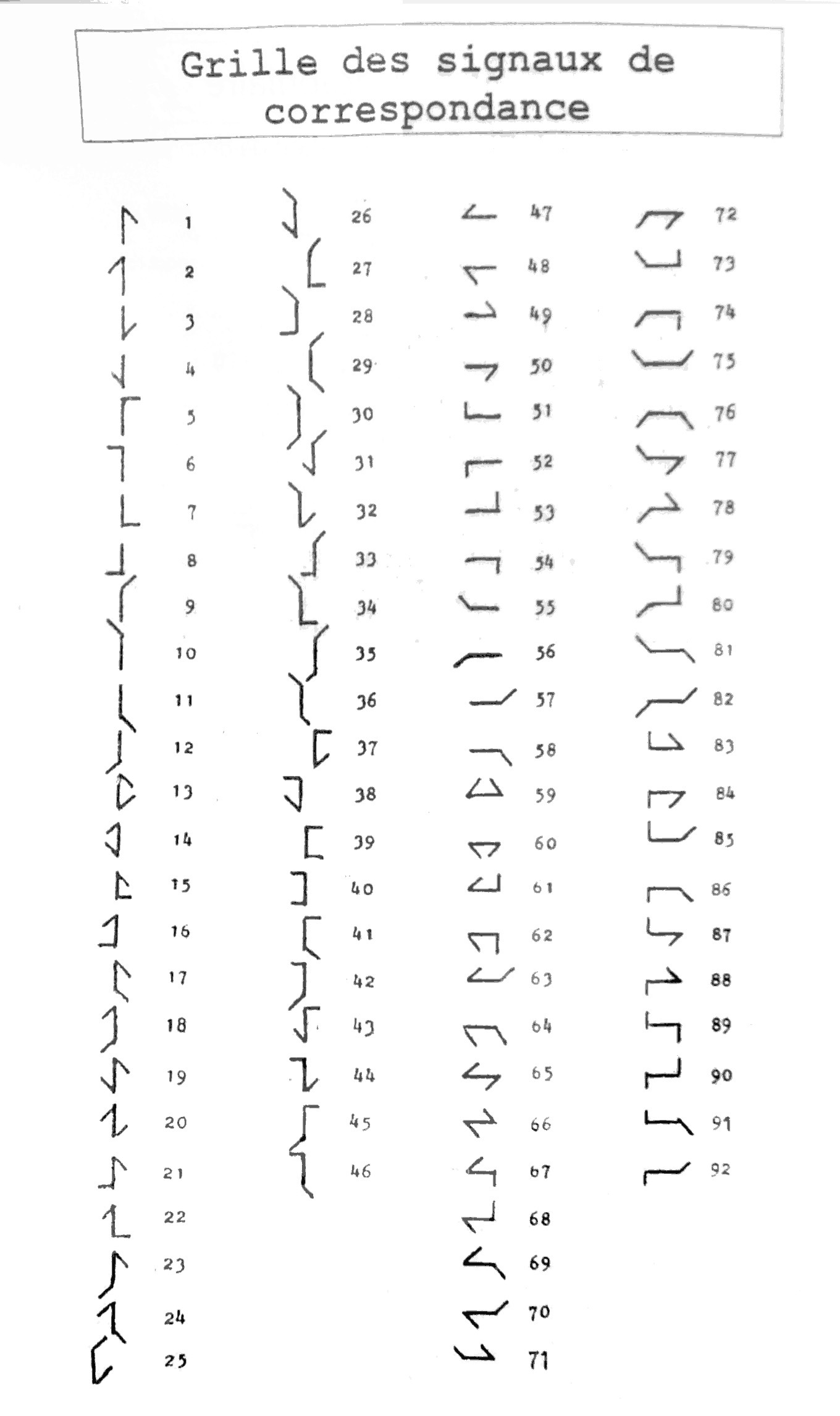
List of numerical values of Chappe signals. Document preserved in the museum of Saint-Marcan.

The code was based on different configurations of the moving parts of the telegraph. The regulator could take two positions (horizontal and vertical) and each of the indicators could take seven positions. Thus, the total number of possible signals was 2 × 7 × 7 = 98. Six of these signals were reserved for service purposes, for example to signal "end of message" or to indicate an error or the absence of an operator. This left 92 possible signals, each associated with a number, used to communicate the message itself. The telegraph configurations corresponding to each number (1–92) are shown in the image on the left.

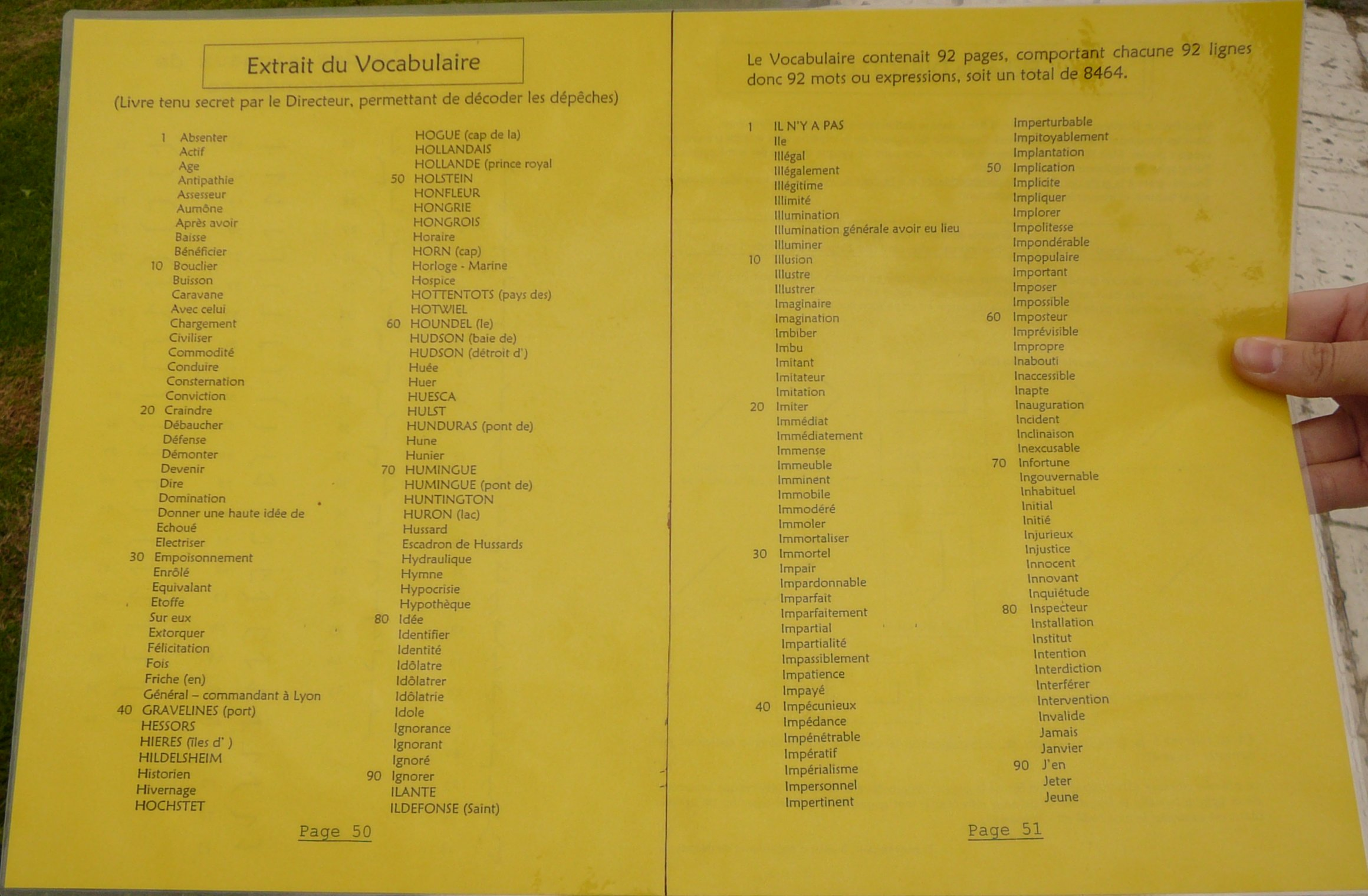
Page from the Chappe telegraph code book

The message was coded at the tower of origin using a code book and decoded at the destination tower using an identical book. The code book contained 92 pages, each of which contained 92 entries, each with a word, a series of related words, or an expression. Messages were composed of words and expressions from the 8464 (92 × 92) possible choices. For each word or expression, two symbols were transmitted; the first indicated the page number for the word or expression, and the second indicated the word's position on the code book's page. For example, as shown in the photo on the right, the code for "ignorance" would be (50, 87) since the word is on page 50 in position 87.

== History ==
Communication over long distances is a recurrent problem in history. This problem was particularly pressing in France at the height of the French Revolution, as the country was surrounded by the hostile forces of Britain, Austria, Prussia and the Netherlands. In this context, France would obtain strategic advantage if, unlike its enemies, it had a rapid system of reliable communication.

The telegraph Chappe provided just such a system of rapid and reliable communication. For example, sending a message carried by horses from Strasbourg to Paris took 4 days. With the Chappe telegraph, it took 2 hours.

Construction of the system began in the early 1790s and proceeded rapidly after that.

=== Invention ===
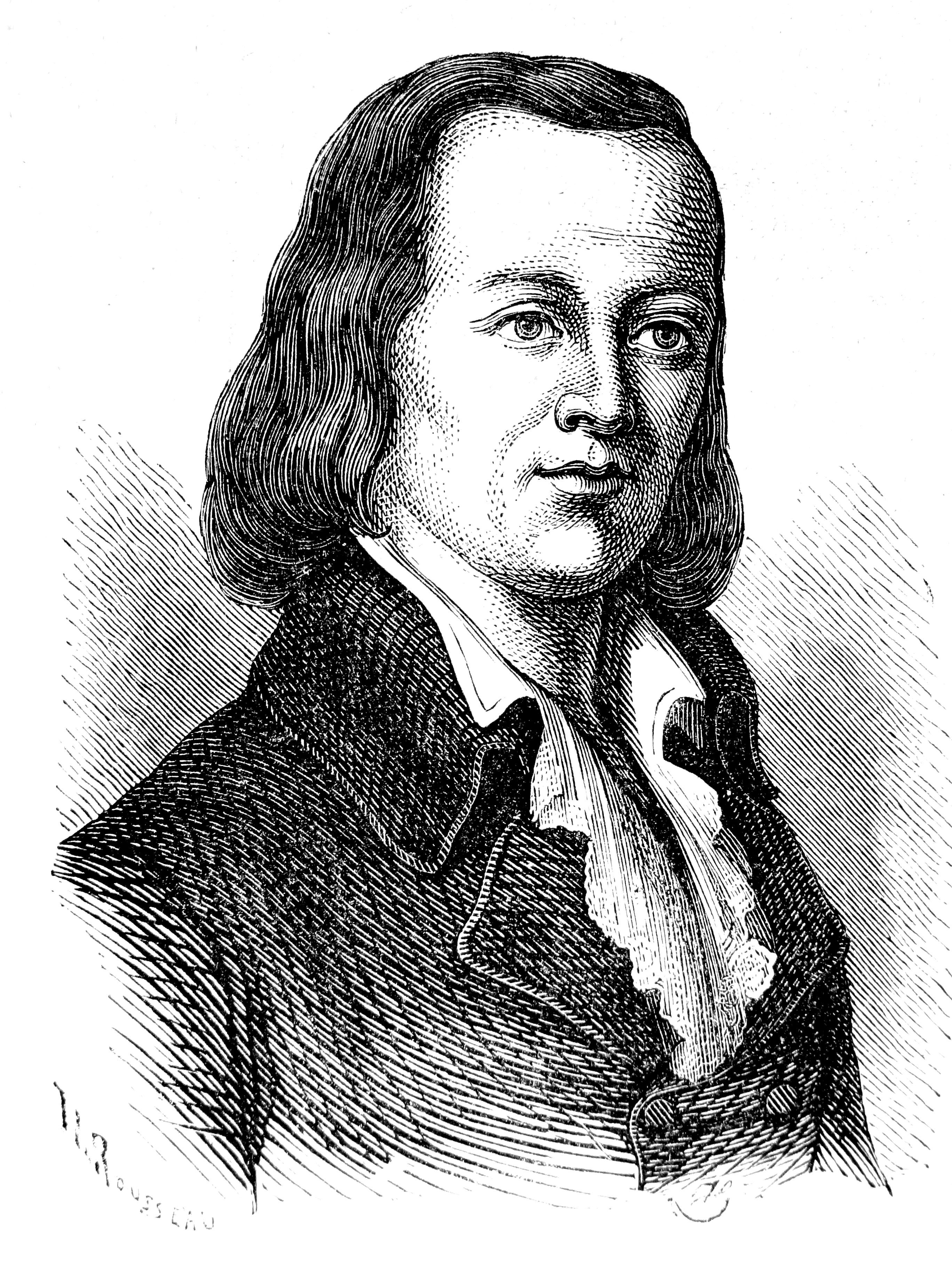
Claude Chappe, 1765–1828

In 1791, Chappe conceived a project that was to put "the government in a position to transmit its orders over a great distance in the least possible time". Having experimented with several solutions involving both sight and sound, he finally opted for the transmission of optical signs via a semaphore system with transmission effected by observation through a telescope. Chappe found experimentally that the angle of the moving pieces of the telegraph was easier to discern accurately at a distance than other characteristics of the towers or other sources of signal.

On 2 and 3 March 1791, Chappe tested an optical telegraph with a system of synchronized pendulums and a white and black optical panel between the cities of Brûlon and Parcé in the Loire region. He then transmitted the following message: "The National Assembly will reward experiences that are useful to the public."

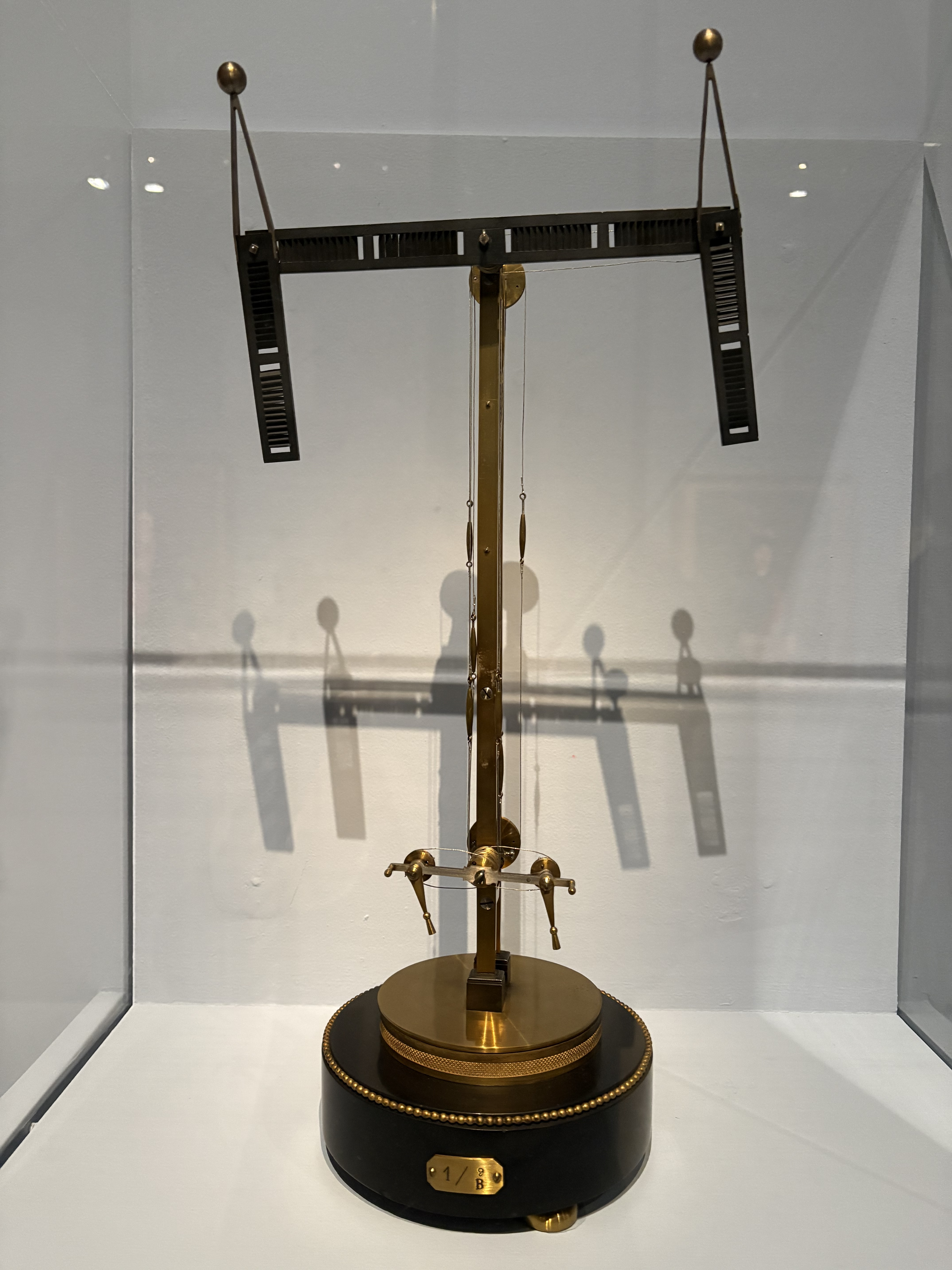
Model of Chappe telegraph that was shown to the Legislative Assembly by Chappe in April 1792

In June 1791, Chappe moved to Paris and carried out new experiments in Ménilmontant, on a site near what is now the rue du Télégraphe in the 20th arrondissement of Paris (this is the highest point in the city). Chappe and his associates then sought political support in order to install the system throughout France. On 22 March 1792 Chappe submitted a petition to the Legislative Assembly, in which he described his invention as "a reliable means of establishing a correspondence such that the legislative body can send its orders to our frontiers and receive the answer during the duration of the same session." On 1 April a report vaunting the military use of the telegraph was presented to the National Convention on behalf of the Committees for Public Instruction and War.

On 12 July 1793 a successful first test was carried out over a distance of 26 km, between Ménilmontant, Écouen and Saint-Martin-du-Tertre (in the Val-d'Oise, near Paris). On 25 July Chappe was appointed telegraph engineer by decree. After a convincing presentation by Joseph Lakanal in support of the project, the National Convention approved the construction of the Paris-Lille telegraph line on 4 August 1793. In a letter sent the following day, Chappe described the benefits of the system for the political unification of France as follows:

The establishment of the telegraph is, in fact, the best response to authors who think that France is too large to form a Republic. The telegraph shortens distances and somehow unites an immense population at a single point.

=== Construction ===
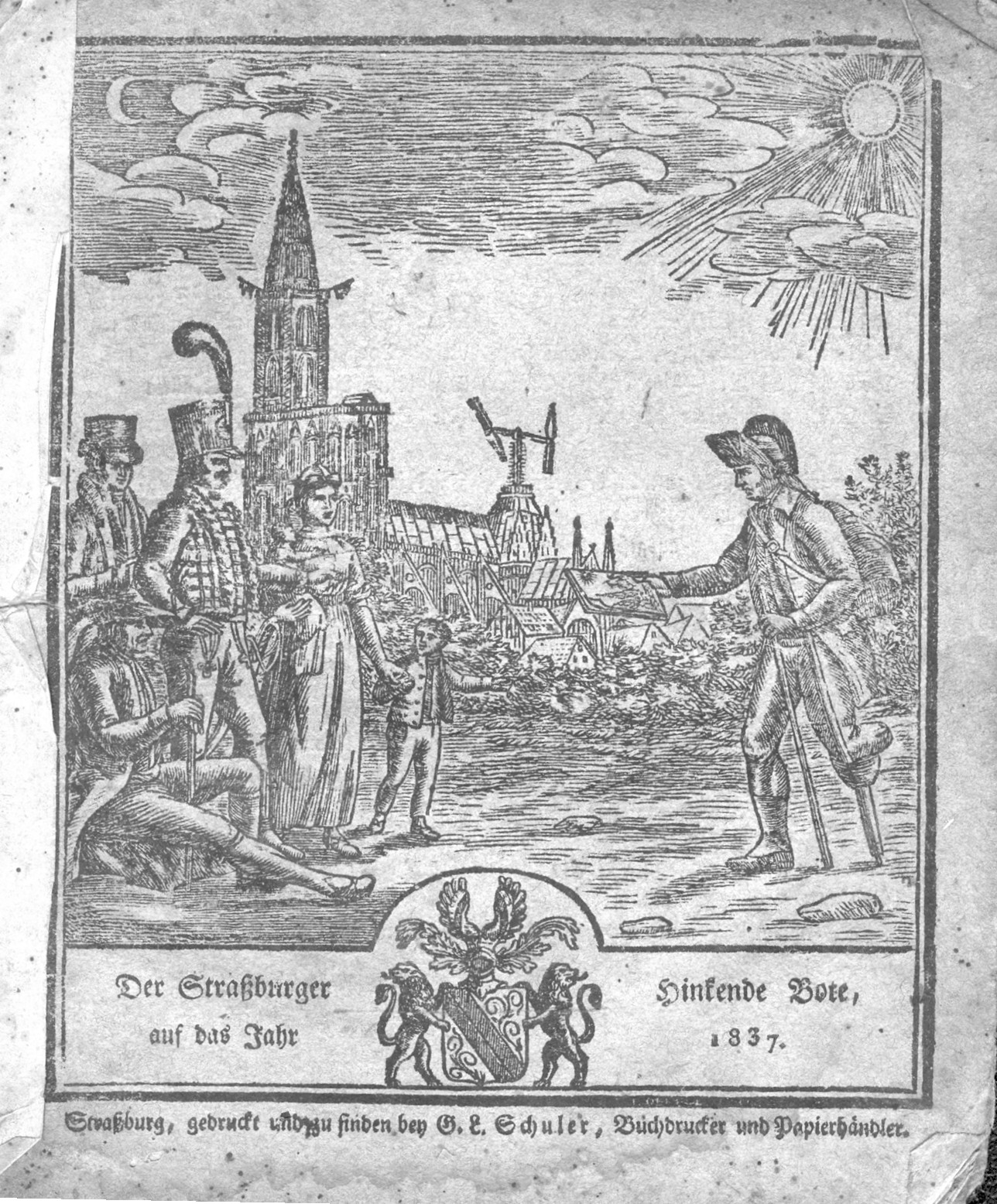
Cover of an Alsatian almanac from 1837, showing the Strasbourg cathedral with a Chappe telegraph on its roof.

The first Chappe telegraph line was a series of towers linking Paris and Lille, a distance of 230 kilometres. The Paris-Lille line was operational for military purposes only. Its fifteen towers made it possible to transmit a short message between these two cities within 9 minutes. Later developments added the major French cities, with Paris being the central node of the system. Between Paris and Brest in Brittany, 58 stations dotted the route. In addition to Paris-Lille in 1794, other cities initially served were: Strasbourg in 1798 and Brest in 1799. By 1844, 534 towers criss-crossed French territory, linking the 29 most important cities and covering more than 5,000 km.

The network was also extended in Europe as far as Amsterdam, Mainz and Venice. The line spread to North Africa when the French decided to build a telegraph line from Algiers. It covered (Algiers-Oran and Algiers-Constantine in 1853) and Tunisia (Tunis-La Goulette and Tunis-Mohamedia in 1848–1849).

Originally, the mechanisms were built by the workshops of the central administration in the premises of the administration of the telegraph. From 1833 onwards, they were built in Paris in a workshop. This workshop specialised in the manufacture of telegraphs and other machines and was located at 882, passage du Désir, faubourg Saint-Denis in what is now the 10th arrondissement of Paris.

The telescopes used in the system were originally produced in England, but were very expensive. The government encouraged the development of French production capabilities, which eventually replaced English sources.

=== Management and personnel ===
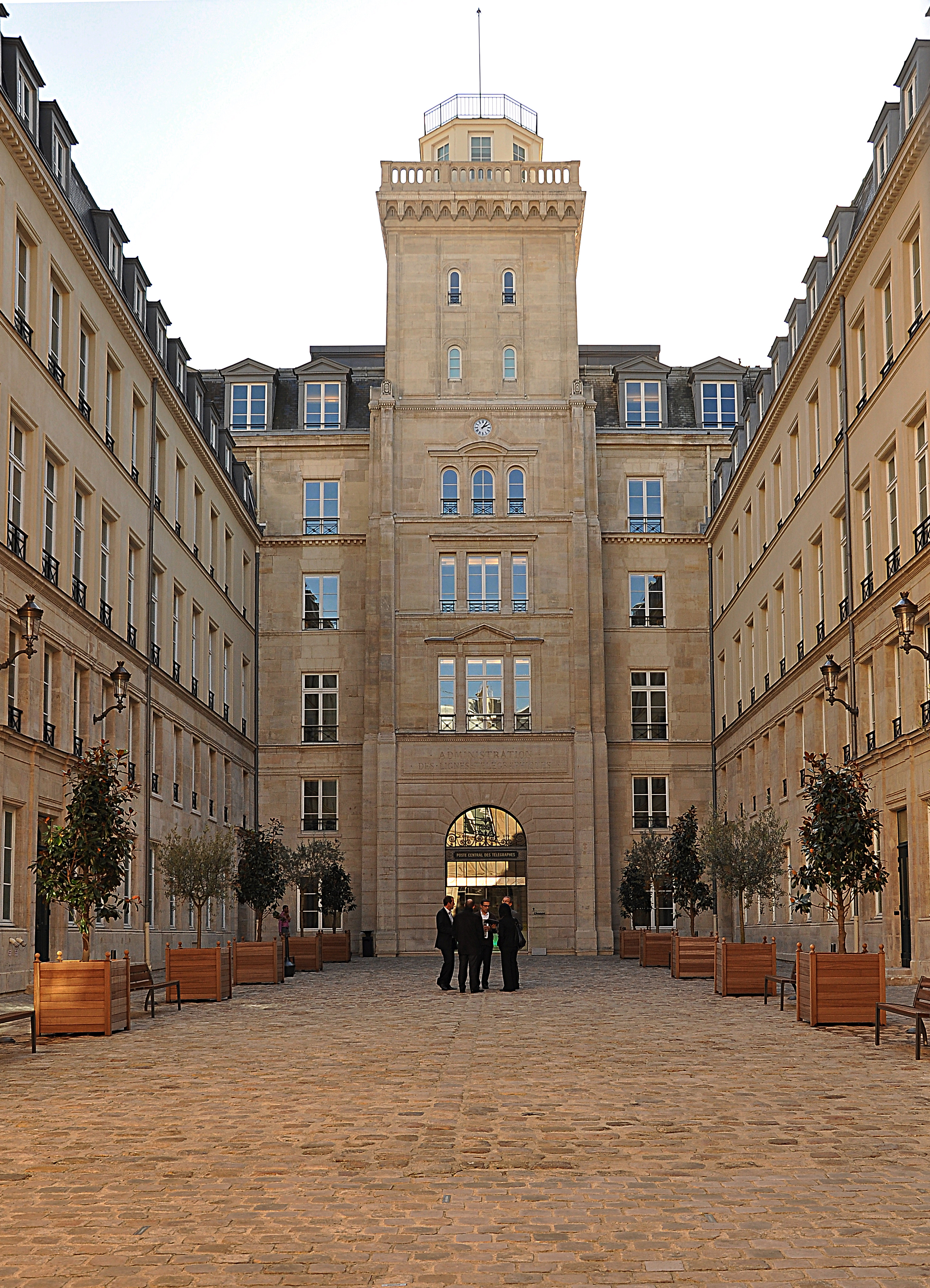
A Chappe tower at 103, rue de Grenelle in the 7th arrondissement of Paris

Originally, the system was managed by Claude Chappe and his brothers. This family-based system lasted until the July Monarchy in 1830, after which it was replaced by an administrative system that was both hierarchical and military in style. Under it, three top administrators managed four departments (messaging, personnel, plant and equipment, and accounting). The headquarters were located in the 7th arrondissement of Paris.

At the operational level, directors were responsible for coding, decoding, distributing and entering telegraph dispatches. Below them, inspectors were tasked with overseeing groups of about ten towers, including keeping the plant and equipment in good working order, supervising the tower operators, identifying the source of transmission errors and sanctioning operators for poor performance. The inspectors used military telescopes to observe and evaluate the performance of individual towers.

The tower operators accounted for more than 90 percent of the system's personnel. Originally, each tower had two operators, one for reading the signals and the other for manipulating the transmission mechanism. The operators did not have the code book needed to decipher the signals. Operators also had to verify that the next tower down the line did not make a mistake when retransmitting the message. The operators worked 365 days per year, were sanctioned for mistakes and were paid the same wages as a construction day-worker. Later, because of funding problems, often only one operator was assigned to each tower.

=== Use and misuse ===
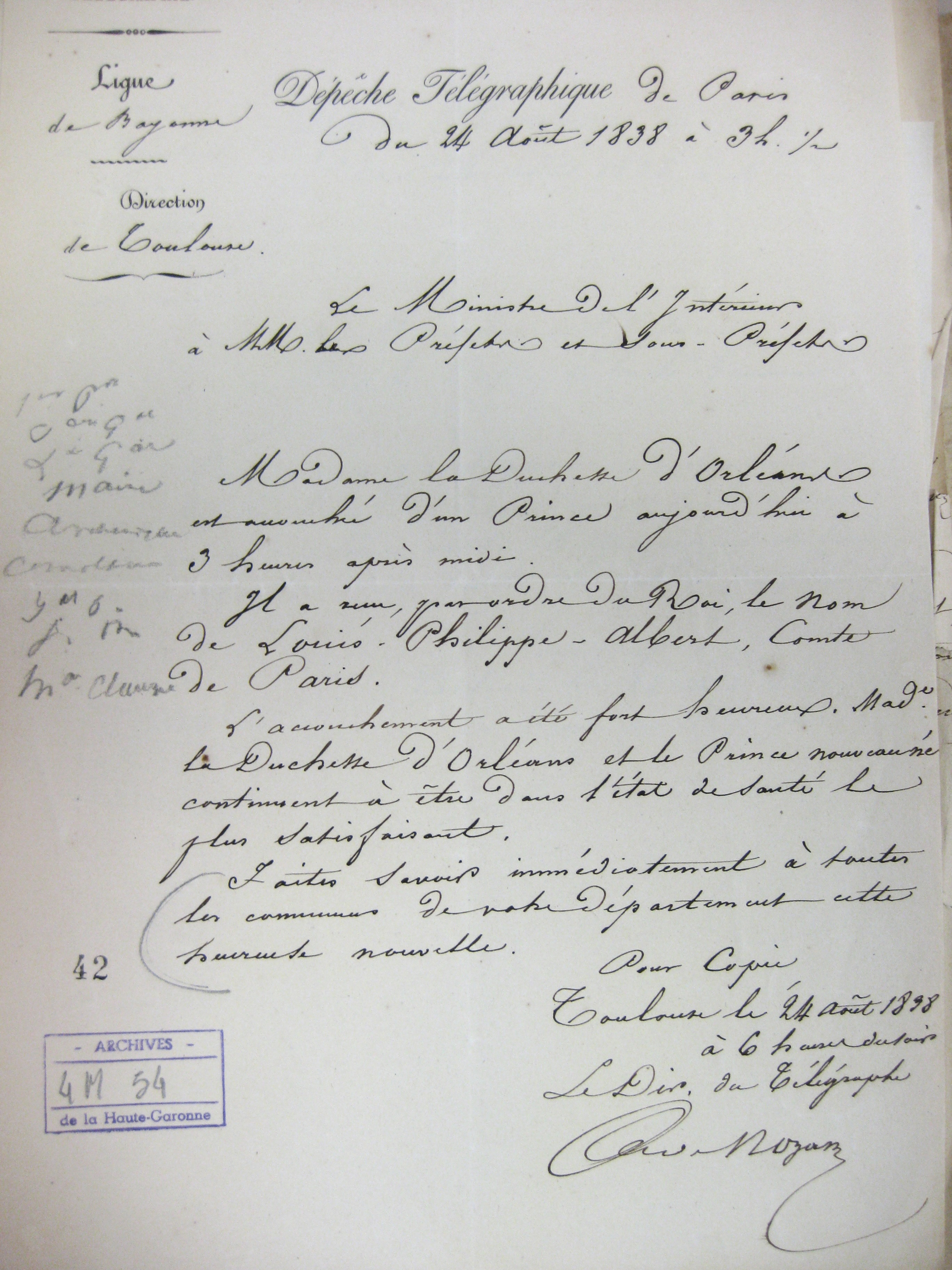
A Chappe Telegraph dispatch sent on 24 August 1838 from Paris to Toulouse announcing the birth of the first son of the Duc d'Orléans. The message was transmitted in two and a half hours.

The towers were effective in allowing news to travel quickly around France. The first military use of the system was made to report the recapture from Austrian forces of the cities of Le Quesnoy on 15 August 1794 and the town of Condé-sur-l'Escaut on 30 August 1794. The news of these victories was known by the National Convention in Paris within a few minutes.

Private parties also took steps to profit from the rapid communications offered by the Chappe telegraph. Between 1834 and 1836, the telegraph was used by two Bordeaux businessmen, the brothers François and Louis-Joseph Blanc, to receive information on Paris Stock Exchange annuity prices before anyone else. This was discovered in 1836 and the two brothers spent time in jail awaiting trial but were ultimately found not guilty because there was no law against this behaviour. However, they did have to pay a fine for bribing some of the telegraph operators.

=== Decline ===
The Chappe telegraph system continued to be used for decades, but its decline began when the first electric telegraph line, based on International Morse code, was set up in 1845. The last signal from a Chappe telegraph was sent in 1854.

== Reception by French society ==
The first phases of construction of the system aroused the suspicions of the population. In several instances, the local telegraphs were destroyed during popular uprisings, possibly due to suspicions of witchcraft, but more probably in order to hinder government communications.

Many French writers of the time featured the telegraph in their writings (Hugo, Dumas, Chateaubriand, Stendhal, Flaubert). Alexandre Dumas incorporated it into his novel The Count of Monte Cristo, with the Count pirating the system (through bribery) in order to undermine the financial position of one of his enemies. Victor Hugo described his horror at discovering, while traveling in Normandy in 1836, that the statue of the Archangel on the pinnacle of the steeple of the abbatial church of Mont Saint Michel had been replaced by a Chappe telegraph.

== See also ==
- Optical communication
