= Great Synagogue of Bordeaux =

Sephardic synagogue in Bordeaux, France

- French: Grande synagogue de Bordeaux
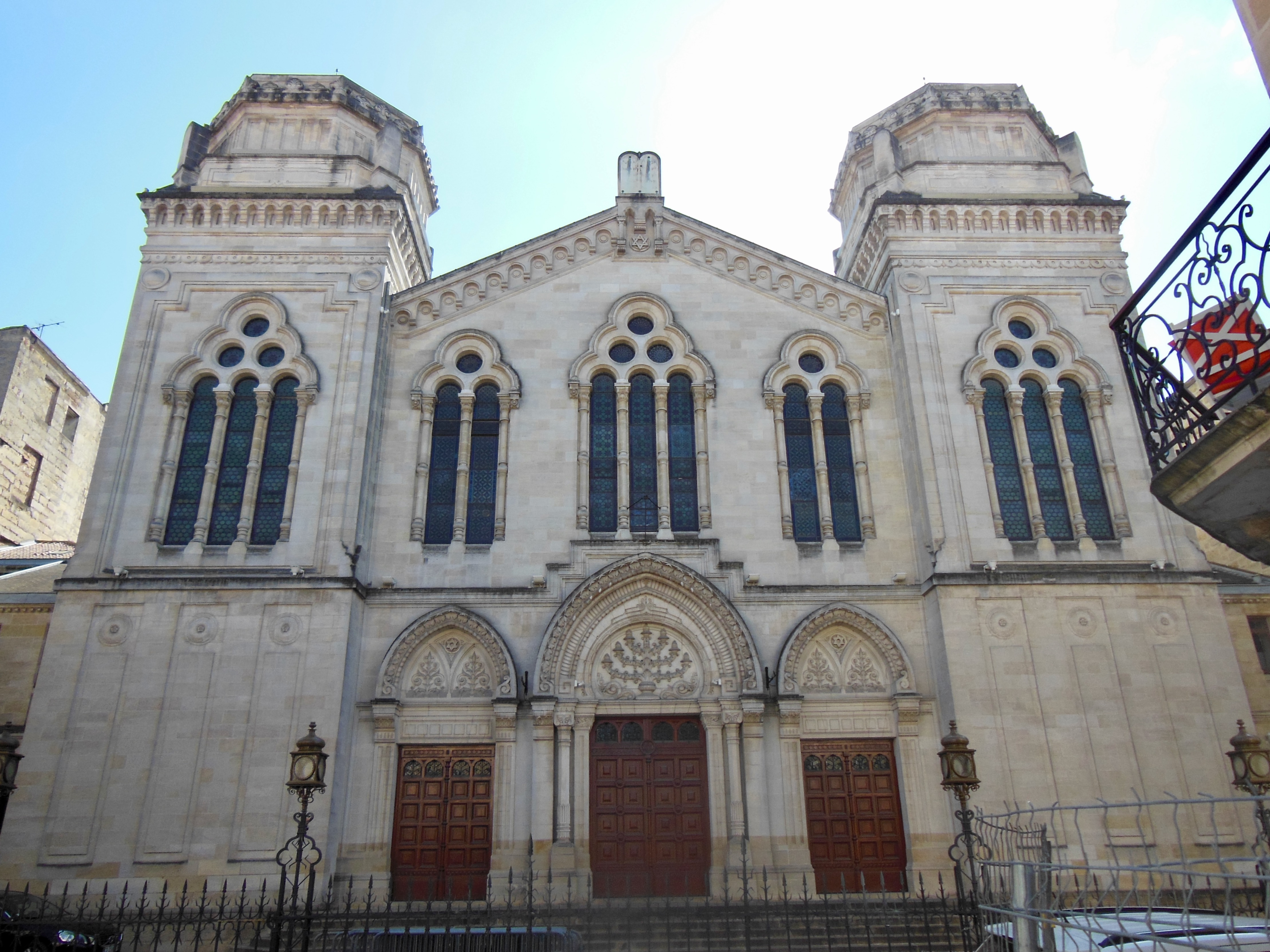
- The synagogue façade in 2012

- Location of the synagogue in France

Religion
- Affiliation: Judaism
- Rite: Nusach Sefardi Portuguese
- Ecclesiastical or organizational status: Synagogue
- Status: Active

Location
- Location: 6 Rue du Grand Rabin Joseph Cohen, Bordeaux, Gironde, Nouvelle-Aquitaine région
- Country: France
- Interactive map of Great Synagogue of Bordeaux
- Coordinates: 44°50′01″N 0°34′26″W

Architecture
- Architects: 1812: Armand Corcelles; 1882: Charles Bruguet; Charles Durand; Paul Abadie
- Type: Synagogue architecture
- Style: 1812: Moorish Revival; 1882: Romanesque Revival; Byzantine Revival
- Funded by: Pereire family (1882)
- Established: c. 1790 (as a congregation)
- Completed: 1812 (destroyed by fire); 1882 (current building)
- Construction cost: FF 660,000 (1882)
- Materials: Brick

Monument historique
- Official name: Synagogue
- Type: base Mérimée
- Criteria: Patrimoine architectura
- Designated: 20 July 1998
- Reference no.: PA00083914

The Great Synagogue of Bordeaux (French: Grande synagogue de Bordeaux; Occitan: Granda Sinagòga de Bordeu) is a Sephardic Jewish congregation and synagogue, located at 6 Rue du Grand Rabin Joseph Cohen, in Bordeaux, Gironde, in the Nouvelle-Aquitaine région of France.

== History ==
Sephardic Jews first fled to Bordeaux from the Iberian Peninsula following the Alhambra decree in 1492. Their religion was prohibited by several local decrees including in 1734. Following the Declaration of the Rights of Man adopted on August 26, 1789 during the French Revolution, discrimination against citizens was prohibited. In 1790 a partial decree stipulated that Portuguese (Sephardic) Jews were granted citizenship status, and the emancipation of all Jews in France was achieved the following year.

=== 19th century ===
A Neoclassical synagogue building was completed in 1812 as the first major synagogue built after Napoleon emancipated France's Jews. In 1873, this building was destroyed by fire.

A new synagogue, designed by Charles Bruguet, with the input of Charles Durand and Paul Abadie, and engineering by Gustave Eiffel, was completed in 1882 on a new site. Costing 660,000 French francs, the building was financed by donations, including significant contributions from the Pereire family, who were bankers, as well as from local and national government. The new synagogue was France's biggest synagogue when it was opened. The building combines Romanesque Revival and Byzantine Revival styles. There are two towers on the façade, similar to bell towers on church façades; some contemporary Jews criticised the design for looking too much like a church, and refused to give funding for the towers to be topped with bulbs. At the top of the façade there is a sculpture of the Tablets of Stone bearing the Ten Commandments.

=== 20th century ===
During the German occupation of France in World War II, Jews were interned at the synagogue before being deported to concentration camps; the building was then pillaged. After the war, restoration took place and the building returned to its original plan in 1956. The synagogue became the largest Sephardic synagogue in France.

The number of Jews in Bordeaux grew significantly during the 1960s, as Jews who lived in the French colonies in North Africa fled from the newly decolonised Arab and Muslim states that were less tolerant of Judaism.

On 20 July 1998, the synagogue was classed as a monument historique.

== See also ==
- History of the Jews in France
- List of synagogues in France
