= Paul Abadie Sr. =

French architect

Paul Abadie Sr. was a French architect born in Bordeaux (22 July 1783 - 3 December 1868). He was the father of architect Paul Abadie.

== Biography ==
The son of a construction artisan, Abadie Sr. began studying architecture in the atelier of Bonfin, later continuing in the offices of architects Charles Percier and Pierre-François-Léonard Fontaine. He also attended the École nationale supérieure des Beaux-Arts in Paris.

He was first employed as an inspector at the construction site of the stairway of the Palais du Louvre, executed by Percier and Fontaine. He later continued at the finance ministry on Rue de Rivoli. He then worked for the architect Bonnard.

In 1818, Paul Abadie moved to Angoulême as architect of the Charente. He was city architect of Angoulême from 1820 until 1840.

In 1836, Abadie became a member of the Legion of Honour.

In 1849, he was joined by his son Paul Abadie, when the latter was named diocesan architecte of Angoulême, Perigueux et Cahors.

He was confirmed in his posts in 1854 and eventually resigned in 1864.

== Main works ==
=== In Angoulême ===
- Palais de justice, 1828,
- Hôtel de la préfecture, completed 1832,
- néo-Grecian portal of Saint-André Church, 1825,
- the abattoirs,
- Fassade of the notary offices in the castle of Angoulême,
- the prison,
- Guez de Balzac school, (completed by his son,)
- Church of Saint-Jacques de l'Houmeau, completed in 1840,
- Enlargement of the Hôtel-Dieu from 1826 to 1828.

=== Elsewhere ===
- Second Prefecture of Ruffec,
- Court of Justice of Ruffec,
- the prisons in Ruffec and in Confolens,
- Hôtel Texier de la Peygerie in Barbezieux (Charente), 1825-1826,
- Protestant Church of Cognac, 1841,
- Protestant church of Jarnac, 1820, according to the plans of François Nicolas Pineau (1746-1823),
- Paper factory of Beauvais in La Couronne, 1839.
