= Abadie's sign of tabes dorsalis =

Clinical sign

Abadie's sign of tabes dorsalis is a medical sign of tabes dorsalis, a late consequence of neurosyphilis. It is elicited by compressing the Achilles tendon, which normally causes pain. A positive Abadie's sign is defined by the absence of pain. It may occur in any disease that damages the dorsal column–medial lemniscus pathway, which transmits sensory information from the periphery to the brain.

It is named for Joseph Louis Irenée Jean Abadie, a French neurologist.

== See also ==
- Abadie's sign of exophthalmic goiter
