= Jean Marie Charles Abadie =

French ophthalmologist

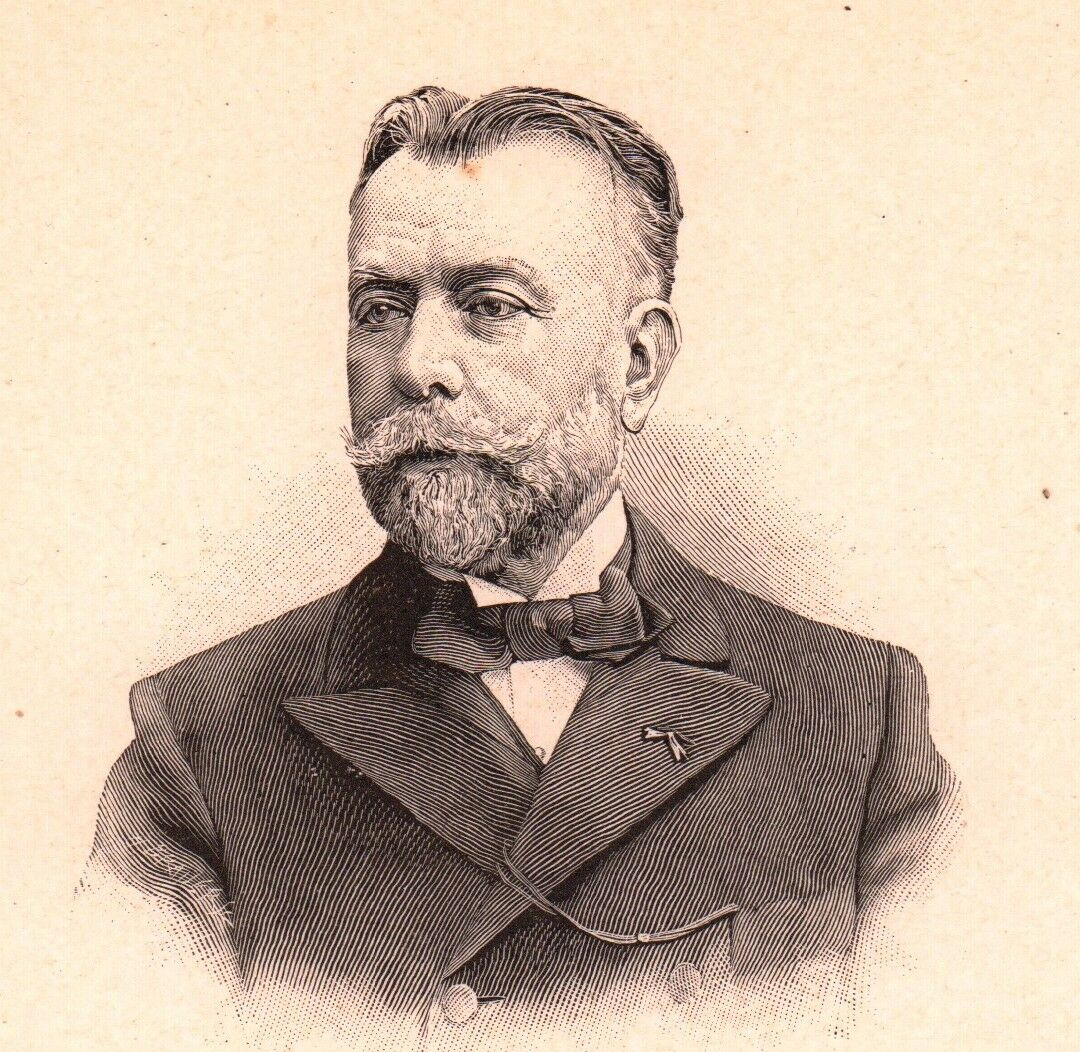
- Jean Marie Charles Abadie
- Born: 25 March 1842
- Died: 29 June 1932 (aged 90)
- Occupation: French ophthalmologist

Jean Marie Charles Abadie (25 March 1842 – 29 June 1932) was a French ophthalmologist who was a native of Saint-Gaudens.

He became a hospital intern in 1868 and a medical doctor in 1870. He practiced medicine at the Hôtel-Dieu de Paris. In 1881 he was made a chevalier of the Légion d'honneur.

Abadie was involved in developing treatments for glaucoma and trachoma, and discovered a diagnostic sign for exophthalmic goiter known as "Abadie's sign". He also introduced the practice of injecting alcohol into the Gasserian ganglion as a treatment for trigeminal neuralgia.

== Biography ==
He obtained his doctorate in medicine in 1870 and practiced at the Hôtel-Dieu, Paris. He was particularly interested in the treatment of Trachoma and Glaucoma and was the first to perform alcoholization of Trigeminal ganglion as a treatment for Trigeminal neuralgia.

He was awarded the Legion of Honour in 1981.

== Published works ==
- Spasmes des muscles de l'oeuil – Spasms of the eye muscles.
- Traité des maladies des yeux; Paris, 1876/1877 – On maladies of the eyes.
- Leçons de clinique ophthalmologique; Paris, 1881 – Lessons on clinical ophthalmology.
- Nouveau traitement de l'ophthalmie sympathique; Paris, 1890 – New treatment for sympathetic ophthalmia.

Also, he contributed numerous articles to the journals "Annales d'oculistique" and "Archives d’ophthalmologie".
