= Abadie's sign of exophthalmic goiter =

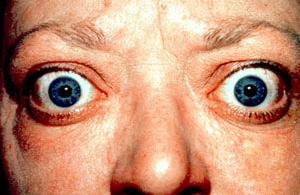
- Photo showing Abadie's sign of exopthalmic goiter in a man with Graves' disease
- Differential diagnosis: Graves-Basedow disease

Abadie's sign of exophthalmic goiter is a medical sign characterized by spasm of the levator palpebrae superioris muscle with retraction of the upper lid (so that sclera is visible above cornea) seen in Graves-Basedow disease which, together with exophthalmos causes the bulging eyes appearance.

It is named for Jean Marie Charles Abadie.

== See also ==
- Abadie's sign of tabes dorsalis
