= Frank "Buddy" Abadie =

American businessman

Personal information
- Nationality: American
- Born: January 8, 1921 New Orleans, Louisiana
- Died: August 11, 2002 (aged 81)
- Occupations: Horse racing fan and businessman
- Children: 1 daughter

Horse racing career
- Sport: Horse racing

Frank Albert "Buddy" Abadie (January 8, 1921 – August 11, 2002) was an American horse racing enthusiast and businessman.

A native of New Orleans, Louisiana, he spent the majority of his life devoted to horse racing. After spending time around circuits outside Louisiana, he returned home in 1968 and became director of the fledgling Louisiana Thoroughbred Breeders Association. His charges involved creating record systems, establishing a summer office in Lafayette, forming a trade publication and fighting legislative battles.

He was inducted into the Fair Grounds Racing Hall of Fame in 2000 and the Evangeline Downs "Frank A. "Buddy" Abadie Memorial Stakes" event is named in his honor.
