= Paul Abadie =

French architect and building restorer (1812-1884)

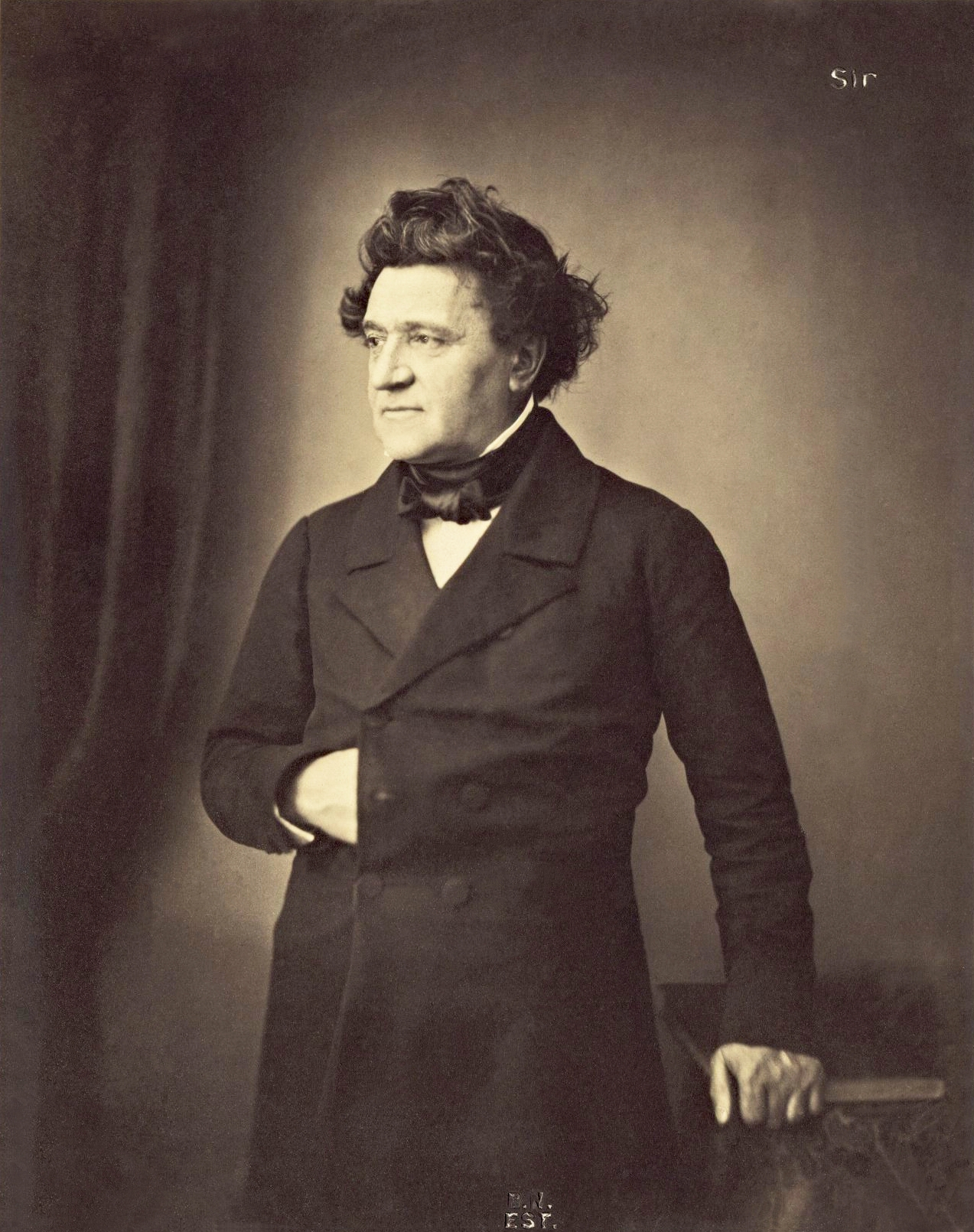
Paul Abadie

Paul Abadie (9 November 1812 – 2 August 1884) was a French architect and building restorer. He is considered a central representative of French historicism. He was the son of architect Paul Abadie Sr.

Abadie worked on the restoration of Notre-Dame de Paris, Église Sainte-Croix of Bordeaux, Saint-Pierre of Angoulême and Saint-Front of Périgueux. He won the competition in 1873 to design the Basilica of the Sacré Cœur on Montmartre in Paris, and saw construction commence on it, though he died long before its completion in 1914.

== Biography ==
Paul Abadie (Jr.) was born on 9 November 1812 in Paris, France. He was the son of Paul Abadie Sr., who was also an architect in France. He entered the School of Fine Arts (École des Beaux-Arts) in 1835; under the direction of the Monsieur Achille Leclère.

As attaché to the commission for historical monuments, he participated in the architectural rediscovery of the Middle Ages, touring and studying medieval sites intensively. Abadie was known to be interested in the restoration of medieval monuments and buildings; namely the Church of S. Front and the Cathedral of Angoulême. He also designed the Hôtel de Ville at Angoulême.

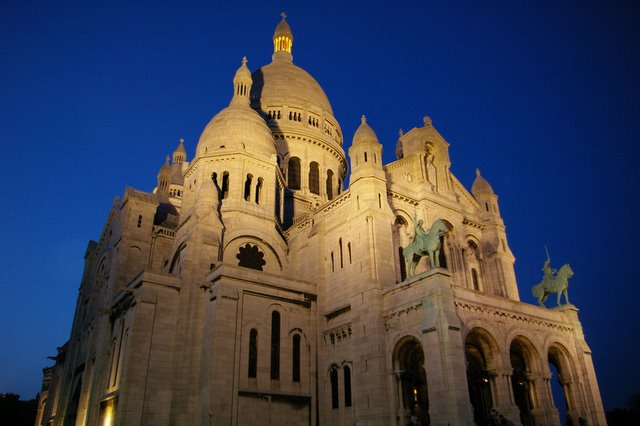
Basilique du Sacré-Cœur

In 1845 he became second inspector for the restoration of Notre-Dame de Paris, under the directorship of architects Violet le Duc and Lassus. In 1862 he was appointed as the diocesan architect for the Saint André Cathedral of Bordeaux, where he had already restored the facade of the church Saint-Croix (1859–1865).

In 1871 he became a member of the commission for historical monuments. In 1872 he became the general inspector of diocesan buildings, then in 1874 the diocesan architect for Paris, replacing Eugène Viollet-le-Duc, who had resigned from that post.

In 1873 his entry in the competition for the construction of a basilica on Montmartre, a hill dominating Paris, was selected ahead of 12 other submissions, by Cardinal Joseph Guibert. The design became the basis for the Sacré-Cœur, Paris, which Abadie began in 1875 but did not finish. In 1874 he replaced Viollet-le-Duc as architect of Notre Dame of Paris. In 1875, he was elected to membership of the Académie des Beaux Arts.

Apart from ecclesiastical and state commissions, Abadie is known to have accepted very few private commissions. The most substantial was Mailleberchie Castle, in 1875, which he designed in great detail, as a complete neo-medieval work of art, including stone carvings, gargoyles, stained glass windows, metalwork, wood carvings, furnishings, upholstery, wall fabrics and wallpapers. Around 1880 he also undertook the interior refurbishment of Maison Léon Croizet, a cognac merchant's residence in Saint-Même-les-Carrières, producing floor plans, interior woodwork designs, and drawings for the main entrance door; his sketches for the project are held at the Archives Départementales de la Charente.

Abadie began the Basilica of Sacré Cœur, but he died during its construction, on 3 August 1884, in Chatou, (departement of Yvelines), France.

== List of works ==
=== Constructions ===
- Basilica Sacré-Cœur, Paris, France
- Church of Chatou, France
- Neo-romanic Church of Saint-Georges of Mussidan, France
- Mailleberchie Castle, Villebois-Lavalette, France
- Maison Léon Croizet, Saint-Même-les-Carrières, France

=== Restorations ===
- Notre-Dame de Paris (initially under supervision of Viollet-le-Duc)
- Church Sainte-Croix Bordeaux Church
- Saint-Michel Tower, Bordeaux, France
- Saint-Ferdinand Church, Bordeaux, France
- Church of the Bastide (Église de la Bastide), Bordeaux, France
- Sacristy of the Saint-André Cathedral, Bordeaux, France
- Great Synagogue of Bordeaux, Bordeaux, France
- Saint Front Périgueux Cathedral, Périgueux, France
- Saint-Georges Church, Périgueux, France
- Saint-Pierre Abbey of Brantôme, France
- Angoulême Cathedral, Angoulême, France
- Saint-Étienne Cathedral, Cahors, France
- Saint-Léger Church, Cognac, France
- Château d'Angoulême, Angoulême, France
- Saint-Martial Church, Angoulême, France
- Sacré-Cœur, Paris, France

=== Other ===
- Grave monument for Jean-Louis Guez de Balzac, Hôtel Dieu (Chapel), Angoulême, France

== Legacy and influence ==
The work of Paul Abadie was not appreciated by some academics in the mid-twentieth century, as they felt he was fanciful, destroyed much Romanesque heritage, and had no compunction about adding whimsical sculptures of his own manufacture on capitals and corbels. An example of his willful implantations of false Romanesque sculpture is to be found in the clover-leaf church of St Michel d'Entraygues near Angoulême. Here, he has introduced a capital featuring a triple-headed Green Man with horns and a diabolical expression. Despite its intriguing shape, this small church has no connection with the Templars, but was built to receive pilgrims on the way to Compostela. Abadie's restoration works at Périgueux Cathedral and Angoulême Cathedral have been criticized for owing more to conjecture than historical accuracy.

However, from the 1980s onwards his life-work has been positively reevaluated, in particular due to his paramount role in the neo-medieval movement, recognizing within that movement his originality versus his contemporary, Viollet-le-Duc. Many communities in the present-day Charente and Dordogne departments are indebted to him for the restoration of a large number of ecclesiastical buildings, many that were in severe disrepair or simply neglected over centuries, for example in Angoulême, Périgueux, and Cahors, where from 1849 onwards he was the diocesan architect for those dioceses. His works, in particular Sacré Cœur, inspired many devotional and pilgrimage basilicas, for example the Basilica of the Sacred Heart, Brussels, (Koekelberg), 1919–1960, by Albert van Huffel, or the basilica Sainte-Thérèse de Lisieux, 1928–1954, by Louis-Marie Cordonnier. He also inspired a large number of churches, most notably in Paris (Saint-Esprit, 1928–1935, by Paul Tournon; Saint-Pierre-de-Chaillot, 1931–1938, by Émile Bois; and Sainte-Odile, 1934–1946, by Jacques Barge).
