= Brûlon =

- Commune
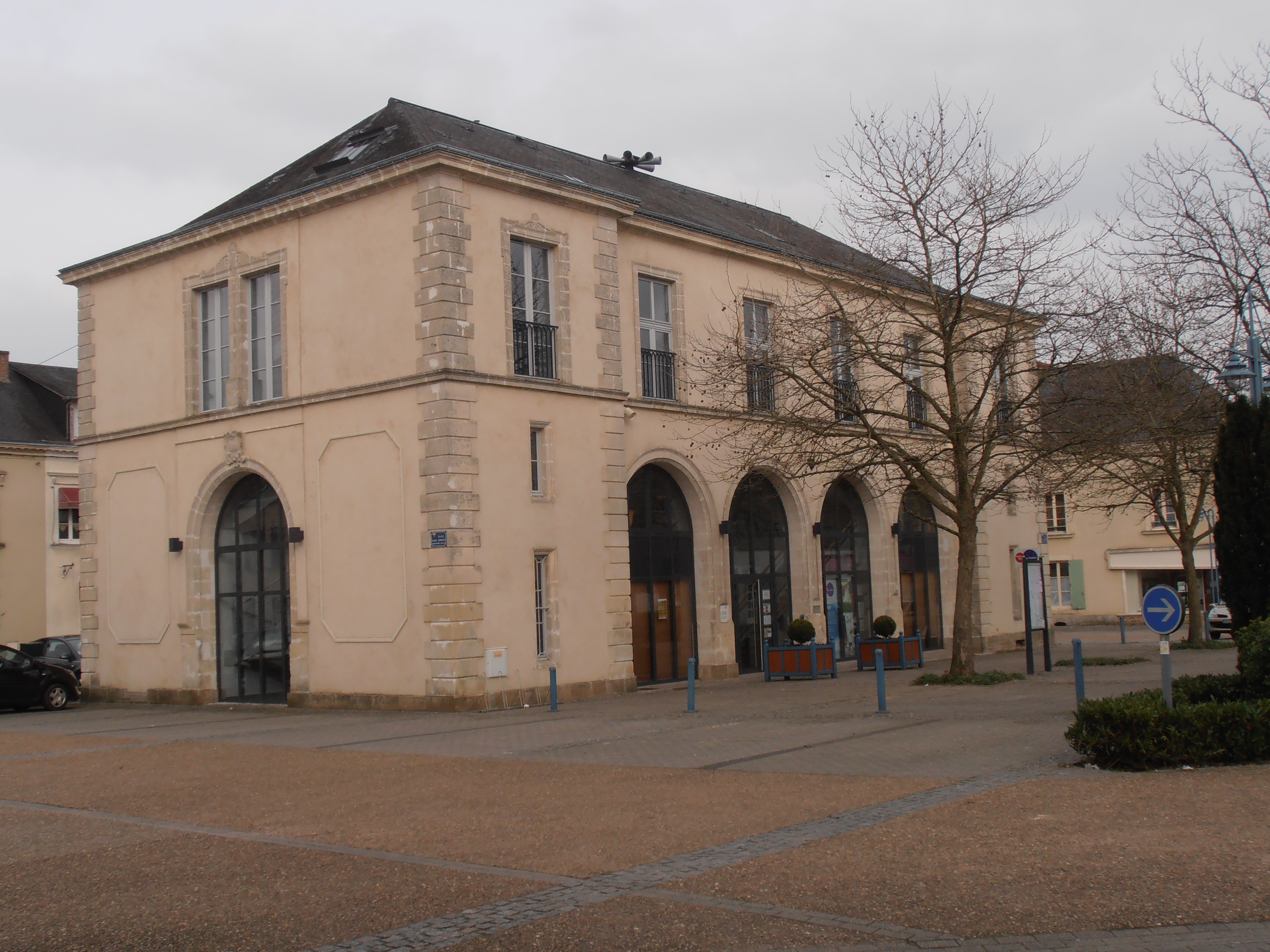
- The town hall in Brûlon

- Coat of arms
- Location of Brûlon
- Location within France Location within Pays de la Loire
- Coordinates: 47°58′02″N 0°14′01″W
- Country: France
- Region: Pays de la Loire
- Department: Sarthe
- Arrondissement: La Flèche
- Canton: Loué
- Intercommunality: Loué-Brûlon-Noyen

Government
  - Mayor (2020–2026): Daniel Coudreuse
- Area^{1}: 16.27 km^{2} (6.28 sq mi)
- Highest elevation: 128 m (420 ft)
- Lowest elevation: 47 m (154 ft)
- Population (2023): 1,549
  - Density: 95.21/km^{2} (246.6/sq mi)
- Demonym(s): Brûlonnais, Brûlonnaise
- Time zone: UTC+01:00 (CET)
  - Summer (DST): UTC+02:00 (CEST)
- INSEE/Postal code: 72050 /72350
- ^{1} French Land Register data, which excludes lakes, ponds, glaciers > 1 km^{2} (0.386 sq mi or 247 acres) and river estuaries.

Brûlon (French pronunciation: [bʁylɔ̃]) is a commune in the Sarthe department in the region of Pays de la Loire in north-western France.

== Geography ==
The river Vègre forms all of the commune's south-eastern border.

== See also ==
- Communes of the Sarthe department
