= Chemiré =

Chemiré may refer to several communes in France:

- Chemiré-en-Charnie, in the Sarthe department
- Chemiré-le-Gaudin, in the Sarthe department
- Chemiré-sur-Sarthe, in the Maine-et-Loire department
