= Fille =

Fille may refer to:

- Fillé, a commune in France

== See also ==
- File (disambiguation)
- Fili, historically a member of an elite class of poets in Ireland
- Filly, a young female horse
