= Pierre de la Forest =

French Catholic priest and cardinal

His Eminence Pierre de la Forest
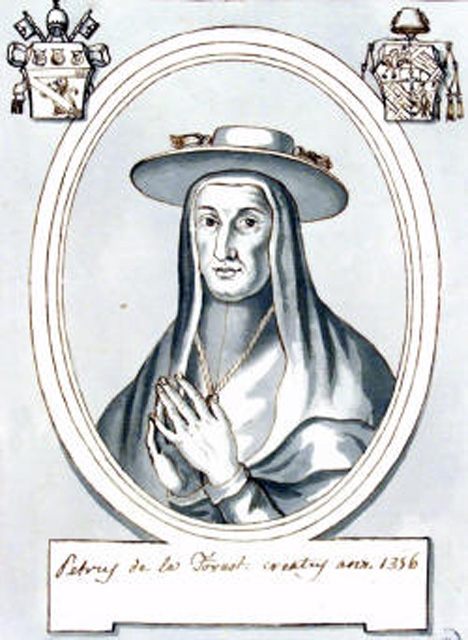
- Church: Catholic Church

Orders
- Ordination: before 1334
- Created cardinal: 23 December 1356 by Pope Innocent VI

Personal details
- Born: 1305 La Suze-sur-Sarthe
- Died: 27 June 1361 (aged 55–56) Avignon

Pierre de la Forest or Petrus Foresta, (1305–1361) was a French Bishop of Tournai, Bishop of Paris, Archbishop of Rouen and Cardinal of the Roman Catholic Church. He was also Chancellor of France.

== Biography ==
=== His family ===
Pierre de la Forest was born in 1305 in La Suze to Philip de la Forest and Marguerite de la Chapelle, sister of Geoffrey, Bishop of Le Mans. He had four brothers, and his cousin Jean was Abbot of La Couture in Le Mans.

=== His ecclesiastical career ===
De la Forest obtained a license in utroque (canon and civil law) and was then professor of law at the Universities of Orleans and Angers. In 1334, he became canon of Saint-Pierre de la Couture in Le Mans. Shortly afterwards, he obtained the archdeaconry of Montfort and the deanery of Ernée. He also became a lawyer in Parlement.

Whilst serving as Archdeacon of Montfort, de la Forest was elected bishop of Le Mans on the death of his uncle in 1347, Pope Clement VI did not recognize the election, and appointed in his place Jean de Craon, Archdeacon of Passais. He became Chancellor of the Duke of Normandy in October of that year. In July 1349, he was appointed Chancellor of France.

At about the same time, de la Forest was appointed Bishop of Tournai. In 1350, he was made executor of the King of France's will. In December of that year, he was transferred to the Bishopric of Paris. In September 1351, he was sent to attempt to conclude a peace treaty with the English. In February 1352, he was again transferred, this time to the Archbishopric of Rouen. He acquired La Loupelande in Maine and was ennobled for his service in 1354.

Pierre de la Forest was sent on two notable diplomatic missions during his career: to Avignon (1354) and to Bordeaux (1356). During the riots led by Éttienne Marcel in 1358, he sought to preemptively fire Marcel, as well as Simon de Buci who was the ambassador to the English, but the regent Charles did not take his advice.

Pope Innocent VI invested Pierre de la Forest as cardinal during the consistory of 23 December 1356. He entered the Papal curio in Avignon in 1357. Innocent VI then appointed him Papal Legate to Sicily and then to France

He wrote his will on 22 June 1361 and died of the Plague in Villeneuve-lès-Avignon on 27 June 1361. His heart was buried there, while his body was buried in the choir of Le Mans Cathedral near the tomb of his uncle. A statue of Pierre de la Forest was also placed in the choir.
