= Roëzé-sur-Sarthe =

- Commune
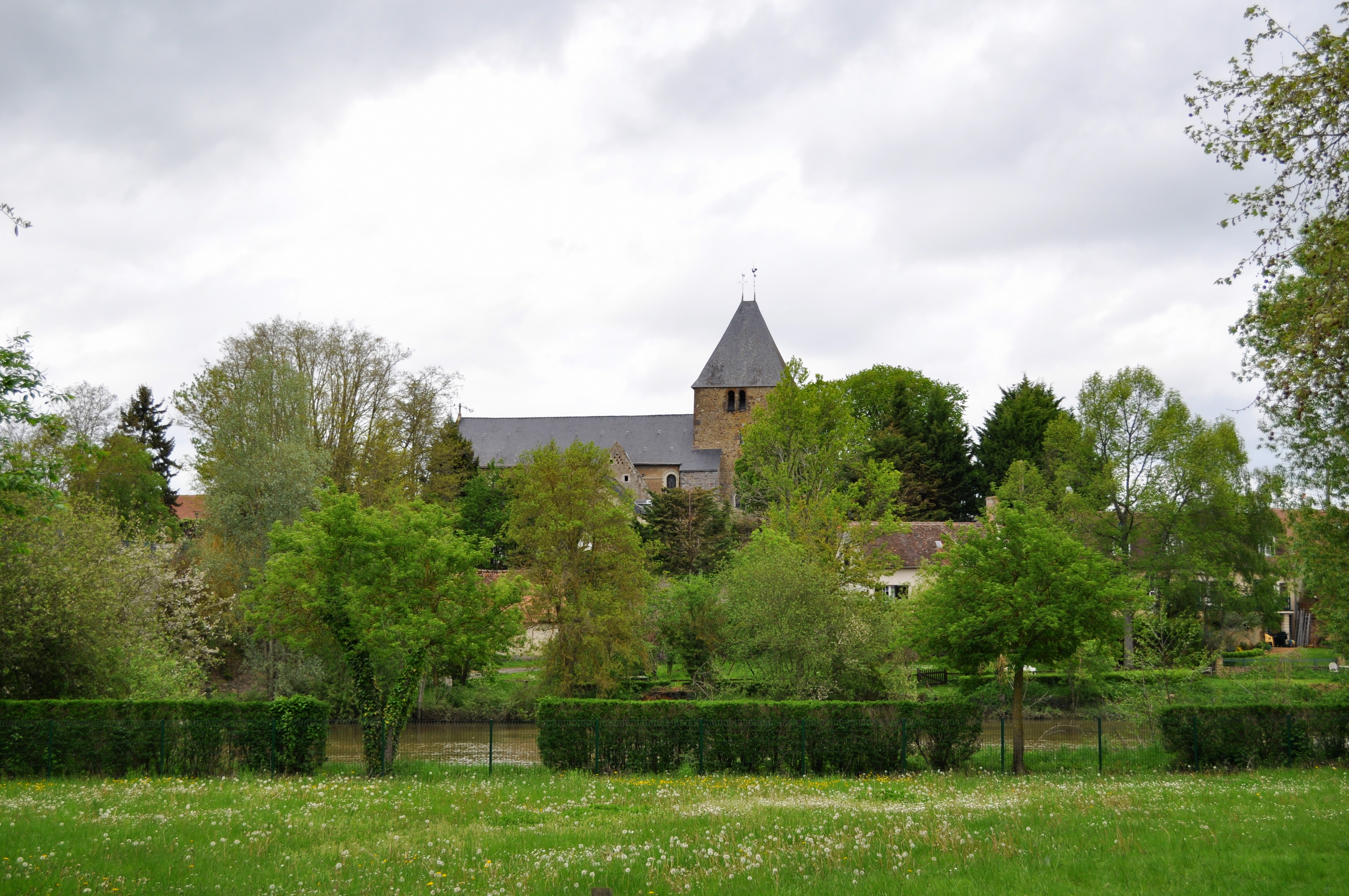
- A general view of Roëzé-sur-Sarthe
- Location of Roëzé-sur-Sarthe
- Location within France Location within Pays de la Loire
- Coordinates: 47°53′41″N 0°04′04″E
- Country: France
- Region: Pays de la Loire
- Department: Sarthe
- Arrondissement: La Flèche
- Canton: La Suze-sur-Sarthe
- Intercommunality: CC du Val de Sarthe

Government
  - Mayor (2020–2026): Catherine Taureau
- Area^{1}: 26.46 km^{2} (10.22 sq mi)
- Population (2023): 2,514
  - Density: 95.01/km^{2} (246.1/sq mi)
- Demonym(s): Roizéen, Roizéenne
- Time zone: UTC+01:00 (CET)
  - Summer (DST): UTC+02:00 (CEST)
- INSEE/Postal code: 72253 /72210
- ^{1} French Land Register data, which excludes lakes, ponds, glaciers > 1 km^{2} (0.386 sq mi or 247 acres) and river estuaries.

Roëzé-sur-Sarthe (French pronunciation: [ʁwaze syʁ saʁt], literally Roëzé on Sarthe; before 2022: Roézé-sur-Sarthe) is a commune in the Sarthe department in the region of Pays de la Loire in north-western France.

== Population ==
Historical population
Year	Pop.	±% p.a.
1968	1,252	—
1975	1,616	+3.71%
1982	1,866	+2.08%
1990	1,903	+0.25%
1999	2,327	+2.26%
2007	2,616	+1.47%
2012	2,774	+1.18%
2017	2,626	−1.09%
2023	2,514	−0.72%
Source: INSEE

== See also ==
- Communes of the Sarthe department
