= Matthieu Cointerel =

French Roman Catholic cardinal

His Eminence Matthieu Cointerel
- Cardinal-Priest of Santo Stefano al Monte Celio
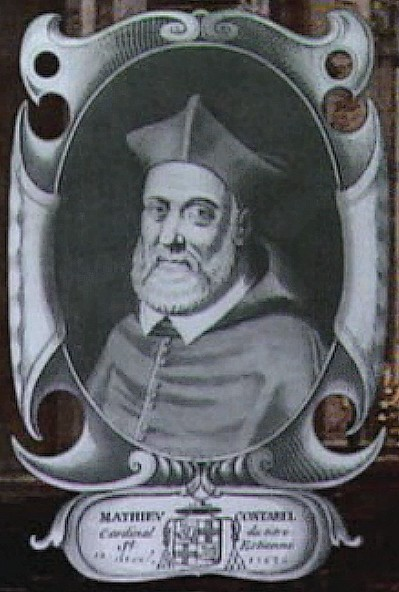
- Installed: 9 January 1584
- Term ended: 29 December 1585

Personal details
- Born: 1519 Morannes, France
- Died: 29 December 1585 Rome, Italy
- Denomination: Roman Catholic

Matthieu Cointerel (Morannes 1519 – 29 November 1585) also known as Matteo Contarelli, was a French Roman Catholic cardinal.

== Biography ==
Matthieu Cointerel was born in Mérannes, Anjou in 1519, the son of Hilaire Contarelli, a blacksmith, and Guyone Viuan. He studied with a maternal uncle in Angers (his uncle was a canon of the cathedral chapter of Angers Cathedral) and later at the University of Angers.

During his time in Angers, he met a foreign prince who invited him to go to travel to Italy with him. In Venice, he fell ill. Through his doctor, he met his doctor's brother, Ugo Boncompagni, a professor of law at the University of Bologna who later became Pope Gregory XIII. Through Ugo Boncompagni, Cointerel gained a position in the household of Boncompagni's colleague Andrea de Boni. Shortly after Cointerel entered Boni's household, Boni was called to Rome by Pope Paul III and Cointerel moved to Rome with him. At that time, Boni became a Referendary of the Apostolic Signatura. Boni was also a participant in the Council of Trent and Cointerel accompanied him there. Cointerel later became a datary of Cardinal Ippolito II d'Este in the Kingdom of France, and later to Cardinal Michele Bonelli in Spain, the Kingdom of Portugal, and the Kingdom of France. Then, the pope appointed him to the Apostolic Camera, a post that he resigned sometime before 1 June 1573. On 1 June 1573, Pope Gregory XIII named Cointerel his datary, and then on 1 June 1573 made him a canon of St. Peter's Basilica.

As a priest, Cointerel was incardinated in the see of Le Mans.

Pope Gregory XIII made him a cardinal priest in the consistory of 12 December 1583. He received the red hat and the titular church of Santo Stefano al Monte Celio of 9 January 1584. The pope also named him Prefect of the Secretariat of Apostolic Briefs. He later participated in the papal conclave of 1585 that elected Pope Sixtus V.

He died in Rome on 29 November 1585. He was buried in San Luigi dei Francesi.
