= Change file =

Change file may refer to:

- CWEB change file, a file documenting changes that is automatically merged during compilation/printing
- patch file, a file containing source code changes that can be patched into source files
- File change log, a file containing a log tracking changes to a file system
- Changelog file, a file containing a change log, a log of significant changes to a project

== See also ==
- Log file, a file logging activity
- Change (disambiguation)
- File (disambiguation)
