= Fercé-sur-Sarthe =

- Commune
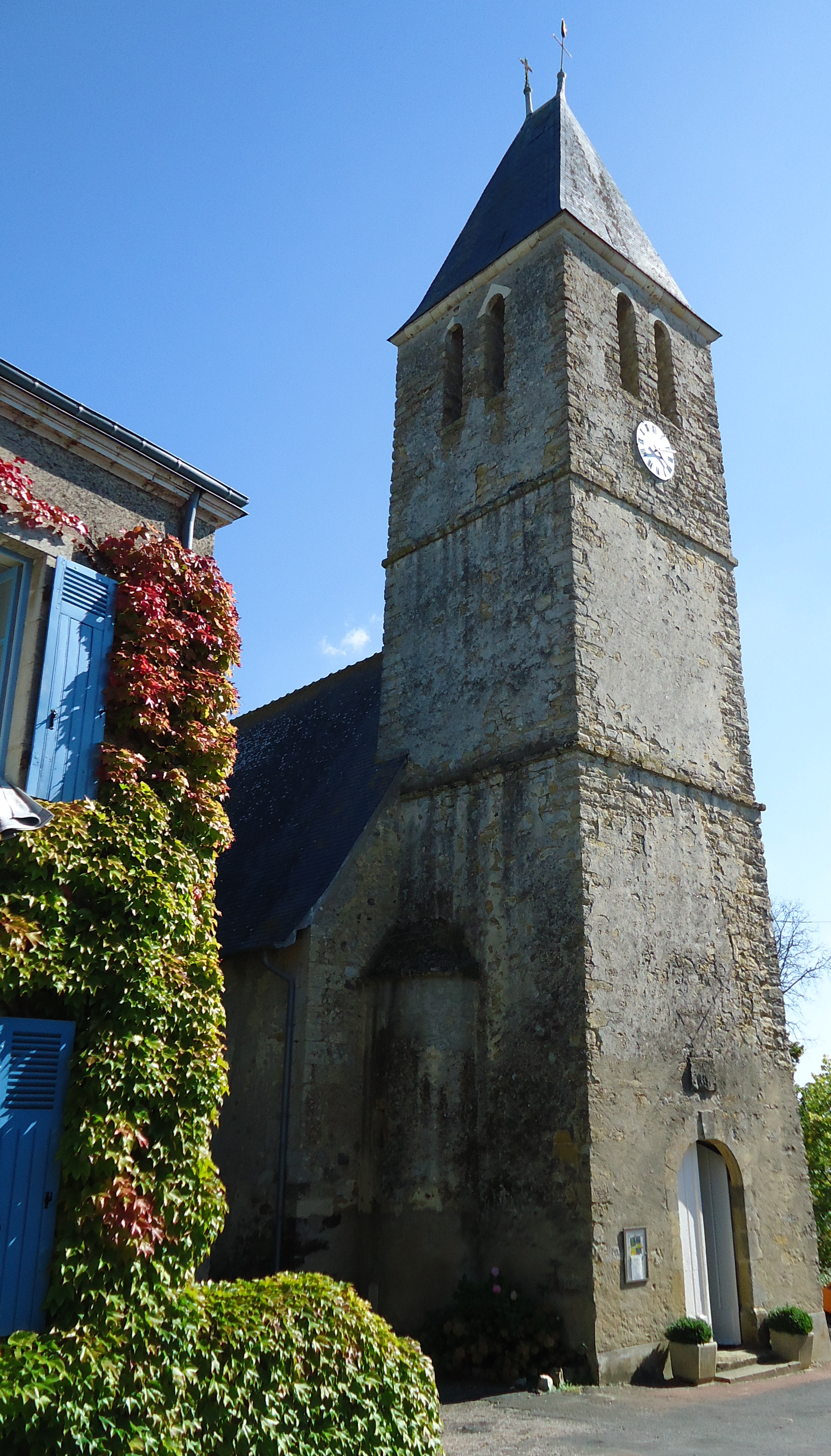
- Bell tower of the church of Saint Pierre
- Location of Fercé-sur-Sarthe
- Location within France Location within Pays de la Loire
- Coordinates: 47°54′08″N 0°01′59″E
- Country: France
- Region: Pays de la Loire
- Department: Sarthe
- Arrondissement: La Flèche
- Canton: La Suze-sur-Sarthe
- Intercommunality: Val de Sarthe

Government
  - Mayor (2020–2026): Dominique Dhumeaux
- Area^{1}: 12.2 km^{2} (4.7 sq mi)
- Population (2023): 575
  - Density: 47.1/km^{2} (122/sq mi)
- Demonym(s): Fercéin, Fercéine
- Time zone: UTC+01:00 (CET)
  - Summer (DST): UTC+02:00 (CEST)
- INSEE/Postal code: 72131 /72430
- ^{1} French Land Register data, which excludes lakes, ponds, glaciers > 1 km^{2} (0.386 sq mi or 247 acres) and river estuaries.

Fercé-sur-Sarthe (French pronunciation: [fɛʁse syʁ saʁt], literally Fercé on Sarthe) is a commune in the Sarthe department in the Pays de la Loire region in north-western France.

== See also ==
- Communes of the Sarthe department
