= The X-Files (disambiguation) =

The X-Files is an American sci-fi/drama television series that aired from 1993 until 2002.

X-Files may also refer to:

== The X-Files franchise ==
- The X-Files (comics), original tie-in comics from the 1990s
- The X-Files (composition), the instrumental by Mark Snow used in the series
- The X-Files (film), Fight the Future, a 1998 film based on the series
- The X-Files (franchise), a franchise based upon the series
- The X-Files: The Album, 1998 soundtrack album for the 1998 film
- The X-Files: Original Motion Picture Score, 1998 film score album for the 1998 film
- The X-Files Collectible Card Game, a collectible card game by US Playing Card Company
- The X-Files Game, a 1998 video game
- The X-Files (film), I Want to Believe, a 2008 film based on the series
- X-files unit, a fictional case that has been deemed unsolvable by the FBI, as referred to in the series

== Other topics ==
- Twitter Files, or, X Files, where the social media network called "X" was formerly named "Twitter"; a documents release
- an ".x" file, a file in the .x file format

== See also ==
- Ancient X-Files, a TV show on National Geographic Channel
- X-Phile, a fan of X-Files
- .x, a 3-D file format
- File (disambiguation)
- X (disambiguation)
