= Mézeray =

Mézeray may refer to:

- François-Eudes de Mézeray (1610-1683), French historian
- Mézeray, Sarthe, a commune of the Sarthe département in France

== See also ==
- Mazeray, a commune in the Charente-Maritime department in southwestern France
