= Charles de Villaines =

French nobleman

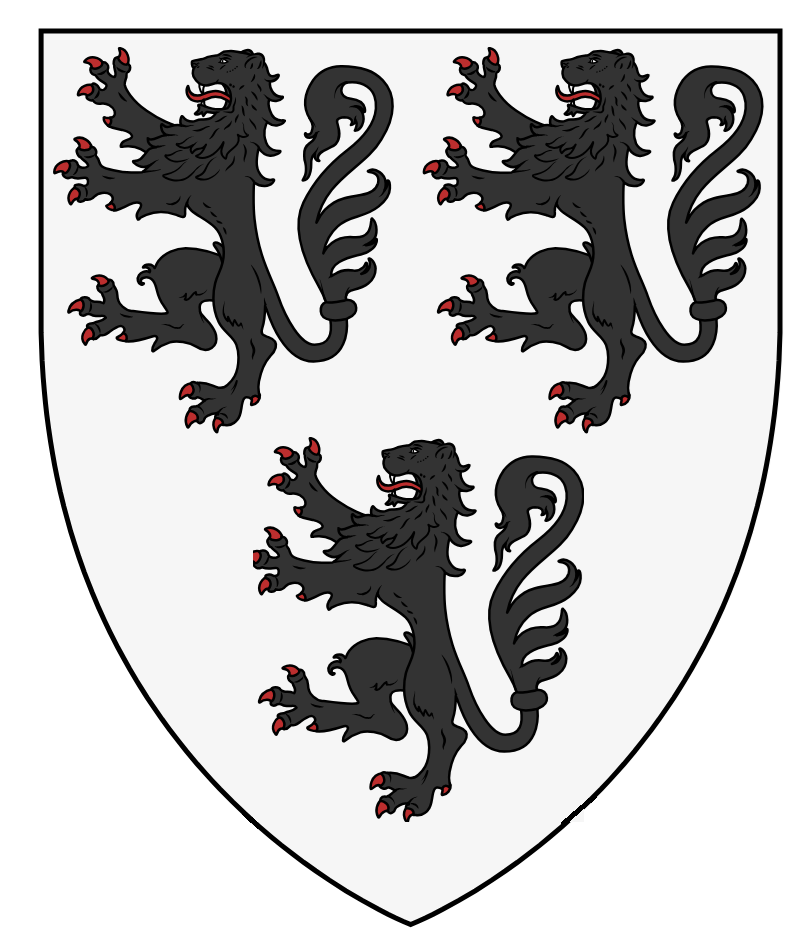
Charles de Villaines' Arms

Charles de Villaines (c. 1394 – 25 October 1415) was a French nobleman, chambellan du Roi, and seigneur of Fontenay and Malicorne. A prominent member of the noble House of Villaines, he was the son of Pierre IV de Villaines, governor de La Rochelle, and a descendant of Pierre le Bègue de Villaines. Charles was married to Catherine d'Amboise, daughter of Hugues II d'Amboise-Chaumont, and together they had two children, Philippine de Villaines and Louis de Villaines. He bore the coat of arms d'argent à trois lions de sable, armés et lampassés de gueules. Charles participated in military campaigns under the Count of Vendôme. He died on 25 October 1415 at the Battle of Agincourt.
