= Voivres-lès-le-Mans =

- Commune
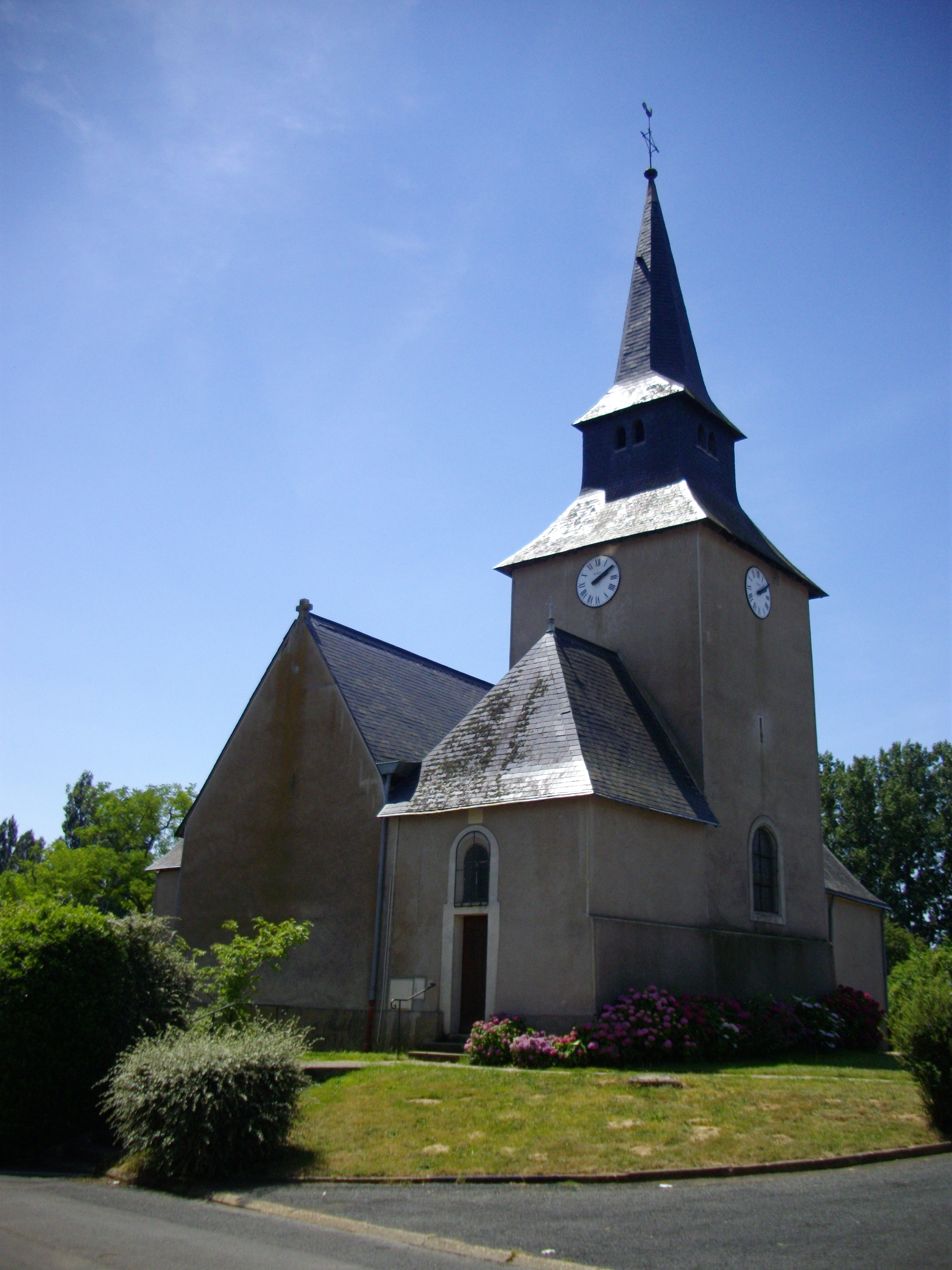
- The church of Saint-Étienne

- Coat of arms
- Location of Voivres-lès-le-Mans
- Location within France Location within Pays de la Loire
- Coordinates: 47°55′44″N 0°04′19″E
- Country: France
- Region: Pays de la Loire
- Department: Sarthe
- Arrondissement: La Flèche
- Canton: La Suze-sur-Sarthe
- Intercommunality: Val de Sarthe

Government
  - Mayor (2020–2026): Martine Couet
- Area^{1}: 11.44 km^{2} (4.42 sq mi)
- Population (2023): 1,345
  - Density: 117.6/km^{2} (304.5/sq mi)
- Demonym(s): Voivrais, Voivraise
- Time zone: UTC+01:00 (CET)
  - Summer (DST): UTC+02:00 (CEST)
- INSEE/Postal code: 72381 /72210
- ^{1} French Land Register data, which excludes lakes, ponds, glaciers > 1 km^{2} (0.386 sq mi or 247 acres) and river estuaries.

Voivres-lès-le-Mans (French pronunciation: [vwavʁ lɛ lə mɑ̃], literally Voivres near Le Mans) is a commune in the Sarthe department in the region of Pays de la Loire in north-western France.

== See also ==
- Communes of the Sarthe department
