= La Suze-sur-Sarthe =

- Commune
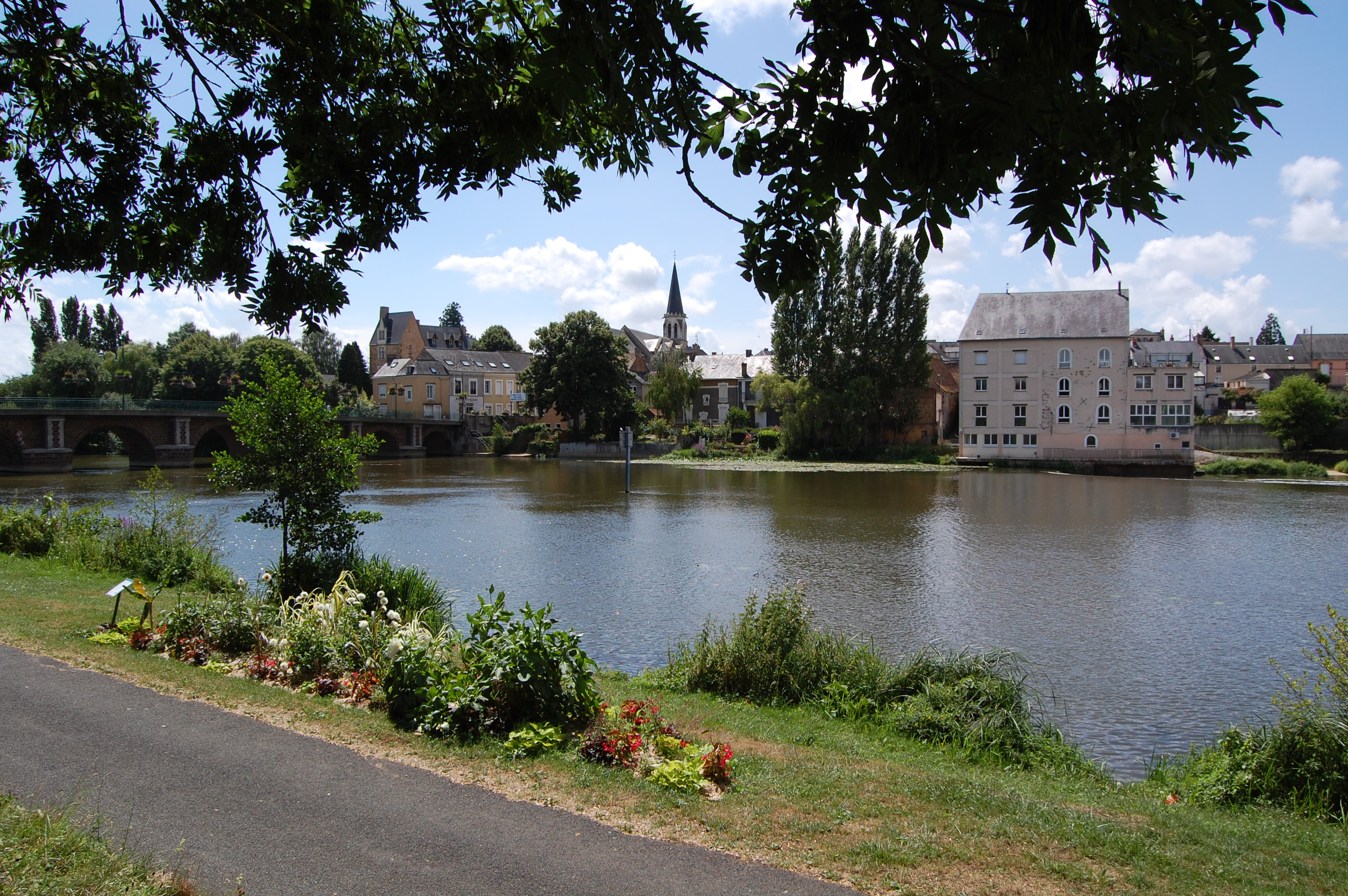
- La Suze seen from the towpath

- Coat of arms
- Location of La Suze-sur-Sarthe
- Location within France Location within Pays de la Loire
- Coordinates: 47°53′26″N 0°01′34″E
- Country: France
- Region: Pays de la Loire
- Department: Sarthe
- Arrondissement: La Flèche
- Canton: La Suze-sur-Sarthe
- Intercommunality: CC du Val de Sarthe

Government
  - Mayor (2020–2026): Emmanuel d'Aillières
- Area^{1}: 21.40 km^{2} (8.26 sq mi)
- Highest elevation: 76 m (249 ft)
- Lowest elevation: 32 m (105 ft)
- Population (2023): 4,693
  - Density: 219.3/km^{2} (568.0/sq mi)
- Demonym(s): Suzerain, Suzeraine
- Time zone: UTC+01:00 (CET)
  - Summer (DST): UTC+02:00 (CEST)
- INSEE/Postal code: 72346 /72210
- ^{1} French Land Register data, which excludes lakes, ponds, glaciers > 1 km^{2} (0.386 sq mi or 247 acres) and river estuaries.

La Suze-sur-Sarthe (French pronunciation: [la syz syʁ saʁt], lit. 'La Suze on Sarthe') is a commune in the Sarthe department in the region of Pays de la Loire in north-western France.

== Population ==
Historical population
Year	Pop.	±% p.a.
1968	2,807	—
1975	3,602	+3.63%
1982	3,685	+0.33%
1990	3,614	−0.24%
1999	3,597	−0.05%
2007	3,999	+1.33%
2012	4,379	+1.83%
2017	4,463	+0.38%
2023	4,693	+0.84%
Source: INSEE

== See also ==
- Communes of the Sarthe department
