= Canton of La Suze-sur-Sarthe =

Coordinates: 47.89°N 0.02°E

The canton of La Suze-sur-Sarthe is an administrative division of the Sarthe department, northwestern France. Its borders were modified at the French canton reorganisation which came into effect in March 2015. Its seat is in La Suze-sur-Sarthe.

It consists of the following communes:

1. Chemiré-le-Gaudin
2. Étival-lès-le-Mans
3. Fercé-sur-Sarthe
4. Fillé
5. Guécélard
6. Louplande
7. Malicorne-sur-Sarthe
8. Mézeray
9. Parigné-le-Pôlin
10. Roëzé-sur-Sarthe
11. Saint-Jean-du-Bois
12. Souligné-Flacé
13. Spay
14. La Suze-sur-Sarthe
15. Voivres-lès-le-Mans
