= Malicorne-sur-Sarthe =

- Commune
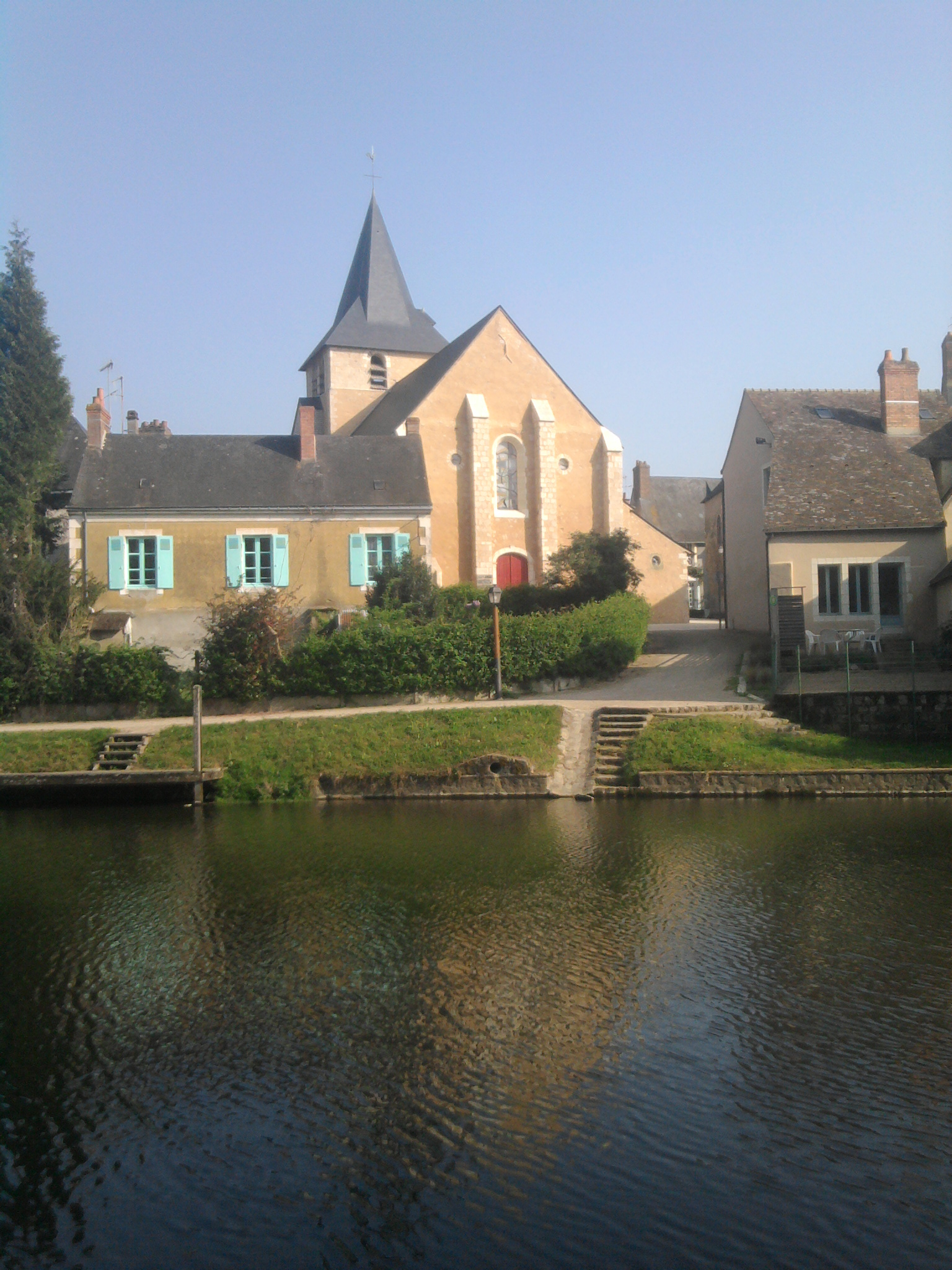
- St Silvester's church
- Location of Malicorne-sur-Sarthe
- Location within France Location within Pays de la Loire
- Coordinates: 47°48′52″N 0°05′01″W
- Country: France
- Region: Pays de la Loire
- Department: Sarthe
- Arrondissement: La Flèche
- Canton: La Suze-sur-Sarthe
- Intercommunality: CC du Val de Sarthe

Government
  - Mayor (2020–2026): Carole Roger
- Area^{1}: 15.13 km^{2} (5.84 sq mi)
- Highest elevation: 70 m (230 ft)
- Lowest elevation: 28 m (92 ft)
- Population (2023): 1,854
  - Density: 122.5/km^{2} (317.4/sq mi)
- Demonym(s): Malicornais, Malicornaise
- Time zone: UTC+01:00 (CET)
  - Summer (DST): UTC+02:00 (CEST)
- INSEE/Postal code: 72179 /72270
- ^{1} French Land Register data, which excludes lakes, ponds, glaciers > 1 km^{2} (0.386 sq mi or 247 acres) and river estuaries.

Malicorne-sur-Sarthe (French pronunciation: [malikɔʁn syʁ saʁt], literally Malicorne on Sarthe) is a commune in the Sarthe department in the region of Pays de la Loire in north-western France.

== See also ==
- Communes of the Sarthe department
- Malicorne (band), a musical group named after the commune
