= Morannes sur Sarthe-Daumeray =

- Commune
- Location of Morannes sur Sarthe-Daumeray
- Location within France Location within Pays de la Loire
- Coordinates: 47°44′46″N 0°24′58″W
- Country: France
- Region: Pays de la Loire
- Department: Maine-et-Loire
- Arrondissement: Angers
- Canton: Tiercé
- Intercommunality: Anjou Loir et Sarthe

Government
  - Mayor (2020–2026): Jean-Marie Cardoen
- Area^{1}: 87.88 km^{2} (33.93 sq mi)
- Population (2023): 3,687
  - Density: 41.95/km^{2} (108.7/sq mi)
- Time zone: UTC+01:00 (CET)
  - Summer (DST): UTC+02:00 (CEST)
- INSEE/Postal code: 49220 /49640
- Website: morannessursarthe-daumeray.fr
- ^{1} French Land Register data, which excludes lakes, ponds, glaciers > 1 km^{2} (0.386 sq mi or 247 acres) and river estuaries.

Morannes sur Sarthe-Daumeray (French pronunciation: [mɔʁan syʁ saʁt domʁɛ]) is a commune in the department of Maine-et-Loire, western France. The municipality was established on 1 January 2017 by the merger of the former communes of Morannes-sur-Sarthe and Daumeray. Morannes-sur-Sarthe was the result of the merger on 1 January 2016 of the communes of Morannes and Chemiré-sur-Sarthe.

== Population ==
Population data refer to the area corresponding with the commune as of January 2025.

Historical population
Year	Pop.	±% p.a.
1968	3,040	—
1975	2,781	−1.26%
1982	2,935	+0.77%
1990	2,937	+0.01%
1999	3,155	+0.80%
2007	3,421	+1.02%
2012	3,562	+0.81%
2017	3,664	+0.57%
2023	3,687	+0.10%
Source: INSEE

== See also ==
- Communes of the Maine-et-Loire department
