= Daumeray =

Commune in Maine-et-Loire, France

- Part of Morannes sur Sarthe-Daumeray
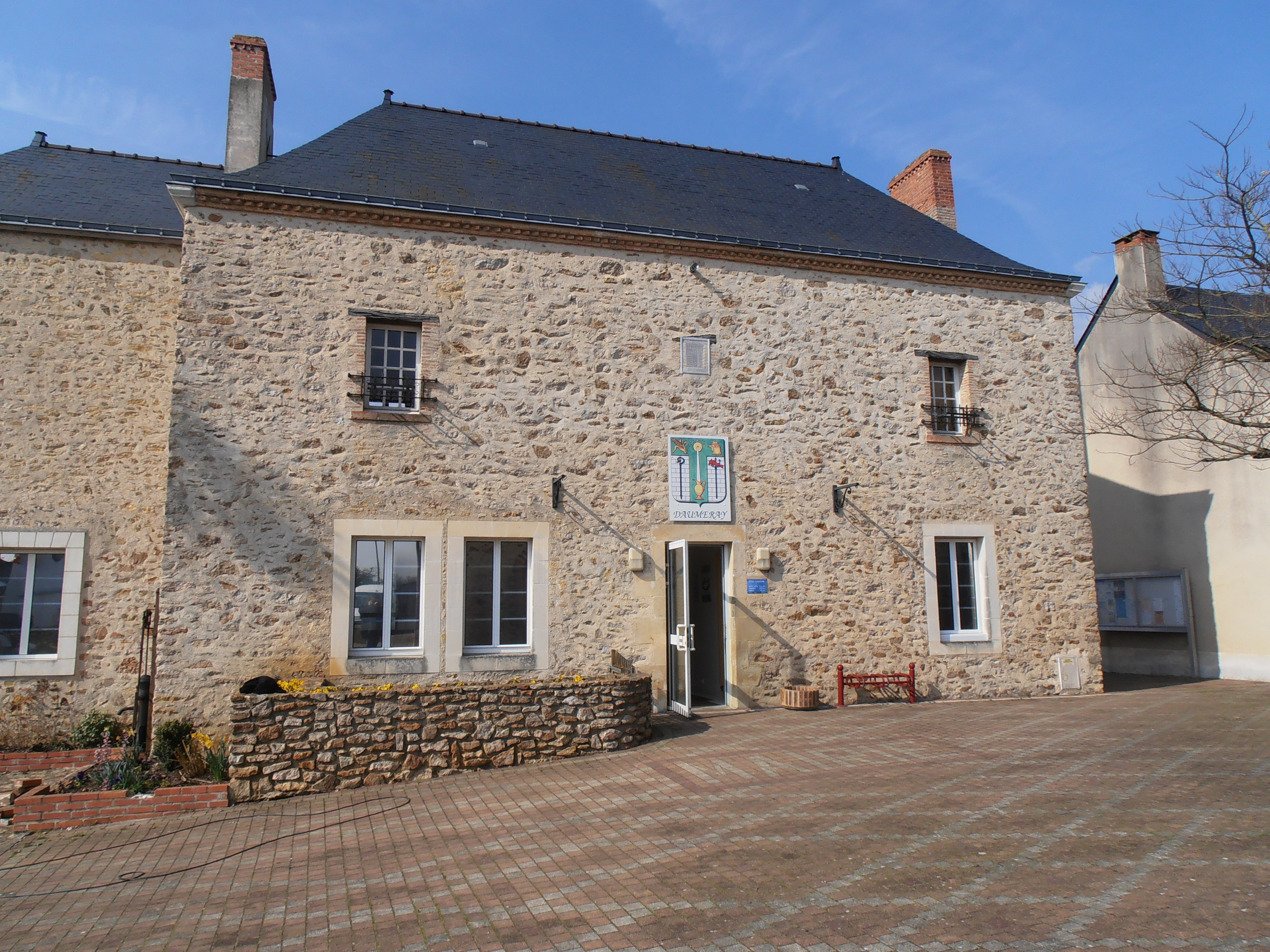
- Daumeray town hall

- Coat of arms
- Location of Daumeray
- Location within France Location within Pays de la Loire
- Coordinates: 47°42′10″N 0°21′34″W
- Country: France
- Region: Pays de la Loire
- Department: Maine-et-Loire
- Arrondissement: Angers
- Canton: Tiercé
- Commune: Morannes sur Sarthe-Daumeray
- Area^{1}: 40.53 km^{2} (15.65 sq mi)
- Elevation: 32 m (105 ft)
- Highest elevation: 67 m (220 ft)
- Lowest elevation: 17 m (56 ft)
- Population (2022): 1,512
  - Density: 37.31/km^{2} (96.62/sq mi)
- Demonym(s): Daumeréen, Daumeréenne
- Time zone: UTC+01:00 (CET)
  - Summer (DST): UTC+02:00 (CEST)
- Postal code: 49640
- ^{1} French Land Register data, which excludes lakes, ponds, glaciers > 1 km^{2} (0.386 sq mi or 247 acres) and river estuaries.

Daumeray (French pronunciation: [domʁɛ]) is a former commune in the Maine-et-Loire department in western France. On 1 January 2017, it was merged into the new commune Morannes sur Sarthe-Daumeray.

== See also ==
- Communes of the Maine-et-Loire department
