= Parigné-le-Pôlin =

- Commune
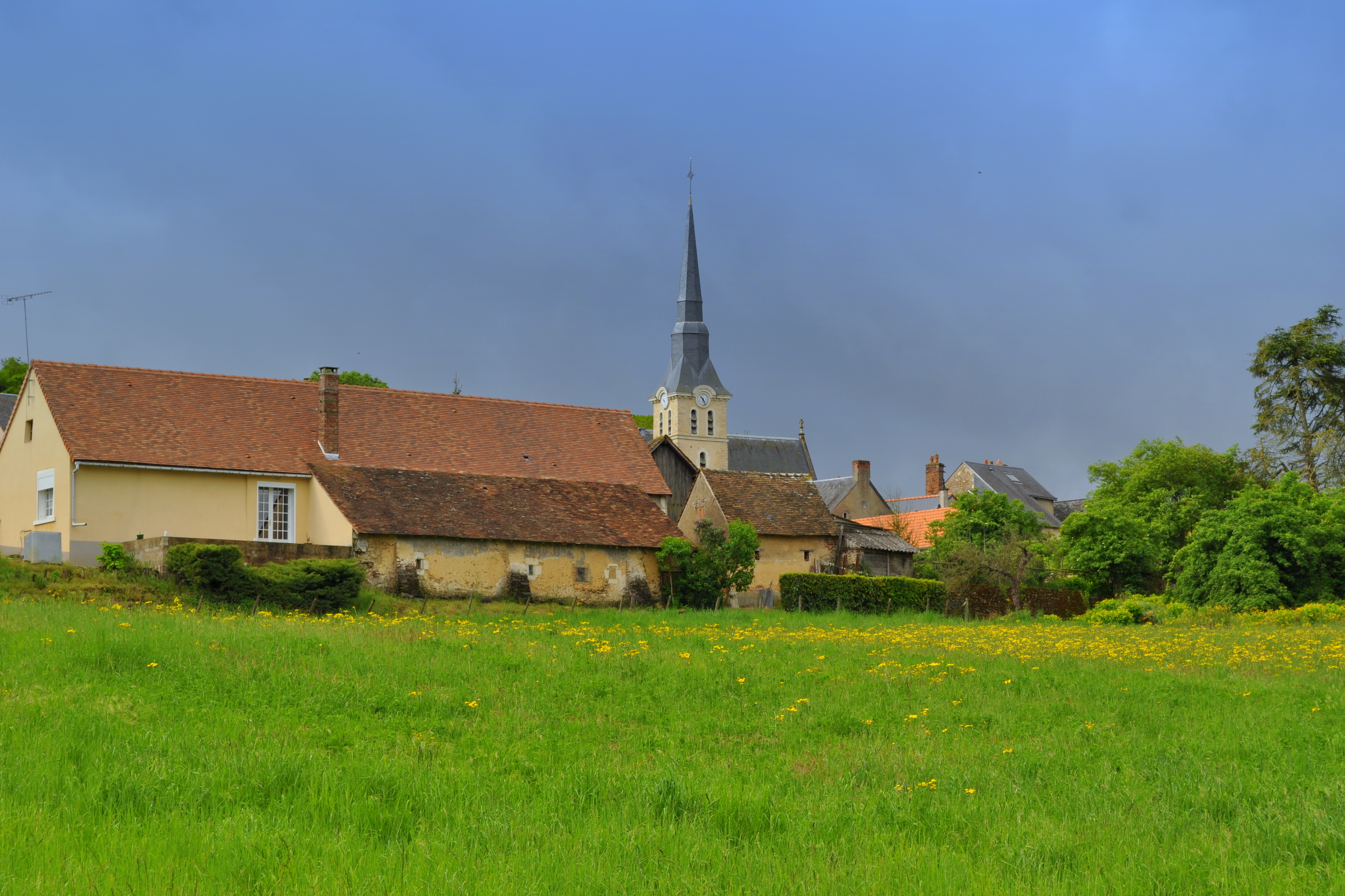
- A general view of Parigné-le-Pôlin
- Location of Parigné-le-Pôlin
- Location within France Location within Pays de la Loire
- Coordinates: 47°51′00″N 0°06′32″E
- Country: France
- Region: Pays de la Loire
- Department: Sarthe
- Arrondissement: La Flèche
- Canton: La Suze-sur-Sarthe
- Intercommunality: CC du Val de Sarthe

Government
  - Mayor (2020–2026): Joël Leproux
- Area^{1}: 13.85 km^{2} (5.35 sq mi)
- Highest elevation: 113 m (371 ft)
- Lowest elevation: 37 m (121 ft)
- Population (2023): 1,037
  - Density: 74.87/km^{2} (193.9/sq mi)
- Demonym(s): Parignéen, Parignéenne
- Time zone: UTC+01:00 (CET)
  - Summer (DST): UTC+02:00 (CEST)
- INSEE/Postal code: 72230 /72330
- ^{1} French Land Register data, which excludes lakes, ponds, glaciers > 1 km^{2} (0.386 sq mi or 247 acres) and river estuaries.

Parigné-le-Pôlin (French pronunciation: [paʁiɲe lə polɛ̃]) is a commune in the Sarthe department in the region of Pays de la Loire in north-western France.

== See also ==
- Communes of the Sarthe department
