= Guécélard =

- Commune
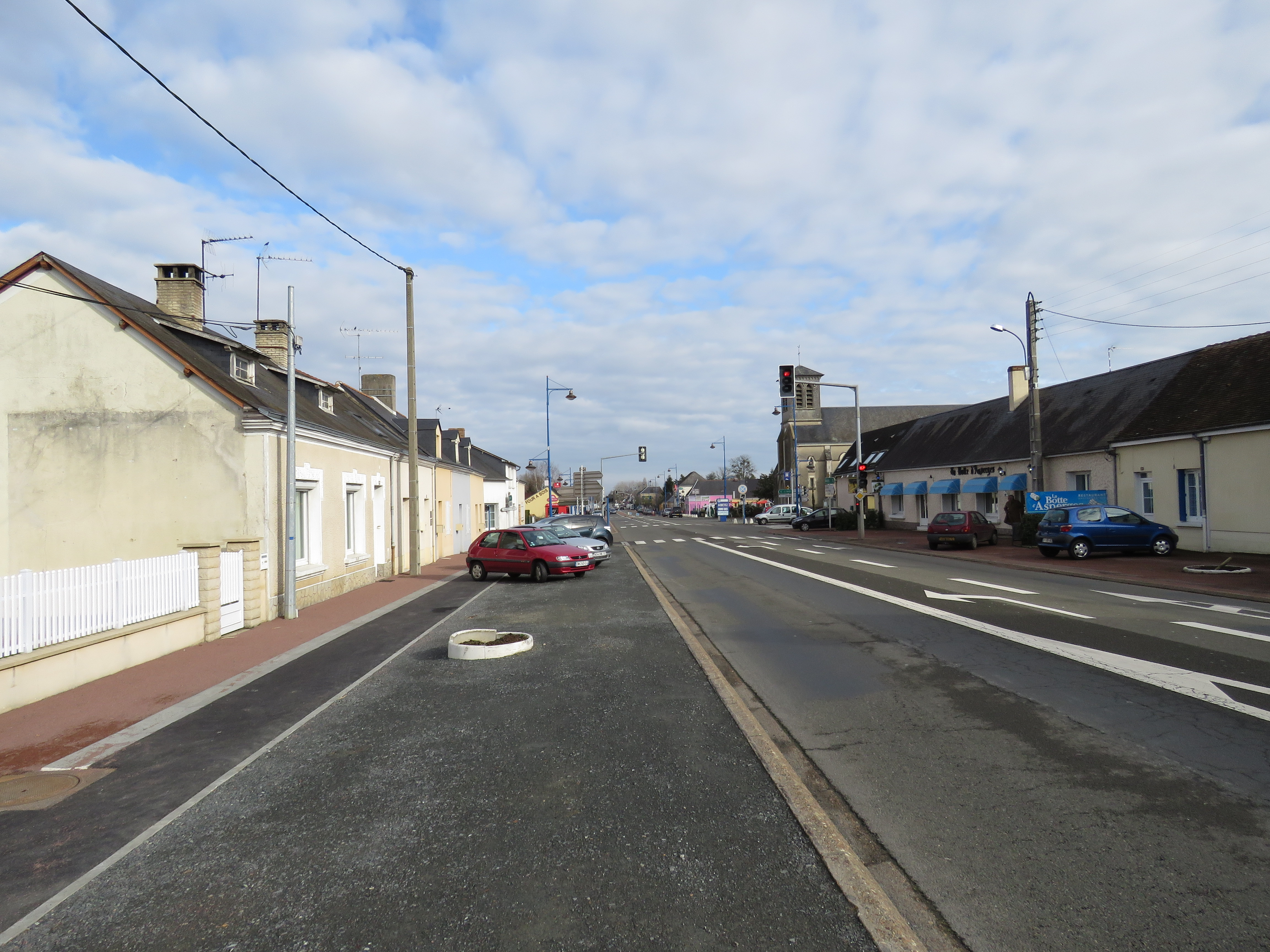
- The main road through Guécélard

- Coat of arms
- Location of Guécélard
- Location within France Location within Pays de la Loire
- Coordinates: 47°52′34″N 0°07′39″E
- Country: France
- Region: Pays de la Loire
- Department: Sarthe
- Arrondissement: La Flèche
- Canton: La Suze-sur-Sarthe
- Intercommunality: Val de Sarthe

Government
  - Mayor (2020–2026): Alain Viot
- Area^{1}: 12.2 km^{2} (4.7 sq mi)
- Population (2023): 3,202
  - Density: 262/km^{2} (680/sq mi)
- Demonym(s): Guécélardais, Guécélardaise
- Time zone: UTC+01:00 (CET)
  - Summer (DST): UTC+02:00 (CEST)
- INSEE/Postal code: 72146 /72230
- ^{1} French Land Register data, which excludes lakes, ponds, glaciers > 1 km^{2} (0.386 sq mi or 247 acres) and river estuaries.

Guécélard (French pronunciation: [ɡeselaʁ]) is a commune in the Sarthe department in the region of Pays de la Loire in north-western France.

== Population ==
Historical population
| Year | Pop. | ±% p.a. |
|---|---|---|
| 1968 | 660 | — |
| 1975 | 982 | +5.84% |
| 1982 | 1,663 | +7.82% |
| 1990 | 2,261 | +3.91% |
| 1999 | 2,594 | +1.54% |
| 2007 | 2,679 | +0.40% |
| 2012 | 2,844 | +1.20% |
| 2017 | 3,019 | +1.20% |
| 2023 | 3,202 | +0.99% |
Source: INSEE

== See also ==
- Communes of the Sarthe department
