= Spay, Sarthe =

Spay
- Commune
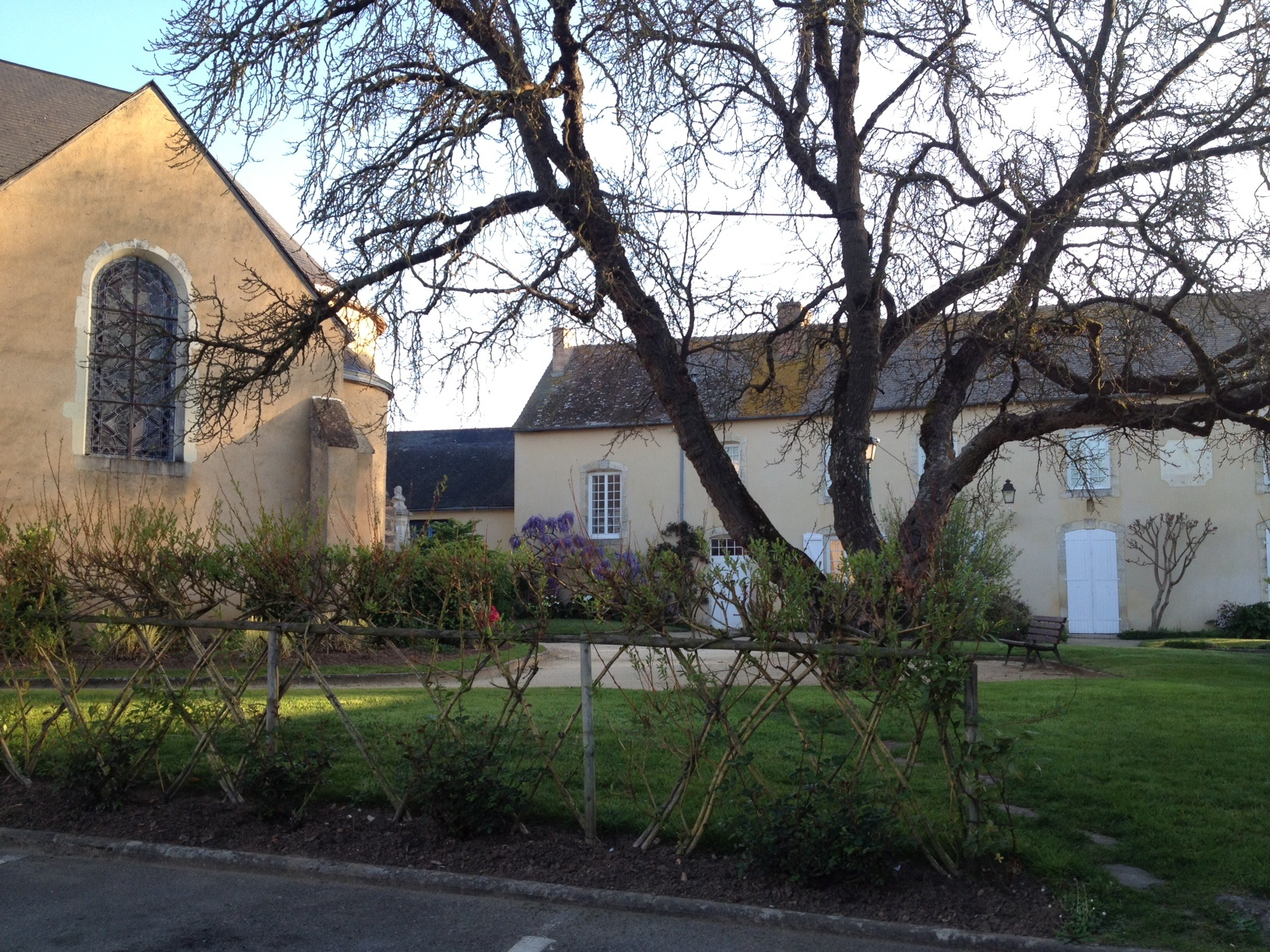
- The church and the presbytery

- Coat of arms
- Location of Spay
- Location within France Location within Pays de la Loire
- Coordinates: 47°55′24″N 0°09′03″E
- Country: France
- Region: Pays de la Loire
- Department: Sarthe
- Arrondissement: La Flèche
- Canton: La Suze-sur-Sarthe

Government
  - Mayor (2020–2026): Jean-Yves Avignon
- Area^{1}: 14.22 km^{2} (5.49 sq mi)
- Highest elevation: 58 m (190 ft)
- Lowest elevation: 37 m (121 ft)
- Population (2023): 2,808
  - Density: 197.5/km^{2} (511.4/sq mi)
- Demonym(s): Spayen, Spayenne
- Time zone: UTC+01:00 (CET)
  - Summer (DST): UTC+02:00 (CEST)
- INSEE/Postal code: 72344 /72700
- ^{1} French Land Register data, which excludes lakes, ponds, glaciers > 1 km^{2} (0.386 sq mi or 247 acres) and river estuaries.

Spay (French pronunciation: [spɛ]) is a commune in the Sarthe department in the region of Pays de la Loire in north-western France.

== Population ==
Historical population
Year	Pop.	±% p.a.
1968	814	—
1975	1,176	+5.40%
1982	1,848	+6.67%
1990	2,314	+2.85%
1999	2,300	−0.07%
2007	2,602	+1.55%
2012	2,890	+2.12%
2017	2,890	+0.00%
2023	2,808	−0.48%
Source: INSEE

== See also ==
- Communes of the Sarthe department
