= Saint-Jean-du-Bois =

- Commune
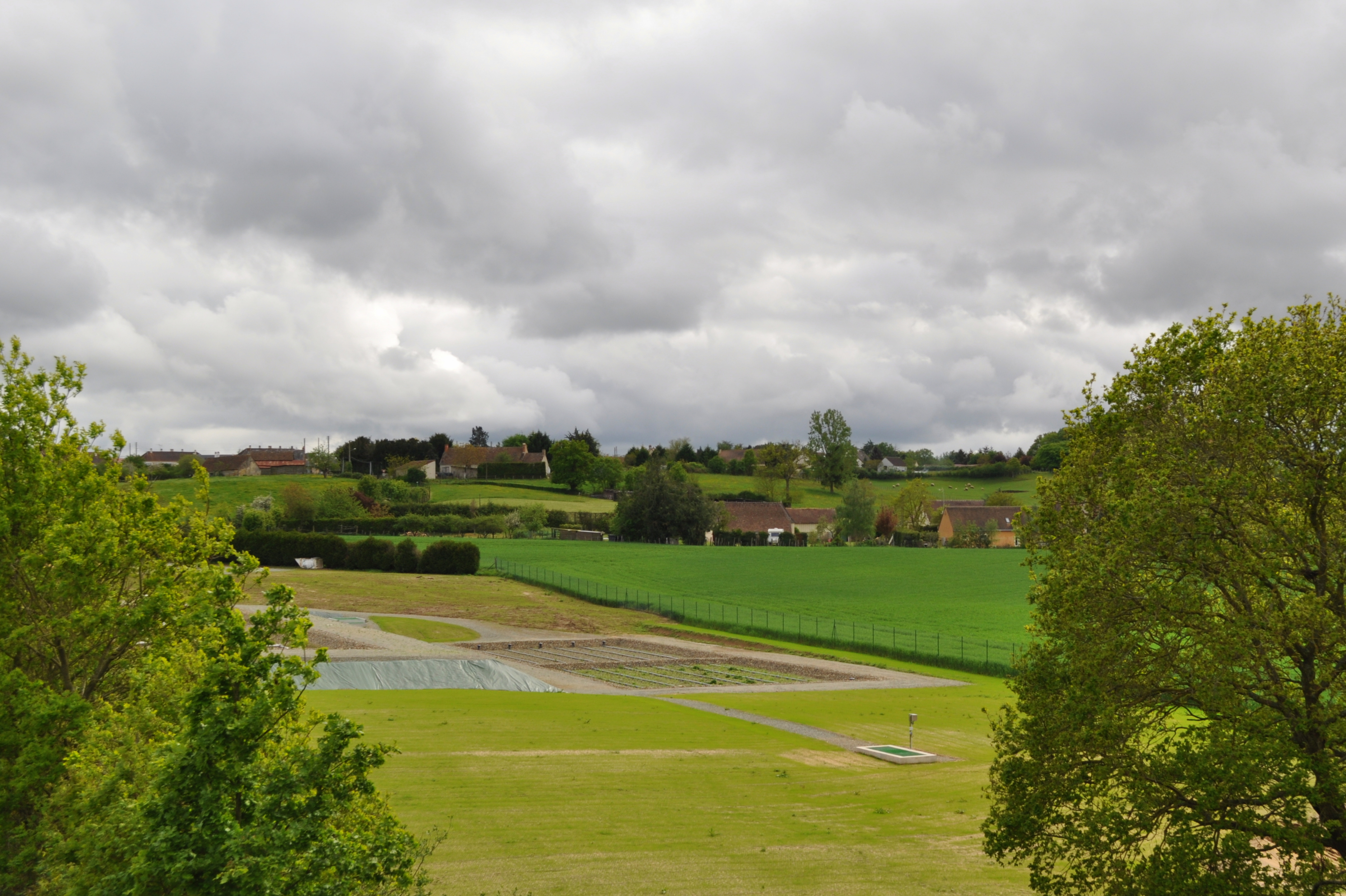
- A general view of Saint-Jean-du-Bois
- Location of Saint-Jean-du-Bois
- Location within France Location within Pays de la Loire
- Coordinates: 47°52′12″N 0°02′21″W
- Country: France
- Region: Pays de la Loire
- Department: Sarthe
- Arrondissement: La Flèche
- Canton: La Suze-sur-Sarthe
- Intercommunality: Val de Sarthe

Government
  - Mayor (2020–2026): Jean-Paul Boisard
- Area^{1}: 14.62 km^{2} (5.64 sq mi)
- Highest elevation: 73 m (240 ft)
- Lowest elevation: 34 m (112 ft)
- Population (2023): 616
  - Density: 42.1/km^{2} (109/sq mi)
- Demonym(s): Jamboisien, Jamboisienne
- Time zone: UTC+01:00 (CET)
  - Summer (DST): UTC+02:00 (CEST)
- INSEE/Postal code: 72293 /72430
- ^{1} French Land Register data, which excludes lakes, ponds, glaciers > 1 km^{2} (0.386 sq mi or 247 acres) and river estuaries.

Saint-Jean-du-Bois (French pronunciation: [sɛ̃ ʒɑ̃ dy bwa]) is a commune in the Sarthe department in the region of Pays de la Loire in north-western France.

== See also ==
- Communes of the Sarthe department
