= Louplande =

- Commune
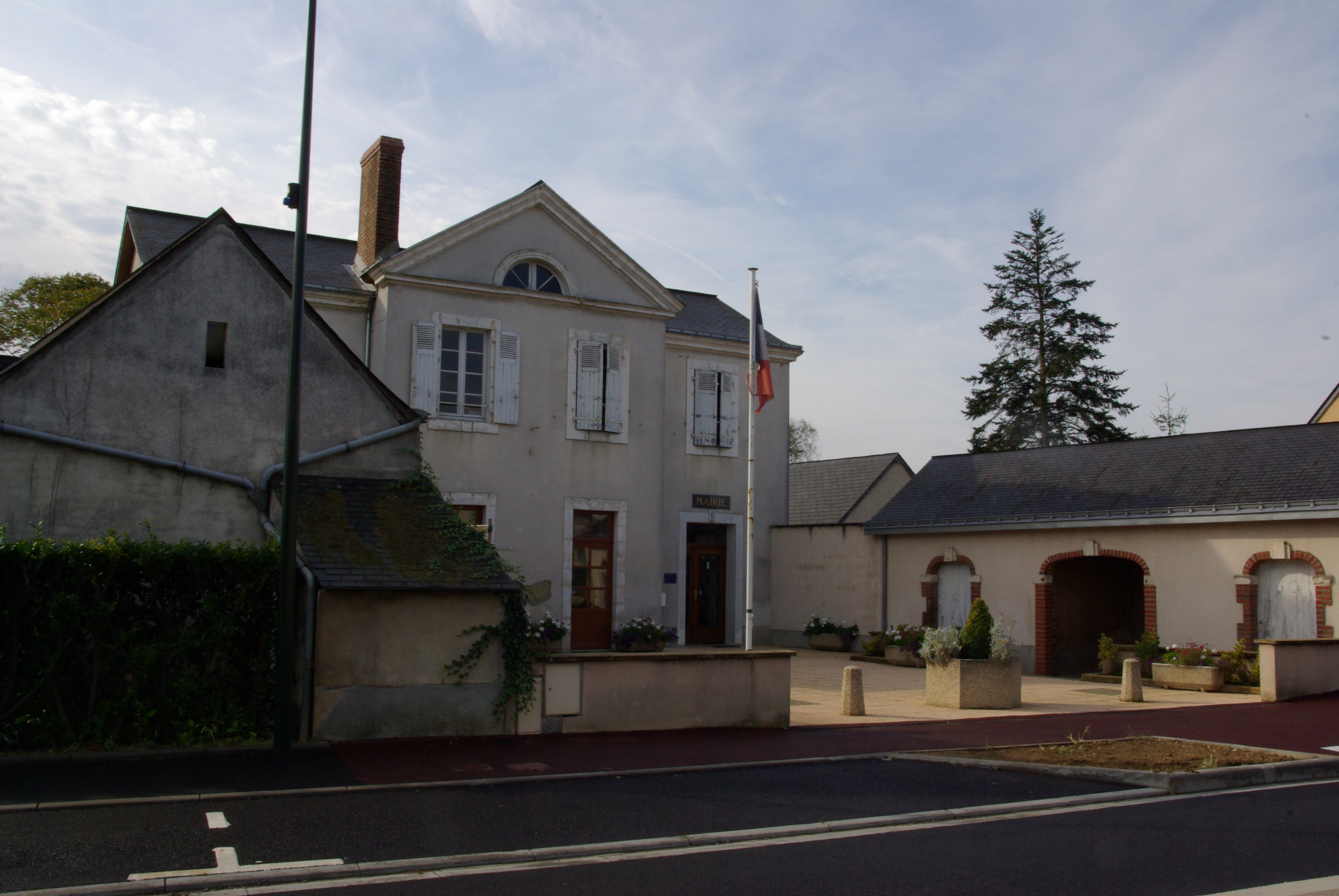
- The town hall of Louplande
- Location of Louplande
- Location within France Location within Pays de la Loire
- Coordinates: 47°56′41″N 0°02′32″E
- Country: France
- Region: Pays de la Loire
- Department: Sarthe
- Arrondissement: La Flèche
- Canton: La Suze-sur-Sarthe
- Intercommunality: Val de Sarthe

Government
  - Mayor (2020–2026): Noël Tellier
- Area^{1}: 18.43 km^{2} (7.12 sq mi)
- Population (2023): 1,505
  - Density: 81.66/km^{2} (211.5/sq mi)
- Time zone: UTC+01:00 (CET)
  - Summer (DST): UTC+02:00 (CEST)
- INSEE/Postal code: 72169 /72210
- ^{1} French Land Register data, which excludes lakes, ponds, glaciers > 1 km^{2} (0.386 sq mi or 247 acres) and river estuaries.

Louplande (French pronunciation: [luplɑ̃d]) is a commune in the Sarthe department in the region of Pays de la Loire in north-western France.

== See also ==
- Communes of the Sarthe department
