= Mézeray, Sarthe =

Mézeray
- Commune
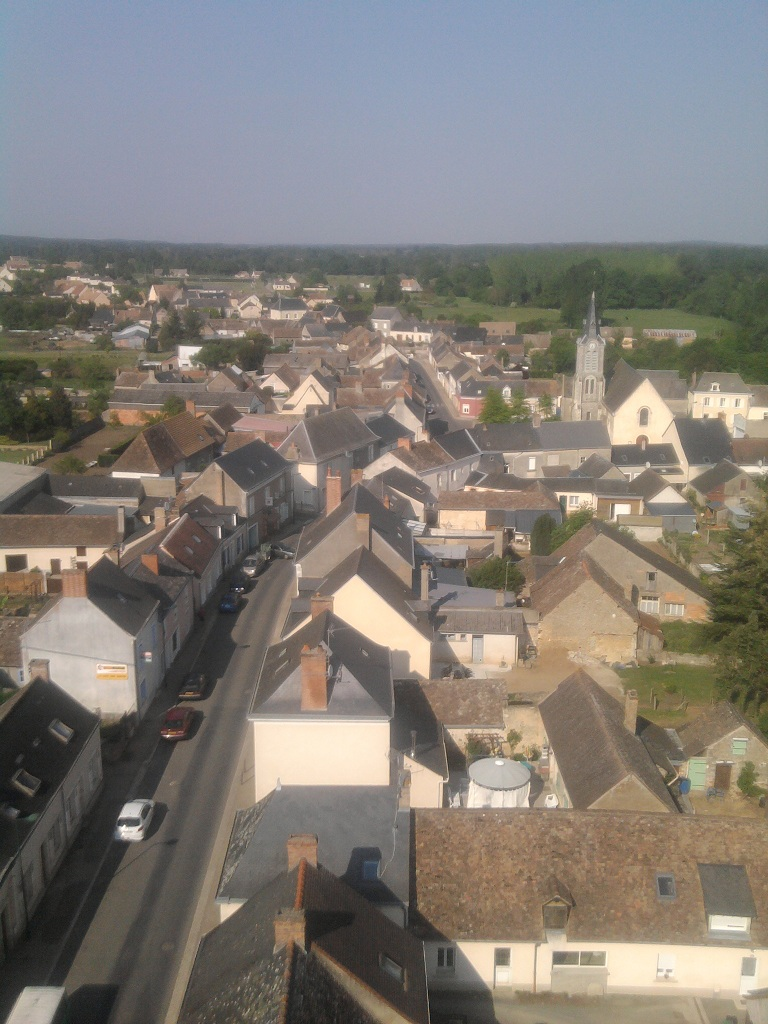
- A view over Mézeray
- Location of Mézeray
- Location within France Location within Pays de la Loire
- Coordinates: 47°49′30″N 0°01′11″W
- Country: France
- Region: Pays de la Loire
- Department: Sarthe
- Arrondissement: La Flèche
- Canton: La Suze-sur-Sarthe
- Intercommunality: CC du Val de Sarthe

Government
  - Mayor (2020–2026): Hervé Fontaineau
- Area^{1}: 32.95 km^{2} (12.72 sq mi)
- Highest elevation: 93 m (305 ft)
- Lowest elevation: 31 m (102 ft)
- Population (2023): 1,841
  - Density: 55.87/km^{2} (144.7/sq mi)
- Demonym(s): Mézeréen, Mézeréenne
- Time zone: UTC+01:00 (CET)
  - Summer (DST): UTC+02:00 (CEST)
- INSEE/Postal code: 72195 /72270
- ^{1} French Land Register data, which excludes lakes, ponds, glaciers > 1 km^{2} (0.386 sq mi or 247 acres) and river estuaries.

Mézeray is a commune in the Sarthe department in the region of Pays de la Loire in north-western France.

== See also ==
- Communes of the Sarthe department
