= Chemiré-le-Gaudin =

- Commune
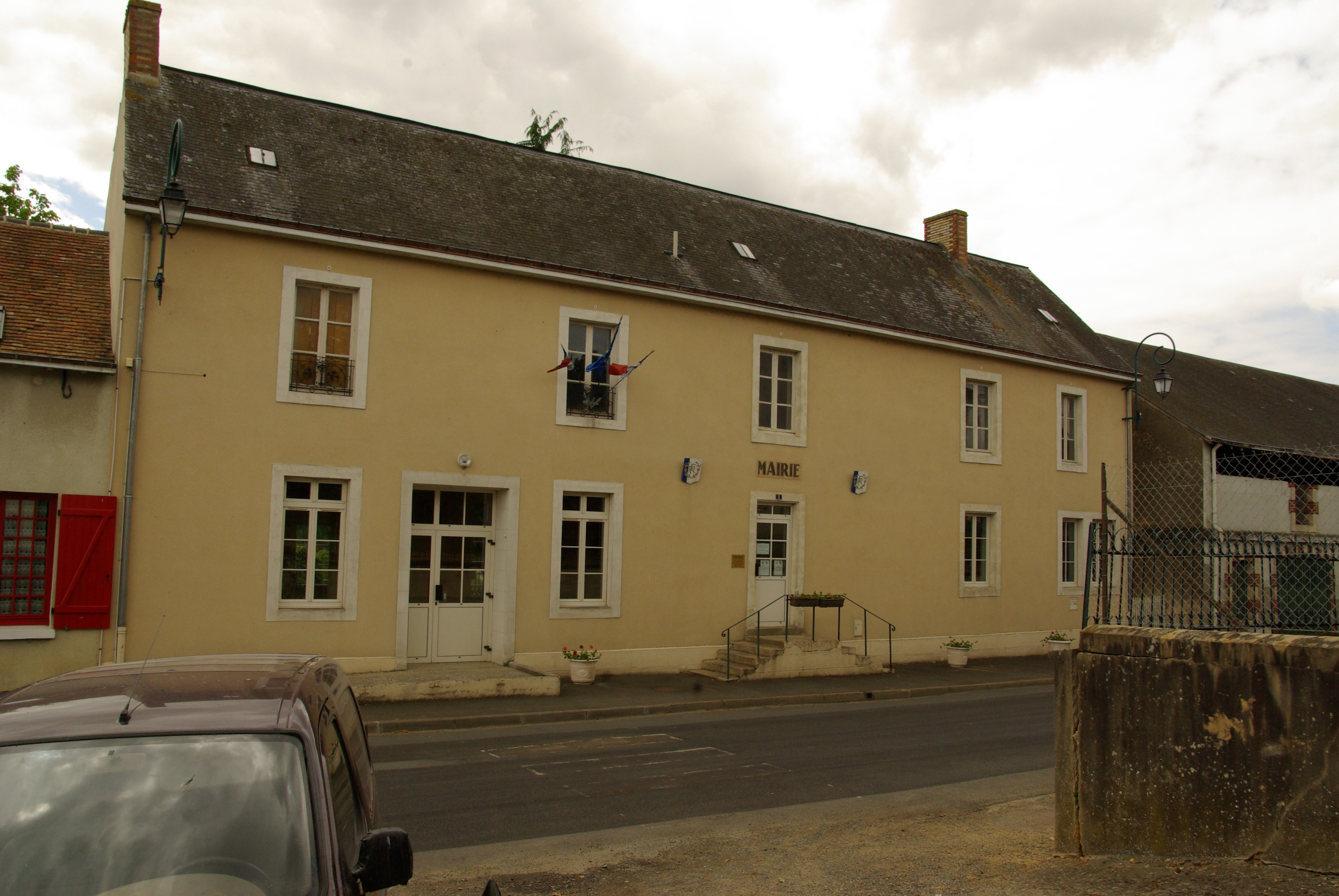
- Town hall
- Location of Chemiré-le-Gaudin
- Location within France Location within Pays de la Loire
- Coordinates: 47°55′45″N 0°00′50″W
- Country: France
- Region: Pays de la Loire
- Department: Sarthe
- Arrondissement: La Flèche
- Canton: La Suze-sur-Sarthe
- Intercommunality: Val de Sarthe

Government
  - Mayor (2020–2026): Michel Pavard
- Area^{1}: 22.79 km^{2} (8.80 sq mi)
- Highest elevation: 108 m (354 ft)
- Lowest elevation: 32 m (105 ft)
- Population (2023): 998
  - Density: 43.8/km^{2} (113/sq mi)
- Demonym(s): Chemiréen, Chemiréenne
- Time zone: UTC+01:00 (CET)
  - Summer (DST): UTC+02:00 (CEST)
- INSEE/Postal code: 72075 /72210
- ^{1} French Land Register data, which excludes lakes, ponds, glaciers > 1 km^{2} (0.386 sq mi or 247 acres) and river estuaries.

Chemiré-le-Gaudin (French pronunciation: [ʃəmiʁe lə ɡodɛ̃]) is a commune in the Sarthe department in the Pays de la Loire region in north-western France.

== See also ==
- Communes of the Sarthe department
