= Chemiré-sur-Sarthe =

- Part of Morannes sur Sarthe-Daumeray
- Location of Chemiré-sur-Sarthe
- Location within France Location within Pays de la Loire
- Coordinates: 47°45′07″N 0°25′52″W
- Country: France
- Region: Pays de la Loire
- Department: Maine-et-Loire
- Arrondissement: Angers
- Canton: Tiercé
- Commune: Morannes sur Sarthe-Daumeray
- Area^{1}: 6.62 km^{2} (2.56 sq mi)
- Elevation: 24 m (79 ft)
- Highest elevation: 69 m (226 ft)
- Lowest elevation: 18 m (59 ft)
- Population (2022): 266
  - Density: 40.2/km^{2} (104/sq mi)
- Time zone: UTC+01:00 (CET)
  - Summer (DST): UTC+02:00 (CEST)
- Postal code: 49640
- ^{1} French Land Register data, which excludes lakes, ponds, glaciers > 1 km^{2} (0.386 sq mi or 247 acres) and river estuaries.

Chemiré-sur-Sarthe (French pronunciation: [ʃəmiʁe syʁ saʁt], literally Chemiré on Sarthe) is a former commune in the Maine-et-Loire department of western France. On 1 January 2016, it was merged into the new commune of Morannes-sur-Sarthe, which became part of the commune Morannes sur Sarthe-Daumeray in January 2017.

== See also ==
- Communes of the Maine-et-Loire department
