= Fillé =

- Commune
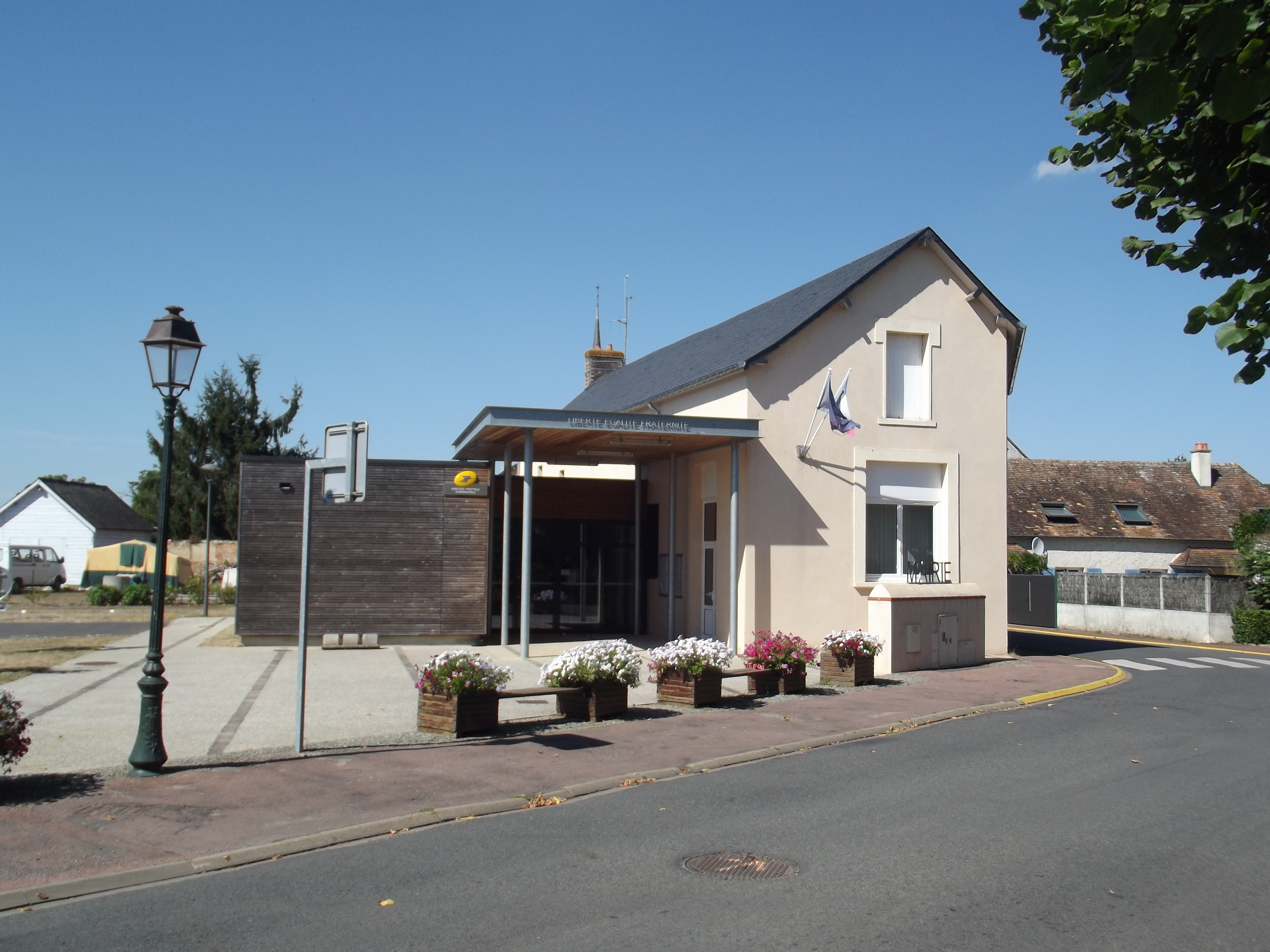
- The town hall of Fillé
- Location of Fillé
- Location within France Location within Pays de la Loire
- Coordinates: 47°54′00″N 0°08′00″E
- Country: France
- Region: Pays de la Loire
- Department: Sarthe
- Arrondissement: La Flèche
- Canton: La Suze-sur-Sarthe
- Intercommunality: Val de Sarthe

Government
  - Mayor (2020–2026): Luc Marie Faburel
- Area^{1}: 10.07 km^{2} (3.89 sq mi)
- Highest elevation: 73 m (240 ft)
- Lowest elevation: 35 m (115 ft)
- Population (2023): 1,562
  - Density: 155.1/km^{2} (401.7/sq mi)
- Demonym(s): Filléen, Filléenne
- Time zone: UTC+01:00 (CET)
  - Summer (DST): UTC+02:00 (CEST)
- INSEE/Postal code: 72133 /72210
- ^{1} French Land Register data, which excludes lakes, ponds, glaciers > 1 km^{2} (0.386 sq mi or 247 acres) and river estuaries.

Fillé is a commune in the Sarthe department in the Pays de la Loire region in north-western France.

== See also ==
- Communes of the Sarthe department
