= Morannes =

Commune in Maine-et-Loire, France

- Part of Morannes sur Sarthe-Daumeray
- Location of Morannes
- Location within France Location within Pays de la Loire
- Coordinates: 47°44′47″N 0°24′56″W
- Country: France
- Region: Pays de la Loire
- Department: Maine-et-Loire
- Arrondissement: Angers
- Canton: Tiercé
- Commune: Morannes sur Sarthe-Daumeray
- Area^{1}: 40.73 km^{2} (15.73 sq mi)
- Elevation: 26 m (85 ft)
- Highest elevation: 66 m (217 ft)
- Lowest elevation: 17 m (56 ft)
- Population (2013): 1,800
  - Density: 44/km^{2} (110/sq mi)
- Demonym(s): Morannais, Morannaise
- Time zone: UTC+01:00 (CET)
  - Summer (DST): UTC+02:00 (CEST)
- Postal code: 49640
- ^{1} French Land Register data, which excludes lakes, ponds, glaciers > 1 km^{2} (0.386 sq mi or 247 acres) and river estuaries.

Morannes (French pronunciation: [mɔʁan]) is a former commune in the Maine-et-Loire department in western France. On 1 January 2016, it was merged into the new commune of Morannes-sur-Sarthe, which became part of Morannes sur Sarthe-Daumeray in January 2017.

== See also ==
- Communes of the Maine-et-Loire department
