= File =

File, Files, or filing may refer to:

== Mechanical tools and processes ==
- File (tool), used for removing fine amounts of material from a workpiece
  - Filing (metalworking), a material removal process in manufacturing
  - Nail file, a tool used to gently abrade away and shape the edges of fingernails and toenails

== Documents ==
- An arranged collection of documents
- Filing (legal), submitting a document to the clerk of a court
- Epstein files, sometimes informally referred to as "the files"

== Computing ==
- Computer file, a resource for storing information
- file:///, officially the "File URI scheme", a specific format of uniform resource identifier used to specifically identify a resource on the local computer
- file (command), a Unix command-line app for detecting data types
- Files (Google), a file management app by Google Inc. for devices running Android OS
- Files (Apple), a file management app by Apple Inc. for devices running iOS and iPadOS

== Art and entertainment ==
- Filé (band), a Cajun musical ensemble from Louisiana, U.S.
- Files, a series of Indian thriller films by Vivek Agnihotri
  - The Tashkent Files, 2019 film about the 1966 death of Lal Bahadur Shastri in Tashkent
  - The Kashmir Files, 2022 film about the 1990s exodus of Kashmiri Hindus
  - The Delhi Files, an upcoming film about the 1984 anti-Sikh riots in Delhi
- The Files: The Greatest Hits (album), a 2004 compilation album by Vico C.
- Filè, a class of Irish poet

== People and organizations ==
- Jake Files (born 1972), a member of the Arkansas State Senate
- James Files (born 1942), American murderer
- Festival Internacional da Linguagem Eletrônica (Electronic Language International Festival), an art and technology festival held yearly in São Paulo, Brazil

== Other uses ==
- File (formation), a single column of troops one in front of the other
- File (chess), a column of the chessboard
- Filé powder, a culinary ingredient used in Cajun and Creole cooking

== See also ==
- File folder, a folder for holding loose papers
- Filing cabinet or file cabinet
