= Sarthe (river) =

River in France

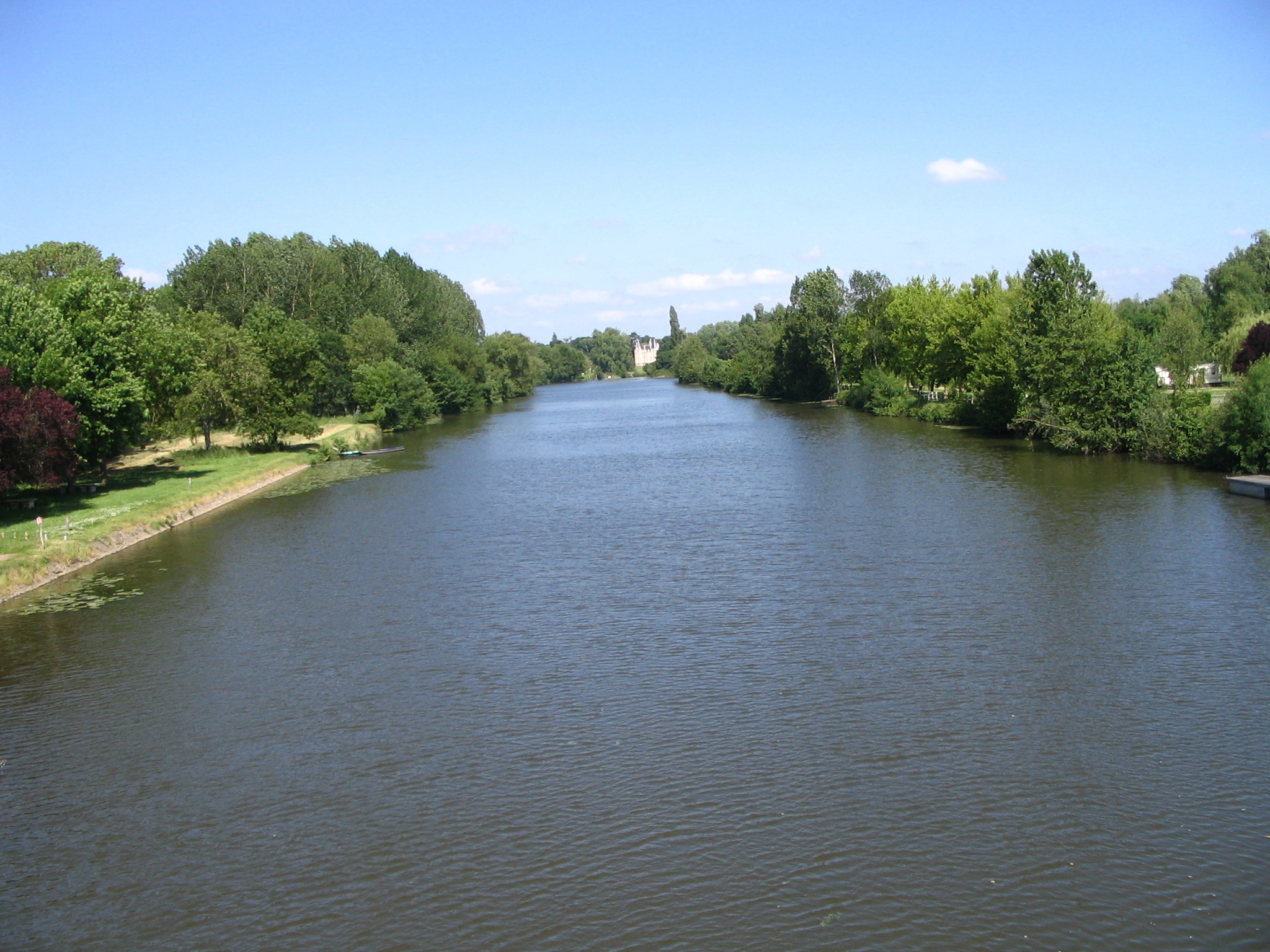
- The navigable river Sarthe between Morannes and Chemiré-sur-Sarthe

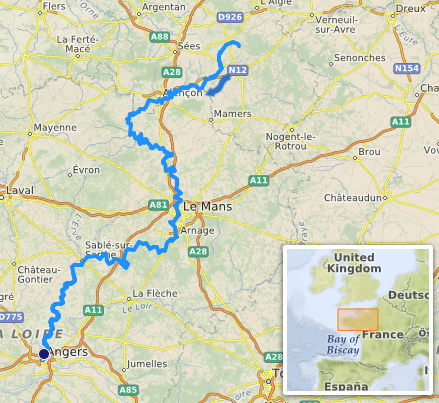
- Native name: La Sarthe (French)

Location
- Country: France

Physical characteristics
- Source
  - location: Perche
  - elevation: 250 m (820 ft)
- Mouth
  - location: Maine
  - coordinates: 47°29′35″N 0°32′34″W
- Length: 313.9 km (195.0 mi)
- Basin size: 7,864 km^{2} (3,036 sq mi)^{*}
- Discharge
  - average: 80 m^{3}/s (2,800 cu ft/s)^{*}

Basin features
- Progression: Maine→ Loire→ Atlantic Ocean
- Notes: ^{*}excluding Loir

The Sarthe (French pronunciation: [saʁt]) is a 313.9-kilometre-long (195.0 mi) river in western France. Together with the river Mayenne it forms the river Maine, which is a tributary to the river Loire.

Its source is in the Orne department, near Moulins-la-Marche. It flows generally southwest, through the following departments and towns:

- Orne: Le Mêle-sur-Sarthe, Alençon
- Sarthe: Fresnay-sur-Sarthe, Beaumont-sur-Sarthe, Le Mans, Sablé-sur-Sarthe
- Maine-et-Loire: Châteauneuf-sur-Sarthe, Tiercé, Angers

Its main tributaries are the Loir and the Huisne from the left, and the Vaige, the Erve and the Vègre from the right.

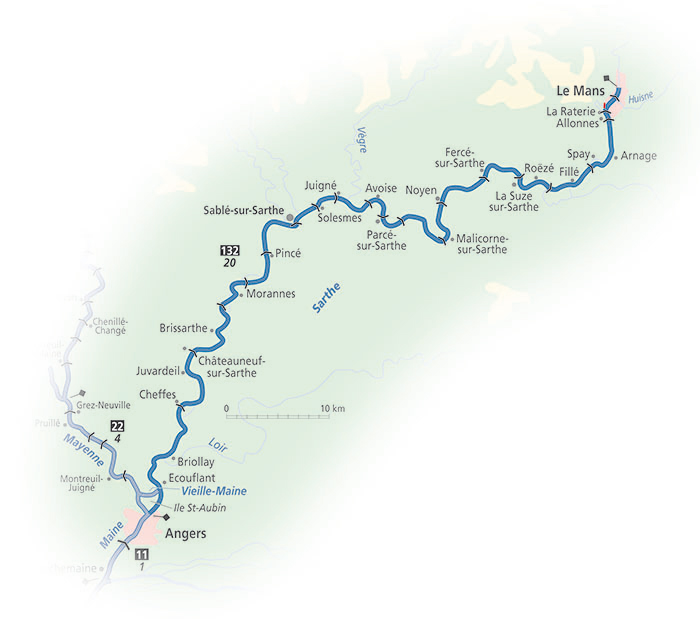
The navigable river Sarthe from Le Mans to the confluence with the Mayenne north of Angers

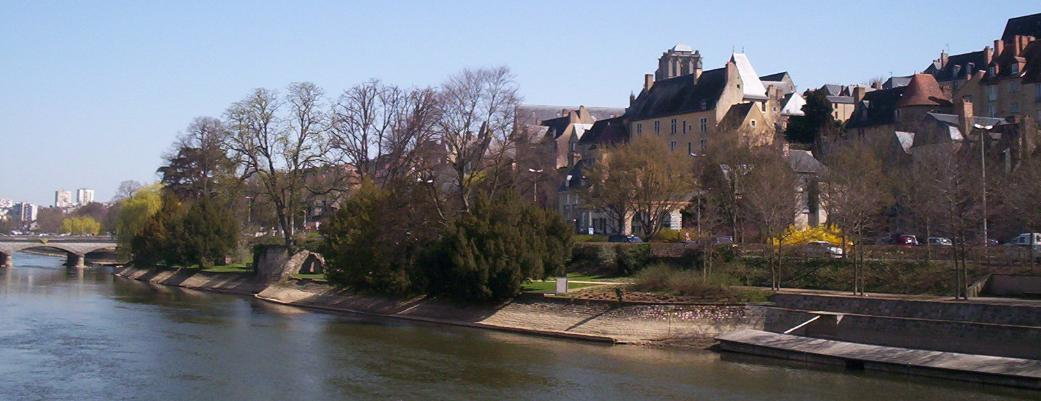
The Sarthe at Le Mans

== Navigation ==
The Sarthe has 20 weirs and locks. The channel is well marked and navigation is straightforward, except for the risk of shoals in certain sections.
